= Walter Verlag =

Swiss publishing house

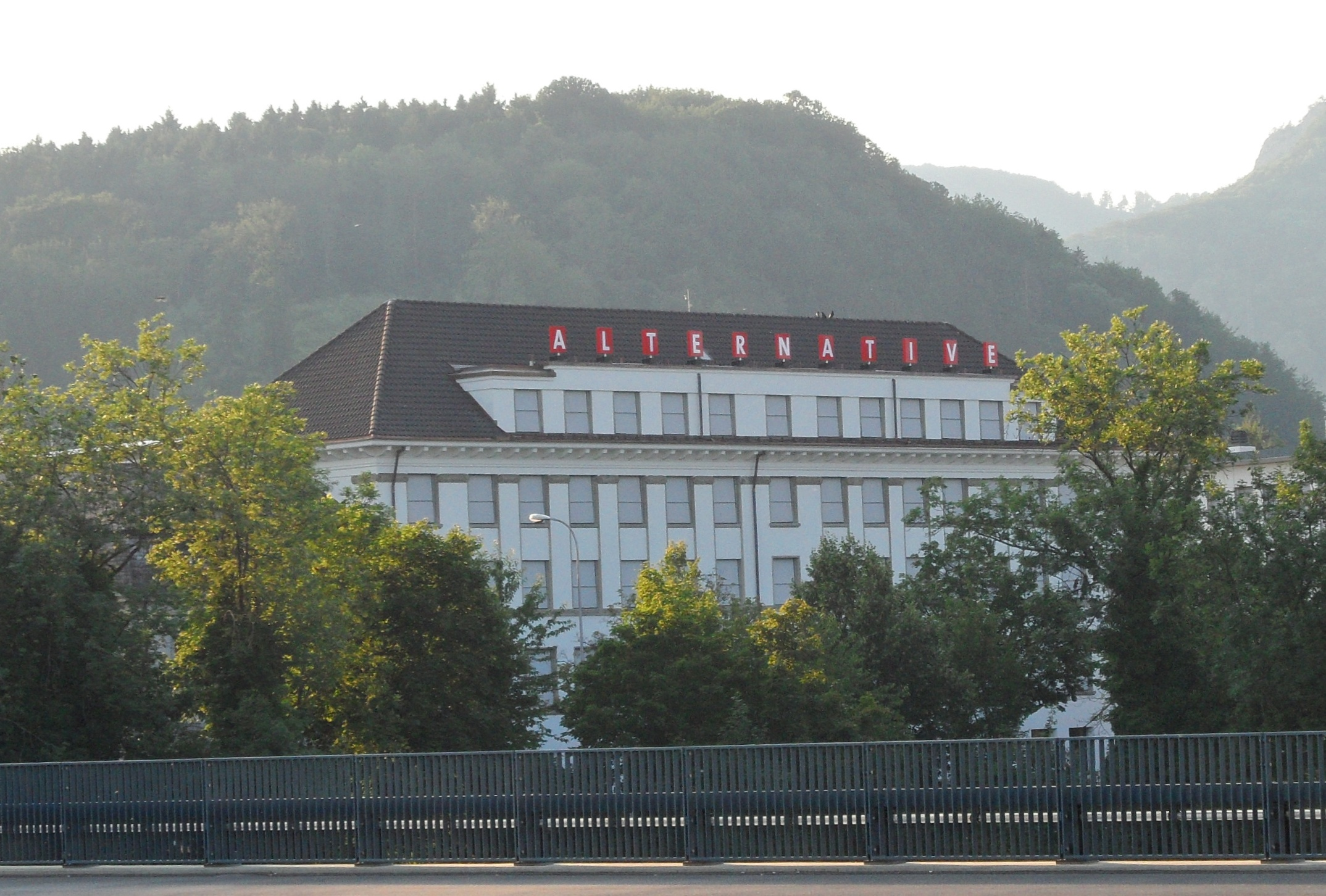
- Alternative Bank Schweiz in Olten, the former building of Walter Verlag
- Founded: 1916
- Founder: Otto Walter
- Successor: Otto F. Walter
- Country of origin: Switzerland
- Headquarters location: Olten, Solothurn, Zürich
- Key people: Otto Walter, Otto F. Walter
- Nonfiction topics: psychology, tourism

Walter Verlag was a publishing house founded in 1916 in Olten, Switzerland. In 1994, it was taken over by the Patmos publishing house, and later used again under the label of the Patmos group.

== History ==
Otto Walter (1899–1944) bought the printing house of the conservative Oltner Nachrichten newspaper in 1915. In 1916, he founded Walter Verlag in Olten as an intellectual bulwark of Catholicism. Walter grew the small business into one of Switzerland's most prestigious printing companies and publishers.

Otto Walter's son, the author Otto F. Walter (1928–1994) was born to a family of 9 children, including Silja Walter (1919–2011) and seven other daughters. The son was seen as his father's successor. Otto F. started a three-year teaching post as a bookseller in Zürich. His father died in 1944. The son first worked in his father's company, then volunteered at a printing company in Cologne and worked as an editor for publisher Jakob Hegner before returning to Walter Verlag. Walter learned the publishing operation starting as a warehousemen and billing clerk, before becoming vice director and joint owner. In 1956 Walter became the manager of the literary editorial. He rebuilt the lineup, which at the end of the 1950s became one of the most innovative publishing addresses. Authors such as Alfred Andersch, Peter Bichsel Helmut Heissenbüttel, Alexander Kluge, Kurt Marti, and Jörg Steiner were published, but not Otto F. Walter.

Walter's program found little support in the conservative company, nor in his Catholic family, despite a stable financial base. Following Ernst Jandl's novel laut und luise in 1966, Otto F. Walter was fired by Walter Verlag, because his increasingly avant-garde views collided with the shareholders of the conservative Catholic publisher. The publishing house suffered from Walter's absence, and in the 1990s it was acquired by the Patmos publishing group.

During the 1960s the complete edition of the works of Swiss psychologist Carl Gustav Jung were published. In the following decades the Psychology according to Jung became influential, inter alia with the works of Verena Kast and Eugen Drewermann, and even Wilhelm Reich's Christusmord was released. The literary programme continued, while travel guides became a pillar.

The publishing house fell into financial difficulties in the early 1990s, and in 1992 Patmos Verlagshaus in Düsseldorf bought it. The Swiss headquarters was moved first to Solothurn, then to Zürich. The publishing house's magazine Sonntag ("Sunday") was taken over in 1994 by CAT Media AG in Baden. The literary work was published in Düsseldorf. As part of Patmos, Walter Verlag largely focused on psychology and self-help. Non-fiction books were published since 2007 under the Patmos brand, which effectively ended the existence of Walter publishing. By the end of 2009, Patmos separated psychology and religion, and re-activated the Walter Verlag, though this lasted only for a year. No books have been published under the label Walter Verlag since 2010.

== See also ==
- Otto F. Walter
- Silja Walter

== Literature ==
- Jubiläumsschrift des Verlages Otto Walter AG Olten: 1921–1946. Walter Verlag, Olten 1946.
- Elsbeth Schild-Dürr: Otto F. Walter – Sperrzone und Wunschland: eine Werkbiographie. Benteli Verlag, Bern 1992. ISBN 3-7165-0795-4.
