= Otto F. Walter =

Swiss novelist and publisher (1928-1994)

- Walter in 1981
- Born: 5 June 1928; Rickenbach, Switzerland
- Died: 24 September 1994 (aged 66); Solothurn, Switzerland
- Occupations: Publisher, novelist, poet, author
- Writing career
- Years active: 1958–1993
- Genre: Adult literature
- Notable works: Der Stumme (1959); Die ersten Unruhen (1972); Wie wird Beton zu Gras (1979); Das Staunen der Schlafwandler am Ende der Nacht (1983); Eine Insel finden. Gespräch mit Otto F. Walter, 1983; Zeit des Fasans (1988); Die verlorene Geschichte (1993)

Otto F. Walter (5 June 1928 born as Otto Friedrich Walter – 24 September 1994) was a Swiss publisher (Walter Verlag), author and novelist, which is well known in the German language countries. Otto Friedrich Walter was the younger brother of Silja Walter, a Benedictine nun in the Fahr Abbey and also a popular writer.

== Early life ==
Otto Friedrich Walter was born on 5 June 1928 in Rickenbach, Solothurn, being the youngest child of Maria Anna Cäcilia Walter-Glutz, and the younger brother of Silja Walter (1919–2011) and further seven sisters. He spent his childhood in the rural Rickenbach near Solothurn. Otto Walter, his father, owned a printing company, and had made a small family company to one of the most prestigious printing companies and publishers of Switzerland, the Roman Catholic-oriented Walter Verlag in Olten. The only son was seen as the successor of his father, and therefore he was sent from 1940 to 1942 to the monastery school at the Engelberg Abbey, that he called a restricted area exclusively for men, but he abandoned. Otto Friedrich finished his scholar education at the Kollegium Maria Hilf in Schwyz from 1945 to 1947, thenafter he started a three-year education as a bookseller in Zürich, and graduated from the beginnings of the career that was expected of me. In 1952, he married, three sons were born at the intervals of three years, but he divorced in 1964.

== Walter-Verlag ==
Otto F. Walter's father died in 1944, and after first working in the father's company, he became a volunteer at a printing company in Köln: he worked for the publisher Jakob Hegner as editor, before returning to the Walter Verlag. He now learned the publishing operation and the work of a publisher from scratch, as warehousemen and billing clerk, and his way led up to the position of the vice director and joint owner. In 1956 Otto F. Walter was the manager of the literary editorial in the Walter publishing house, and rebuilt engaged and successfully, a demanding program line, which at the end of the 1950s became one of the best, most innovative publishing addresses in Switzerland. Authors such as Alfred Andersch, Peter Bichsel, Helmut Heissenbüttel, Alexander Kluge, Kurt Marti, and Jörg Steiner were published, but not Otto F. Walter himself.

After Walter had first published his works in München, submerged problems in his own publishing house increased. Walter's progressive program found little support by the conservative company itself, nor by his Catholic family, despite the balance sheet. On the occasion of the publication of Ernst Jandl's novel "laut und luise" in 1966, Otto F. Walter broke with the Walter Verlag, because his increasingly avant-garde alignment collided with the interests of the shareholders of the conservative Catholic publisher in 1967. The publications of the publishing house suffered from the leakage of Walter, and in the 1990s it was acquired by the Patmos publishing group.

== Achievements as writer ==
In 1959 Walter's first novel "Der Stumme" (literally: The Silent) found the attention of a wide readership, published in the Kösel Verlag München, as well as three years later the novel "Mr. Tourel", and again three years afterwards appeared the theater play "Elio oder Eine fröhliche Gesellschaft" (literally: Elio or a happy society). Especially the two novels convinced the criticism and achieved a very positive feedback.

In 1967, Walter was the head of the literary and sociological program in the Luchterhand Verlag Walter. In this function, he co-founded the Luchterhand collection. Ascended to the head of the publishing house, Walter left München in 1973, and returned again to Switzerland, first to Oberbipp and later to Solothurn, to turn increasingly to write.

Otto F. Walter wrote further novels, short stories, plays and poems. In his novels, the fictional Jura town "Jammers" (ironical for sorrow oder misery) was used to prevail the technique of a 'montaged novel'. The search for new, independent literatural forms shaped his socio-critical works "Die ersten Unruhen" (1972, literally: The first riots), "Die Verwilderung" (1977, literally: The savagery) and "Wie wird Beton zu Gras" (1979, literally: How is turning concrete to grass). Rowohlt published these novels respectively Eduard Reifferscheidt, the owner of the Luchterhand publishing house, granted a generous publisher contract, and facilitated Otto F. Walter transitioning as a free author. His novels distinguished themselves through their passionate presence in cover and their current theme, and appeared at regular intervals at the then Rowohlt publishing house. In 1982 Walter finally finished the work as publisher, and devoted himself to free writing. A selection of essays and speeches appeared in 1988 under the title "Gegenwort" (Keenly) at the Limmat Verlag Zürich. His novel "Das Staunen der Schlafwandler am Ende der Nacht" (1983, literally: The amazement of the sleepwalker at the end of the Night) triggered a silent hiss realism debate, and as Otto F. Walter's literally counterparty acted his friend Niklaus Meienberg. In 1980 Otto F. Walter started the work on the extensive family and era novel "Zeit des Fasans" (1988, literally: Time of the pheasant), in which Walter sat with his own origins and Switzerland's position during the Third Reich. In 1993, a further novel was published, "Die verlorene Geschichte", a passionate portrait of a xenophobe, the last testimony of Otto F. Walter's literary contemporariness.

== Political work ==
Walter served in literary field as a co-founder of the author association Gruppe Olten (1969), as well as he initiated the Solothurn literary festival. In the 1980s, Otto F Walter increasingly collaborated in political discussions. As an active member of the SP Switzerland, he became involved in the anti-nuclear movement, the peace movement and the so-called movement for an open, democratic and solidarity Switzerland (BODS) in 1986. Otto Friedich Walter had been an active member of the political party SP Schweiz, and was active in various other progressive political movements.

Otto F. Walter died after a long disease on pulmonary cancer in Solothurn on 24 September 1994.

== Awards (excerpt) ==
- 1959: Charles-Veillon-Preis
- 1972: Kulturpreis Kanton Solothurn
- 1977: Buchpreis Kanton Bern
- 1980: Preis der SWR-Bestenliste
- 1987: Schillerpreis

== Bibliography (highlights) ==
=== Novels ===
- 1959: Der Stumme. Kösel. München.
- 1962: Herr Tourel. Kösel. München.
- 1972: Die ersten Unruhen. Rowohlt, Reinbek.
- 1977: Die Verwilderung. Rowohlt, Reinbek.
- 1979: Wie wird Beton zu Gras. Rowohlt, Reinbek.
- 1983: Das Staunen der Schlafwandler am Ende der Nacht. Rowohlt, Reinbek.
- 1988: Zeit des Fasans. Rowohlt, Reinbek.
- 1993: Die verlorene Geschichte. Rowohlt, Reinbek.

=== Nonfiction ===
- 1983: Eine Insel finden. Gespräch zwischen Otto F. Walter und Silja Walter. Moderiert und mit Vorwort von Philippe Dätwyler. Arche, Zürich 1983, ISBN 3-716-050040.
- 1988: Auf der Suche nach der anderen Schweiz. Edition Kürz, Küsnacht 1991, ISBN 978-3906625256.
- 1988: Gegenwort. Aufsätze, Reden, Begegnungen. Limmat Verlag, Zürich 1988, ISBN 978-3312009893.

=== Plays ===
- 1965: Elio oder Eine fröhliche Gesellschaft, first played at Schauspielhaus Zürich in 1965.
- 1965: Die Katze, first played at Schauspielhaus Zürich in 1965.

=== Radio ===
- 1972: Die ersten Unruhen, SWR Stuttgart
- 2011: Der Stumme, SRF Zürich

== Literature ==
- Martin Zingg: Otto F. Walter und Paul Celan. Ein kleines Kapitel Verlagsgeschichte. Edition Isele, Eggingen 2007, ISBN 3-86142-385-5.
- Patrick Heller: „Ich bin der, der das schreibt“. Gestaltete Mittelbarkeit in fünf Romanen der deutschen Schweiz. Lang (= Europäische Hochschulschriften 1), Bern 2002, ISBN 3-906768-65-1.
- Elsbeth Schild-Dürr: Otto F. Walter – Sperrzone und Wunschland: eine Werkbiographie. Benteli Verlag, Bern 1992, ISBN 3-7165-0795-4.
- Gerda Zeltner: Das Ich ohne Gewähr. Gegenwartsautoren aus der Schweiz. Suhrkamp, Frankfurt am Main 1980, ISBN 978-3518047439.
- Andreas Kotte, ed. (2005). "Otto F. Walter". Theaterlexikon der Schweiz / Dictionnaire du théâtre en Suisse / Dizionario Teatrale Svizzero / Lexicon da teater svizzer [Theater Dictionary of Switzerland]. Vol. 3. Zürich: Chronos. pp. 2046–2047. ISBN 978-3-0340-0715-3. LCCN 2007423414. OCLC 62309181.
