= Lauperswil =

- Municipality
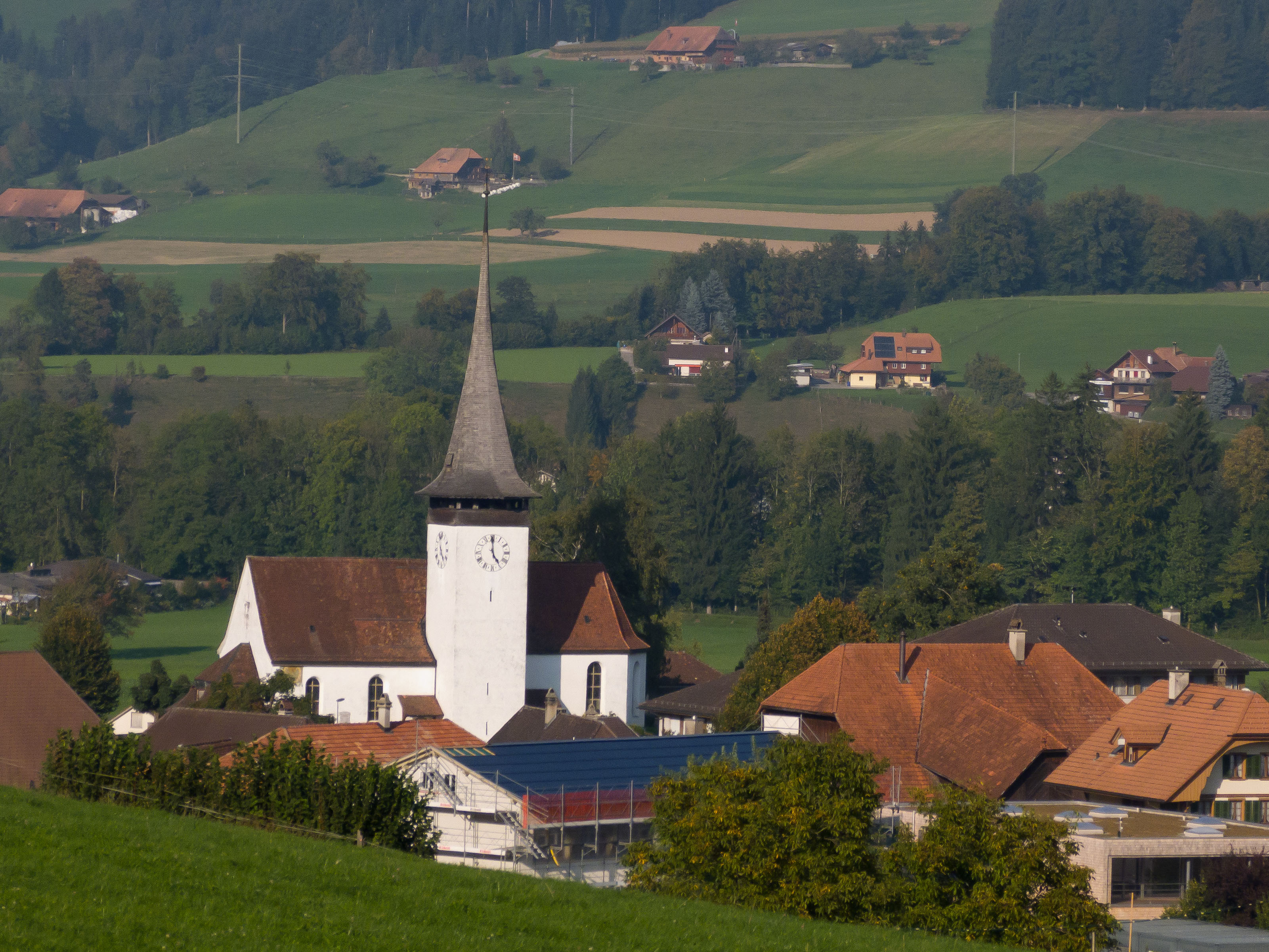
- Lauperswil village and church

- Flag Coat of arms
- Location of Lauperswil
- Location within Switzerland Location within Canton of Bern
- Coordinates: 46°58′N 7°45′E
- Country: Switzerland
- Canton: Bern
- District: Emmental

Government
  - Executive: Gemeinderat with 7 members
  - Mayor: Gemeindepräsident(in); Christian Baumann (as of 2026)

Area
  - Total: 21.19 km^{2} (8.18 sq mi)
- Elevation: 646 m (2,119 ft)

Population (December 2020)
  - Total: 2,663
  - Density: 125.7/km^{2} (325.5/sq mi)
- Time zone: UTC+01:00 (CET)
  - Summer (DST): UTC+02:00 (CEST)
- Postal code: 3438
- SFOS number: 903
- ISO 3166 code: CH-BE
- Surrounded by: Arni, Landiswil, Langnau im Emmental, Oberthal, Rüderswil, Signau, Trachselwald
- Website: www.lauperswil.ch

Lauperswil is a municipality in the administrative district of Emmental in the canton of Bern in Switzerland.

== History ==
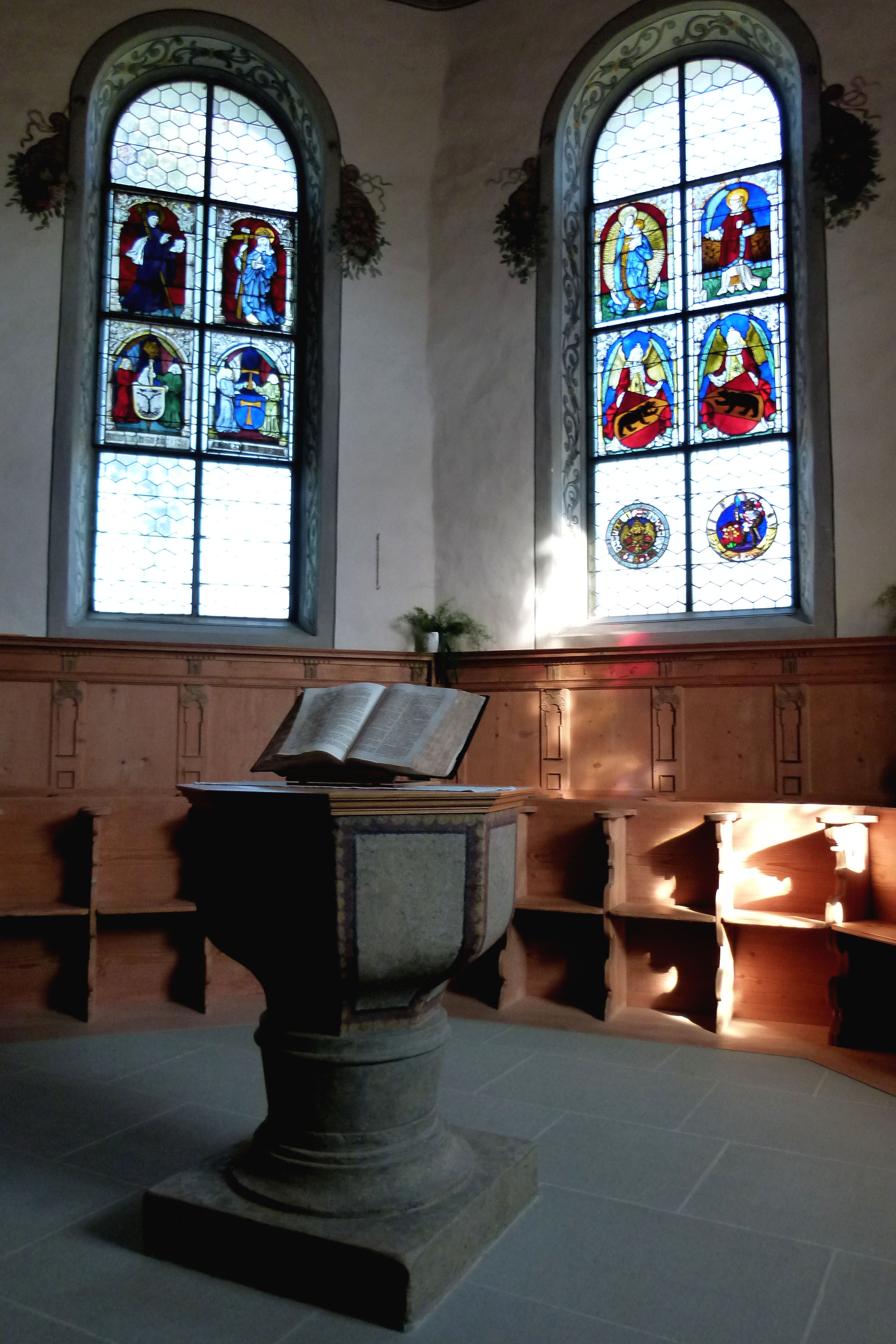
Baptismal font and stained glass windows in the village church

Lauperswil is first mentioned in 1275 as Loperswile.

Lauperswil and the surrounding area were inhabited during the Middle Ages and were part of the Herrschaft of Wartenstein. By the Late Middle Ages Trub Abbey was the largest landowner in the municipality. It was part of the high court of Ranflüh, which was acquired by Bern in 1408. It was part of the Trachselwald bailiwick until the reorganization following the 1803 Act of Mediation moved it into the Signau District. The first bridge over the Emme river in the municipality was built in 1552. The village of Zollbrück grew up around the bridge and toll station. The Bern-Langnau railroad built a station in Lauperswil in 1864, followed by the Burgdorf-Langnau railroad in 1881. The two railroads combined with a new road in 1899, brought factories and industry to the municipality. Many of these new factories settled in Zollbrück and Emmenmatt. Today, many of the factories are still in operation, though outside the industrial zones, agriculture still provides a number of jobs.

The village church was first mentioned in 1275. In 1284 it came under the authority of Trub Abbey and in 1294 joined the Abbey parish. In 1518 the church was rebuilt and in the following year the stained glass windows were added. In 1528, Bern adopted the new faith of the Protestant Reformation and secularized all of Trub Abbey's lands. The parish was dissolved and the village church came under the control of the Bern Minster.

== Geography ==
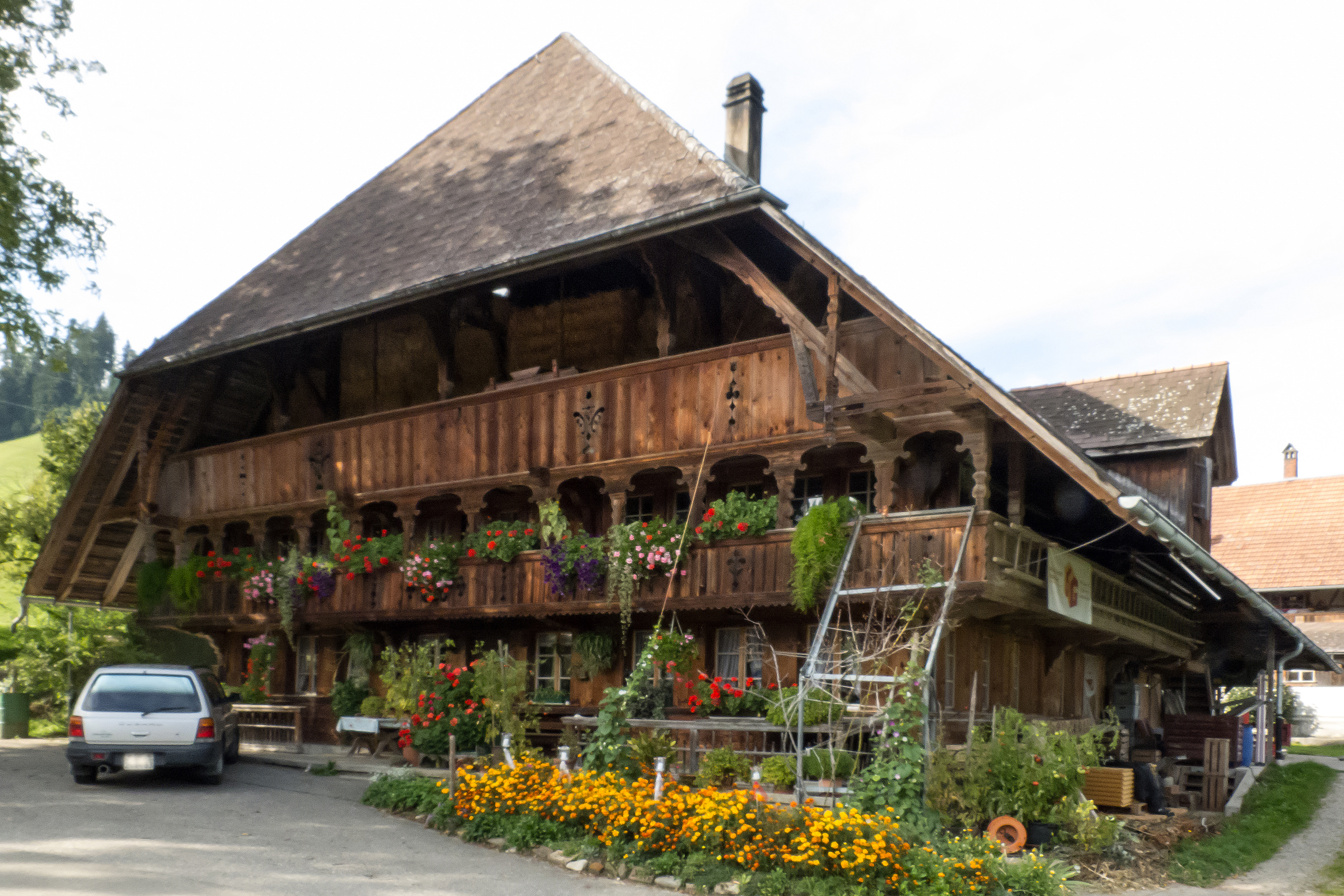
Farm house in Wittenbach

Aerial view by Walter Mittelholzer (1926)

Lauperswil has an area of 21.19 km^{2} (8.18 sq mi). As of 2012, a total of 11.9 km^{2} (4.6 mi^{2}) or 56.1% is used for agricultural purposes, while 7.48 km^{2} (2.89 mi^{2}) or 35.3% is forested. The rest of the municipality is 1.61 km^{2} (0.62 mi^{2}) or 7.6% is settled (buildings or roads), 0.12 km^{2} (30 acres) or 0.6% is either rivers or lakes and 0.03 km^{2} (7.4 acres) or 0.1% is unproductive land.

During the same year, housing and buildings made up 3.3% and transportation infrastructure made up 3.6%. A total of 32.7% of the total land area is heavily forested and 2.5% is covered with orchards or small clusters of trees. Of the agricultural land, 16.1% is used for growing crops and 38.1% is pasturage, while 1.9% is used for orchards or vine crops. All the water in the municipality is flowing water.

The municipality includes the village of Lauperswil on the left bank of the Emme River and part of the village and bridge of Zollbrück over the Emme (the northern part of the bridge belongs to Rüderswil). The small settlements of Emmenmatt, Bomatt, Mungnau and Obermatt, and the hamlets of Wittenbach, Längenbach and Ebnit as well as individual farm houses on both sides of the Emme also belong to the municipality. In 1889, Lauperswil acquired the section known as the Wittenbachviertel (Wittenbach quarter) from Rüderswil.

On 31 December 2009 Amtsbezirk Signau, the municipality's former district, was dissolved. On the following day, 1 January 2010, it joined the newly created Verwaltungskreis Emmental.

== Coat of arms ==
The blazon of the municipal coat of arms is Per pale Argent a Lion rampant to sinister Gules and of the second a Ploughshare of the first.

== Demographics ==
Lauperswil has a population (as of December 2020) of 2,663. As of 2012, 3.4% of the population are resident foreign nationals. Between the last 2 years (2010-2012) the population changed at a rate of -0.5%. Migration accounted for 0.6%, while births and deaths accounted for 0.4%.

Most of the population (as of 2000) speaks German (2,599 or 96.9%) as their first language, Albanian is the second most common (28 or 1.0%) and French is the third (8 or 0.3%). There are 6 people who speak Italian and 1 person who speaks Romansh.

As of 2008, the population was 50.3% male and 49.7% female. The population was made up of 1,295 Swiss men (48.2% of the population) and 55 (2.0%) non-Swiss men. There were 1,292 Swiss women (48.1%) and 43 (1.6%) non-Swiss women. Of the population in the municipality, 1,074 or about 40.1% were born in Lauperswil and lived there in 2000. There were 1,158 or 43.2% who were born in the same canton, while 234 or 8.7% were born somewhere else in Switzerland, and 124 or 4.6% were born outside of Switzerland.

As of 2012, children and teenagers (0–19 years old) make up 22.1% of the population, while adults (20–64 years old) make up 59.8% and seniors (over 64 years old) make up 18.1%.

As of 2000, there were 1,154 people who were single and never married in the municipality. There were 1,269 married individuals, 185 widows or widowers and 73 individuals who are divorced.

As of 2010, there were 308 households that consist of only one person and 97 households with five or more people. In 2000, a total of 976 apartments (87.9% of the total) were permanently occupied, while 92 apartments (8.3%) were seasonally occupied and 42 apartments (3.8%) were empty. As of 2012, the construction rate of new housing units was 1.5 new units per 1000 residents. The vacancy rate for the municipality, in 2013, was 0.4%. In 2011, single family homes made up 32.6% of the total housing in the municipality.

The historical population is given in the following chart:

== Heritage sites of national significance ==
The farm house at Chalchmatt 19/23 and the village church are listed as Swiss heritage site of national significance. The entire hamlets of Längenbach and Witenbach are part of the Inventory of Swiss Heritage Sites.

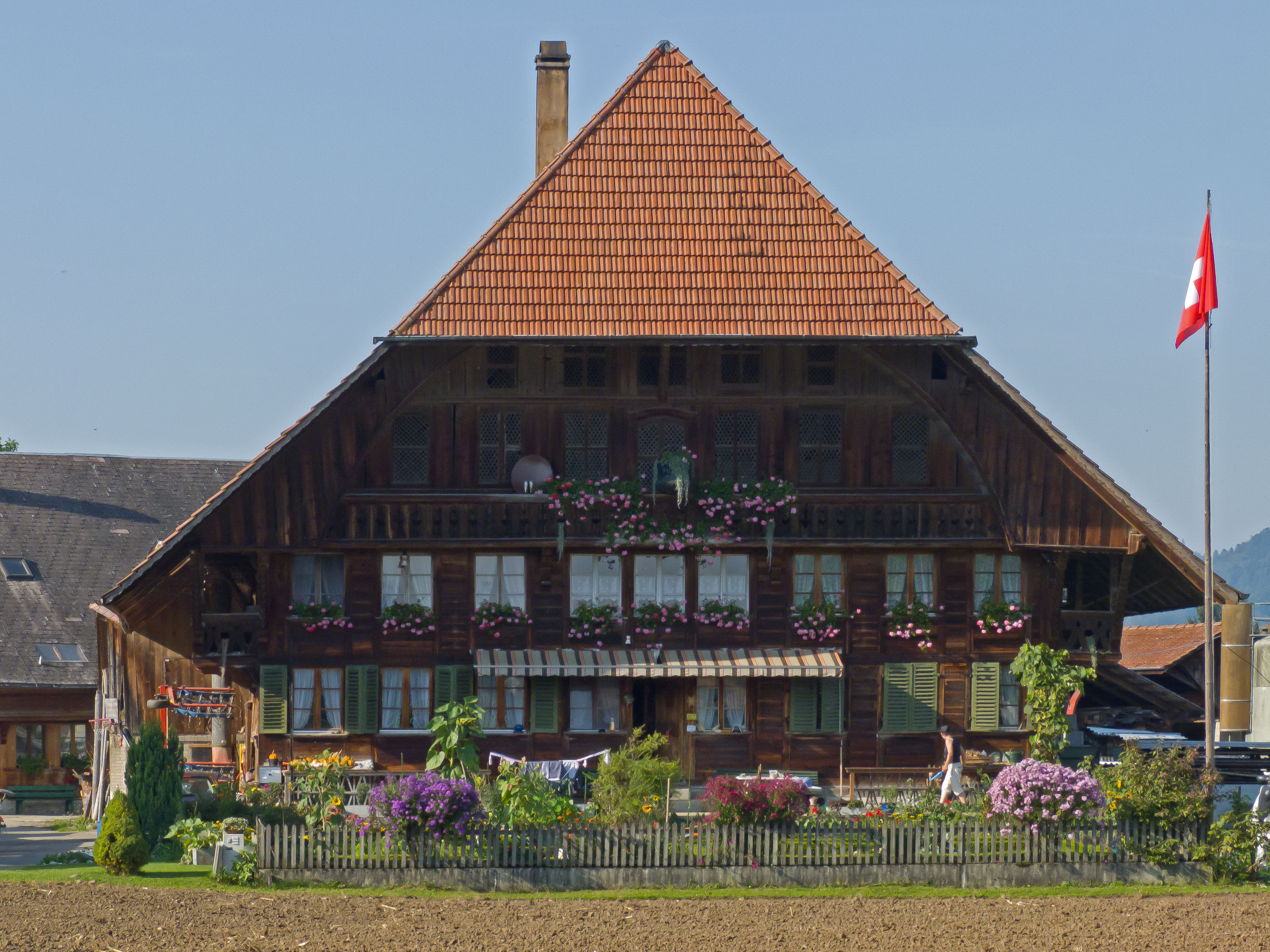
Farm house at Chalchmatt 19/23

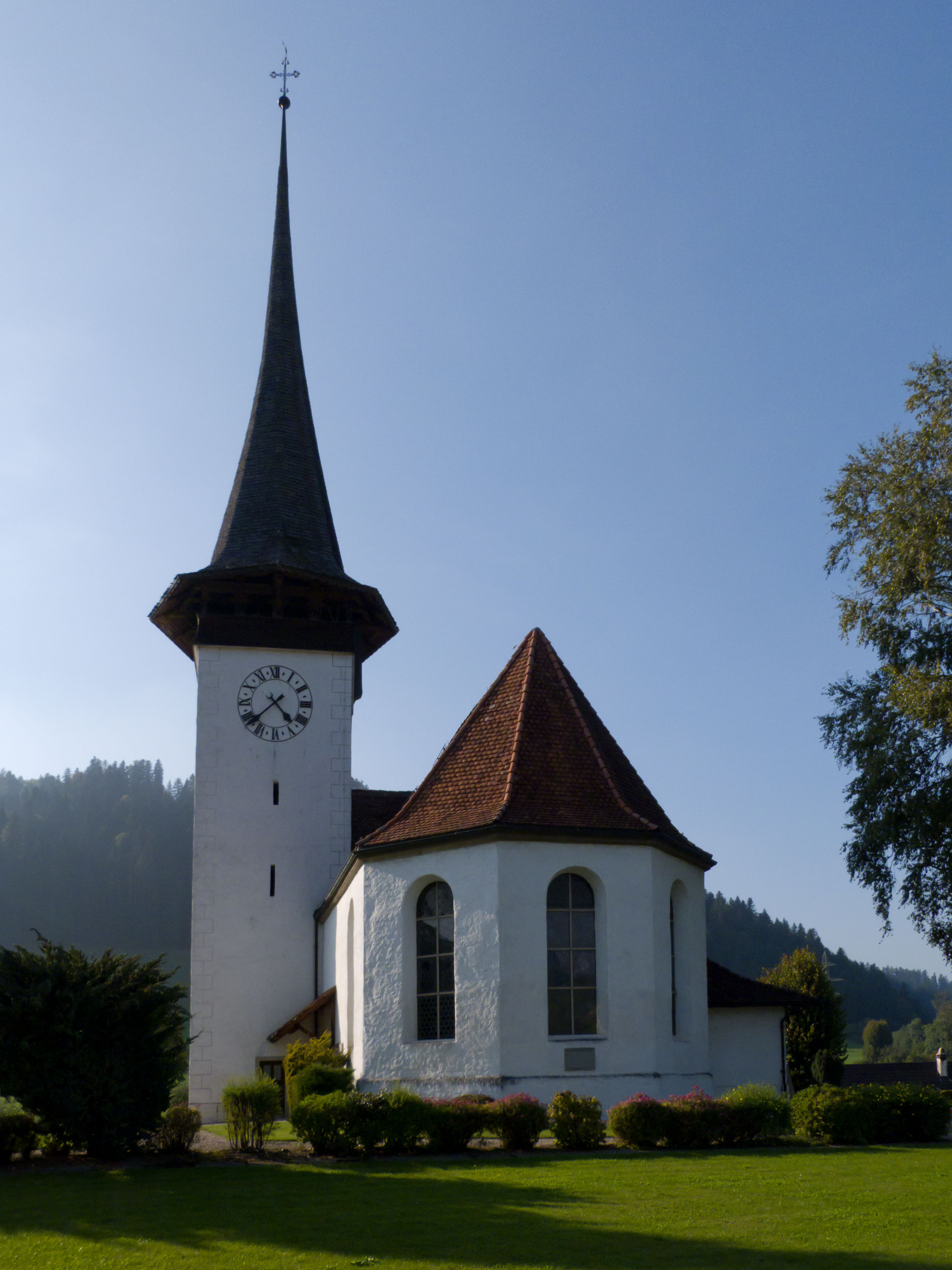
Village Church

== Politics ==
In the 2011 federal election the most popular party was the Swiss People's Party (SVP) which received 46.7% of the vote. The next three most popular parties were the Conservative Democratic Party (BDP) (17.6%), the Social Democratic Party (SP) (10.0%) and the Federal Democratic Union of Switzerland (EDU) (6.4%). In the federal election, a total of 942 votes were cast, and the voter turnout was 43.3%.

== Economy ==
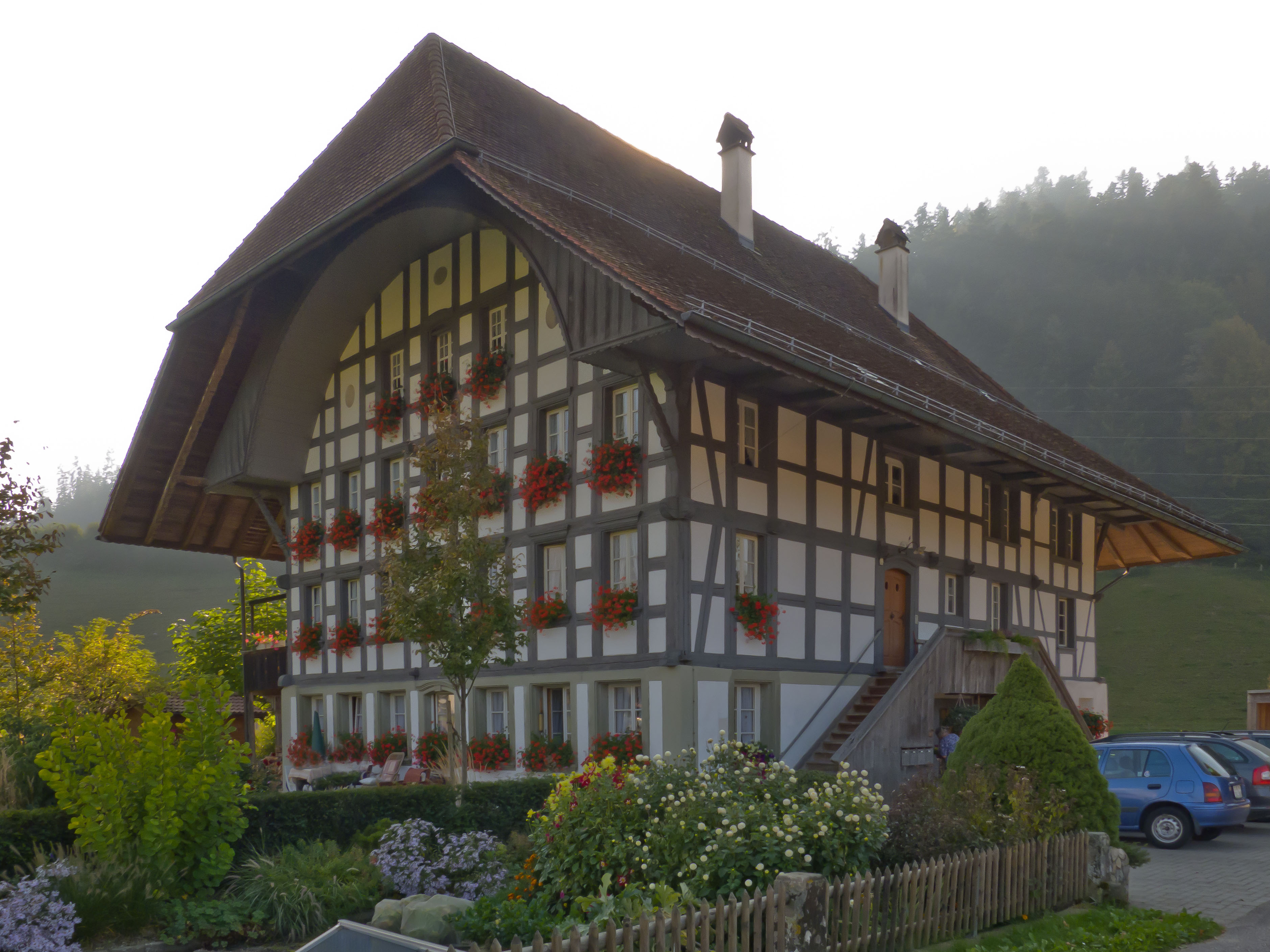
Wealthy landowners farmhouse in Lauperswil

As of 2011, Lauperswil had an unemployment rate of 1.79%. As of 2011, there were a total of 1,329 people employed in the municipality. Of these, there were 290 people employed in the primary economic sector and about 103 businesses involved in this sector. 500 people were employed in the secondary sector and there were 49 businesses in this sector. 539 people were employed in the tertiary sector, with 99 businesses in this sector. There were 1,437 residents of the municipality who were employed in some capacity, of which females made up 41.5% of the workforce.

In 2008 there were a total of 987 full-time equivalent jobs. The number of jobs in the primary sector was 189, all of which were in agriculture. The number of jobs in the secondary sector was 457 of which 231 or (50.5%) were in manufacturing and 220 (48.1%) were in construction. The number of jobs in the tertiary sector was 341. In the tertiary sector; 209 or 61.3% were in wholesale or retail sales or the repair of motor vehicles, 15 or 4.4% were in the movement and storage of goods, 42 or 12.3% were in a hotel or restaurant, 7 or 2.1% were the insurance or financial industry, 10 or 2.9% were technical professionals or scientists, 35 or 10.3% were in education and 9 or 2.6% were in health care.

In 2000, there were 446 workers who commuted into the municipality and 890 workers who commuted away. The municipality is a net exporter of workers, with about 2.0 workers leaving the municipality for every one entering. A total of 547 workers (55.1% of the 993 total workers in the municipality) both lived and worked in Lauperswil. Of the working population, 12.4% used public transportation to get to work, and 51.2% used a private car.

In 2011 the average local and cantonal tax rate on a married resident, with two children, of Lauperswil making 150,000 CHF was 12.6%, while an unmarried resident's rate was 18.6%. For comparison, the average rate for the entire canton in the same year, was 14.2% and 22.0%, while the nationwide average was 12.3% and 21.1% respectively.

In 2009 there were a total of 1,114 tax payers in the municipality. Of that total, 237 made over 75,000 CHF per year. There were 19 people who made between 15,000 and 20,000 per year. The greatest number of workers, 336, made between 50,000 and 75,000 CHF per year. The average income of the over 75,000 CHF group in Lauperswil was 111,378 CHF, while the average across all of Switzerland was 130,478 CHF.

In 2011 a total of 2.4% of the population received direct financial assistance from the government.

== Religion ==
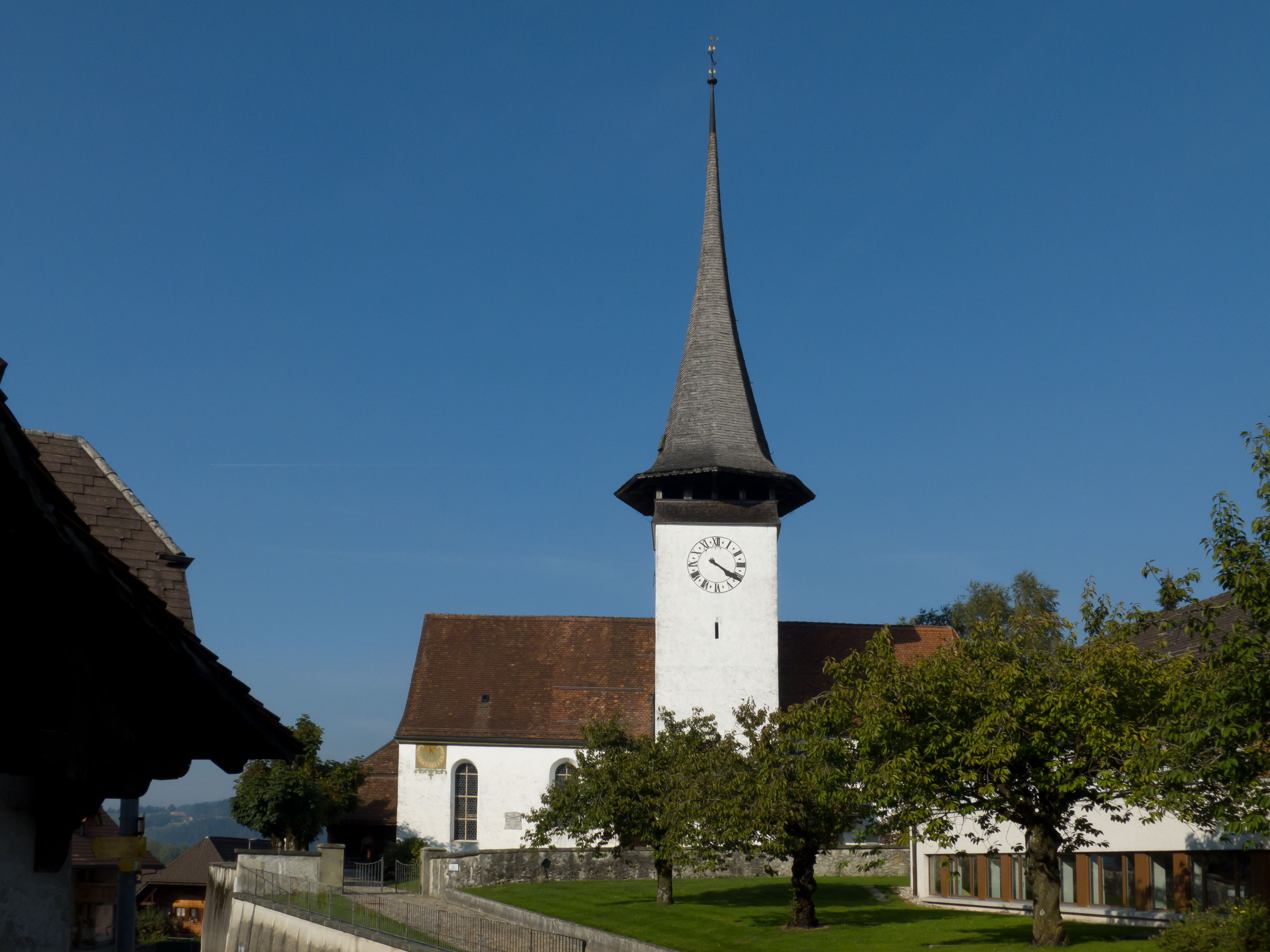
Lauperswil village church

From the 2000 census, 2,163 or 80.7% belonged to the Swiss Reformed Church, while 121 or 4.5% were Roman Catholic. Of the rest of the population, there were 9 members of an Orthodox church (or about 0.34% of the population), there was 1 individual who belongs to the Christian Catholic Church, and there were 123 individuals (or about 4.59% of the population) who belonged to another Christian church. There were 49 (or about 1.83% of the population) who were Muslim. There were 19 individuals who were Hindu and 1 individual who belonged to another church. 88 (or about 3.28% of the population) belonged to no church, are agnostic or atheist, and 107 individuals (or about 3.99% of the population) did not answer the question.

== Education ==
In Lauperswil about 53.2% of the population have completed non-mandatory upper secondary education, and 11.5% have completed additional higher education (either university or a Fachhochschule). Of the 177 who had completed some form of tertiary schooling listed in the census, 74.6% were Swiss men, 19.2% were Swiss women, 3.4% were non-Swiss men and 2.8% were non-Swiss women.

The Canton of Bern school system provides one year of non-obligatory Kindergarten, followed by six years of Primary school. This is followed by three years of obligatory lower Secondary school where the students are separated according to ability and aptitude. Following the lower Secondary students may attend additional schooling or they may enter an apprenticeship.

During the 2011-12 school year, there were a total of 371 students attending classes in Lauperswil. There were 2 kindergarten classes with a total of 47 students in the municipality. Of the kindergarten students, 2.1% were permanent or temporary residents of Switzerland (not citizens) and 8.5% have a different mother language than the classroom language. The municipality had 11 primary classes and 171 students. Of the primary students, 1.2% were permanent or temporary residents of Switzerland (not citizens) and 2.9% have a different mother language than the classroom language. During the same year, there were 9 lower secondary classes with a total of 153 students. There were 0.7% who were permanent or temporary residents of Switzerland (not citizens) and 2.6% have a different mother language than the classroom language.

As of 2000, there were a total of 368 students attending any school in the municipality. Of those, 284 both lived and attended school in the municipality, while 84 students came from another municipality. During the same year, 86 residents attended schools outside the municipality.

== Notable people ==
- Hans Mühlethaler (1930 in Mungnau bei Zollbrück – 2016) a Swiss writer, and a freelance writer and secretary of the Gruppe Olten
