= Hans Mühlethaler =

Swiss writer

- Born: 9 July 1930; Mungnau bei Zollbrück (Lauperswil), Switzerland
- Died: 17 September 2016 (aged 86)
- Citizenship: Swiss
- Occupation: Writer
- Known for: An der Grenze (1963), Die Fowlersche Lösung (1978), Abschied von Burgund (1991), Gruppe Olten

Hans Mühlethaler (9 July 1930 – 17 September 2016) was a Swiss writer.

== Career ==
Mühlethaler was a teacher in the Emmental and in the city of Bern, later a freelance writer and secretary of the Gruppe Olten. His play An der Grenze (theatre of the absurd) was premiered in 1963 at the Schauspielhaus Zurich under the direction of Karl Suter and published by Hans Rudolf Hilty in his literary magazine Hortulus. For his poems Zutreffendes ankreuzen he was awarded the Literature Prize of the Canton of Bern in 1968. He wrote novels and non-fiction and was a member of the Association of Authors of Switzerland.

== Personal life ==
He lived in Bern, was married and had five children. Mühlethaler died on 17 September 2016, aged 86.
