= Rickenbach, Solothurn =

Rickenbach
- Municipality
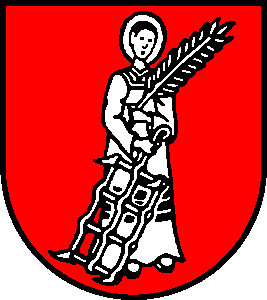
- Coat of arms
- Location of Rickenbach
- Location within Switzerland Location within Canton of Solothurn
- Coordinates: 47°21′N 7°52′E
- Country: Switzerland
- Canton: Solothurn
- District: Olten

Area
  - Total: 2.76 km^{2} (1.07 sq mi)
- Elevation: 429 m (1,407 ft)

Population (December 2020)
  - Total: 1,055
  - Density: 382/km^{2} (990/sq mi)
- Time zone: UTC+01:00 (CET)
  - Summer (DST): UTC+02:00 (CEST)
- Postal code: 4613
- SFOS number: 2582
- ISO 3166 code: CH-SO
- Surrounded by: Hägendorf, Hauenstein-Ifenthal, Kappel, Wangen bei Olten
- Website: rickenbachso.ch

Rickenbach (Swiss Standard German pronunciation: [ˈrɪkn̩bax]) is a municipality in the district of Olten in the canton of Solothurn in Switzerland.

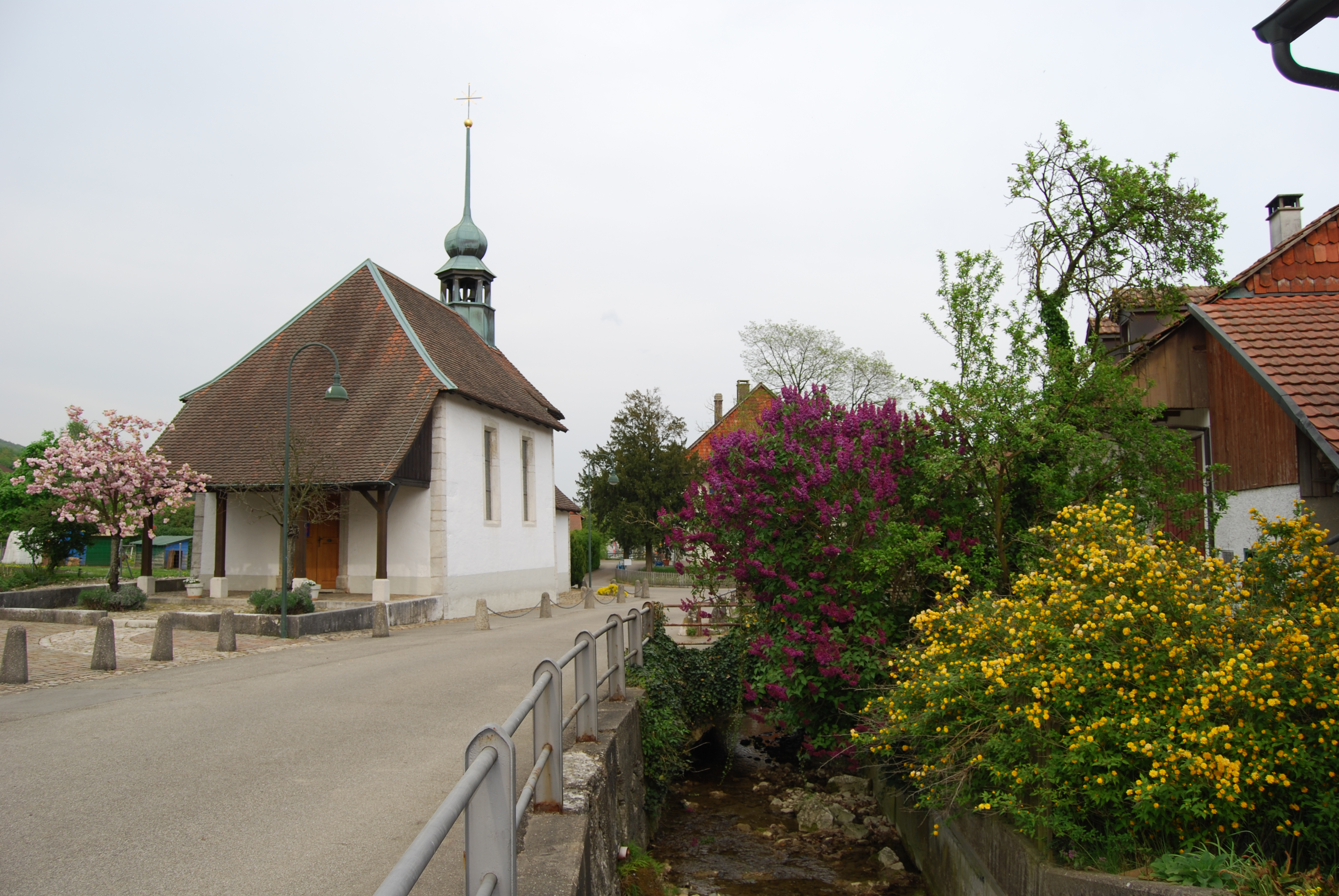
Rickenbach

== History ==
Rickenbach is first mentioned in 1288 as Richenbach.

== Geography ==
Aerial view (1970)

Rickenbach has an area, as of 2009, of 2.76 square kilometers (1.07 sq mi). Of this area, 0.86 km^{2} (0.33 sq mi) or 31.2% is used for agricultural purposes, while 1.46 km^{2} (0.56 sq mi) or 52.9% is forested. Of the rest of the land, 0.48 km^{2} (0.19 sq mi) or 17.4% is settled (buildings or roads).

Of the built up area, industrial buildings made up 4.0% of the total area while housing and buildings made up 8.3% and transportation infrastructure made up 4.3%. Out of the forested land, 50.7% of the total land area is heavily forested and 2.2% is covered with orchards or small clusters of trees. Of the agricultural land, 14.1% is used for growing crops and 17.0% is pastures.

The municipality is located in the Olten district, at the southern foot of the Jura Mountains on the alluvial fan of a stream that feeds into the Dünnern river.

== Coat of arms ==
The blazon of the municipal coat of arms is Gules St. Lawrence Argent statant holding in his dexter hand a Grill and in his sinister hand a Palm Branch.

== Demographics ==
Rickenbach has a population (as of December 2020) of 1,055. As of 2008, 9.2% of the population are resident foreign nationals. Over the last 10 years (1999–2009 ) the population has changed at a rate of 2.5%. Most of the population (as of 2000) speaks German (843 or 95.3%), with Serbo-Croatian being second most common (9 or 1.0%) and Italian being third (6 or 0.7%). There are 5 people who speak French and 2 people who speak Romansh.

As of 2008, the gender distribution of the population was 51.3% male and 48.7% female. The population was made up of 413 Swiss men (45.9% of the population) and 48 (5.3%) non-Swiss men. There were 399 Swiss women (44.4%) and 39 (4.3%) non-Swiss women. Of the population in the municipality 191 or about 21.6% were born in Rickenbach and lived there in 2000. There were 331 or 37.4% who were born in the same canton, while 254 or 28.7% were born somewhere else in Switzerland, and 83 or 9.4% were born outside of Switzerland.

In 2008 there were 3 live births to Swiss citizens and 2 births to non-Swiss citizens, and in same time span there were 8 deaths of Swiss citizens. Ignoring immigration and emigration, the population of Swiss citizens decreased by 5 while the foreign population increased by 2. There were 2 Swiss men and 1 Swiss woman who immigrated back to Switzerland. At the same time, there were 2 non-Swiss men and 1 non-Swiss woman who immigrated from another country to Switzerland. The total Swiss population change in 2008 (from all sources, including moves across municipal borders) was a decrease of 2 and the non-Swiss population decreased by 2 people. This represents a population growth rate of -0.4%.

The age distribution, as of 2000, in Rickenbach is; 64 children or 7.2% of the population are between 0 and 6 years old and 135 teenagers or 15.3% are between 7 and 19. Of the adult population, 39 people or 4.4% of the population are between 20 and 24 years old. 292 people or 33.0% are between 25 and 44, and 239 people or 27.0% are between 45 and 64. The senior population distribution is 92 people or 10.4% of the population are between 65 and 79 years old and there are 24 people or 2.7% who are over 80.

As of 2000, there were 338 people who were single and never married in the municipality. There were 459 married individuals, 47 widows or widowers and 41 individuals who are divorced.

As of 2000, there were 365 private households in the municipality, and an average of 2.4 persons per household. There were 91 households that consist of only one person and 22 households with five or more people. Out of a total of 368 households that answered this question, 24.7% were households made up of just one person and there were 2 adults who lived with their parents. Of the rest of the households, there are 137 married couples without children, 116 married couples with children There were 11 single parents with a child or children. There were 8 households that were made up of unrelated people and 3 households that were made up of some sort of institution or another collective housing.

In 2000 there were 169 single family homes (or 70.4% of the total) out of a total of 240 inhabited buildings. There were 30 multi-family buildings (12.5%), along with 29 multi-purpose buildings that were mostly used for housing (12.1%) and 12 other use buildings (commercial or industrial) that also had some housing (5.0%). Of the single family homes 16 were built before 1919, while 24 were built between 1990 and 2000. The greatest number of single family homes (37) were built between 1971 and 1980.

In 2000 there were 383 apartments in the municipality. The most common apartment size was 4 rooms of which there were 122. There were 8 single room apartments and 162 apartments with five or more rooms. Of these apartments, a total of 357 apartments (93.2% of the total) were permanently occupied, while 17 apartments (4.4%) were seasonally occupied and 9 apartments (2.3%) were empty. As of 2009, the construction rate of new housing units was 0 new units per 1000 residents. The vacancy rate for the municipality, in 2010, was 2.61%.

The historical population is given in the following chart:

== Politics ==
In the 2007 federal election the most popular party was the SVP which received 34.74% of the vote. The next three most popular parties were the FDP (21.56%), the CVP (21.52%) and the SP (12.63%). In the federal election, a total of 342 votes were cast, and the voter turnout was 49.4%.

== Economy ==
As of 2010, Rickenbach had an unemployment rate of 2.5%. As of 2008, there were 9 people employed in the primary economic sector and about 5 businesses involved in this sector. 362 people were employed in the secondary sector and there were 7 businesses in this sector. 407 people were employed in the tertiary sector, with 40 businesses in this sector.

There were 494 residents of the municipality who were employed in some capacity, of which females made up 41.5% of the workforce. In 2008 the total number of full-time equivalent jobs was 660. The number of jobs in the primary sector was 5, all of which were in agriculture. The number of jobs in the secondary sector was 352 of which 349 or (99.1%) were in manufacturing and 3 (0.9%) were in construction. The number of jobs in the tertiary sector was 303. In the tertiary sector; 48 or 15.8% were in wholesale or retail sales or the repair of motor vehicles, 164 or 54.1% were in the movement and storage of goods, 3 or 1.0% were in a hotel or restaurant, 19 or 6.3% were in the information industry, 5 or 1.7% were the insurance or financial industry, 17 or 5.6% were technical professionals or scientists, 5 or 1.7% were in education.

In 2000, there were 580 workers who commuted into the municipality and 408 workers who commuted away. The municipality is a net importer of workers, with about 1.4 workers entering the municipality for every one leaving. About 1.6% of the workforce coming into Rickenbach are coming from outside Switzerland. Of the working population, 11.7% used public transportation to get to work, and 61.9% used a private car.

== Religion ==
From the 2000 census, 394 or 44.5% were Roman Catholic, while 272 or 30.7% belonged to the Swiss Reformed Church. Of the rest of the population, there were 7 members of an Orthodox church (or about 0.79% of the population), there were 5 individuals (or about 0.56% of the population) who belonged to the Christian Catholic Church, and there were 29 individuals (or about 3.28% of the population) who belonged to another Christian church. There was 1 individual who was Jewish, and 23 (or about 2.60% of the population) who were Islamic. There were 2 individuals who were Hindu. 129 (or about 14.58% of the population) belonged to no church, are agnostic or atheist, and 23 individuals (or about 2.60% of the population) did not answer the question.

== Education ==
In Rickenbach about 380 or (42.9%) of the population have completed non-mandatory upper secondary education, and 120 or (13.6%) have completed additional higher education (either university or a Fachhochschule). Of the 120 who completed tertiary schooling, 66.7% were Swiss men, 25.0% were Swiss women, 5.8% were non-Swiss men.

As of 2000, there were 43 students from Rickenbach who attended schools outside the municipality.

== Personalities ==
- Silja Walter (1919–2011) Swiss author and Benedictine nun in the Fahr Abbey
- Otto F. Walter (1928–1994) Swiss journalist, author and publisher
