= Jürg Weibel =

Jürg Weibel (Bern, 19 August 1944 - Basel, 24 May 2006) was a Swiss writer, journalist and teacher.

He studied medicine, German, history and philology at the University of Basel. He was a member of Gruppe Olten and of P.E.N.

== Career ==
Jürg Weibel worked as a school teacher and writer, before breaking through as a celebrated writer. He earned fame with his historical novels and plays. Although lesser known as a playwright and poet, he did write them.

== Works ==
=== Novels ===
- Ellbogenfreiheit. Patriotische Gedichte. Lenos, Basel 1978
- Rattenbesuch. Phantastische Erzählungen. Nachtmaschine, Basel 1979
- Saat ohne Ernte. Legende und Wirklichkeit im Leben des General Johann August Sutter. Nachtmaschine, Basel 1980
- Die schönste Frau der Stadt. 10 Erzählungen. Orte, Zürich 1981
- Feinarbeit im Morgengrauen / Laubscher. Zwei Erzählungen. Ritter, Klagenfurt 1981
- Das Schweigen der Frauen von Masachapa. Erzählungen. Nachtmaschine, Basel 1983
- Geisterstadt. Erzählungen. Nachtmaschine, Basel 1985
- Die seltsamen Absenzen des Herrn von Z. Roman. Edition Erpf bei Neptun, Kreuzlingen 1988
- Tod in den Kastanien. Roman. Edition Erpf, Bern 1990
- Captain Wirz: Eine Chronik. Ein dokumentarischer Roman. Edition Erpf, Bern 1991
- Beethovens Fünfte. Roman. Xenon, Basel 1996
- Ein Kind von Madonna. Irre Geschichten. Cosmos, Muri bei Bern 1999
- Doppelmord am Wisenberg. Kriminalroman. Orte, Oberegg 2006

== Short stories ==
Rats Visit (1979) Work Fine at Dawn (1981) The Silence of the women of Masachapa (1983) Ghost Town (1985) A Child of Madonna (1999)

== Poems ==
Elbow (1978)

=== Theatre ===
- D’Muetter wott’s wüsse. UA: Stadttheater Bern 1985
- Tangostunde. UA: Zähringer-Theater Bern 1995

=== Radio and others ===
- Die Literatur Lateinamerikas im Aufbruch. Schweizer Radio DRS, 1978
- Was hat Jazz mit Literatur zu tun? DRS, 1986/87
- Die wunderbare Wirklichkeit Amerikas. Zum Werk Alejo Carpentiers. DRS, 1988
- Henry Wirz: Massenmörder oder Sündenbock? (Hörspiel). DRS, 1990
- November (Hörspiel). SWF, 1992
- Gold-Dreck (Hörspiel in 4 Folgen). SWF, 1994
- Schizophrenie und Poesie (Feature). SWR, 2000
