= Silja Walter =

Swiss novelist, poet and Benedictine nun (1919–2011)

- Walter on SRF 1, Sternstunde Religion, broadcast on 29 June 2003
- Born: 23 April 1919 Rickenbach, Solothurn, Switzerland
- Died: 31 January 2011 (aged 91) Fahr Abbey, Switzerland
- Occupation: Novelist, poet, nun
- Genre: Adult literature
- Notable awards: See awards
- Relatives: Otto F. Walter (brother)

Silja Walter (born Cécile Walter; 23 April 1919 – 31 January 2011) was a Swiss author and Benedictine nun in the Fahr Abbey. At age 30 she became a nun; her religious name was Maria Hedwig (OSB). Her brother, Otto F. Walter, was also an author.

== Biography ==
Cécile "Silja" Walter's father Otto was the founder of the Walter Verlag publishing house, writer and member of the Swiss National Council, her mother, Maria Anna Cäcilia Walter-Glutz, wrote lyrics for domestic use. Silja was the second oldest of eight daughters, her only brother was the writer Otto F. Walter (1928–1994). Silja Walter studied five years at a teachers' training college and began her studies of literature at the University of Fribourg. Due to a life-threatening lung disease, she had to break. In 1944 her first poetry collection "Die ersten Gedichte" was published; as relatively popular author, in 1948 she joined the Benedictine convent of Fahr Abbey.

== Work and reputation ==
Silja Walter's work of about 60 publications includes poetry and prose, as well as festivals, oratorios and theological texts reflecting her life as nun. Silja Walter has received many awards, among them literary and cultural prices from the city of Zürich, by the Swiss Schiller Foundation in 1956 and 1992, and the art prize of the canton of Solothurn. Her book «Eine Insel finden» ("To find an island", 1984) was a best selling work, based on a radio show that confronted Silja Walter with her brother Otto F. Walter. The Walter siblings had a completely different literary activity: Her brother was a dedicated social critics, Silja Walter wrote lyrics "far away from the world" in a monastery. «Der Wolkenbaum» ("The tree in the clouds", 1992) was even more successful, reflecting Silja Walter's family history. In 2009, her biography was published, «Das dreifarbene Meer» ("The three-colored sea"), written probably on her computer: at the age of 80 she started to use computers, in 2010, she was allowed by the Prioress of the Fahr Abbey to use an Internet access.

On 23 April 2016, the Silja-Walter-Raum at the Fahr Abbey was inaugurated. The monastery would appeal to people who knew the artist's work, but also for the younger generation, said Prioress Irene on occasion of an interview. Sister Maria Hedwig's literal work is inextricably linked to the Benedictine nunnery where she lived for over 60 years. During this time, Silja Walter wrote most of her literary work. After the renovation of the provost's room, its former office with its beautiful stucco ceiling was chosen to establish a small museum. It contains numerous texts, film, audio and photographic documents, as well as excerpts from the radio interview from 1982, when Silja Walter and her brother, Otto F. Walter, recorded the interview tape Eine Insel (An Island). But also personal objects like the nun's typewriter are exhibited, and also the lesser known drawings and painting of the artist. For now, the room will be open every last Sunday of the month after the worship service from approximately 10:45 to 14:00; admission is free. Silja Walter's complete work was published posthumously in by so far 11 volumes.

== Awards ==
- 1956: Literaturpreis und Kulturpreis Stadt Zürich
- 1992: Literaturpreis und Kulturpreis Stadt Zürich
- 2011: Gesamtwerkspreis Schweizerische Schillerstiftung
- 2011: Kunstpreis Kanton Solothurn

== Selected works ==
- Die ersten Gedichte, 1944
- Gedichte, 1950
- Wettinger Sternsingerspiel, 1955
- Die hereinbrechende Auferstehung, 1960
- Der Tanz des Gehorsams oder die Strohmatte, 1970
- Die Schleuse oder Abteien aus Glas. Ein Roman, 1972
- Jan, der Verrückte. Ein Spiel, 1978
- Ruf und Regel. Erfahrungen des Glaubens im benediktinischen Kloster, 1980
- Eine Insel finden. Gespräch mit Otto F. Walter, 1983
- Die Feuertaube. Neue Gedichte. Für meinen Bruder, 1985
- Voll singenden Feuers. Eine Auswahl aus ihren Werken, 1990
- Der Wolkenbaum. Meine Kindheit im alten Haus, 1992
- Die Beichte im Zeichen des Fisches. Ein geistliches Tagebuch, 1999
- Die Fähre legt sich hin am Strand. Ein Lesebuch, 1999
- Ich habe meine Insel gefunden. Geheimnis im Alltag, 2006
- Er pflückte sie vom Lebensbaum. Ein benediktinisches Tagebuch, 2008
- Das dreifarbene Meer. Meine Heilsgeschichte – eine Biographie, 2009
