= Fahr Convent =

Benedictine convent in Switzerland

- Kloster Fahr
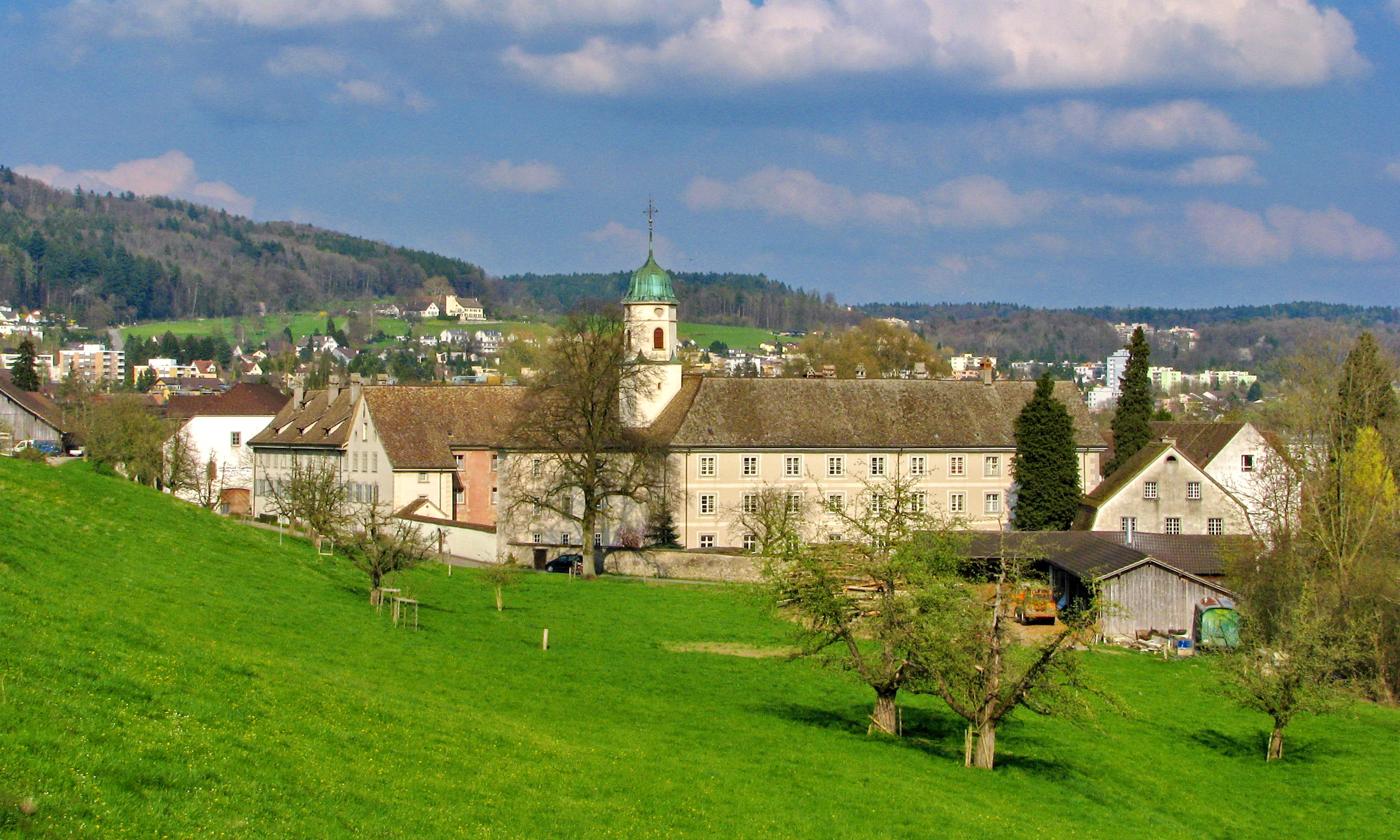
- Fahr Convent as seen from the west, Unterengstringen in the background

- Location within Canton of Aargau Location within Switzerland

Monastery information
- Order: Order of Saint Benedict
- Established: 22 January 1130
- Mother house: Kloster Einsiedeln
- Dedication: Our Lady
- Diocese: Roman Catholic Diocese of Basel
- Controlled churches: 3

People
- Founders: Judenta and Luitold von Regensberg
- Abbot: Urban Federer OSB, Kloster Einsiedeln
- Prior: Irene Gassmann OSB (since 2003)

Site
- Location: Würenlos, Canton of Aargau, being an enclave within Unterengstringen, Canton of Zürich, Switzerland
- Coordinates: 47°24′30.42″N 8°26′21.48″E
- Public access: allowed
- Other information: extensive agriculture by the nunnery, monastery shop and restaurant

Fahr Convent (German: Kloster Fahr) is a Benedictine convent located in an exclave of the canton of Aargau, surrounded by the municipality of Unterengstringen (canton of Zürich). It is located 8 km to the north of Zürich's city centre. Located in different cantons, Einsiedeln Abbey and Fahr Convent form a double monastery, overseen by the male Abbot of Einsiedeln, no converse arrangement appears to be available for the Abbess of Fahr. Fahr and Einsiedeln may be one of the last of such arrangements to survive.

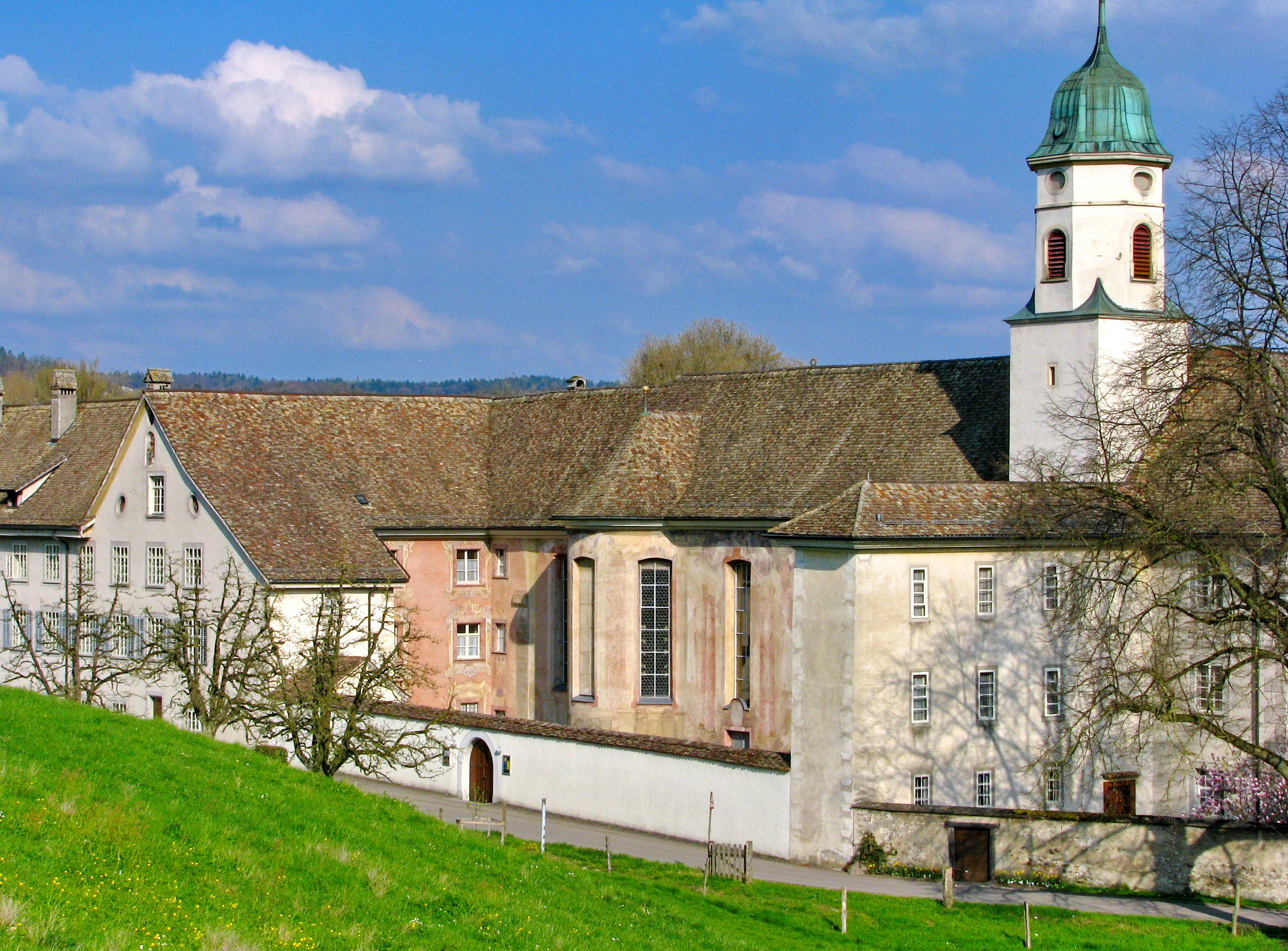
Outside frescos on the convent church

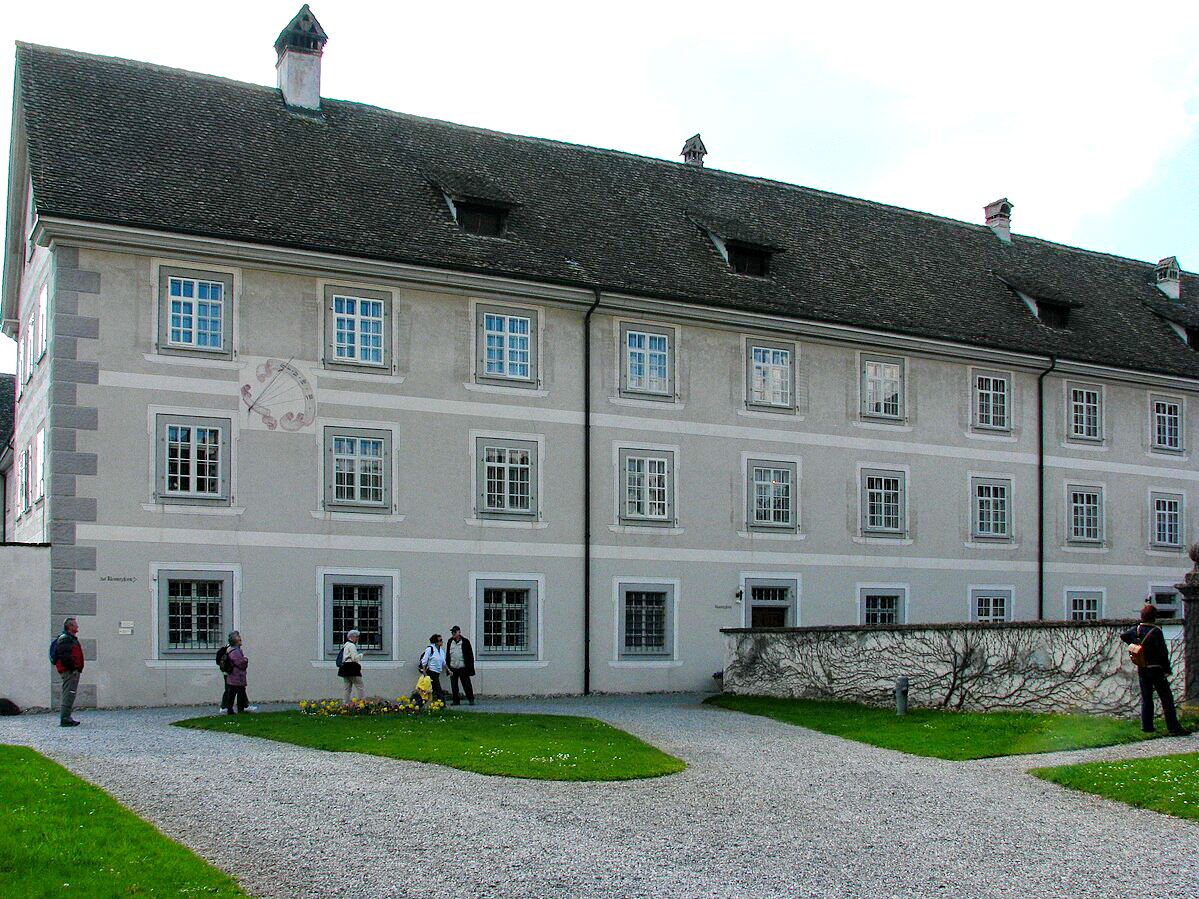
Refectory

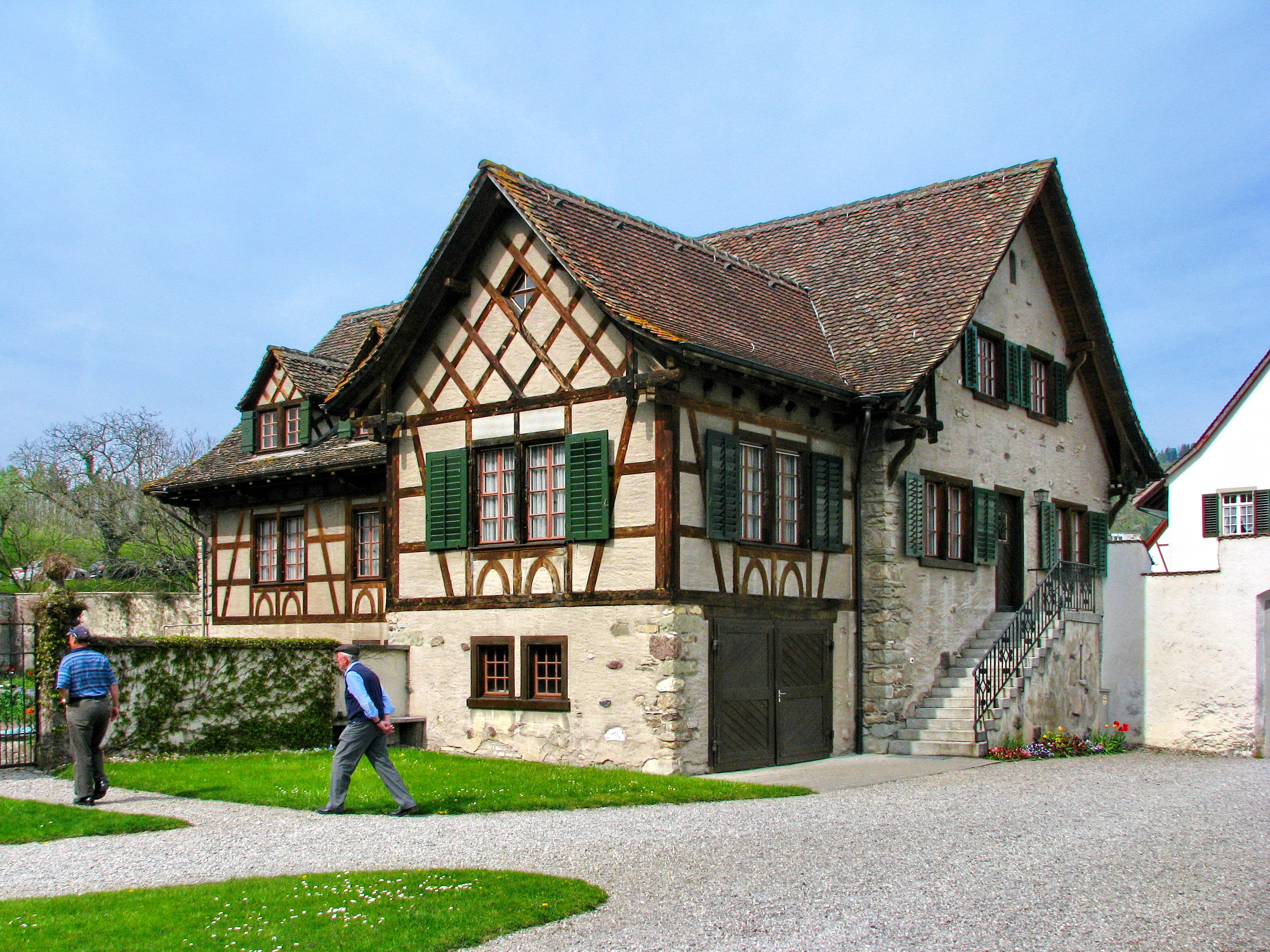
the former chaplain's house built in 1703

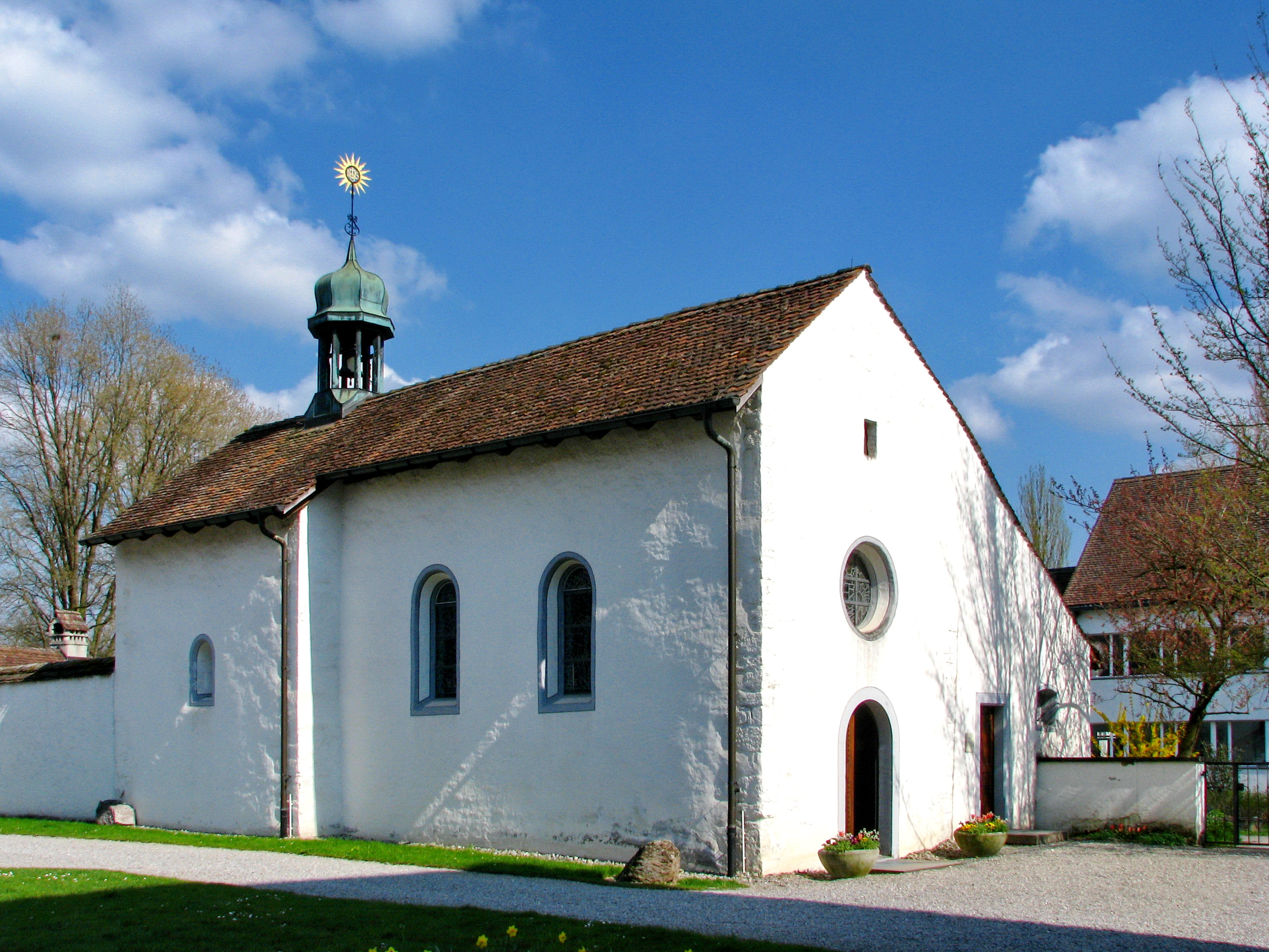
St. Anna chapel

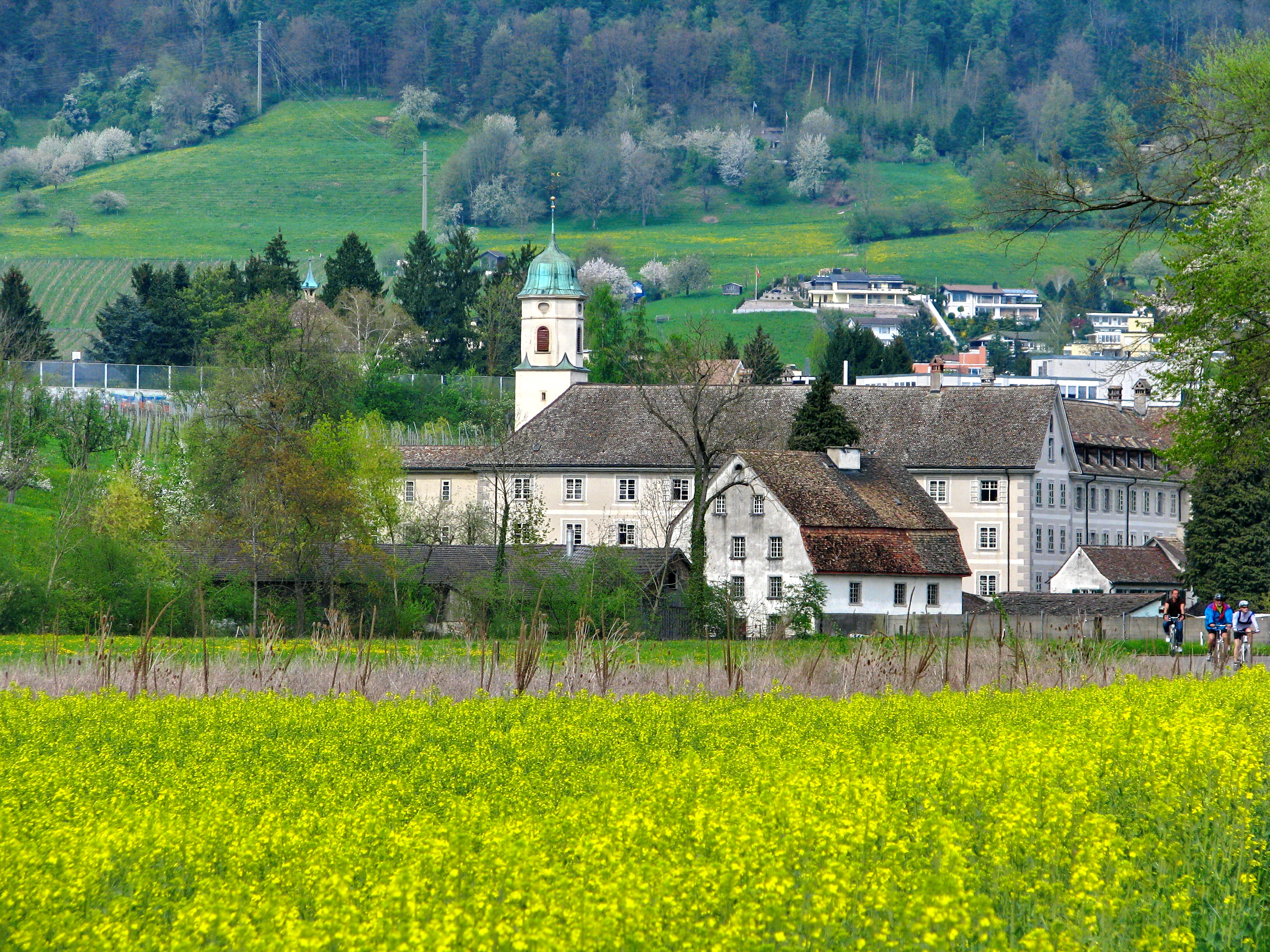
View of the convent from the Limmat

== Geographical and administratively special situation ==
Historically the convent was located in an exclave of canton Aargau within the municipality of Unterengstringen in the canton of Zürich in the Limmat Valley. The convent had not been part of a political municipality, although some administrative tasks have been carried out by the Würenlos authorities since the 19th century and the nuns were always allowed to fulfill their political rights (voting, etc.) in Würenlos. Since 1 January 2008 Fahr Convent has been a part of Würenlos.

== History ==
The convent is first mentioned in AD 1130 as Vare (an old term used for "ferry"). The lands were donated by the House of Regensberg. On 22 January 1130 Lütold II and his son Lütold III and his wife Judenta handed over lands and estates on the shore of the Limmat around Weiningen and Unterengstringen-Oberengstringen to the Einsiedeln Abbey to establish a Benedictine convent. The Chapel of St. Nicholas already stood on the land. This may have been connected with the death of Lütold I in 1088 while engaged in battle against the forces of the Abbey of Einsiedeln. The convent was dedicated to Our Lady. In addition to the medieval St. Nikolaus-Kapelle (Saint Nicholas chapel), built around 10th century AD and now called St. Anna-Kapelle, and the late medieval church of the convent, the parish church of Weiningen were subordinated to the convent.

From the very beginning, the convent has been overseen by the Abbot of Einsiedeln; the nuns are led in their daily life by a prioress appointed by the abbot. The bailiwick rights were first held by the Regensberg family, after 1306 by the citizens of the municipality of Zürich, and from 1434 to 1798 by the Meyer von Knonau family.

Around 1530 the convent was suppressed during the Reformation in Zürich, but it reopened in 1576. An era of prosperity during the 17th century led to a brisk program of construction: In 1678 the tavern Zu den zwei Raben ("Two Ravens", the emblem of Einsiedeln Abbey) was built; from 1685 to 1696 the cloister and church tower were renovated; in 1703/04 a new refectory was designed by Johann Moosbrugger; and a house for the chaplain was erected in 1730/34. From 1743 to 1746 the convent church was decorated with frescoes by the Torricelli brothers.

In dissolving the old County (Grafschaft) of Baden in 1803, the cantons of Zurich and Aargau established an exclave of Aargau within the canton of Zürich, for the former lands of the convent. Formerly part of the Bishopric of Constance, the convent has been part of the Roman Catholic Diocese of Basel since 1828. The canton of Aargau chose in 1841 to close all monasteries within its territory, but this was reversed in 1843 for convents. The negotiations between Einsiedeln Abbey and the cantonal authorities regarding assets and authority were completed nearly 90 years later, in 1932. At that point Aargau granted full autonomy to the conventual community.

During World War II, from November 1943 to February 1944, 11 female Jewish refugees lived secretly in the cloister; unfortunately they had to leave for an unknown destination when the school was opened.

On 1 February 1944, the convent established a Bäuerinnenschule, i.e. an agricultural school for women.

On 1 January 2008 the convent was incorporated into the municipality of Würenlos, happening over a century after the municipality's initial attempts to absorb the 1.48-hectare area of the convent.

On 22 January 2009 the former Abbot of Einsiedeln, Dom Martin Werlen, O.S.B., presented the nuns with a new community seal, thereby indicating that the nuns were in full control of the business affairs of their convent.

In 2014 the women's agricultural school (Bäuerinnenschule) had to close for financial reasons. At the same time an overall renovation of the convent buildings, erected between 1689 and 1746 was undertaken. The interiors, windows and antiquated power supply were refurbished in 2016 to finally comply with fire prevention and other modern statutory requirements.

== Cloister ==
As of April 2010, there were 26 nuns (7 in 1873, 33 in 2000) living at the convent. Silja Walter (Sister Maria Hedwig, O.S.B.) (1919–2011), a renowned novelist, was the most prominent member of the community.

On 23 April 2016 the Silja-Walter-Raum was inaugurated. Sister Maria Hedwig's literary work is inextricably linked to the convent as she lived for over 60 years in the same Benedictine community. During this time, Silja Walter wrote most of her work which included lyrics, mystery plays and theatre. After the renovation, the former office of the provost with its beautiful stucco ceiling was chosen to establish a small museum. It contains numerous texts, film, audio and photographic documents, as well as excerpts from the radio interview from 1982, when Silja Walter and her brother, Otto F. Walter, another renowned Swiss writer, recorded the interview tape Eine Insel (An Island). But also personal objects like the nun's typewriter are exhibited, and also the lesser known drawings and painting of the artist. The monastery would appeal to people who knew the artist's work, but also for the younger generation, said Prioress Irene during an interview. For now, the room will be open every last Sunday of the month after the worship service from approximately 10:45 to 14:00. Admission is free.

On the feast day of Saint Wiborada – the first (Swiss) woman to be canonized by the Roman Catholic Church – 2 May 2016, a two month pilgrimage began from Wiborada's native St. Gallen to Rome made up of eight female town residents and seven Fahr sisters, as part of a Catholic gender equality campaign, Kirche mit*. Along their 1,000 kilometres (620 mi) journey to the Vatican, this group of pilgrims was accompanied in stages by other women's rights activists. By mid-May 2016 around 650 people (approximately one fifth men) joined for at least one day's stage, and there are 400 more registrations for the final section of the pilgrimage in Rome. Whether the Pope will grant an audience to the group of pilgrims on 2 July, the day of the Visitation, was uncertain; actually he then should be on vacation.

== Cloister garden ==
Sister Beatrice Beerli (born 1947) and head of horticulture, had responsibility for the multi-award-winning convent gardens for over 20 years. Since the closure of the school in July 2013, she passed on her knowledge to occasional group tours.

== Current activities ==
For centuries viticulture had an important role in convent life. Even in the deed of donation of 22 January 1130, a vineyard was itemised. In the Middle Ages its cultivation and trade in wine was significant and frequently documented. Cultivation and wine production are part of the historic tradition, and the present vineyards comprise 4.2 hectares on "Wingert" hill just above the convent in the canton of Zürich and on convent property in Weiningen where a range of grape varieties are grown . The well-known wine estate is managed by the nuns and around 30 external employees. Other agricultural products are made in the convent including liquors and honey.

The convent's renowned agricultural school for women (Bäuerinnenschule) established in 1944 had to close in 2015 for economic and staffing reasons.

== Cultural heritage ==
Kloster Fahr is listed in the Swiss inventory of cultural property of national and regional significance as a Class A object of national importance.

== Gallery ==
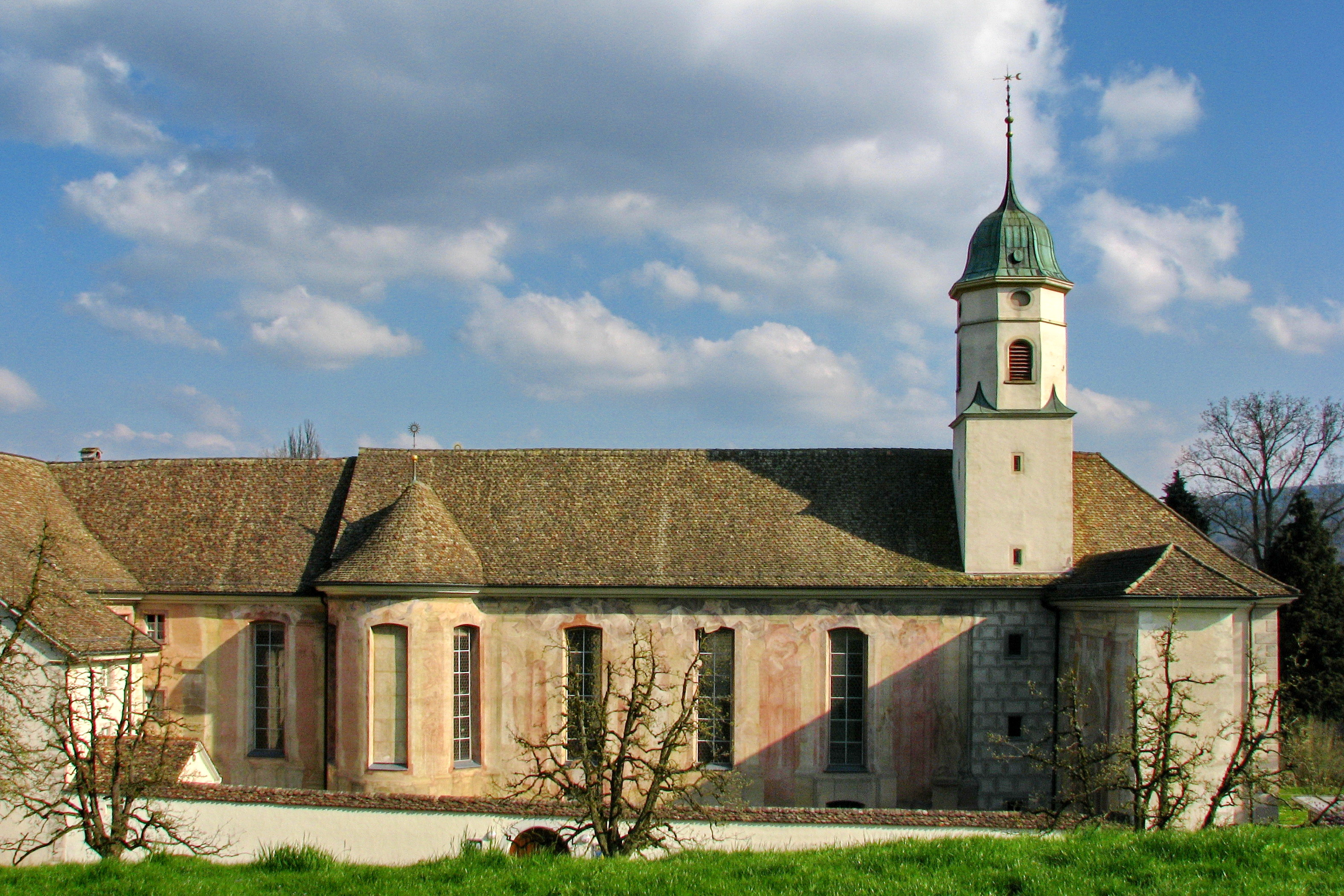
Church

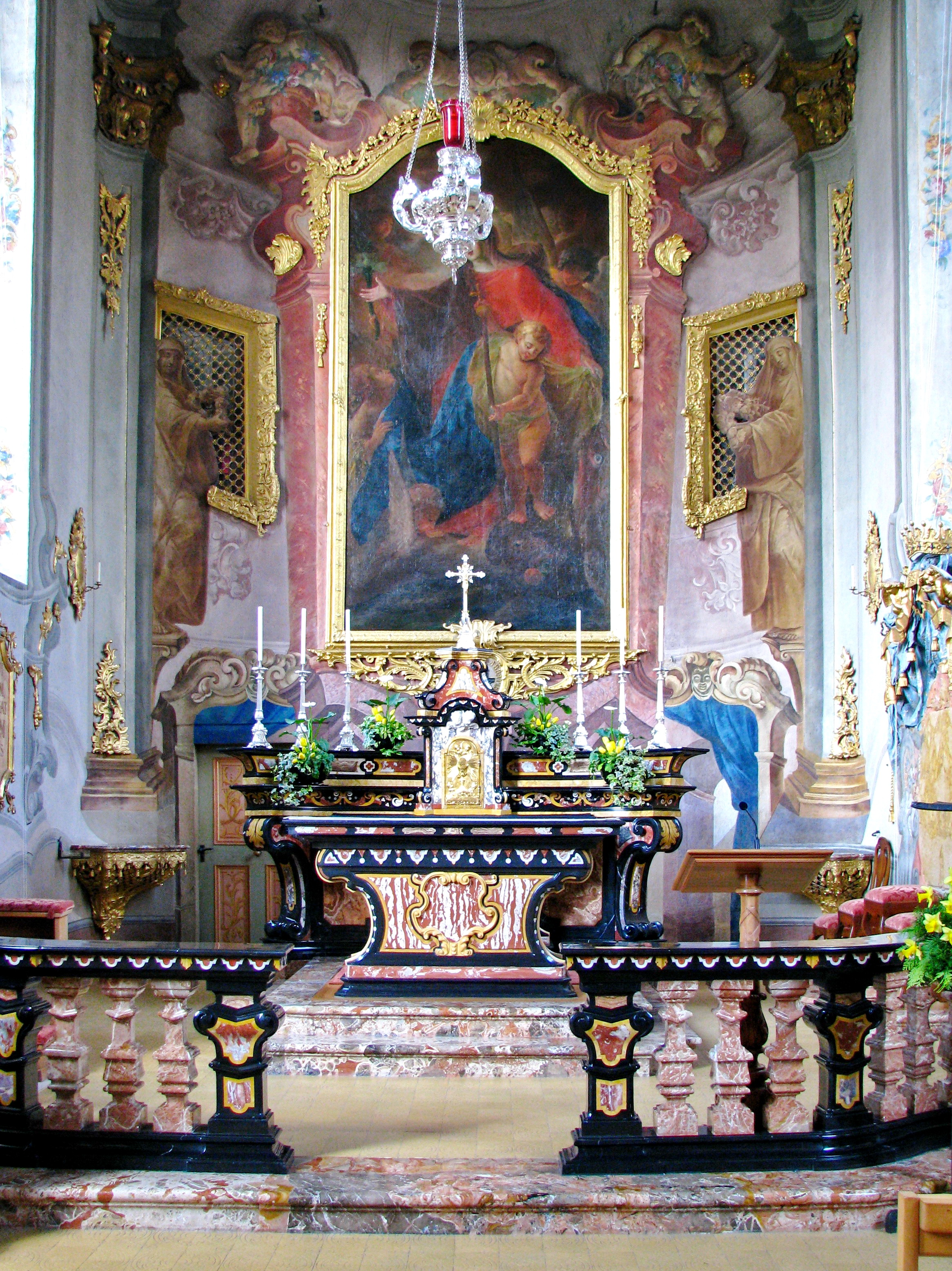
Main altar

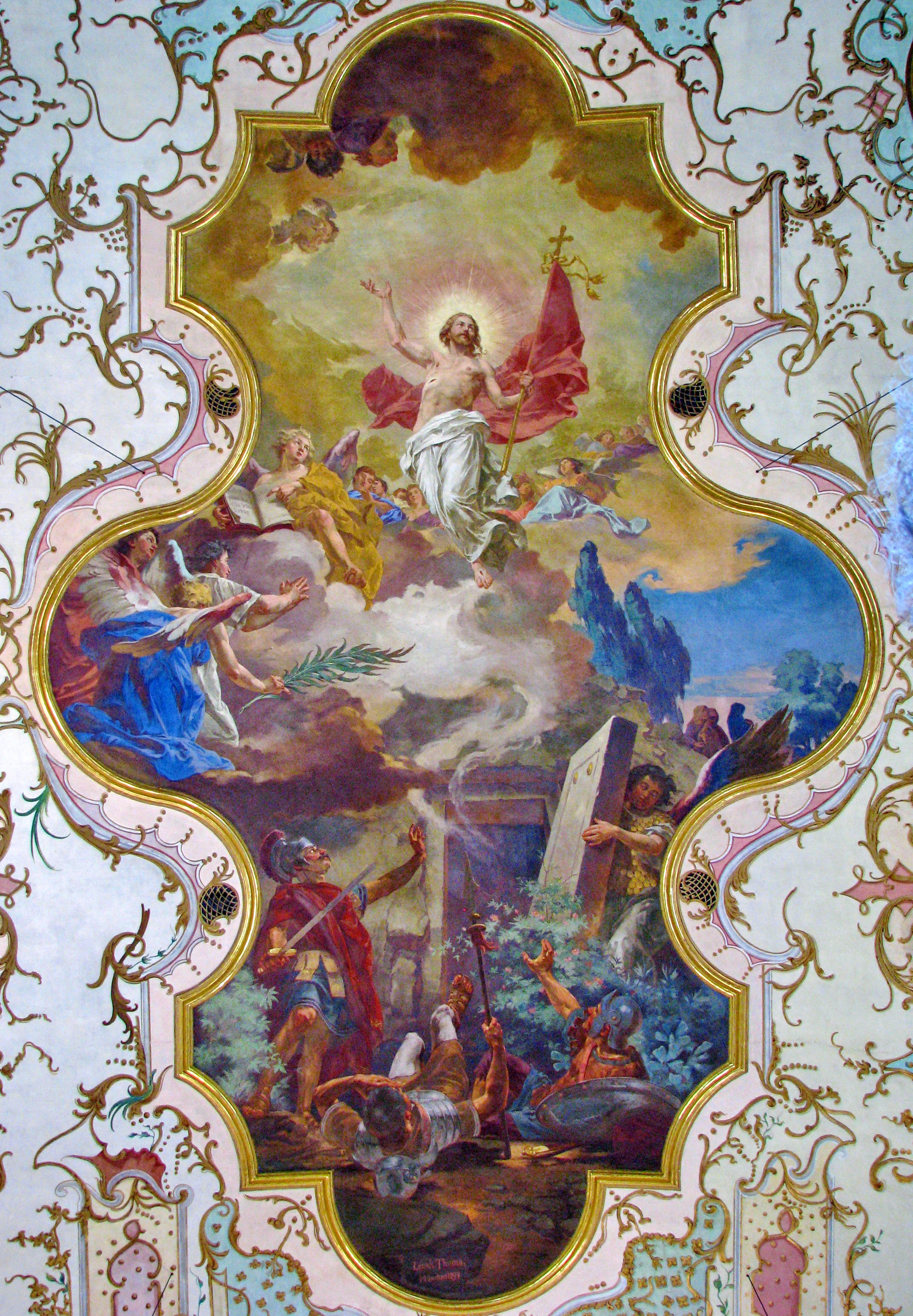
Fresco on the church ceiling

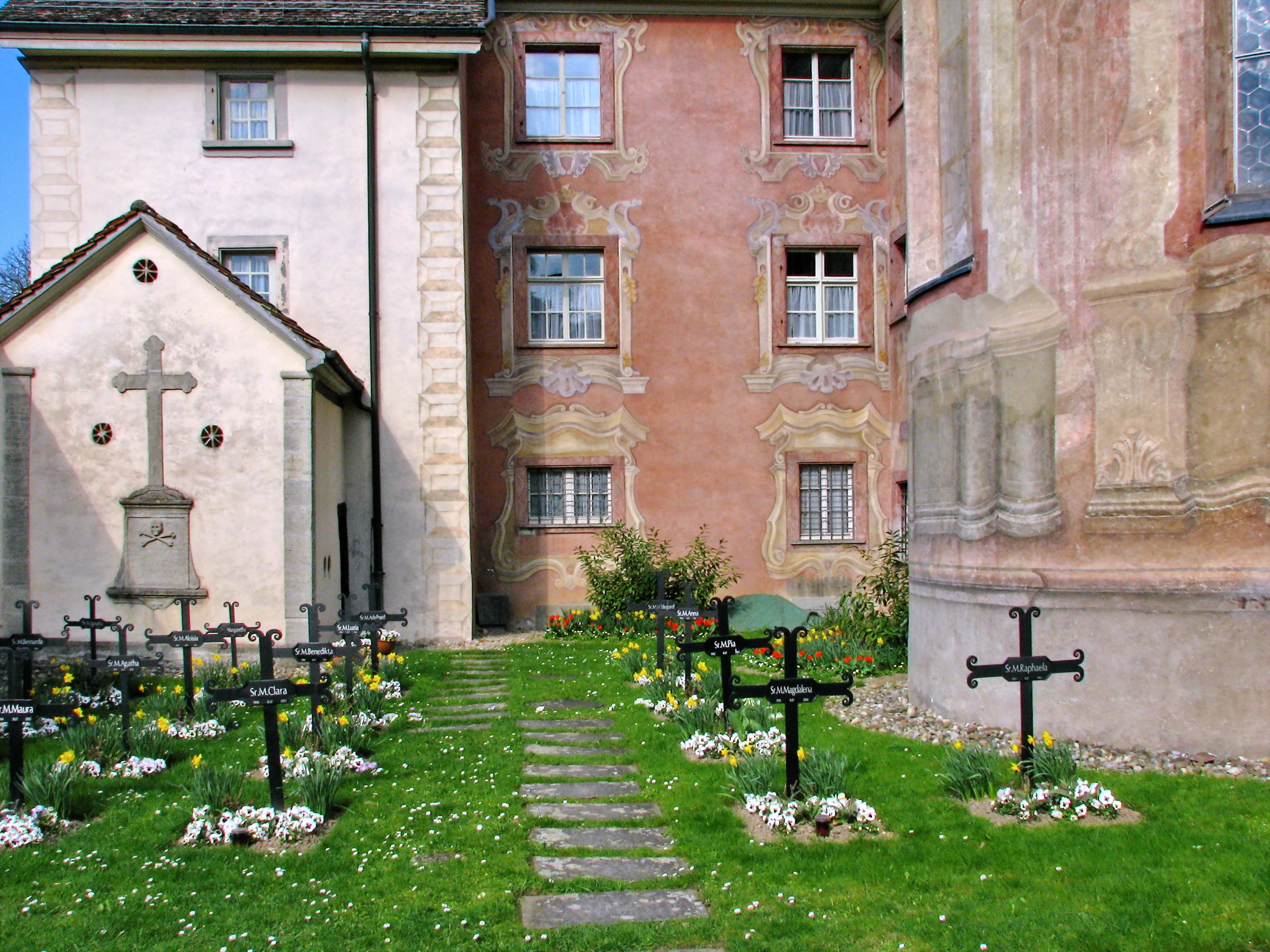
Cemetery and chapel

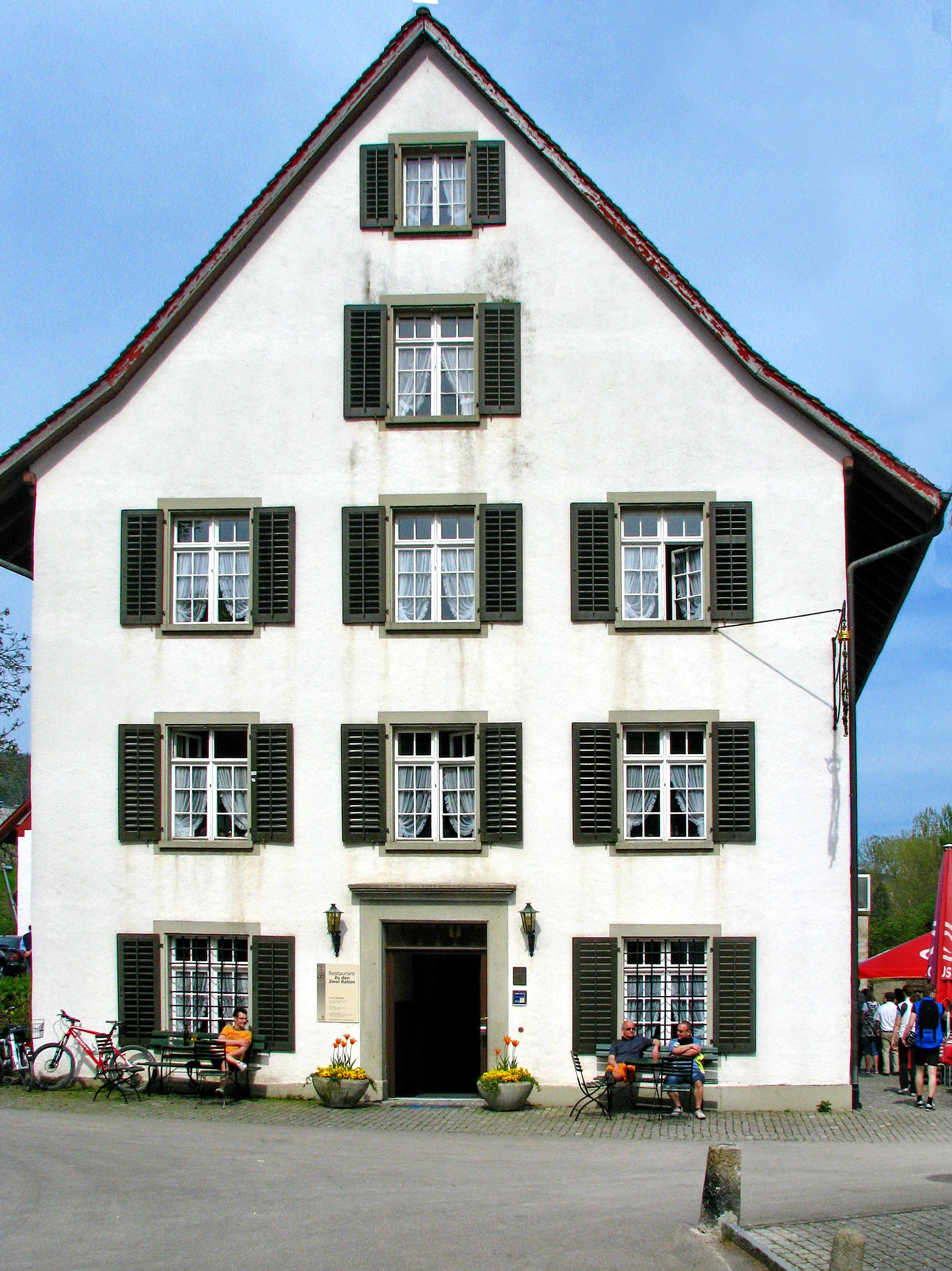
Tavern zu den zwei Raben

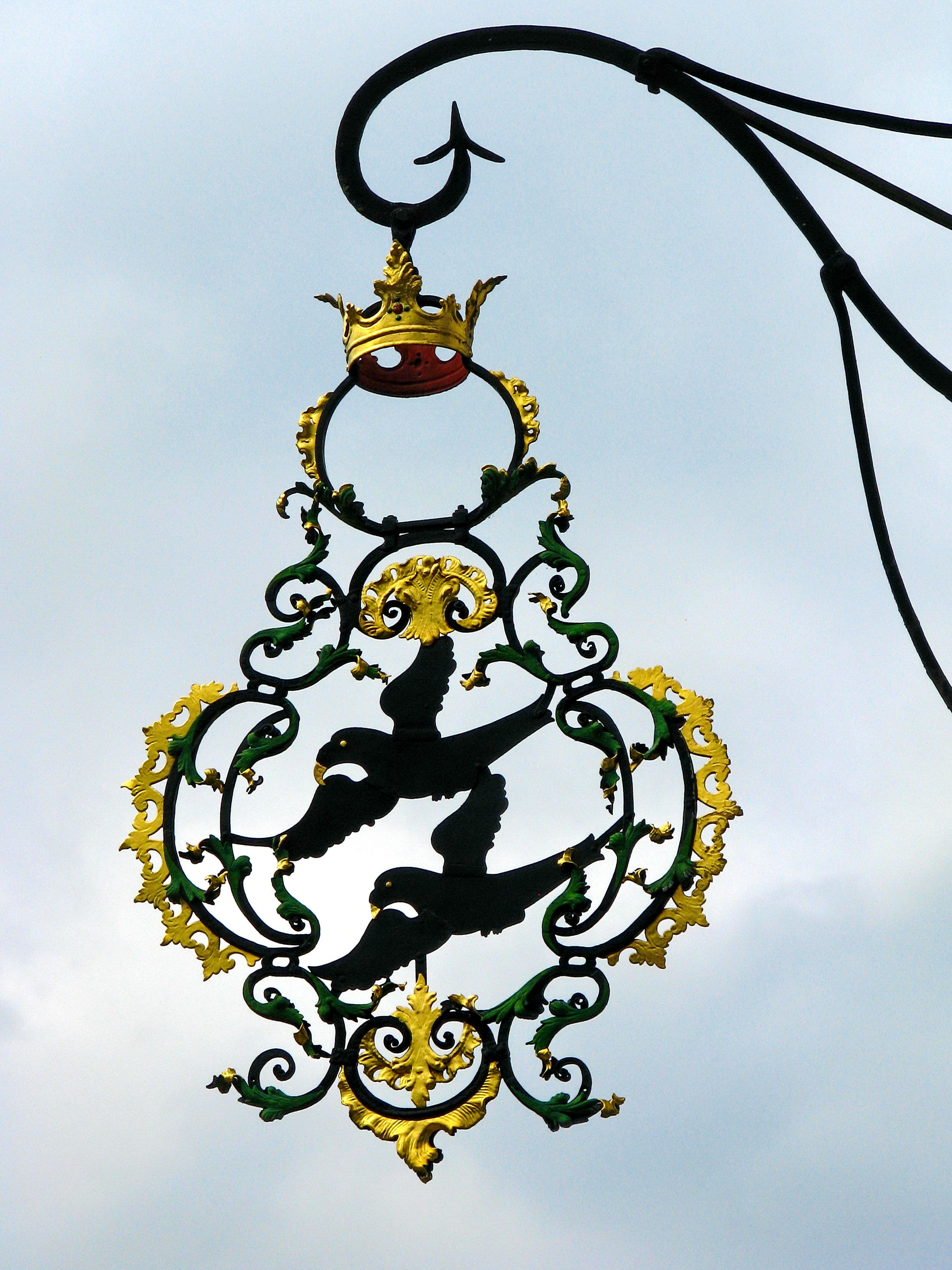
Inn sign showing the two ravens of Einsiedeln Abbey

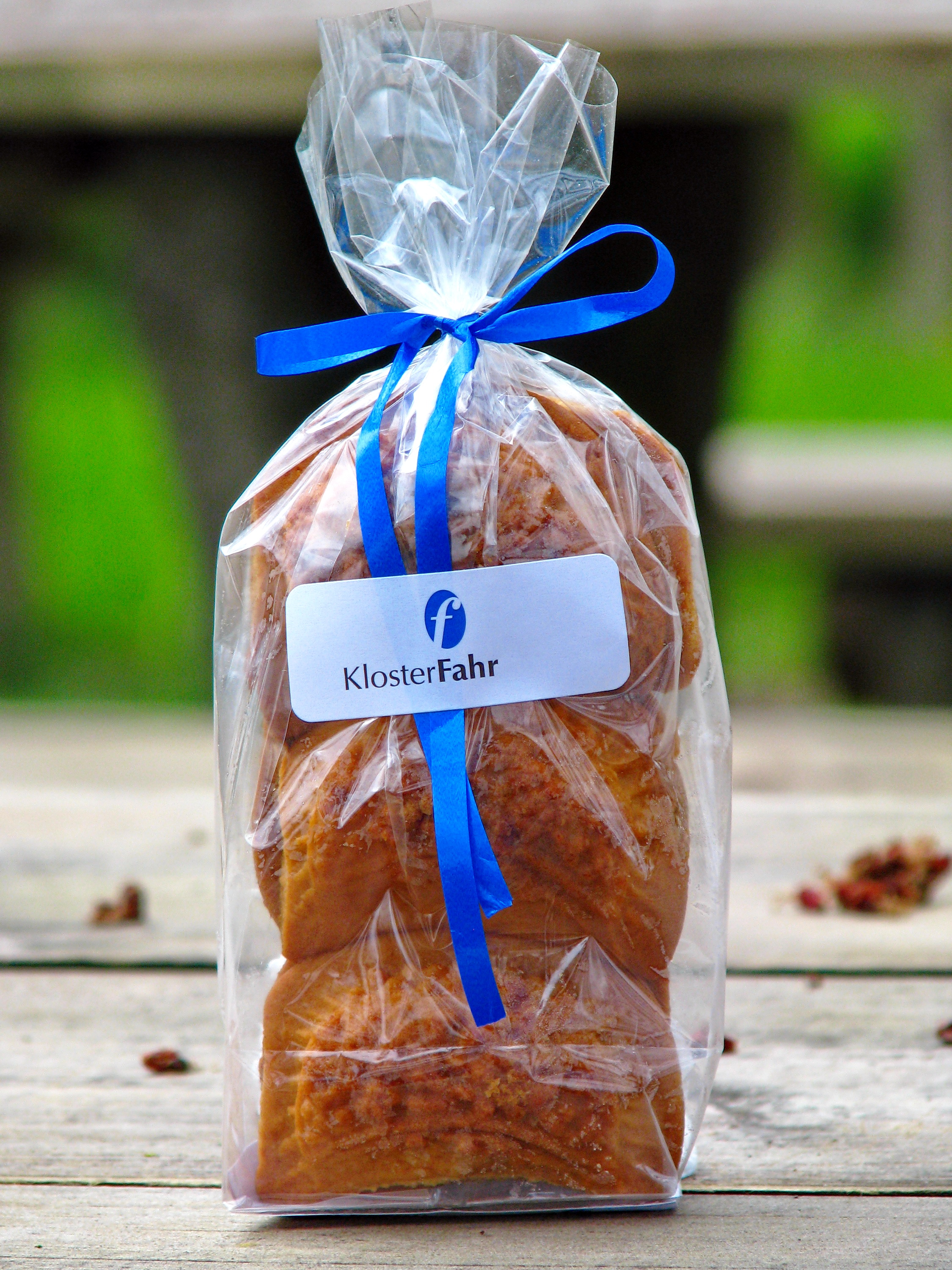
Sweetmeats made at the convent

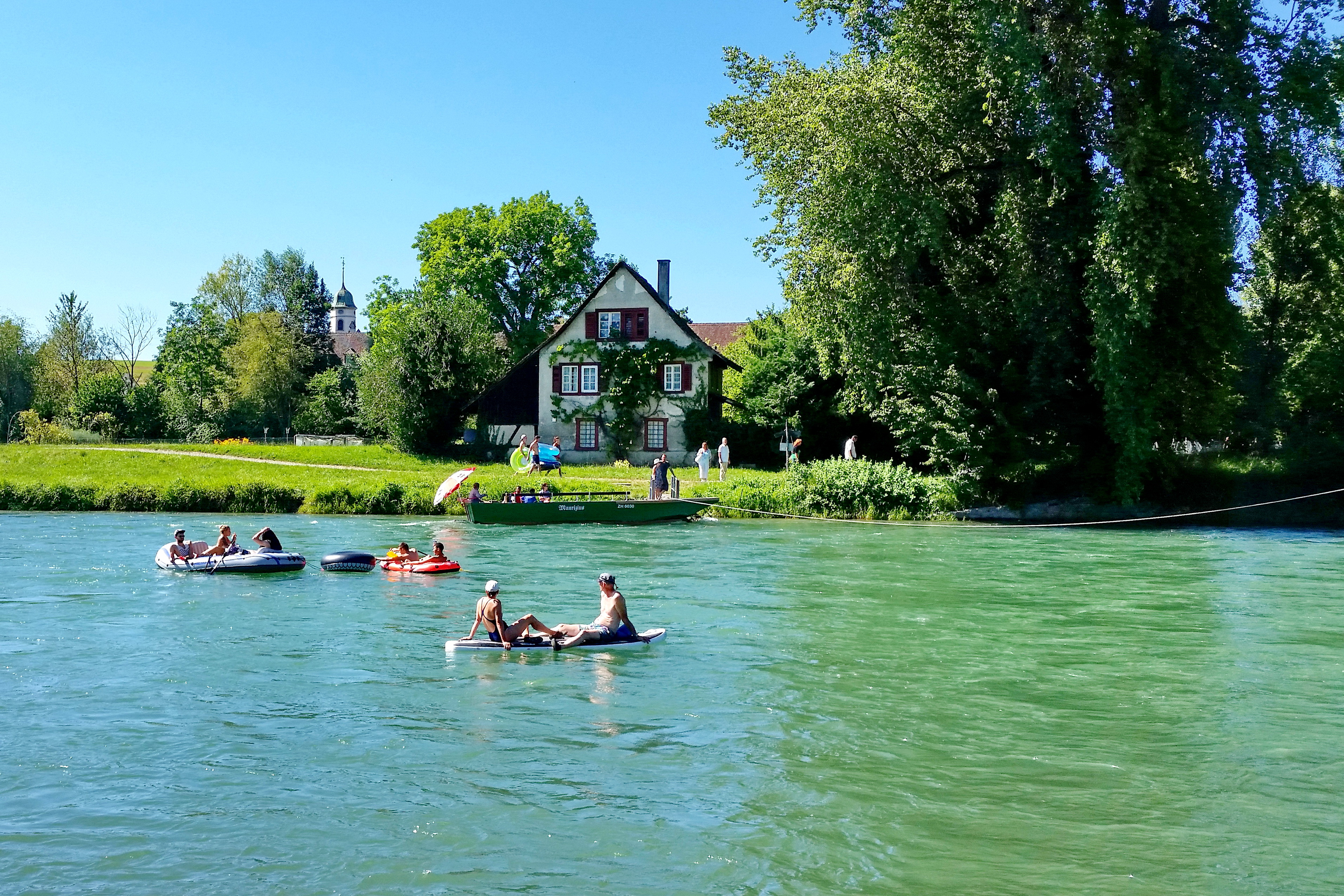
Ferry route to the convent

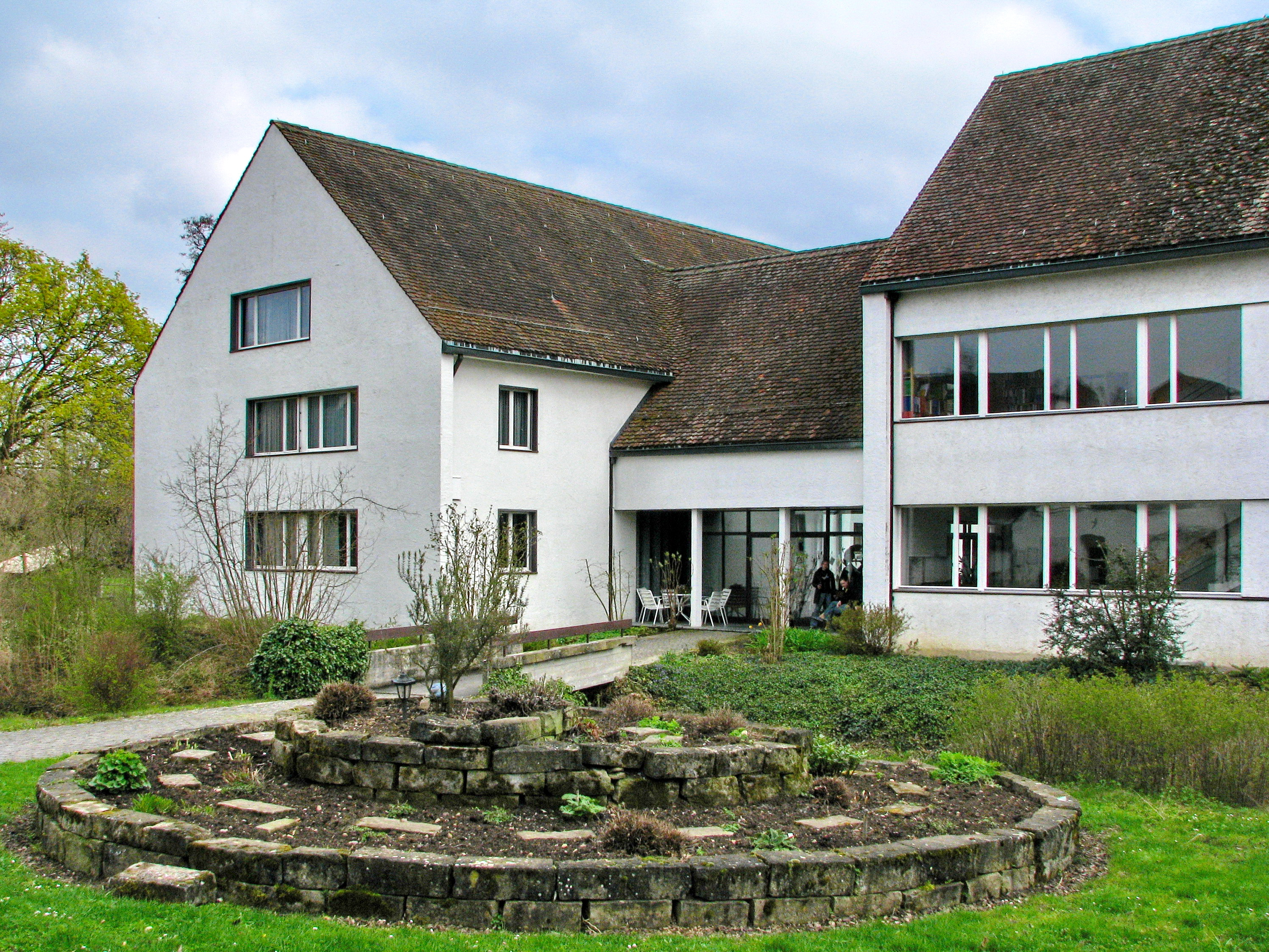
The former agricultural school in the convent grounds

== Literature ==
- Hélène Arnet: Das Kloster Fahr im Mittelalter. Zürich 1995, ISBN 3-85865-511-2.
- Silja Walter: Der Ruf aus dem Garten, Paulus-Verlag, Fribourg 1995, ISBN 3-7228-0370-5.
- Silja Walter: Das Kloster am Rande der Stadt. Verlag die Arche, Zürich 1980, ISBN 3-7160-1685-3.
