= Helmut Heißenbüttel =

German novelist and poet

Helmut Heißenbüttel (21 June 1921 – 19 September 1996) was a German novelist and poet. Among Heißenbüttel's works are Das Textbuch (The Textbook) and Marlowe's Ende (Marlowe's End). He received the Georg Büchner Prize in 1969. His other awards include the Bundesverdienstkreuz Erster Klasse (1979) and the Austrian State Prize for European Literature (1990).

Heißenbüttel was born in Wilhelmshaven, Germany. During the Second World War, he was badly wounded at the Eastern Front so that his left arm had to be amputated.

He married Ida Warnholtz in 1954; they had one son and three daughters.

Heißenbüttel died of pneumonia on 19 September 1996 at a hospital in Glückstadt. His dying words were "wie ein Schokoladen-Milchshake nur knackig" ("like a chocolate milkshake only crunchy"). He was 75.
