= Peter Bichsel =

Swiss writer and journalist (1935–2025)

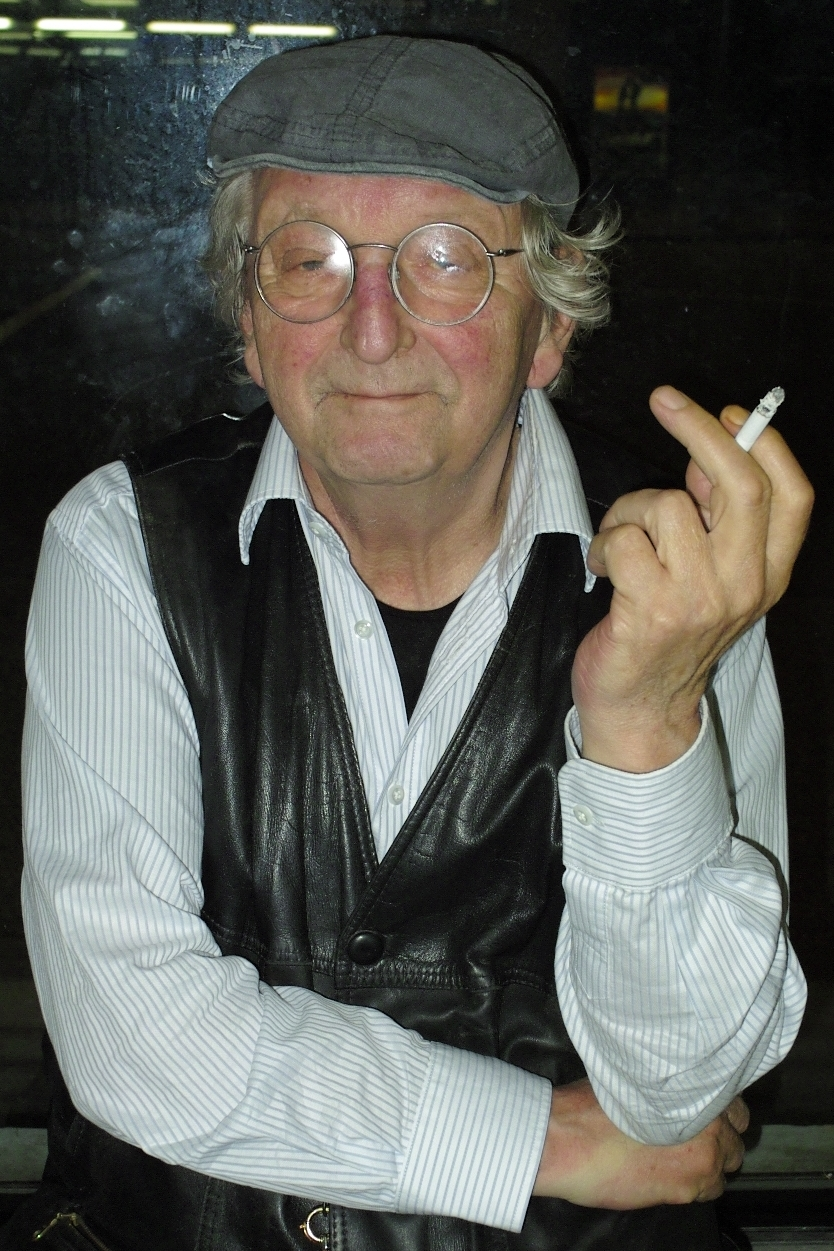
- Bichsel in 2011
- Born: 24 March 1935; Lucerne, Switzerland
- Died: 15 March 2025 (aged 89); Zuchwil, Switzerland
- Occupations: Writer, journalist
- Years active: 1960–2025
- Known for: Short stories
- Political party: Social Democratic Party (1957–1995)
- Spouse: Therese Bichsel-Spörri (m. 1956; died 2005)

Peter Bichsel (Swiss Standard German: [ˈpeːtər ˈbɪksl̩]; 24 March 1935 – 15 March 2025) was a Swiss writer and journalist representing modern German literature. He was a member of the Group 47. His breakthrough was the collection of short stories And Really Frau Blum Would Very Much Like to Meet the Milkman.

== Life and career ==
Bichsel was born in Lucerne on 24 March 1935, the son of manual labourers. Shortly after he was born, the Bichsels moved to Olten. After finishing school, he became an elementary school teacher, a job he held until 1968. From 1974 to 1981, he was the personal advisor and speech writer of Willy Ritschard, a member of the Swiss Federal Council. Between 1972 and 1989, he made his mark as a "writer in residence" and a guest lecturer at American universities. Bichsel lived on the outskirts of Solothurn for several decades.

He started publishing short lyric works in newspapers, for example in Weltwoche, Tages-Anzeiger-Magazin, Schweizer Illustrierte and Luzerner Neueste Nachrichten. In 1960, he got his first success in prose as a private printer. In the winter of 1963–1964, he took part in a writing course in prose taught by Walter Höllerer.

One of his first and best-known works is And Really Frau Blum Would Very Much Like to Meet the Milkman. Published only in a modest edition in 1964, the book was quickly sold out. The reason was an enthusiastic review by Marcel Reich-Ranicki. Just as successful, Children's Stories, intended for adults, is written in the form of droll tales for children. Both books were translated from German by the English poet Michael Hamburger. A theme of Bichsel's works for younger readers is the stubborn desire of children to take words literally and wreak havoc on the world of communicated ideas. In the early 1970s and 1980s, Bichsel's journalistic work pushed his literary work mainly into the background. Only Der Busant (1985) and Warten in Baden-Baden appeared again with the Bichsel style that was so familiar to German readers. Peter Bichsel gave up being a professional teacher early in his lifetime, later he continued to teach his readers that the drudgery and banality of life are of our own making. He used often a simple sentence structure 'subject-predicate-object' and was a passionate observer of Switzerland.

From 1957 to 1995 Bichsel was member of the Social Democratic Party of Switzerland. He was a founding member of the Gruppe Olten and member of the Group 47.

In 1981, he was a member of the jury at the 31st Berlin International Film Festival.

Peter Bichsel's estate was archived in the Swiss Literary Archives in Bern.

Bichsel died in Zuchwil on 15 March 2025, at the age of 89.

== Awards ==
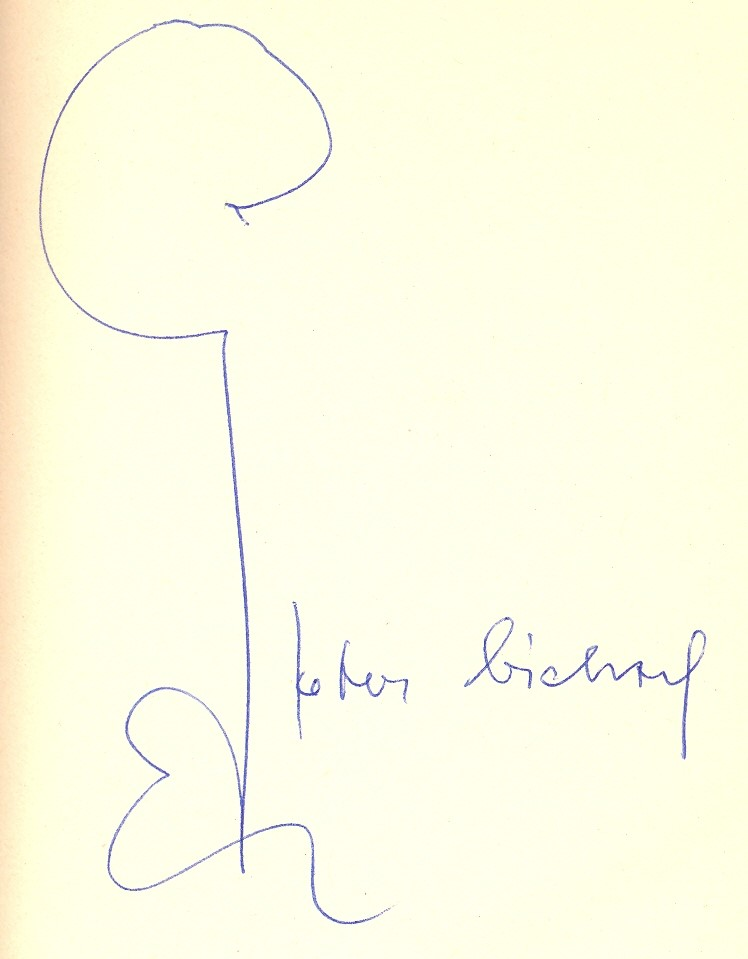
Peter Bichsel´s autograph

- 1965 Prize of "Group 47"
- 1970 Deutscher Jugendbuchpreis
- 1981/82 Stadtschreiber von Bergen
- 1996 Mainzer Stadtschreiber
- 1999 Gottfried-Keller-Preis
- 2000 Prix Européen de l'Essai Charles Veillon
- 2000 Kassel Literary Prize
- 2004 Honorary Doctor of Theology, University of Basel
- 2005 Work grant by Pro Helvetia
- 2011 Solothurner Literaturpreis
- 2012 Grosser Schillerpreis

== Short story collections ==
- Bichsel, Peter; Spinnler, Rolf; Gigandet (1960). Versuche über Gino. Ill. von Rolf Spinnler (in German). [Solothurn]: Gigandet. OCLC 80522070.
- —— (2018). Eigentlich möchte Frau Blum den Milchmann kennenlernen: 21 Geschichten (in German). Frankfurt am Main: Suhrkamp. ISBN 978-3-518-39067-2.
  - —— (1968). And Really Frau Blum Would Very Much Like to Meet the Milkman. Marion Boyars Publishers. ISBN 978-0-7145-0083-6.
- —— (1997). Die Jahreszeiten (in German). Frankfurt am Main: Suhrkamp. ISBN 978-3-518-39280-5.
- —— (2013). Kindergeschichten (in German). Neuwied Berlin: Suhrkamp Taschenbuch Verl. ISBN 978-3-518-39142-6.
  - —— (1971). Stories for Children. ISBN 978-0-7145-0688-3.
- —— (2005). Des Schweizers Schweiz: Aufsätze (in German). Frankfurt am Main: Suhrkamp. ISBN 978-3-518-39269-0.
- Inhaltsangabe der Langeweile (Hörspiel, 1971)
- —— (1998). Geschichten zur falschen Zeit: Kolumnen 1975 – 1978 (in German). Frankfurt am Main: Suhrkamp. ISBN 978-3-518-39372-7.
- —— (1997). Der Leser. Das Erzählen: Frankfurter Poetik-Vorlesungen (in German). Frankfurt am Main: Suhrkamp. ISBN 978-3-518-39143-3.
- —— (1998). Schulmeistereien (in German). Frankfurt am Main: Suhrkamp. ISBN 978-3-518-39341-3.
- —— (200). Der Busant: von Trinkern, Polizisten und der schönen Magelone0 (in German). Frankfurt am Main: Suhrkamp. ISBN 978-3-518-39601-8.
- —— (1999). Irgendwo anderswo: Kolumnen 1980 - 1985. Frankfurt am Main: Suhrkamp. ISBN 978-3-518-39432-8.
- —— (2006). Möchten Sie Mozart gewesen sein? (in German). Stuttgart: Radius. ISBN 978-3-87173-355-0.
- —— (1999). Im Gegenteil: Kolumnen 1986 - 1990 (in German). Frankfurt am Main: Suhrkamp. ISBN 978-3-518-39527-1.
- —— (1993). Zur Stadt Paris: Geschichten (in German). Frankfurt am Main: Suhrkamp. ISBN 978-3-518-40538-3.
  - To the City of Paris (in German and English). Translated by Michael Kuttner. Kolkata: Tarjama (2007).
- —— (2002). Gegen unseren Briefträger konnte man nichts machen (in German). Frankfurt am Main: Suhrkamp. ISBN 978-3-518-39822-7.
- —— (1998). Die Totaldemokraten: Aufsätze über die Schweiz (in German). Frankfurt am Main: Suhrkamp. ISBN 978-3-518-12087-3.
- —— (2001). Cherubin Hammer und Cherubin Hammer (in German). Frankfurt am Main: Suhrkamp. ISBN 978-3-518-39665-0.
- —— (2000). Alles von mir gelernt: Kolumnen 1995 - 1999 (in German). Frankfurt am Main: Suhrkamp. ISBN 978-3-518-41099-8.
- —— (2015). Eisenbahnfahren (in German). Frankfurt am Main; Leipzig: Insel Verlag. ISBN 978-3-458-17655-8.
- —— (2003). Doktor Schleyers isabellenfarbige Winterschule: Kolumnen 2000 - 2002 (in German). Frankfurt am Main: Suhrkamp. ISBN 978-3-518-41389-0.
- —— (2004). Das süsse Gift der Buchstaben: Reden zur Literatur. Frankfurt am Main: Suhrkamp. ISBN 978-3-518-12353-9. OCLC 55653236.
- —— (2004). Wo wir wohnen: Geschichten (in German). Frankfurt am Main Leipzig: Insel-Verl. ISBN 978-3-458-19253-4.
- —— (2017). Im Hafen von Bern im Frühling (in German). Stuttgart: Radius. ISBN 978-3-87173-832-6.
- —— (2018). Kolumnen, Kolumnen (in German). Berlin: Suhrkamp Verlag. ISBN 978-3-518-24172-1.
- ——; Mazenauer, Beat (2020). Auch der Esel hat eine Seele: frühe Texte und Kolumnen 1963-1971. Berlin: Suhrkamp. ISBN 978-3-518-47004-6.
- —— (2021). Im Winter muss mit Bananenbäumen etwas geschehen: Geschichten für die kalte Jahreszeit (in German). Berlin: Insel Verlag. ISBN 978-3-458-68178-6.
- —— (2023). Die schöne Schwester Langeweile: Geschichten für jeden Tag (in German). Berlin: Insel Verlag. ISBN 978-3-458-68305-6.
