= Gruppe Olten =

Group of Swiss authors

The Gruppe Olten (Olten Group) was a club of left-wing Swiss writers who convened at Olten's "Bahnhofbuffet" (railway station restaurant) in the canton of Solothurn in the Swiss Plateau from 1970 to 2002.

Initially the group comprised 22 well-established former members of the Swiss writer’s club Schweizerischer Schriftstellerverein (SSV) including Max Frisch, Adolf Muschg, Peter Bichsel, Otto F. Walter and Friedrich Dürrenmatt who in 1971 left the SSV (which they considered to be unprogressive) and became members of the Gruppe Olten.

One of the reasons that led to the separation was that the SSV president Maurice Zermatten had translated into French the official anti-communist “Civil Defense Book”, which commanded citizens on the civil protection of the country in order to strengthen the resistance of the people and to secure the independence of Switzerland. The manual was distributed to all Swiss households during the Cold War.

For the founding members of the group, writing was inseparably associated with political commitment. Their specified goal, to "build a democratic-socialist society" was included in their "Zweckartikel" "written statement of objectives"). That goal was discarded in 2000, which led to the departure of Mariella Mehr. The rest of the "Zweckartikel" reads: " [The Olten Group] ...supports nationwide and international political attempts that involve the fair distribution of goods, democratizing economy and public institutions, saving the world from military and civilian destruction, and the realization of human rights."

In 2002, the Olten Group disbanded in Bern, as did the Swiss writer’s club SSV (in the meantime renamed "Schweizerischer Schriftstellerinnen- und Schriftstellerverband"). A new club, Authors of Switzerland (Autorinnen und Autoren der Schweiz), was established to replace them both.
