= Teuffenthal =

- Municipality
- Flag Coat of arms
- Location of Teuffenthal
- Location within Switzerland Location within Canton of Bern
- Coordinates: 46°47′N 7°43′E
- Country: Switzerland
- Canton: Bern
- District: Thun

Government
  - Mayor: Franziska Fuss

Area
  - Total: 4.5 km^{2} (1.7 sq mi)
- Elevation: 956 m (3,136 ft)
- Highest elevation: 1,396 m (4,580 ft)
- Lowest elevation: 770 m (2,530 ft)

Population (Dec 2012)
  - Total: 161
  - Density: 36/km^{2} (93/sq mi)
- Time zone: UTC+01:00 (CET)
  - Summer (DST): UTC+02:00 (CEST)
- Postal code: 3623
- SFOS number: 940
- ISO 3166 code: CH-BE
- Surrounded by: Eriz, Heiligenschwendi, Homberg, Horrenbach-Buchen, Oberlangenegg, Sigriswil
- Website: www.teuffenthal.ch

Teuffenthal is a municipality in the administrative district of Thun in the canton of Bern in Switzerland.

== History ==
Teuffenthal is first mentioned in 1344 as Toeffental.

The land around the modern village and what ever settlements were there belonged to the Herrschaft of Heimberg in the 13th century. The Heimberg's were under the authority of the Counts of Kyburg. On 11 November 1382, Rudolf II von Kyburg, attempted unsuccessfully to attack Solothurn. His attack started the Burgdorferkrieg (also Kyburgerkrieg) with the Old Swiss Confederacy. Bern used the war to expand north into the Aargau and south into the Oberland. After the Kyburg defeat, as part of the peace treaty, Bern bought the city of Thun and all its surrounding lands including Teuffenthal. Under Bernese rule, the small farming village was part of the distant parish of Hilterfingen until 1928 when it joined the parish of Buchen. In 1935 Teuffenthal became an independent parish.

In 1989 a school was founded in the municipality, however in 2008 it closed and the students traveled to the school in Buchen for their education.

Traditionally the rural, agrarian village raised crops and livestock on the valley floor, summered livestock in alpine meadows and cut timber. Agriculture still remains a major part of the local economy. In 2005 a total of 62% of all jobs in the municipality were in agriculture.

== Geography ==
Teuffenthal has an area of 4.53 km^{2} (1.75 sq mi). As of the 2004/06 survey, a total of 2.12 km^{2} (0.82 mi^{2}) or 46.8% is used for agricultural purposes, while 2.28 km^{2} (0.88 mi^{2}) or 50.3% is forested. Of rest of the municipality 0.14 km^{2} (35 acres) or 3.1% is settled (buildings or roads), 0.03 km^{2} (7.4 acres) or 0.7% is either rivers or lakes. Between the 1981 and 2004/06 surveys the settled area increased from 0.09 km^{2} (22 acres) to 0.14 km^{2} (35 acres), an increase of 55.56%.

From the same survey, housing and buildings made up 2.0% and transportation infrastructure made up 1.1%. A total of 48.6% of the total land area is heavily forested and 1.8% is covered with orchards or small clusters of trees. Of the agricultural land, 2.0% is used for growing crops and 38.2% is pasturage and 6.0% is used for alpine pastures. All the water in the municipality is flowing water.

It lies in the valley of the river Zulg on the north flank of Blueme mountain, some 10 km (6.2 mi) eastward of the district capital Thun. The municipality has no direct center, but consists of isolated hamlets and scattered farm settlements.

On 31 December 2009 Amtsbezirk Thun, the municipality's former district, was dissolved. On the following day, 1 January 2010, it joined the newly created Verwaltungskreis Thun.

== Coat of arms ==
The blazon of the municipal coat of arms is Or a Pall Gules.

== Demographics ==
Teuffenthal has a population (as of December 2020) of 160. As of 2012, 2.5% of the population are resident foreign nationals. Between the last 2 years (2010-2012) the population changed at a rate of -6.4%. Migration accounted for -6.4%, while births and deaths accounted for -0.6%. Most of the population (as of 2000) speaks German (190 or 96.4%) as their first language, Serbo-Croatian is the second most common (4 or 2.0%) and English is the third (2 or 1.0%).

As of 2008, the population was 48.8% male and 51.2% female. The population was made up of 82 Swiss men (47.7% of the population) and 2 (1.2%) non-Swiss men. There were 86 Swiss women (50.0%) and 2 (1.2%) non-Swiss women. Of the population in the municipality, 85 or about 43.1% were born in Teuffenthal and lived there in 2000. There were 89 or 45.2% who were born in the same canton, while 13 or 6.6% were born somewhere else in Switzerland, and 9 or 4.6% were born outside of Switzerland.

As of 2012, children and teenagers (0–19 years old) make up 23.0% of the population, while adults (20–64 years old) make up 56.5% and seniors (over 64 years old) make up 20.5%.

As of 2000, there were 84 people who were single and never married in the municipality. There were 99 married individuals, 8 widows or widowers and 6 individuals who are divorced.

As of 2010, there were 25 households that consist of only one person and 8 households with five or more people. In 2000, a total of 67 apartments (85.9% of the total) were permanently occupied, while 4 apartments (5.1%) were seasonally occupied and 7 apartments (9.0%) were empty. In 2012, single family homes made up 30.0% of the total housing in the municipality.

The historical population is given in the following chart:

== Economy ==
As of 2011, Teuffenthal had an unemployment rate of 0.61%. As of 2011, there were a total of 74 people employed in the municipality. Of these, there were 43 people employed in the primary economic sector and about 21 businesses involved in this sector. The secondary sector employs 8 people and there were 6 businesses in this sector. The tertiary sector employs 24 people, with 6 businesses in this sector. There were 94 residents of the municipality who were employed in some capacity, of which females made up 37.2% of the workforce.

In 2008 there were a total of 53 full-time equivalent jobs. The number of jobs in the primary sector was 26, all of which were in agriculture. The number of jobs in the secondary sector was 6 of which 4 or (66.7%) were in manufacturing and 2 (33.3%) were in construction. The number of jobs in the tertiary sector was 21. In the tertiary sector; 18 or 85.7% were in wholesale or retail sales or the repair of motor vehicles, 3 or 14.3% were in education.

In 2000, there were 20 workers who commuted into the municipality and 40 workers who commuted away. The municipality is a net exporter of workers, with about 2.0 workers leaving the municipality for every one entering. A total of 54 workers (73.0% of the 74 total workers in the municipality) both lived and worked in Teuffenthal. Of the working population, 3.2% used public transportation to get to work, and 41.5% used a private car.

The local and cantonal tax rate in Teuffenthal is one of the lowest in the canton. In 2012 the average local and cantonal tax rate on a married resident, with two children, of Teuffenthal making 150,000 CHF was 12.4%, while an unmarried resident's rate was 18.6%. For comparison, the average rate for the entire canton in 2011, was 14.2% and 22.0%, while the nationwide average was 12.3% and 21.1% respectively.

In 2010 there were a total of 58 tax payers in the municipality. Of that total, 15 made over 75,000 CHF per year. There was one person who made between 15,000 and 20,000 per year. The average income of the over 75,000 CHF group in Teuffenthal was 107,753 CHF, while the average across all of Switzerland was 131,244 CHF.

In 2011 a total of 3.7% of the population received direct financial assistance from the government.

== Politics ==
In the 2011 federal election the most popular party was the Swiss People's Party (SVP) which received 62.3% of the vote. The next three most popular parties were the Federal Democratic Union of Switzerland (EDU) (10.9%), the Social Democratic Party (SP) (7.3%) and the Conservative Democratic Party (BDP) (6.3%). In the federal election, a total of 85 votes were cast, and the voter turnout was 61.2%.

== Religion ==
From the 2000 census, 150 or 76.1% belonged to the Swiss Reformed Church, while 8 or 4.1% were Roman Catholic. Of the rest of the population, there were 17 individuals (or about 8.63% of the population) who belonged to another Christian church. There was 1 person who was Buddhist. 16 (or about 8.12% of the population) belonged to no church, are agnostic or atheist, and 5 individuals (or about 2.54% of the population) did not answer the question.

== Education ==
In Teuffenthal about 56.2% of the population have completed non-mandatory upper secondary education, and 8.6% have completed additional higher education (either university or a Fachhochschule). Of the 11 who had completed some form of tertiary schooling listed in the census, 81.8% were Swiss men, 18.2% were Swiss women.

As of 2000, there were a total of 36 students attending any school in the municipality. Of those, 30 both lived and attended school in the municipality, while 6 students came from another municipality. During the same year, 12 residents attended schools outside the municipality.
