= Oberhofen am Thunersee =

- Municipality
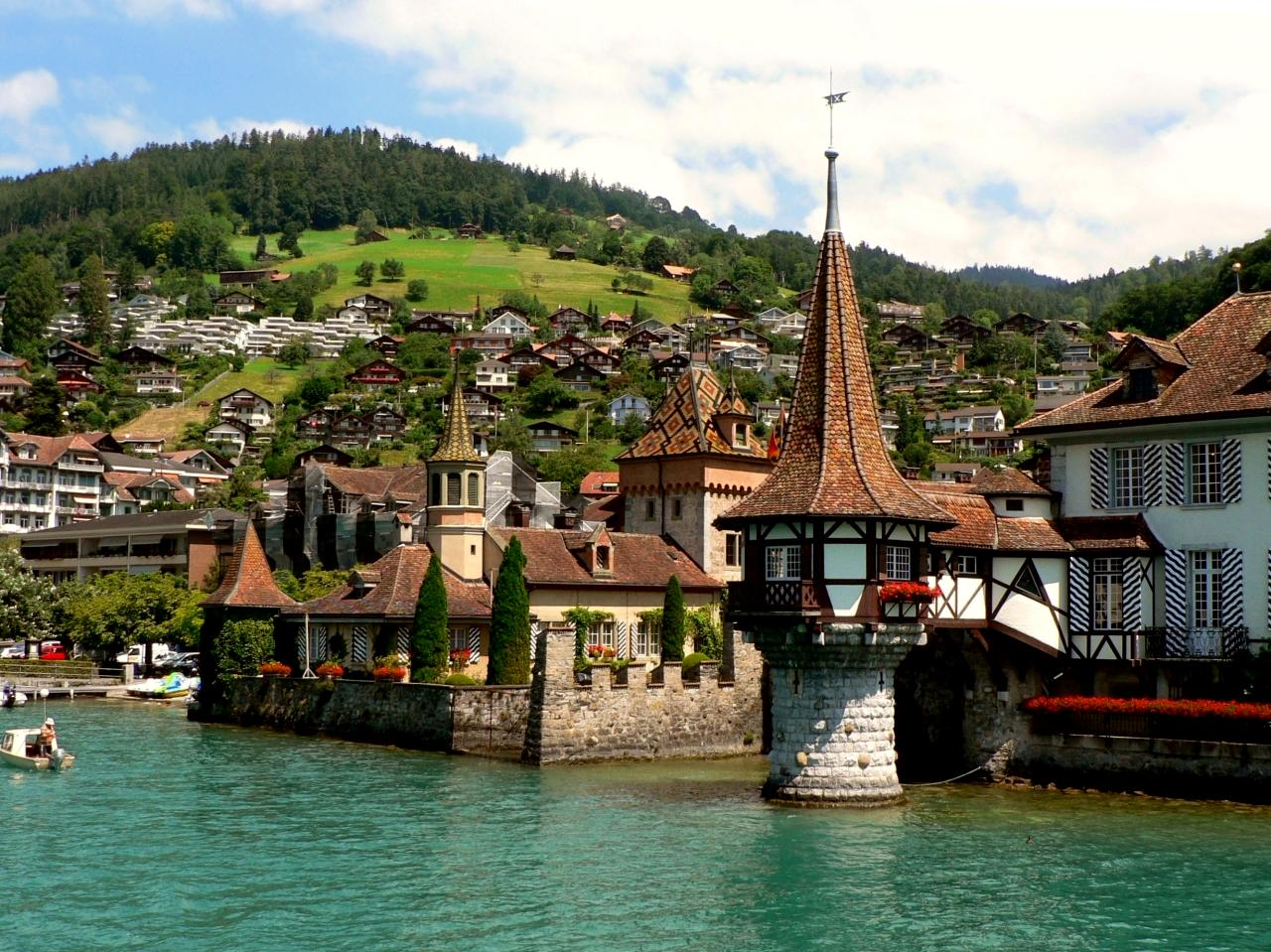
- Oberhofen Castle and lakefront

- Flag Coat of arms
- Location of Oberhofen am Thunersee
- Location within Switzerland Location within Canton of Bern
- Coordinates: 46°44′N 7°40′E
- Country: Switzerland
- Canton: Bern
- District: Thun

Government
  - Mayor: Sonja Reichen

Area
  - Total: 2.8 km^{2} (1.1 sq mi)
- Elevation: 585 m (1,919 ft)

Population (Dec 2012)
  - Total: 2,366
  - Density: 840/km^{2} (2,200/sq mi)
- Time zone: UTC+01:00 (CET)
  - Summer (DST): UTC+02:00 (CEST)
- Postal code: 3653
- SFOS number: 934
- ISO 3166 code: CH-BE
- Surrounded by: Heiligenschwendi, Hilterfingen, Sigriswil, Spiez
- Website: www.oberhofen.ch

Oberhofen am Thunersee is a municipality in the administrative district of Thun in the canton of Bern in Switzerland.

== History ==
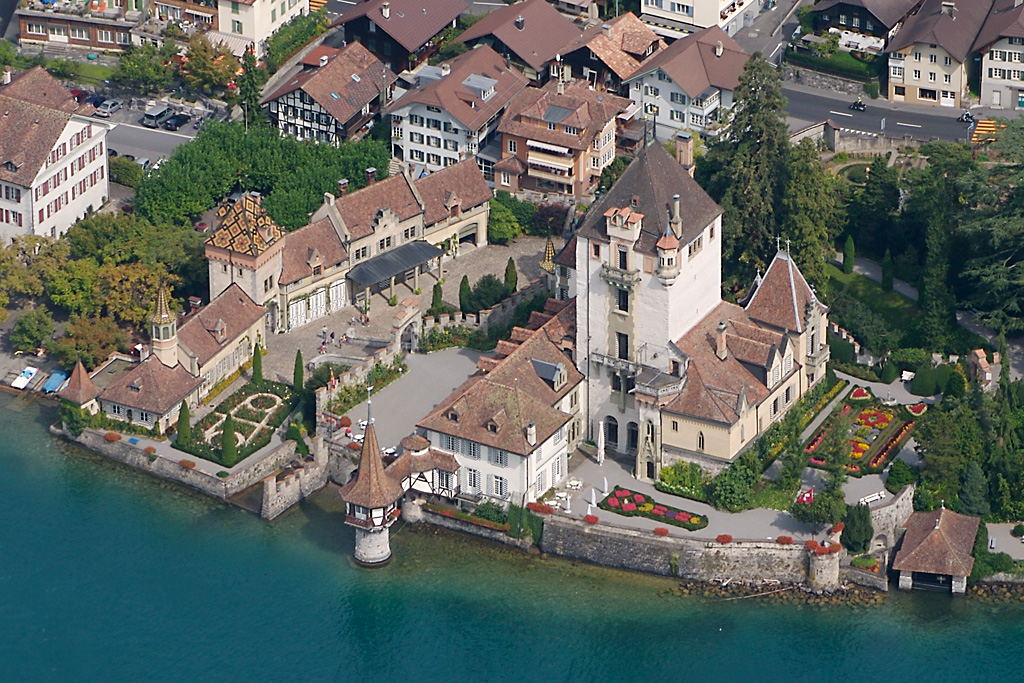
Aerial view of the castle

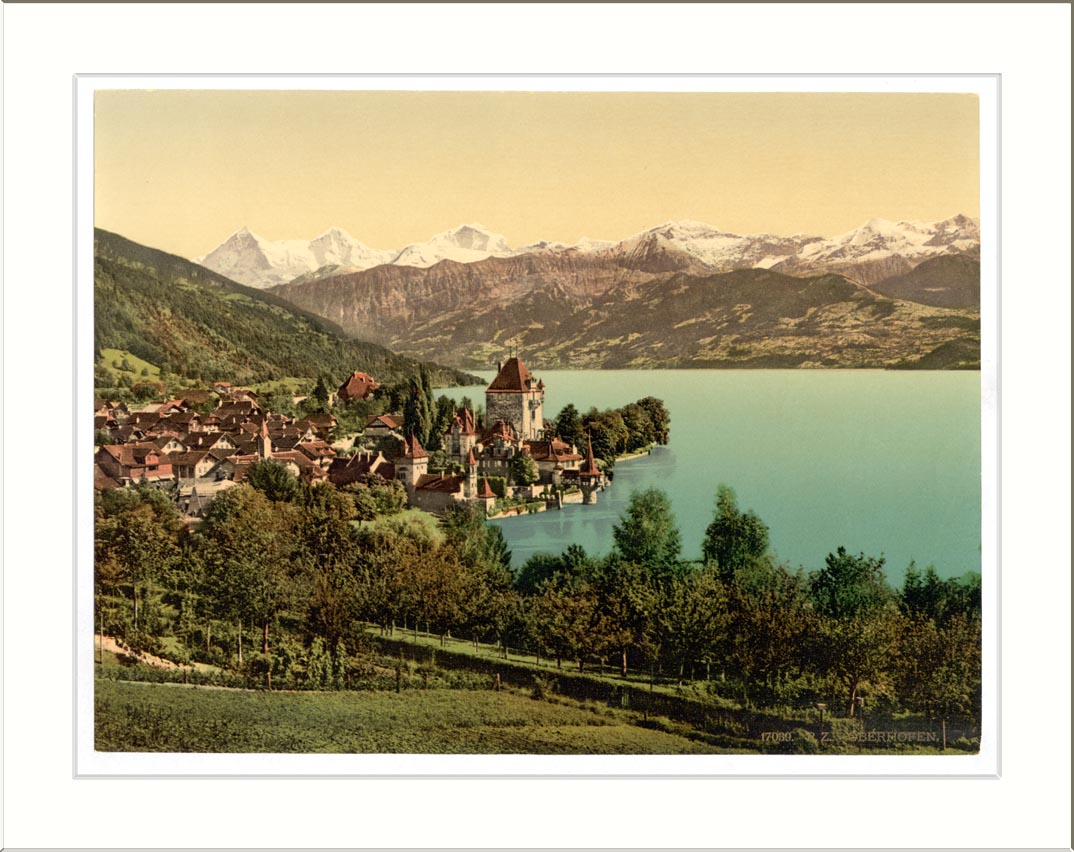
Oberhofen town between 1890 and 1900

Oberhofen during World War I

Aerial view from 150 m by Walter Mittelholzer (1925)

Oberhofen am Thunersee is first mentioned in 1133 as Obrenhoven.

The oldest trace of a settlement in the area are scattered Bronze Age artifacts which were discovered in the Längenschachen area. The area remained inhabited through the Early Middle Ages and into High Middle Ages, when the Freiherr von Oberhofen built a castle on a hill above the village. About 1130 the Freiherr founded Interlaken Monastery and donated part of his lands to the monastery. A few years later he donated another part of the village to the college of canons of Amsoldingen. In 1200, a daughter of the family, Ita, married into the von Eschenbach family and gave this family the castle and village. In the 13th century they began a new, moated castle on the shores of Lake Thun. In 1306 the von Eschenbach family was forced to sell Oberhofen and the castle to the Habsburgs. The Habsburgs appointed a succession of vassals to administer the area for them, especially the Kyburgs who also owned Thun Castle. Following the Kyburg defeat in the Burgdorferkrieg of 1383-84 and the decisive Habsburg defeat at the Battle of Sempach in 1386, Bern began to expand into the Austrian lands in the Bernese Oberland. They occupied Oberhofen in 1386 and were finally able to purchase or usurp all the land and rights from every feudal land holder in 1397. In the following year they sold the castle and Oberhofen Herrschaft to Ludwig von Seftigen, a citizen of Bern.

Over the following centuries the town, castle and herrschaft passed through several Bernese patrician families. After the male line of the von Erlach family in Oberhofen died out, Bern acquired the castle and lands. They created the bailiwick of Oberhofen and converted Oberhofen Castle into the administrative center for the bailiwick. Following the 1798 French invasion, Oberhofen am Thunersee became part of the Helvetic Republic Canton of Oberland. After the collapse of the Republic and 1803 Act of Mediation it joined the newly created Thun District.

Traditionally vineyards and wine production were an important part of the local economy and grapes appear on the municipal coat of arms. In the 19th century, the vineyards went into decline due to increased supply from other wine growing regions and problems with disease. In 1881 there were 18 hectares (44 acres) of vineyards, but by 1900 it was only 4 hectares (9.9 acres) and by 1911 there were no vineyards in the municipality. Decreasing viticulture and limited farm land led to constant emigration, generally to North America, throughout much of the 19th century. In 1936 a few small vineyards were replanted on the sunny terraces above Lake Thun. In 2008 there were a total of only 2.88 hectares (7.1 acres) under viticulture in the municipality.

In 1864 a fire destroyed part of the town, but opened up land for new developments. In the following decade the municipality grew into a health spa destination and in 1875 the Logierhaus Moy (Moy Hotel) opened. It was followed by several other hotels, resorts and spas over the following decades. The Seestrasse, a road along the lake, was completed in 1884 and helped bring tourists to the town. The Seestrasse was followed by the Steffisburg-Thun tram in 1913 which made visiting Oberhofen even easier. However, the outbreak of World War I devastated the tourist industry. In the interwar period, tourism returned slightly but not to the levels that it had seen before the war. A new dock was built in the lake for tour boats, but other new construction remained limited. Tourism slumped again with the outbreak of World War II and did not recover until 1950. Beginning in the 1950 many new vacation homes and a beach promenade were built to bring tourists back to the municipality. A regional indoor pool opened in Oberhofen in 1970. Today, a number of small businesses operate in the municipality, but about two-thirds of the labor force commutes to jobs in cities like Thun and Bern.

The castle passed into private hands after 1803 and had several owners in the following years. In 1849-52 the Pourtalès family renovated and expanded the castle to its present appearance. In 1940 the American William Maul Measy established the Oberhofen Castle foundation to administer and maintain the castle. In 1952 it became a part of the Historical Museum of Bern and two years later they opened a branch in the castle.

Oberhofen has always been a part of the parish of Hilterfingen and the parish church of St. Andrew is actually within the Oberhofen municipal borders. In 1834 Hilterfingen and Oberhofen separated into two independent citizen's communities but remained part of a common parish.

== Geography ==
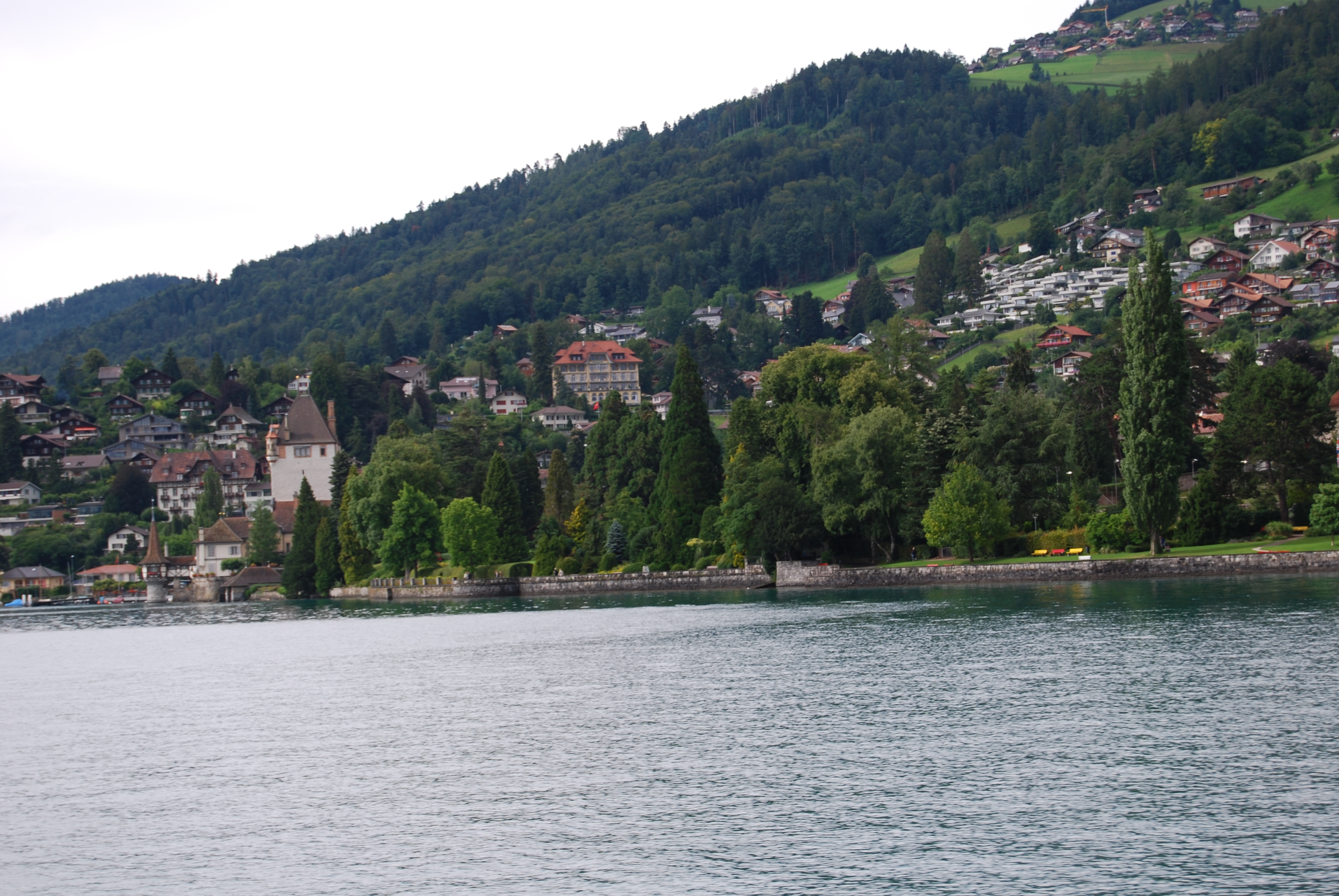
Oberhofen from Lake Thun

Oberhofen am Thunersee has an area of 2.71 km^{2} (1.05 sq mi). As of the 2004 survey, a total of 0.55 km^{2} (0.21 mi^{2}) or 20.2% is used for agricultural purposes, while 1.43 km^{2} (0.55 mi^{2}) or 52.6% is forested. Of rest of the municipality 0.76 km^{2} (0.29 mi^{2}) or 27.9% is settled (buildings or roads), 0.01 km^{2} (2.5 acres) or 0.4% is either rivers or lakes and 0.02 km^{2} (4.9 acres) or 0.7% is unproductive land.

From the same survey, housing and buildings made up 18.8% and transportation infrastructure made up 5.1%. Power and water infrastructure as well as other special developed areas made up 1.1% of the area while parks, green belts and sports fields made up 2.6%. A total of 51.1% of the total land area is heavily forested and 1.5% is covered with orchards or small clusters of trees. Of the agricultural land, 17.3% is pasturage, while 2.9% is used for orchards or vine crops. All the water in the municipality is in lakes.

It is located on the northern shore of Lake Thun (German: Thunersee) about 5 km (3.1 mi) from the city of Thun (which is located where the Aare river leaves the lake). Ecclesiastically the village has always been a section of the parish of Hilterfingen, the next village north along the lake (the village church of Hilterfingen is actually on ground that is a part of Oberhofen township). The neighboring village to the south-east is Gunten (part of the township of Sigriswil), while up the steep mountain to the north-east is the village of Heiligenschwendi (no road connection, only a footpath).

On 31 December 2009 Amtsbezirk Thun, the municipality's former district, was dissolved. On the following day, 1 January 2010, it joined the newly created Verwaltungskreis Thun.

== Coat of arms ==
The blazon of the municipal coat of arms is Per pale Gules and Argent overall a Vine tree growing from Coupeaux Vert on Prop Or with two grapes counterchanged.

== Demographics ==
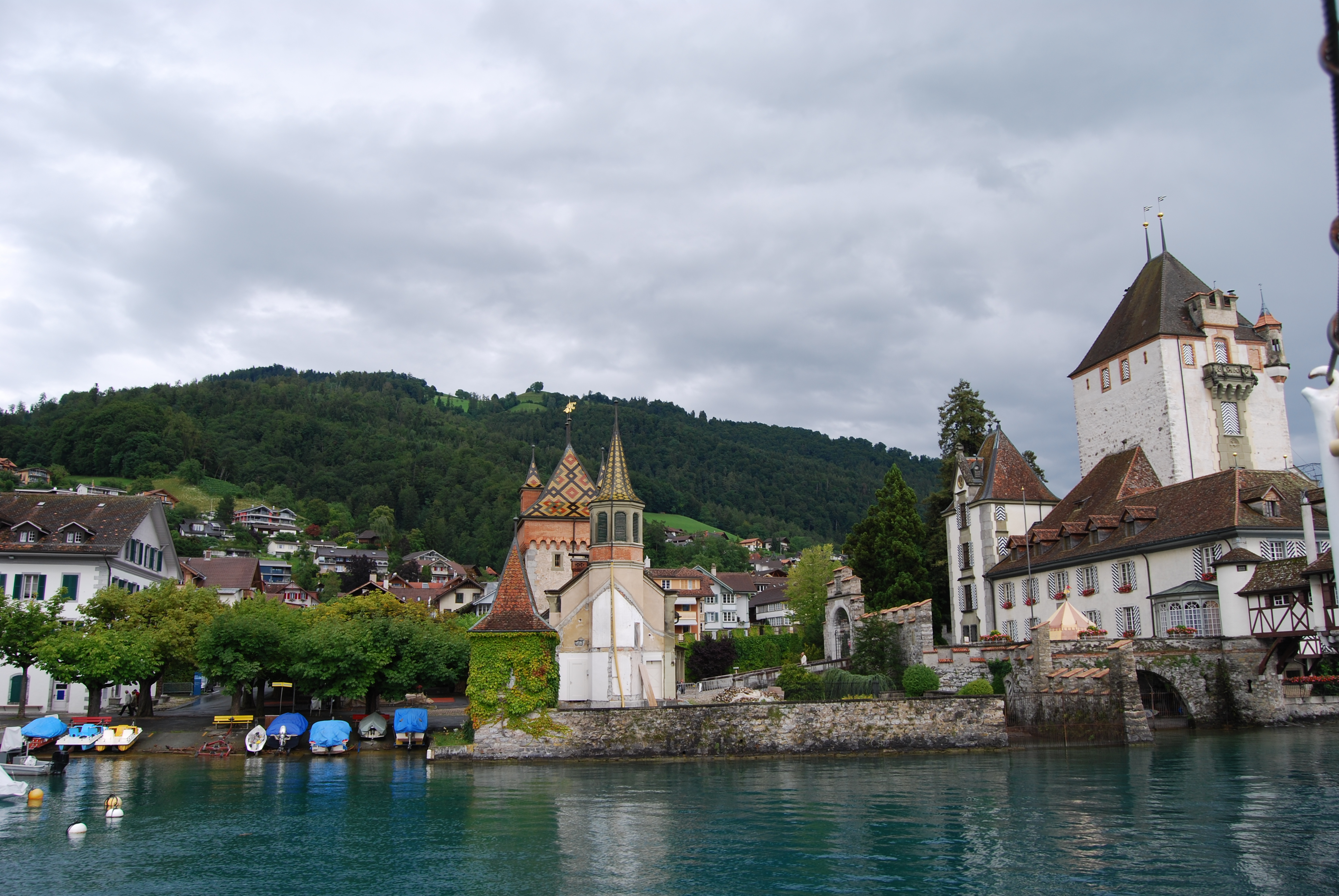
Oberhofen and Oberhofen Castle

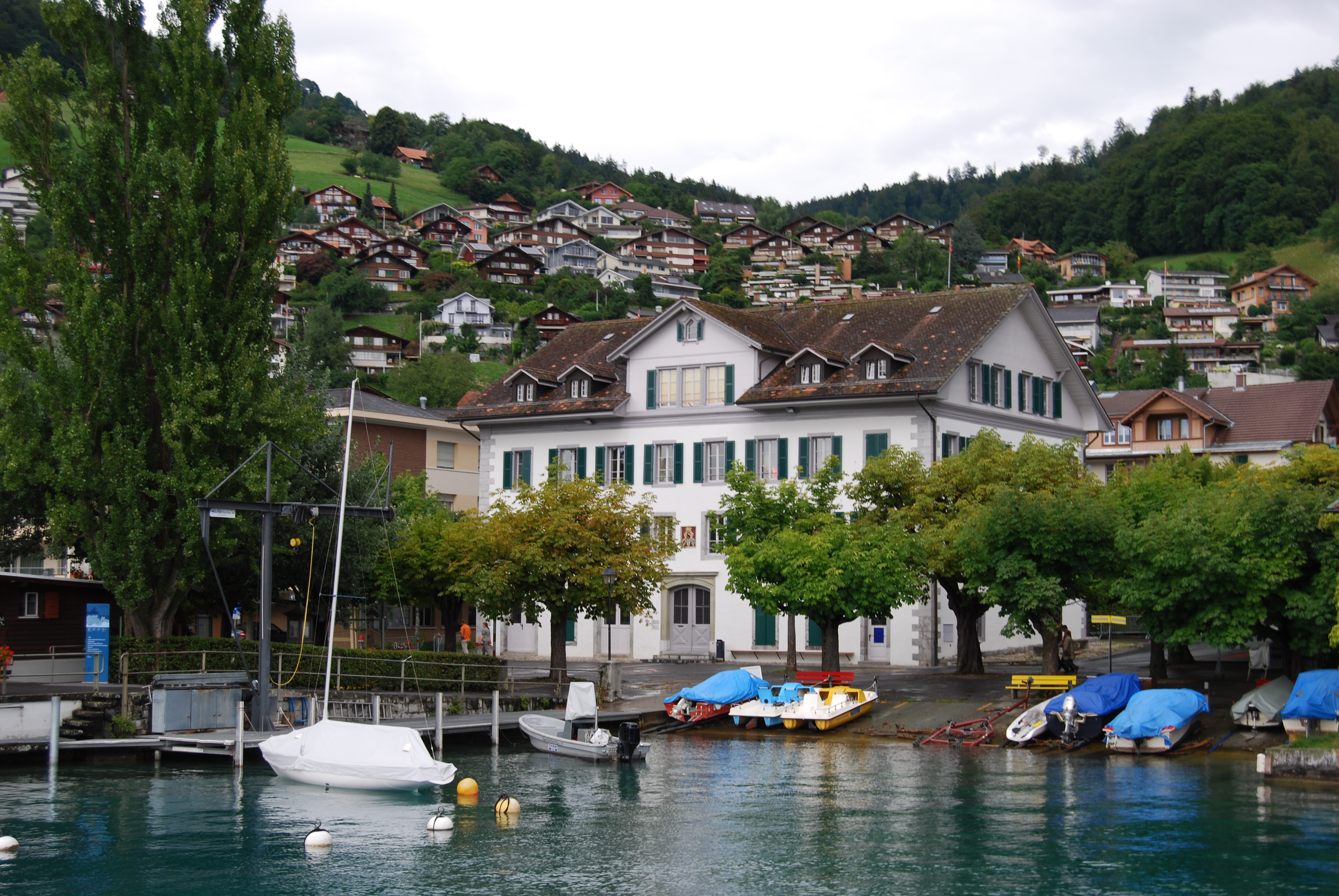
Oberhofen and the harbor

Oberhofen am Thunersee has a population (as of December 2020) of 2,445. As of 2012, 9.5% of the population are resident foreign nationals. Between the last 2 years (2010-2012) the population changed at a rate of 1.4%. Migration accounted for 2.2%, while births and deaths accounted for -0.7%.

Most of the population (as of 2000) speaks German (2,055 or 94.3%) as their first language, Albanian is the second most common (24 or 1.1%) and French is the third (20 or 0.9%). There are 7 people who speak Italian.

As of 2008, the population was 48.5% male and 51.5% female. The population was made up of 1,012 Swiss men (43.4% of the population) and 119 (5.1%) non-Swiss men. There were 1,107 Swiss women (47.4%) and 95 (4.1%) non-Swiss women. Of the population in the municipality, 442 or about 20.3% were born in Oberhofen am Thunersee and lived there in 2000. There were 999 or 45.8% who were born in the same canton, while 423 or 19.4% were born somewhere else in Switzerland, and 268 or 12.3% were born outside of Switzerland.

As of 2012, children and teenagers (0–19 years old) make up 16.3% of the population, while adults (20–64 years old) make up 55.1% and seniors (over 64 years old) make up 28.7%.

As of 2000, there were 742 people who were single and never married in the municipality. There were 1,086 married individuals, 193 widows or widowers and 158 individuals who are divorced.

As of 2010, there were 456 households that consist of only one person and 41 households with five or more people. In 2000, a total of 1,023 apartments (76.8% of the total) were permanently occupied, while 249 apartments (18.7%) were seasonally occupied and 60 apartments (4.5%) were empty. As of 2012, the construction rate of new housing units was 1.7 new units per 1000 residents. The vacancy rate for the municipality, in 2013, was 2.2%. In 2012, single family homes made up 47.1% of the total housing in the municipality.

The historical population is given in the following chart:

== Economy ==
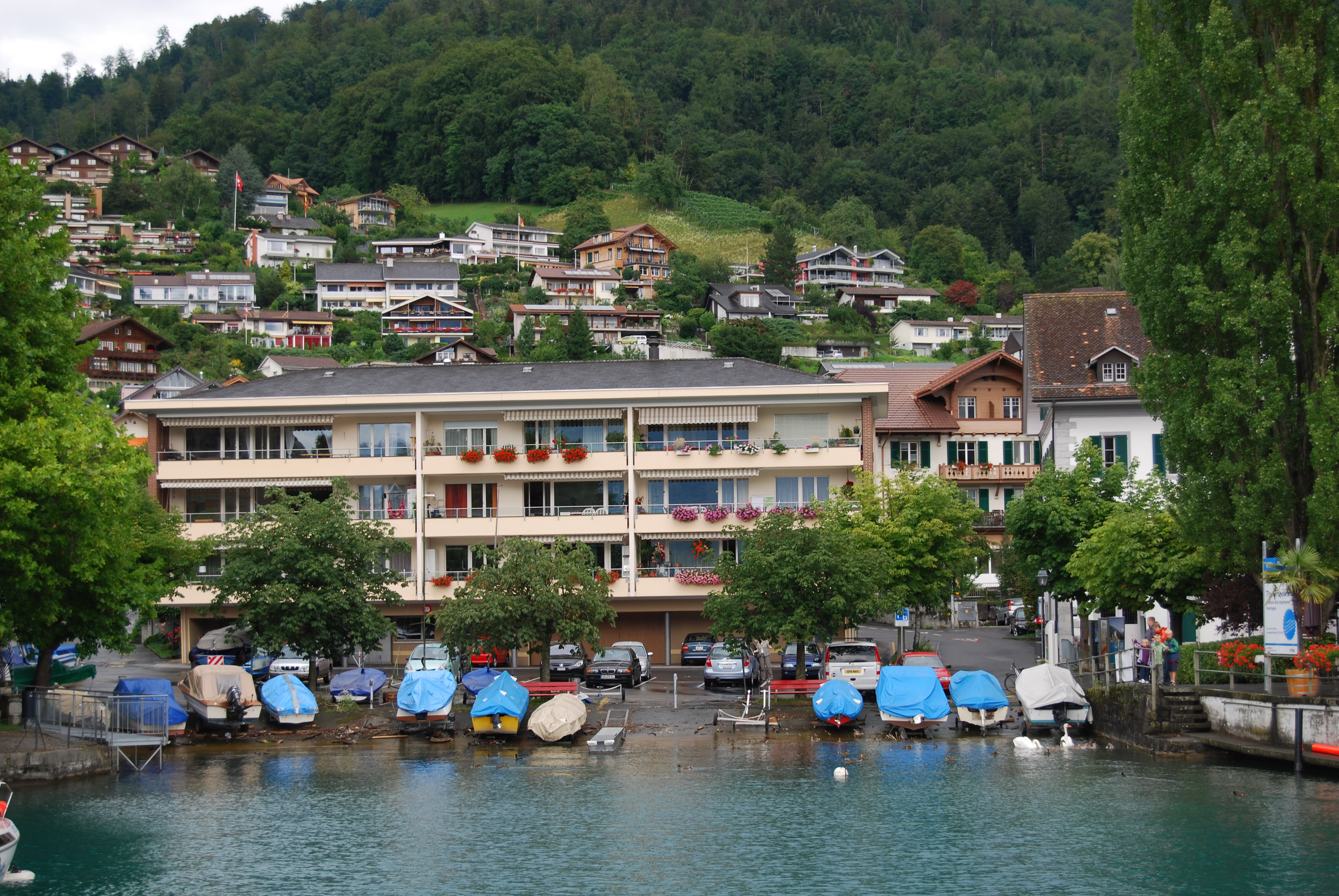
Harbor and houses in Oberhofen

As of 2011, Oberhofen am Thunersee had an unemployment rate of 1.88%. As of 2011, there were a total of 751 people employed in the municipality. Of these, there were 20 people employed in the primary economic sector and about 7 businesses involved in this sector. The secondary sector employs 93 people and there were 28 businesses in this sector. The tertiary sector employs 638 people, with 149 businesses in this sector. There were 1,107 residents of the municipality who were employed in some capacity, of which females made up 43.0% of the workforce.

In 2008 there were a total of 443 full-time equivalent jobs. The number of jobs in the primary sector was 14, of which 11 were in agriculture and 2 were in forestry or lumber production. The number of jobs in the secondary sector was 76 of which 14 or (18.4%) were in manufacturing and 61 (80.3%) were in construction. The number of jobs in the tertiary sector was 353. In the tertiary sector; 56 or 15.9% were in wholesale or retail sales or the repair of motor vehicles, 6 or 1.7% were in the movement and storage of goods, 74 or 21.0% were in a hotel or restaurant, 8 or 2.3% were in the information industry, 29 or 8.2% were technical professionals or scientists, 9 or 2.5% were in education and 79 or 22.4% were in health care.

In 2000, there were 305 workers who commuted into the municipality and 814 workers who commuted away. The municipality is a net exporter of workers, with about 2.7 workers leaving the municipality for every one entering. A total of 293 workers (49.0% of the 598 total workers in the municipality) both lived and worked in Oberhofen am Thunersee. Of the working population, 23.8% used public transportation to get to work, and 49.5% used a private car.

The local and cantonal tax rate in Oberhofen am Thunersee is one of the lowest in the canton. In 2012 the average local and cantonal tax rate on a married resident, with two children, of Oberhofen am Thunersee making 150,000 CHF was 11.9%, while an unmarried resident's rate was 17.8%. For comparison, the average rate for the entire canton in 2011, was 14.2% and 22.0%, while the nationwide average was 12.3% and 21.1% respectively.

In 2010 there were a total of 1,121 tax payers in the municipality. Of that total, 469 made over 75,000 CHF per year. There were 19 people who made between 15,000 and 20,000 per year. The average income of the over 75,000 CHF group in Oberhofen am Thunersee was 130,730 CHF, while the average across all of Switzerland was 131,244 CHF.

In 2011 a total of 2.0% of the population received direct financial assistance from the government.

== Heritage sites of national significance ==
Oberhofen Castle and the Wichterheer-Gut are listed as Swiss heritage site of national significance. The entire urbanized village of Oberhofen am Thunersee is part of the Inventory of Swiss Heritage Sites.

The dominant feature of the village is the lakeside castle of Oberhofen, dating to the Middle Ages, but constantly changed and updated throughout the ages. The castle houses a division of the Historic Museum of Bern, and has a formal lakeside garden in the English style with many rare specimen trees.

The Wichterheer estate, lakeside to the south of the castle, houses the Museum für Uhren und Mechanische Musik (Museum of Timekeeping and Mechanical Music) as well as an exhibit of 20th century local art.

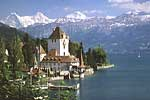
Oberhofen Castle

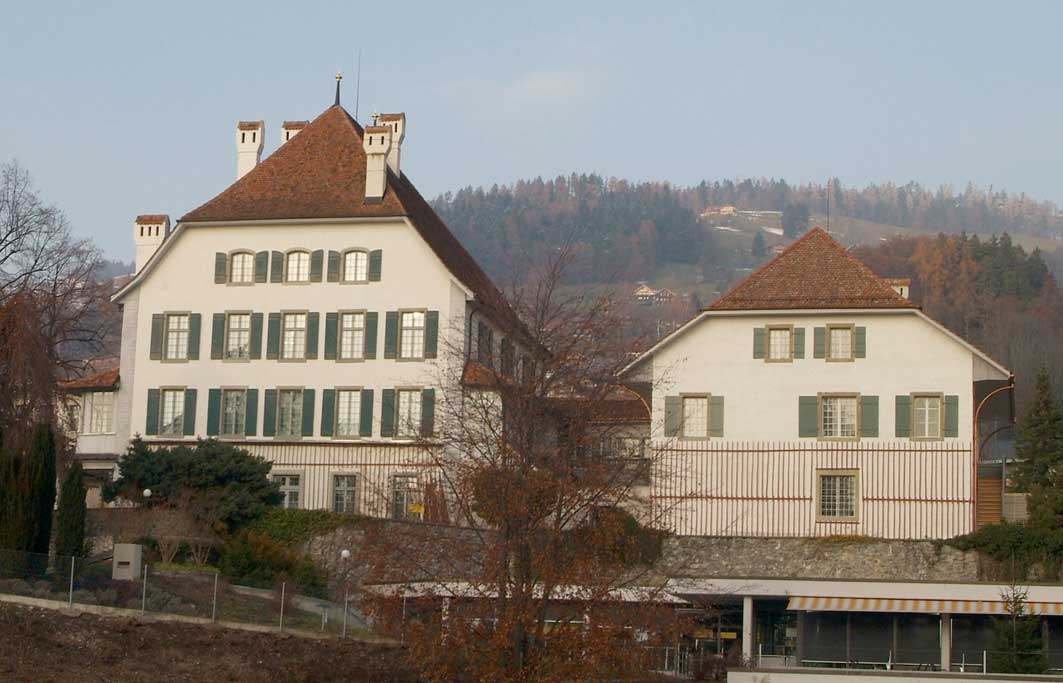
Wichterheer estate

== Politics ==
In the 2011 federal election the most popular party was the Swiss People's Party (SVP) which received 27.6% of the vote. The next three most popular parties were the Liberals (FDP) (16.8%), the Conservative Democratic Party (BDP) (16.8%) and the Social Democratic Party (SP) (13.8%). In the federal election, a total of 1,181 votes were cast, and the voter turnout was 64.2%.

== Religion ==
From the 2000 census, 1,535 or 70.4% belonged to the Swiss Reformed Church, while 243 or 11.2% were Roman Catholic. Of the rest of the population, there were 6 members of an Orthodox church (or about 0.28% of the population), there were 7 individuals (or about 0.32% of the population) who belonged to the Christian Catholic Church, and there were 41 individuals (or about 1.88% of the population) who belonged to another Christian church. There were 58 (or about 2.66% of the population) who were Muslim. There were 2 individuals who were Buddhist and 2 individuals who were Hindu. 227 (or about 10.42% of the population) belonged to no church, are agnostic or atheist, and 58 individuals (or about 2.66% of the population) did not answer the question.

== Education ==
In Oberhofen am Thunersee about 58% of the population have completed non-mandatory upper secondary education, and 28.7% have completed additional higher education (either university or a Fachhochschule). Of the 452 who had completed some form of tertiary schooling listed in the census, 68.6% were Swiss men, 22.1% were Swiss women, 5.3% were non-Swiss men and 4.0% were non-Swiss women.

The Canton of Bern school system provides one year of non-obligatory Kindergarten, followed by six years of Primary school. This is followed by three years of obligatory lower Secondary school where the students are separated according to ability and aptitude. Following the lower Secondary students may attend additional schooling or they may enter an apprenticeship.

During the 2012-13 school year, there were a total of 243 students attending classes in Oberhofen am Thunersee. There were a total of 36 students in the German language kindergarten classes in the municipality. Of the kindergarten students, 2.8% were permanent or temporary residents of Switzerland (not citizens) and 5.6% have a different mother language than the classroom language. The municipality's primary school had 207 students in German language classes. Of the primary students, 9.2% were permanent or temporary residents of Switzerland (not citizens) and 12.1% have a different mother language than the classroom language.

As of 2000, there were a total of 191 students attending any school in the municipality. Of those, 110 both lived and attended school in the municipality, while 81 students came from another municipality. During the same year, 100 residents attended schools outside the municipality.
