= Hünegg Castle =

Castle in Hilterfingen, Switzerland

- Schloss Hünegg
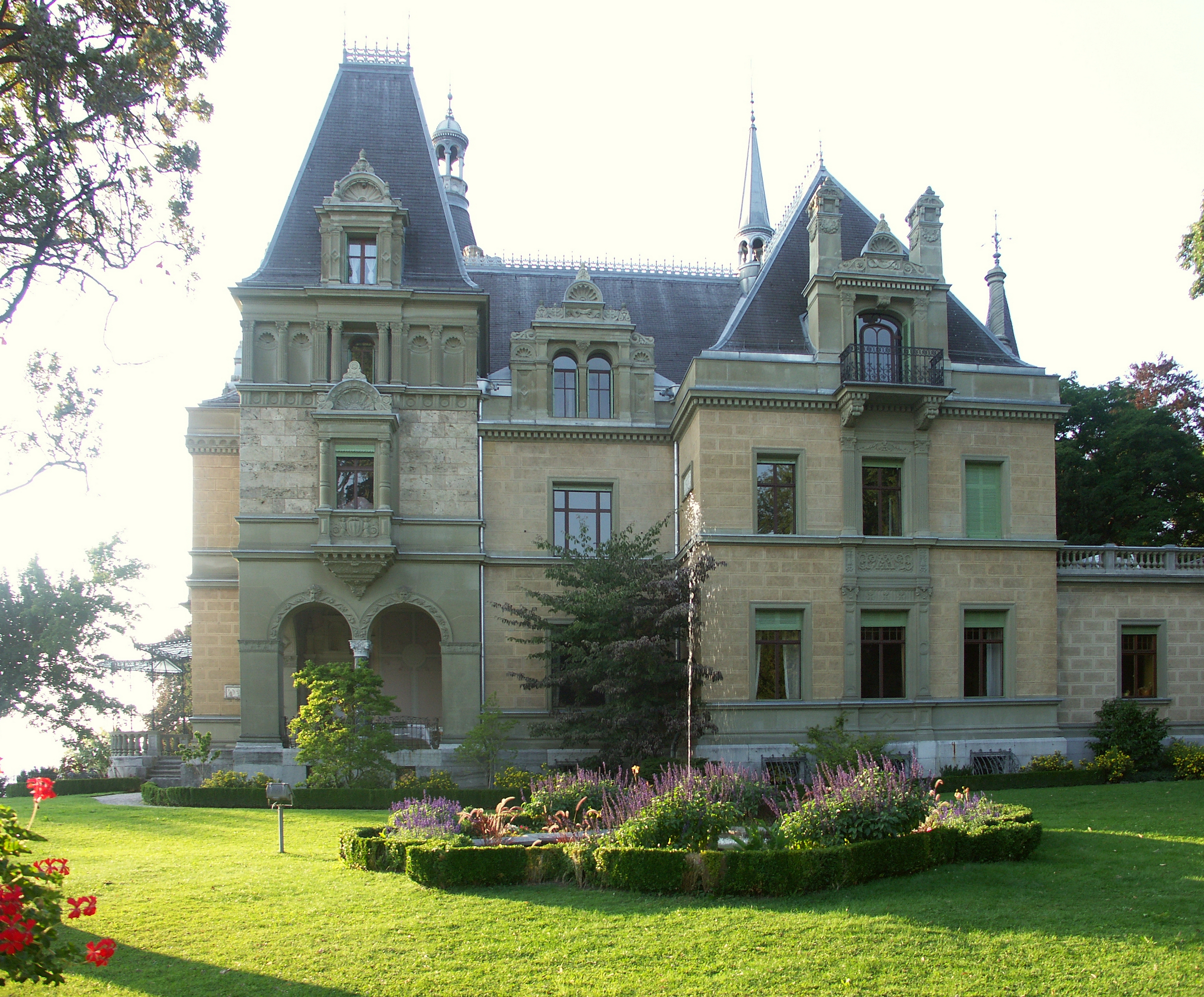

- Location within Switzerland

General information
- Location: Hilterfingen
- Coordinates: 46.737794°N 7.654931°E
- Completed: 1863

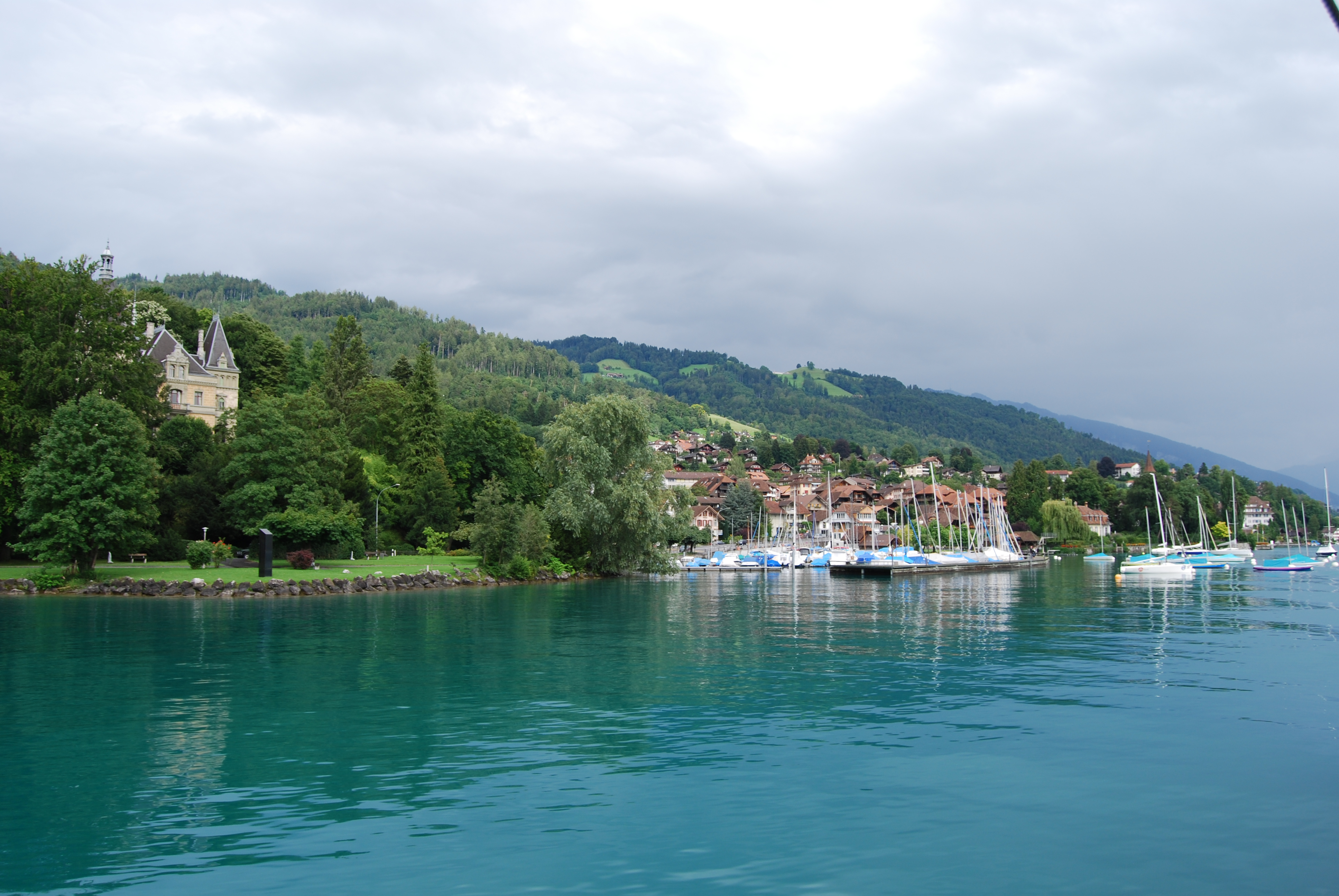
Hünegg Castle above Lake Thun.

Hünegg Castle (German: Schloss Hünegg) is a castle in the municipality of Hilterfingen of the Canton of Bern in Switzerland. It is a Swiss heritage site of national significance.

== History ==
Hünegg Castle was built between 1861 and 1863 for the Prussian Baron Albert Emil Otto von Parpart by Heino Schmieden. He, however, was only able to enjoy the castle for a few years before his death in 1869. By 1883, the estate had passed to his nephew, who sold off the art collection and then in 1893 sold the castle to the Berlin commercial judge Karl Lehmann. (Note: Swisscastles.ch has the date sold to Lehmann as 1873, but the municipal website says 1893. Every source agrees on 6 years between Lehmann and Lemke and the municipal website indicates that Lemke bought it in 1899 while the museum site says renovations began in 1900. This makes the 1873 date appear incorrect.) He owned the property for only six years before it was acquired by Gustav Lemke-Schuckert, an architect from Wiesbaden, who renovated the interior in the Art Nouveau style. At about the beginning of the Second World War, the castle was sold to Oscar Haag from Küsnacht, who in 1958 sold it to the Canton of Bern. Today it houses the Renaissance Revival and Art Nouveau Museum.

The interior has been meticulously preserved or recreated to give the impression that the 19th century owners have just left.

== Special exhibitions ==
The castle and its park are available for hire for temporary exhibitions. As an example, a Mountain railways special exhibition took place in 2012, 2013, and 2014, from May to October.

=== Mountain railways special exhibition ===
The Swiss Mountain Railways Special Exhibition was mounted between May and October 2012, and again between May and October 2013. It was scheduled to return again in 2014.

Mounted by Robert Ganz and Roger Rieker, the special exhibitions were about the early pioneer work of the Swiss mountain railways, with a budget of 95,000 Swiss Francs, the exhibition included loaned objects from 130 individuals and 30 companies, to provide visitors with an overview of rack- and adhesion railways, funicular railways, aerial cableways, ski lifts, and other mountain transportation mechanisms. The loaned objects included several original objects, approximately 200 featured detailed model reproductions, over 500 photographs, over 100 documents, and ten video presentations.

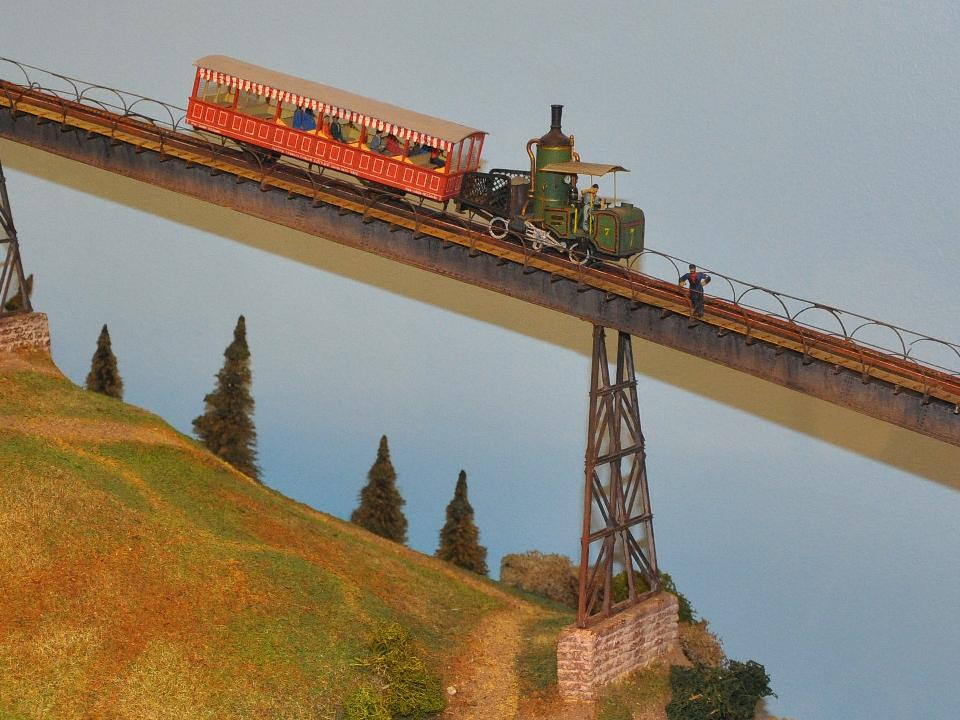
Diorama show the first rack railway in Europe the Viznau-Rigi railway (RB)

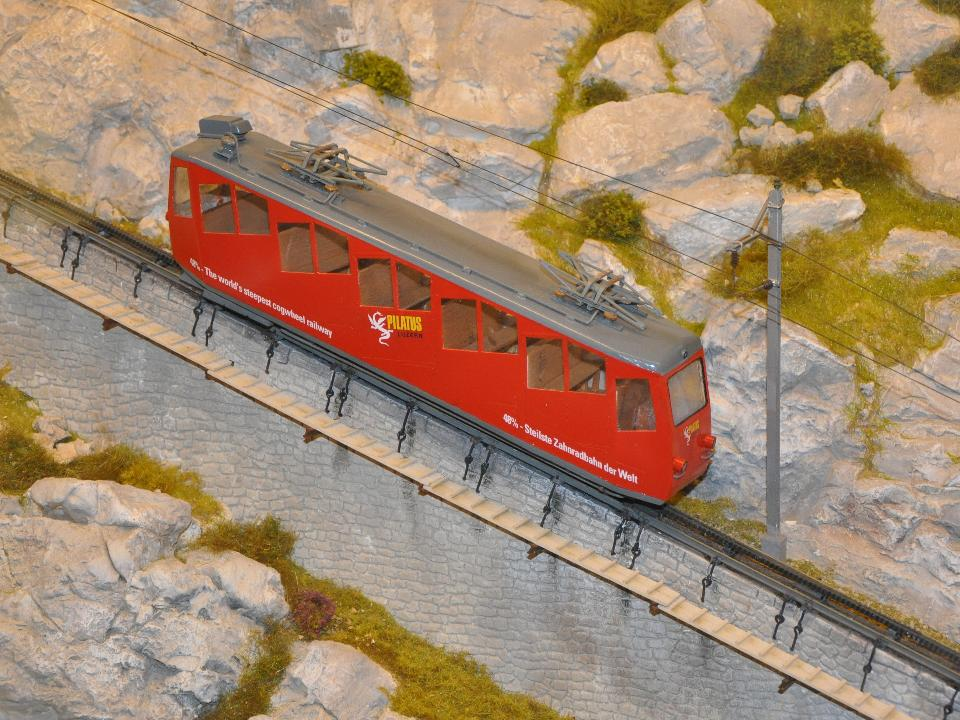
Diorama show the steepest rack railway in the world the Pilatus railway (PB)

== Bibliography ==
- Robert Ganz, Roger Rieker: Bau und Betrieb Schweizerischer Bergbahnen, Historischer Querschnitt, Sonderausstellung im Schloss Hünegg Hilterfingen, authors publisher, Jost Druck Hünibach 2013
