= Heiligenschwendi =

- Municipality
- Flag Coat of arms
- Location of Heiligenschwendi
- Location within Switzerland Location within Canton of Bern
- Coordinates: 46°44′N 7°41′E
- Country: Switzerland
- Canton: Bern
- District: Thun

Government
  - Mayor: Christian Zwahlen

Area
  - Total: 6.57 km^{2} (2.54 sq mi)
- Elevation: 1,123 m (3,684 ft)

Population (Dec 2012)
  - Total: 681
  - Density: 104/km^{2} (268/sq mi)
- Time zone: UTC+01:00 (CET)
  - Summer (DST): UTC+02:00 (CEST)
- Postal code: 3625
- SFOS number: 927
- ISO 3166 code: CH-BE
- Surrounded by: Hilterfingen, Homberg, Oberhofen am Thunersee, Sigriswil, Teuffenthal, Thun
- Website: www.heiligenschwendi.ch

Heiligenschwendi is a municipality in the administrative district of Thun in the canton of Bern in Switzerland.

== History ==
Heiligenschwendi is first mentioned in 1285 as Helgeswendi.

Originally the municipality was part of the lands of the Kyburg. After a failed raid on Solothurn on 11 November 1382 and the resulting Burgdorferkrieg, the Kyburgs lost most of their lands to Bern in 1384. Under Bernese rule it became part of the court of Steffisburg in the Thun District. Under both Kyburg and Bernese rule it was part of the parish of Hilterfingen.

Originally it was made up of three village; Heiligenschwendi, Schwendihaus and Hünibach. By 1782 Heiligenschwendi had a population of 109, Schwendihaus had 79 and Hünibach had 84. Heiligenschwendi and Schwendihaus shared a school house between the two communities and gradually drew closer together. In contrast, Hünibach had its own school and was slowly moving away from the other two. When the political municipality of Heiligenschwendi was formed it included all three communities but separate Burgergemeinden. In 1884 the Seestrasse (Lake road) opened, connecting Hünibach and the rest of Heiligenschwendi with Thun. When a station on the Steffisburg-Interlaken tram opened in Hünibach in 1913, the community became increasingly attractive to commuters. All three communities grew, but Hünibach grew disproportionately. In 1950, Hünibach had a population of 369 and was politically much closer to Hilterfingen than the rest of Heiligenschwendi. After prolonged negotiations, in 1958, it left Heiligenschwendi and joined Hilterfingen.

A simultaneum chapel was built in 1925 near the Heiligenschwendi school house. It held services for both the Swiss Reformed Church and the local Methodist congregation. A cemetery was added four year later.

Aerial view of the tuberculosis clinic (1952)

A tuberculosis clinic opened in the municipality in 1895. In 1912 the original clinic expanded as more patients came to Heiligenschwendi. Beginning in 1902 the first of several hotels, restaurants and rental homes opened for visitors to the clinic or nearby Lake Thun and mountains. A hydroelectric dam provided electricity to the villages beginning in 1904. Tours of the lake began stopping at Heiligenschwendi in 1919. Beginning in the 1920s and into the 1930s better sanitation and public education led to declining tuberculosis rates, which damaged the local economy. A tourist office opened in 1933 and helped bring tourists back to the municipality and today there are four hotels in the community. The clinic gradually shifted from treating tuberculosis and by 1960 it was an asthma clinic. It became a rehabilitation center for heart disease and asthma and moved to new buildings in 1976. A treatment center for young drug addicts opened in 1981 in the Sonnegg area of the municipality.

== Geography ==
Heiligenschwendi has an area of 5.55 km^{2} (2.14 sq mi). As of 2012, a total of 2.71 km^{2} (1.05 mi^{2}) or 48.8% is used for agricultural purposes, while 2.42 km^{2} (0.93 mi^{2}) or 43.6% is forested. The rest of the municipality is 0.41 km^{2} (0.16 mi^{2}) or 7.4% is settled (buildings or roads), 0.01 km^{2} (2.5 acres) or 0.2% is either rivers or lakes and 0.02 km^{2} (4.9 acres) or 0.4% is unproductive land.

During the same year, housing and buildings made up 5.6% and transportation infrastructure made up 1.4%. A total of 42.2% of the total land area is heavily forested and 1.4% is covered with orchards or small clusters of trees. Of the agricultural land, 3.4% is used for growing crops and 43.8% is pasturage, while 1.6% is used for orchards or vine crops. All the water in the municipality is flowing water.

The municipality is located on a terrace, about 900–1,125 meters (2,953–3,691 ft) above the right shore of Lake Thun. It includes the small village of Heiligneschwendi and the village of Schwendi with its hospital and a number of scattered farm houses.

On 31 December 2009 Amtsbezirk Thun, the municipality's former district, was dissolved. On the following day, 1 January 2010, it joined the newly created Verwaltungskreis Thun.

== Coat of arms ==
The blazon of the municipal coat of arms is Azure a Sun in splendour Or on a Mount of 3 Couepaux of the same.

== Demographics ==
Heiligenschwendi has a population (as of December 2020) of 725. As of 2012, 9.4% of the population are resident foreign nationals. Between the last 2 years (2010-2012) the population changed at a rate of 2.3%. Migration accounted for 1.7%, while births and deaths accounted for 0.0%.

Most of the population (as of 2000) speaks German (640 or 90.5%) as their first language, Serbo-Croatian is the second most common (15 or 2.1%) and Italian is the third (10 or 1.4%). There are 4 people who speak French and 1 person who speaks Romansh.

As of 2008, the population was 49.2% male and 50.8% female. The population was made up of 286 Swiss men (42.9% of the population) and 42 (6.3%) non-Swiss men. There were 305 Swiss women (45.8%) and 33 (5.0%) non-Swiss women. Of the population in the municipality, 192 or about 27.2% were born in Heiligenschwendi and lived there in 2000. There were 267 or 37.8% who were born in the same canton, while 122 or 17.3% were born somewhere else in Switzerland, and 116 or 16.4% were born outside of Switzerland.

As of 2012, children and teenagers (0–19 years old) make up 18.5% of the population, while adults (20–64 years old) make up 57.9% and seniors (over 64 years old) make up 23.6%.

As of 2000, there were 277 people who were single and never married in the municipality. There were 360 married individuals, 48 widows or widowers and 22 individuals who are divorced.

As of 2010, there were 123 households that consist of only one person and 17 households with five or more people. In 2000, a total of 290 apartments (71.8% of the total) were permanently occupied, while 98 apartments (24.3%) were seasonally occupied and 16 apartments (4.0%) were empty. As of 2012, the construction rate of new housing units was 5.9 new units per 1000 residents. The vacancy rate for the municipality, in 2013, was 0.8%. In 2012, single family homes made up 35.0% of the total housing in the municipality.

The historical population is given in the following chart:

== Economy ==
As of 2011, Heiligenschwendi had an unemployment rate of 1.41%. As of 2011, there were a total of 509 people employed in the municipality. Of these, there were 50 people employed in the primary economic sector and about 20 businesses involved in this sector. The secondary sector employs 20 people and there were 9 businesses in this sector. The tertiary sector employs 439 people, with 36 businesses in this sector. There were 357 residents of the municipality who were employed in some capacity, of which females made up 46.2% of the workforce.

In 2008 there were a total of 369 full-time equivalent jobs. The number of jobs in the primary sector was 29, all of which were in agriculture. The number of jobs in the secondary sector was 15 of which 4 or (26.7%) were in manufacturing and 11 (73.3%) were in construction. The number of jobs in the tertiary sector was 325. In the tertiary sector; 4 or 1.2% were in wholesale or retail sales or the repair of motor vehicles, 6 or 1.8% were in the movement and storage of goods, 10 or 3.1% were in a hotel or restaurant, 4 or 1.2% were technical professionals or scientists, and 297 or 91.4% were in health care.

In 2000, there were 202 workers who commuted into the municipality and 165 workers who commuted away. The municipality is a net importer of workers, with about 1.2 workers entering the municipality for every one leaving. A total of 192 workers (48.7% of the 394 total workers in the municipality) both lived and worked in Heiligenschwendi. Of the working population, 10.9% used public transportation to get to work, and 43.1% used a private car.

The local and cantonal tax rate in Heiligenschwendi is one of the lowest in the canton. In 2012 the average local and cantonal tax rate on a married resident, with two children, of Heiligenschwendi making 150,000 CHF was 12.5%, while an unmarried resident's rate was 18.7%. For comparison, the average rate for the entire canton in 2011, was 14.2% and 22.0%, while the nationwide average was 12.3% and 21.1% respectively.

In 2010 there were a total of 279 tax payers in the municipality. Of that total, 78 made over 75,000 CHF per year. There were 5 people who made between 15,000 and 20,000 per year. The greatest number of workers, 83, made between 50,000 and 75,000 CHF per year. The average income of the over 75,000 CHF group in Heiligenschwendi was 102,153 CHF, while the average across all of Switzerland was 131,244 CHF.

In 2011 a total of 0.9% of the population received direct financial assistance from the government.

== Politics ==
In the 2011 federal election the most popular party was the Swiss People's Party (SVP) which received 40.3% of the vote. The next three most popular parties were the Social Democratic Party (SP) (15.3%), the Conservative Democratic Party (BDP) (12.3%) and the Evangelical People's Party (EVP) (6.9%). In the federal election, a total of 313 votes were cast, and the voter turnout was 60.4%.

== Religion ==
From the 2000 census, 426 or 60.3% belonged to the Swiss Reformed Church, while 66 or 9.3% were Roman Catholic. Of the rest of the population, there were 18 members of an Orthodox church (or about 2.55% of the population), there was 1 individual who belongs to the Christian Catholic Church, and there were 65 individuals (or about 9.19% of the population) who belonged to another Christian church. There were 2 individuals (or about 0.28% of the population) who were Jewish, and 7 (or about 0.99% of the population) who were Muslim. There were 6 individuals who were Hindu and 1 individual who belonged to another church. 100 (or about 14.14% of the population) belonged to no church, are agnostic or atheist, and 15 individuals (or about 2.12% of the population) did not answer the question.

== Education ==
In Heiligenschwendi about 50.9% of the population have completed non-mandatory upper secondary education, and 22% have completed additional higher education (either university or a Fachhochschule). Of the 99 who had completed some form of tertiary schooling listed in the census, 55.6% were Swiss men, 26.3% were Swiss women, 10.1% were non-Swiss men and 8.1% were non-Swiss women.

The Canton of Bern school system provides one year of non-obligatory Kindergarten, followed by six years of Primary school. This is followed by three years of obligatory lower Secondary school where the students are separated according to ability and aptitude. Following the lower Secondary students may attend additional schooling or they may enter an apprenticeship.

During the 2012-13 school year, there were a total of 56 students attending classes in Heiligenschwendi. There were a total of 12 students in the German language kindergarten classes in the municipality. Of the kindergarten students, 8.3% have a different mother language than the classroom language. The municipality's primary school had 32 students in German language classes. Of the primary students, 3.1% were permanent or temporary residents of Switzerland (not citizens) and 6.3% have a different mother language than the classroom language. During the same year, the lower secondary schools in neighboring municipalities had a total of 12 students from Heiligenschwendi.

As of 2000, there were a total of 47 students attending any school in the municipality. Of those, 46 both lived and attended school in the municipality, while one student came from another municipality. During the same year, 37 residents attended schools outside the municipality.
