= Hilterfingen =

- Municipality
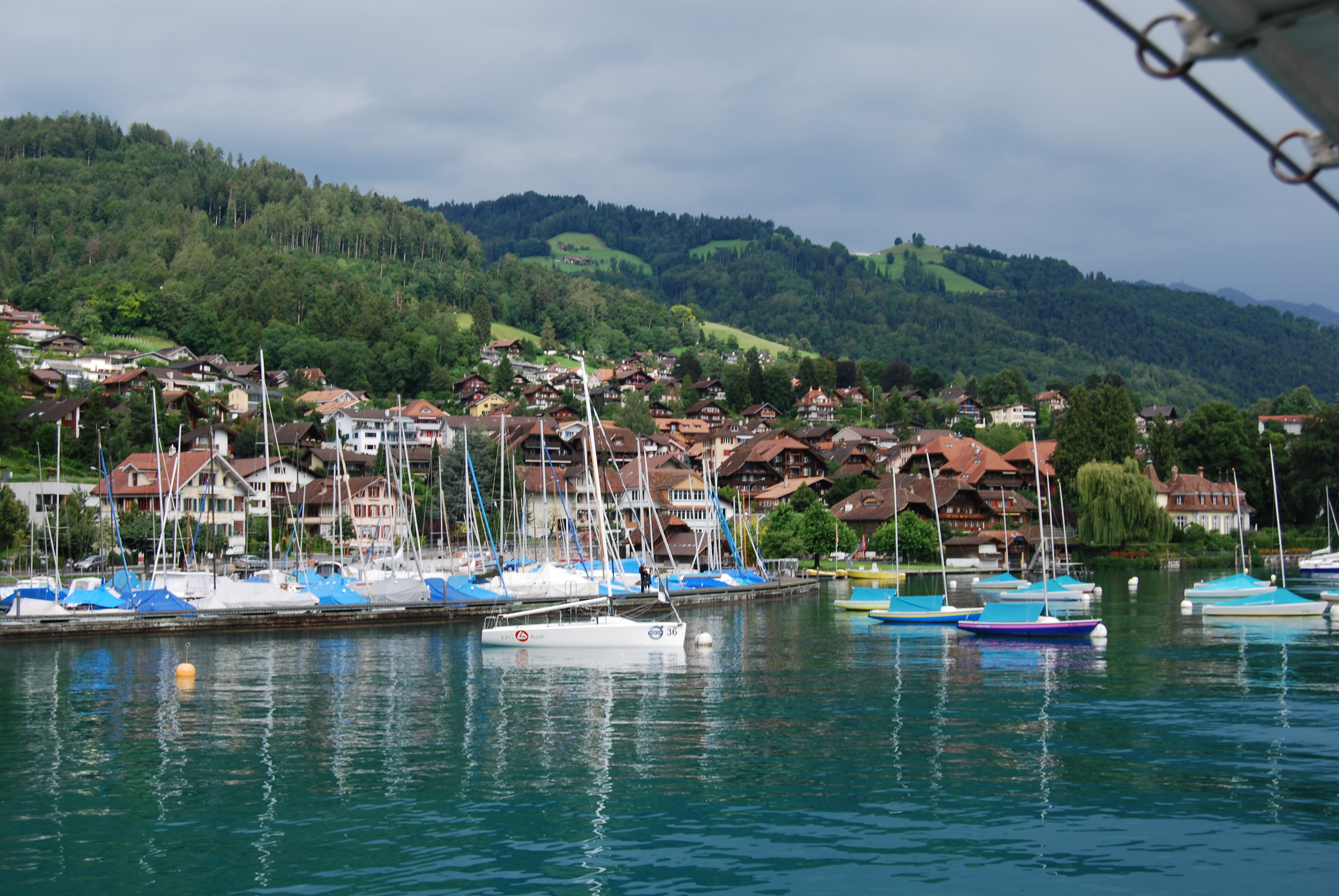
- Harbor and Hilterfingen village

- Flag Coat of arms
- Location of Hilterfingen
- Location within Switzerland Location within Canton of Bern
- Coordinates: 46°44′N 7°39′E
- Country: Switzerland
- Canton: Bern
- District: Thun

Government
  - Mayor: Gerhard Beindorff

Area
  - Total: 2.80 km^{2} (1.08 sq mi)
- Elevation: 562 m (1,844 ft)

Population (Dec 2012)
  - Total: 4,061
  - Density: 1,450/km^{2} (3,760/sq mi)
- Time zone: UTC+01:00 (CET)
  - Summer (DST): UTC+02:00 (CEST)
- Postal code: 3652
- SFOS number: 929
- ISO 3166 code: CH-BE
- Surrounded by: Heiligenschwendi, Oberhofen am Thunersee, Spiez, Thun
- Website: www.hilterfingen.ch

Hilterfingen (German pronunciation: [ˈhɪltɐˌfɪŋən]) is a municipality in the administrative district of Thun in the canton of Bern in Switzerland.

== History ==
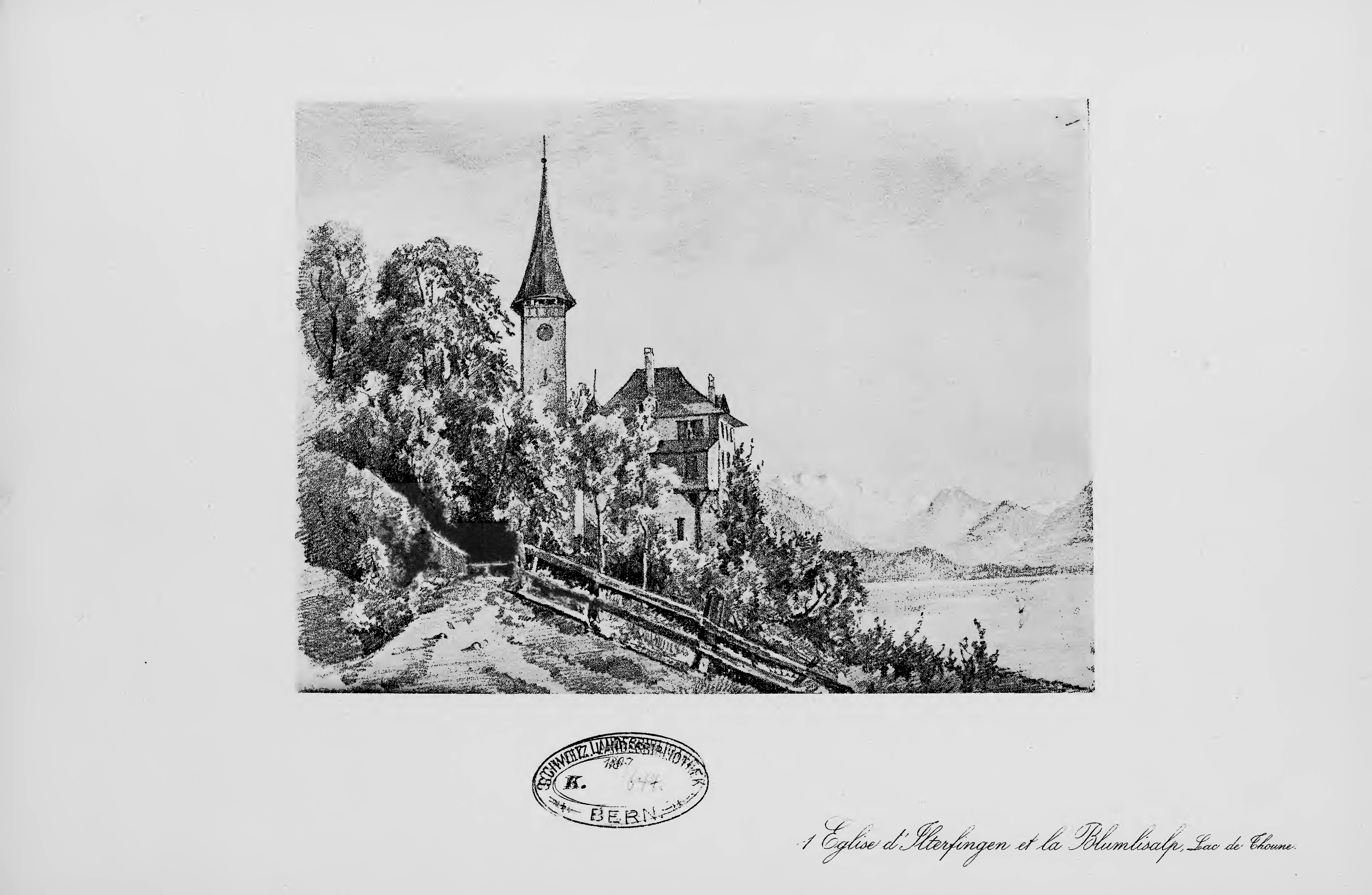
Engraving of the church of Hilterfingen from 1897

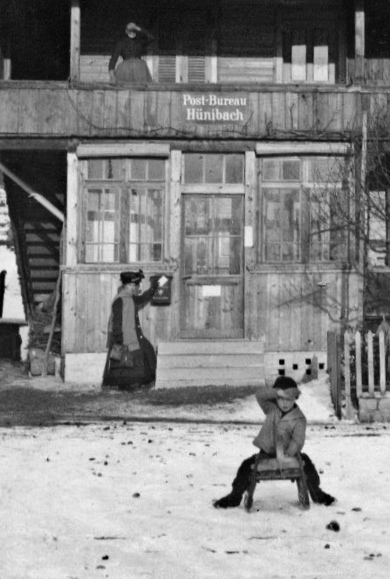
Hünibach Post Office in 1925

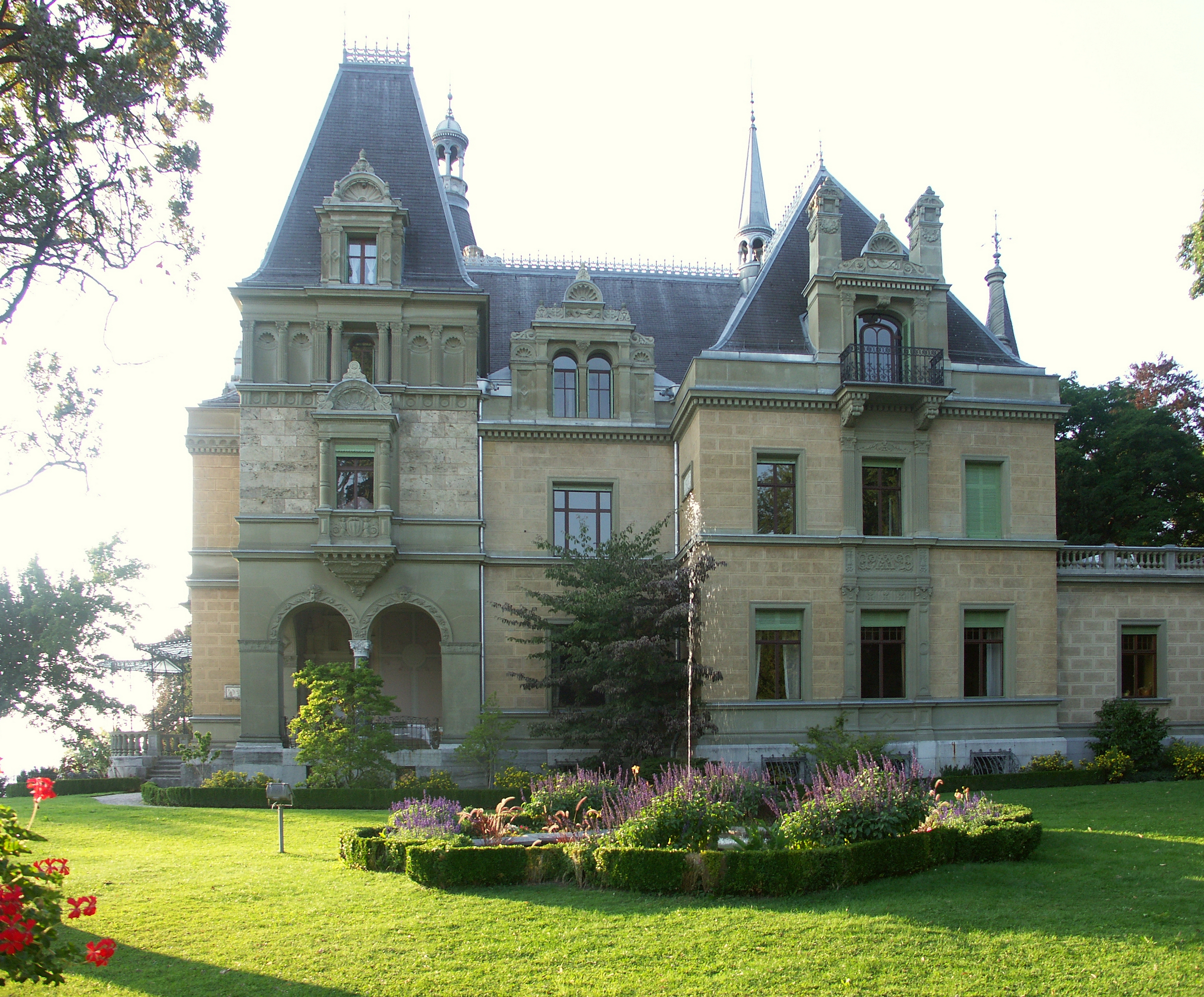
Hünegg Castle

Hilterfingen is first mentioned in 1175 as Hiltolfingen.

The oldest trace of a settlement in the area are some early-Bronze Age graves near Hünegg and Aebnit. The area was inhabited during the Early Middle Ages as evidenced by 6th and 7th century graves at Eichbühl and Hünegg. By the Middle Ages it was owned by the Freiherr von Oberhofen, who donated the village to the college of canons at Amsoldingen. Over the following centuries, the college gradually became impoverished and in 1484 the Pope approved the dissolution of the college and its incorporation into the newly created college of canons of St. Vincent's cathedral in Bern. Four years later, in 1488, Hilterfingen was officially incorporated into the Bernese Thun District. It joined the Oberhofen bailiwick in 1652. Following the 1798 French invasion, Hilterfingen became part of the Helvetic Republic Canton of Oberland. After the collapse of the Republic and 1803 Act of Mediation it joined the newly recreated Thun District.

In the 19th century several wealthy patricians built three stately manor houses in the community, two of which are still visible. The first was the neo-Gothic Chartreuse Manor built in 1807 for Schultheiss Niklaus Friedrich von Mülinen. A few years later, in 1811, he founded the Swiss Historians Research Society (Schweizerische Geschichtforschende Gesellschaft) at the manor. It passed through several owners before being partially demolished in 1941 and completely destroyed in 1965. The second, Eichbühl Estate, was finished in 1860 and is today used as a school house. The final estate Hünegg Castle was built by the wealthy Prussian art collector Baron Albert Ernst von Parpart and today is a museum, which still hosts regular exhibitions.

The village church of St. Andreas is located near the municipal border. According to the "Strättliger Chronicle" it is one of the original twelve churches around Lake Thun. The first church was probably built in the 7th or 8th century. Three other churches were built on the site of the original church before the present building was built in 1727. The parish originally included Hilterfingen, Oberhofen, Heiligenschwendi, Teuffenthal (since 1936 part of the parish of Buchen) and the hamlet Ringoldswil (since 1870 part of the Sigriswil parish).

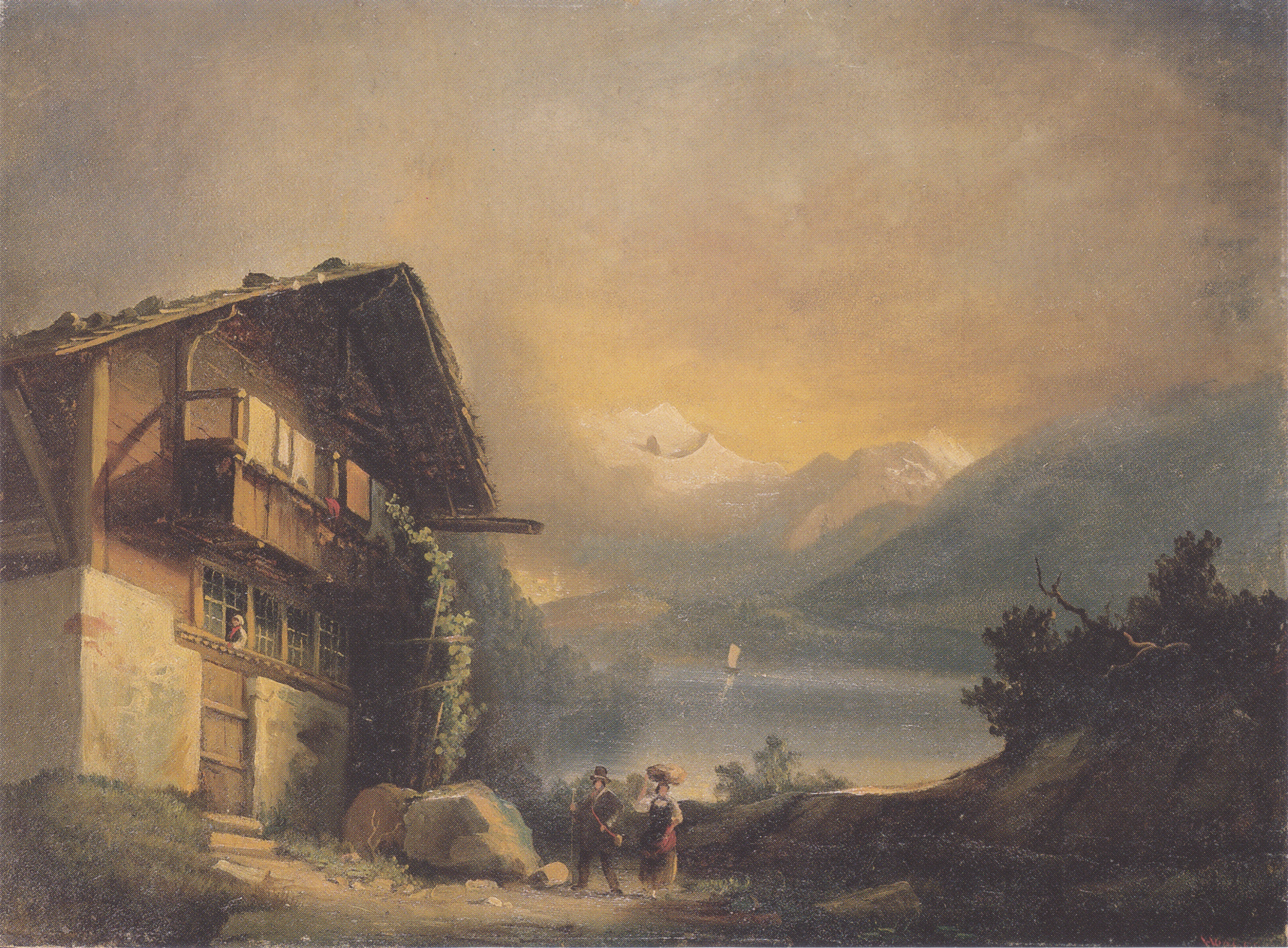
Hodler - Charlet in Hilterfingen - 1871

Traditionally the residents of the village raised vineyards and grew crops on the sunny shores of Lake Thun and fished the lake. In 1858 they acquired rights to graze cattle in three alpine meadows, but dairy farming or cattle raising were never an important part of the economy. Beginning in the 1880s demand for Lake Thun wine dropped due to a number of factors and by 1910 the last vineyards around the lake closed. However, tourism around the lake was growing and the municipality embraced the new industry. The first hotel opened in Hilterfingen in 1894, followed by a number of others. A dock was built in 1925 for the steam ships that traveled around the lake and a sailing school opened ten years later. After World War II the population grew as commuters moved out of the cities and settled along the lake front. While a number of factories and businesses settled in the municipality, today about two-thirds of the population commutes to jobs in other cities.

A middle school opened in 1895 and in 1917 merged with the school in Oberhofen. A teacher's training school opened in 1933 in Hünibach and a private secondary school was established in the village in 1968.

== Geography ==
Aerial view by Walter Mittelholzer (1925)

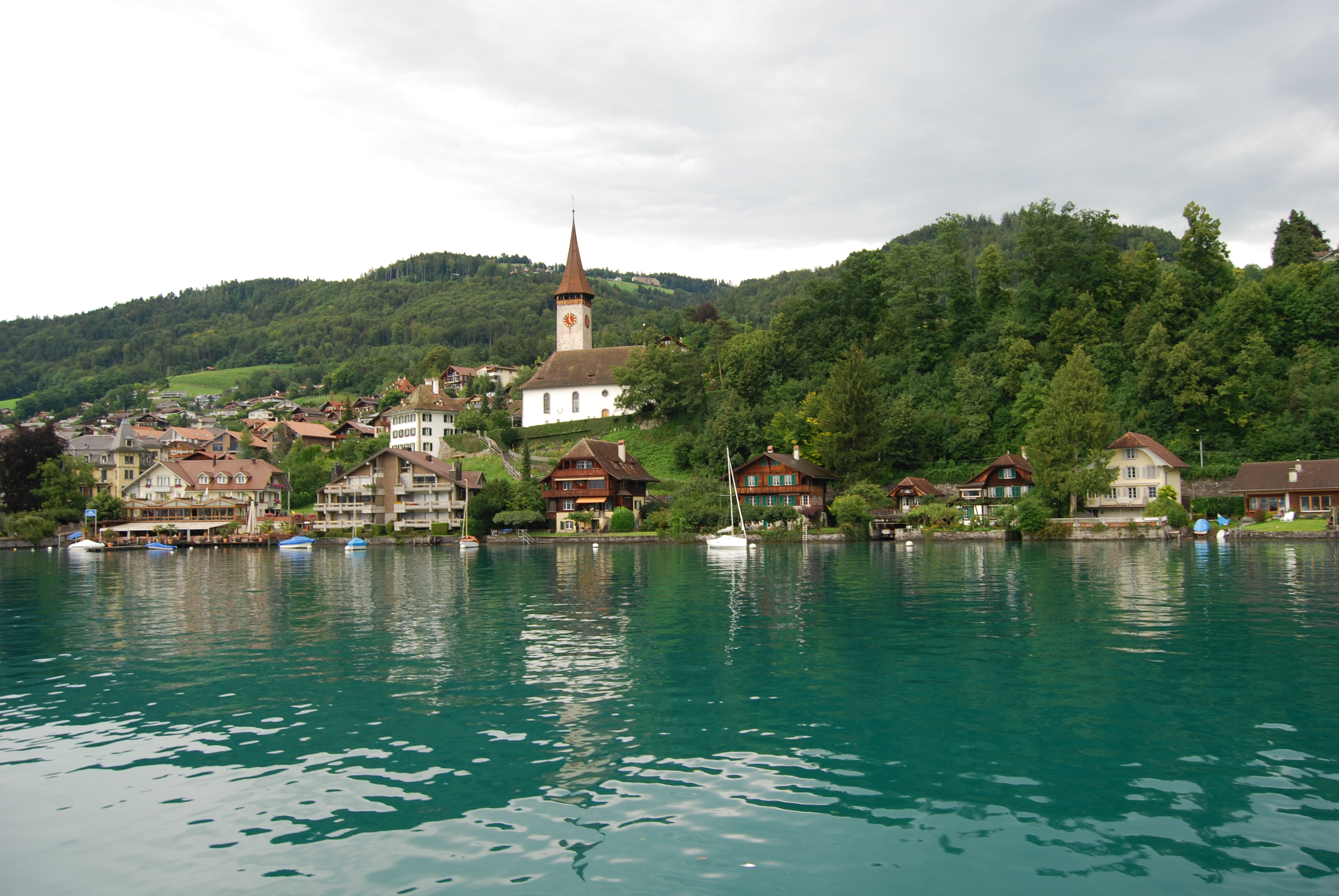
Hilterfingen

Hilterfingen has an area of 2.81 km^{2} (1.08 sq mi). As of 2012, a total of 0.24 km^{2} (0.093 mi^{2}) or 8.5% is used for agricultural purposes, while 1.36 km^{2} (0.53 mi^{2}) or 48.2% is forested. The rest of the municipality is 1.15 km^{2} (0.44 mi^{2}) or 40.8% is settled (buildings or roads), 0.03 km^{2} (7.4 acres) or 1.1% is either rivers or lakes and 0.01 km^{2} (2.5 acres) or 0.4% is unproductive land.

During the same year, housing and buildings made up 33.3% and transportation infrastructure made up 4.3%. while parks, green belts and sports fields made up 2.8%. All of the forested land area is covered with heavy forests. Of the agricultural land, 7.1% is pasturage. Of the water in the municipality, 0.7% is in lakes and 0.4% is in rivers and streams.

The village is located on the northeastern shore of Lake Thun (Thunersee). It runs from the lake shore (elevation 560 meters (1,840 ft)) to the top of the Haltenegg at 800 m (2,600 ft). It consists of village of Hilterfingen and since 1958, Hünibach, which came from Heiligenschwendi. To its north are the municipalities of Thun and Heiligenschwendi, to its south and east is the municipality of Oberhofen am Thunersee.

On 31 December 2009 Amtsbezirk Thun, the municipality's former district, was dissolved. On the following day, 1 January 2010, it joined the newly created Verwaltungskreis Thun.

== Coat of arms ==
The blazon of the municipal coat of arms is Per pale Gules and Argent, a Vine Tree Or and Vert overall growing on a Prop Or and issuing from a Mount of 3 Coupeaux Or and Vert, with two Grapes Or and two Grapes Gules and two Leaves Or and two Leaves Vert.

== Demographics ==
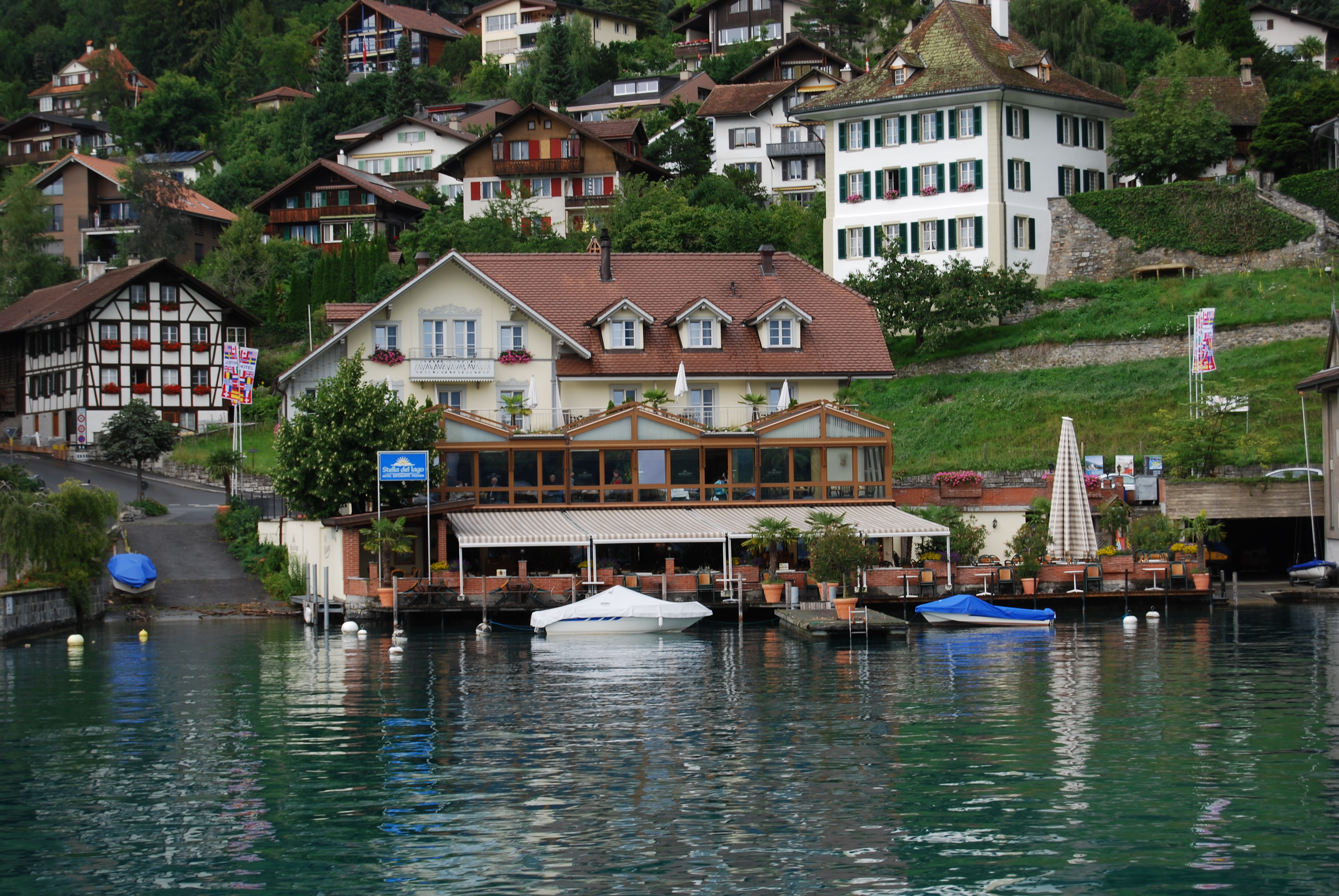
A boat ramp, sail up restaurant and Hilterfingen village

Hilterfingen has a population (as of December 2020) of 4,094. As of 2012, 8.2% of the population are resident foreign nationals. Between the last 2 years (2010–2012) the population changed at a rate of 2.1%. Migration accounted for 2.6%, while births and deaths accounted for -0.8%.

Most of the population (as of 2000) speaks German (3,593 or 94.0%) as their first language, French is the second most common (35 or 0.9%) and English is the third (30 or 0.8%). There are 16 people who speak Italian and 3 people who speak Romansh.

As of 2008, the population was 45.5% male and 54.5% female. The population was made up of 1,653 Swiss men (41.6% of the population) and 156 (3.9%) non-Swiss men. There were 2,025 Swiss women (50.9%) and 143 (3.6%) non-Swiss women. Of the population in the municipality, 624 or about 16.3% were born in Hilterfingen and lived there in 2000. There were 1,928 or 50.5% who were born in the same canton, while 689 or 18.0% were born somewhere else in Switzerland, and 411 or 10.8% were born outside of Switzerland.

As of 2012, children and teenagers (0–19 years old) make up 17.4% of the population, while adults (20–64 years old) make up 56.6% and seniors (over 64 years old) make up 25.9%.

As of 2000, there were 1,460 people who were single and never married in the municipality. There were 1,802 married individuals, 348 widows or widowers and 211 individuals who are divorced.

As of 2010, there were 735 households that consist of only one person and 71 households with five or more people. In 2000, a total of 1,777 apartments (88.9% of the total) were permanently occupied, while 169 apartments (8.5%) were seasonally occupied and 52 apartments (2.6%) were empty. As of 2012, the construction rate of new housing units was 6.2 new units per 1000 residents. The vacancy rate for the municipality, in 2013, was 0.1%. In 2012, single family homes made up 56.6% of the total housing in the municipality.

The historical population is given in the following chart:

^{A} Hünibach had a population of 369 before it joined Hilterfingen in 1956

== Economy ==
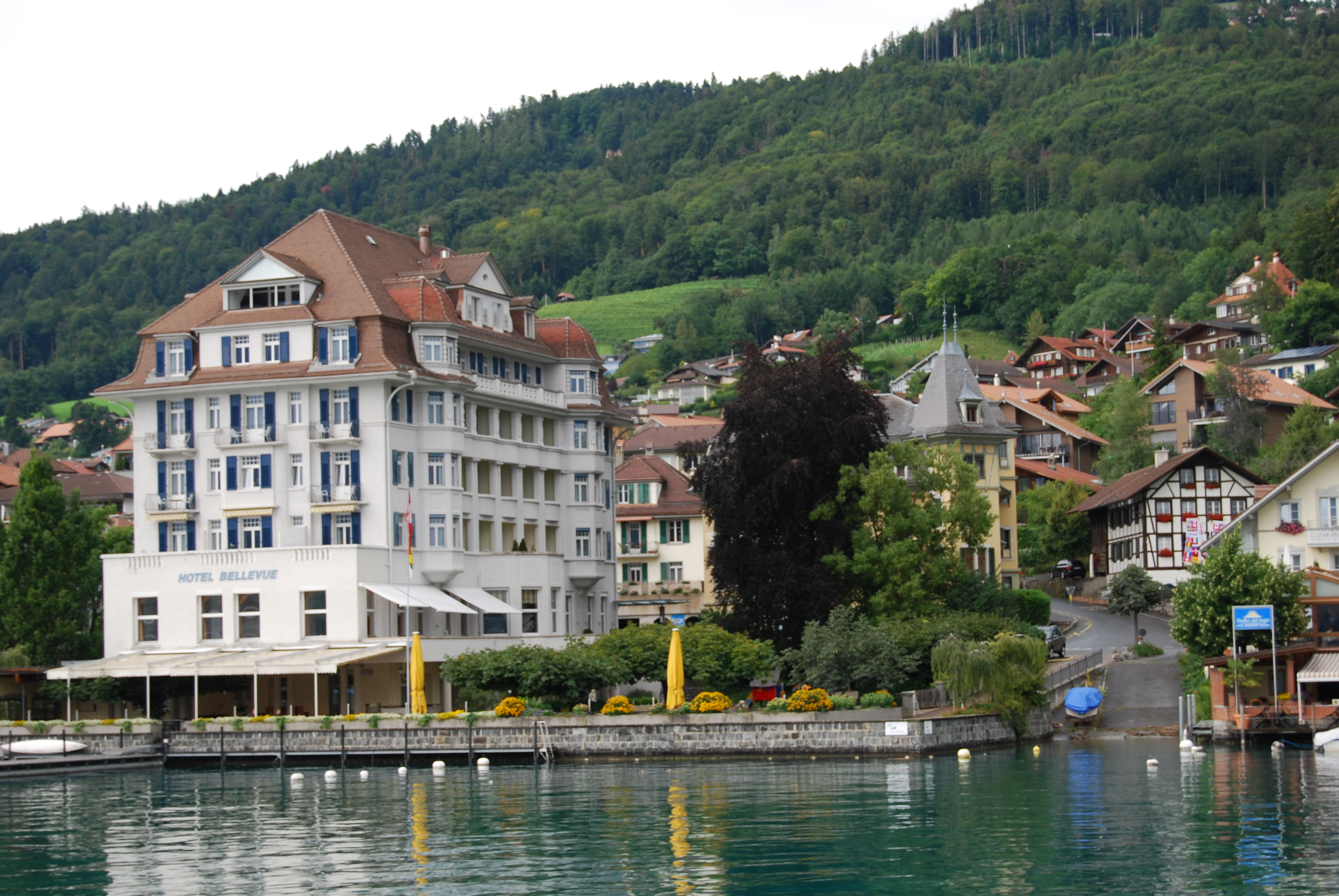
Hotel Bellevue at Hilterfingen

As of 2011, Hilterfingen had an unemployment rate of 1.96%. As of 2011, there were a total of 942 people employed in the municipality. Of these, there were 21 people employed in the primary economic sector and about 3 businesses involved in this sector. The secondary sector employs 153 people and there were 25 businesses in this sector. The tertiary sector employs 768 people, with 199 businesses in this sector. There were 1,816 residents of the municipality who were employed in some capacity, of which females made up 45.6% of the workforce.

In 2008 there were a total of 583 full-time equivalent jobs. The number of jobs in the primary sector was 5, all of which were in agriculture. The number of jobs in the secondary sector was 129 of which 58 or (45.0%) were in manufacturing and 72 (55.8%) were in construction. The number of jobs in the tertiary sector was 449. In the tertiary sector; 89 or 19.8% were in wholesale or retail sales or the repair of motor vehicles, 19 or 4.2% were in the movement and storage of goods, 57 or 12.7% were in a hotel or restaurant, 6 or 1.3% were in the information industry, 34 or 7.6% were technical professionals or scientists, 52 or 11.6% were in education and 105 or 23.4% were in health care.

In 2000, there were 539 workers who commuted into the municipality and 1,407 workers who commuted away. The municipality is a net exporter of workers, with about 2.6 workers leaving the municipality for every one entering. A total of 409 workers (43.1% of the 948 total workers in the municipality) both lived and worked in Hilterfingen. Of the working population, 24% used public transportation to get to work, and 49.6% used a private car.

The local and cantonal tax rate in Hilterfingen is one of the lowest in the canton. In 2012 the average local and cantonal tax rate on a married resident, with two children, of Hilterfingen making 150,000 CHF was 11.7%, while an unmarried resident's rate was 17.5%. For comparison, the average rate for the entire canton in 2011, was 14.2% and 22.0%, while the nationwide average was 12.3% and 21.1% respectively.

In 2010 there were a total of 1,860 tax payers in the municipality. Of that total, 739 made over 75,000 CHF per year. There were 13 people who made between 15,000 and 20,000 per year. The average income of the over 75,000 CHF group in Hilterfingen was 149,310 CHF, while the average across all of Switzerland was 131,244 CHF.

In 2011 a total of 3.4% of the population received direct financial assistance from the government.

== Heritage sites of national significance ==
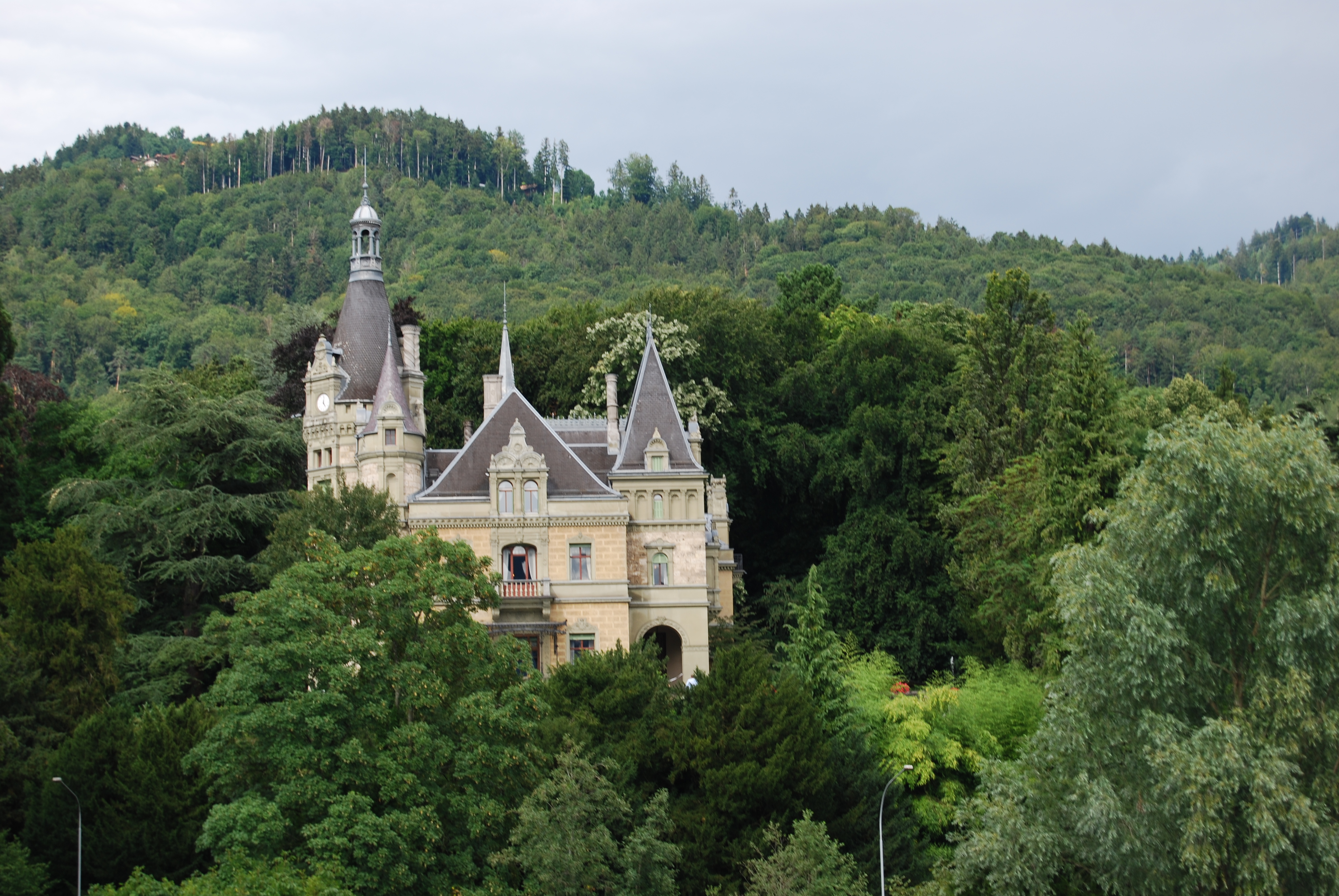
Hünegg Castle from Lake Thun

Hünegg Castle is listed as a Swiss heritage site of national significance.

Hünegg Castle was built by the wealthy Prussian art collector Baron Albert Ernst von Parpart who married the widow Adelheid de Rougemont of Chartreuse Manor in 1846. In 1861-63 he built Hünegg to house his art collection. After his death in 1869 the estate passed through a few owners until 1883 when it to one of his nephews. The nephew then sold the art collection and castle in 1893. The German industrialist K.L.K. Lehmann bought the castle and then sold it in 1899 to the architect Gustav Lemke from Wiesbaden. Lemke renovated the building in the Art Nouveau style. At the beginning of World War II the castle was sold to Oscar Haag from Küsnacht, who then sold the building to the Canton in 1958. The Canton converted it into an Art Nouveau (Jugendstil) museum, which still hosts regular exhibitions. The historic sailing school is also located on the castle grounds.

=== Sights ===
Eichbühl farm was originally owned by the Amsoldingen college of canons and passed to the canons of Bern after Amsoldingen closed. In 1773 the Canton of Bern acquired the farm. It was sold in 1835 to an English botanist named Brown. He then sold it in 1849 to the famous archeologist G.K.F. von Bonstetten who began to build Eichbühl Estate, which was finished in 1860. At the beginning of World War II his descendants sold the house to the municipality, who used it as a school house.

== Politics ==
In the 2011 federal election the most popular party was the Swiss People's Party (SVP) which received 22.3% of the vote. The next three most popular parties were the Social Democratic Party (SP) (17.5%), the Conservative Democratic Party (BDP) (16.9%) and the FDP.The Liberals (13.0%). In the federal election, a total of 1,798 votes were cast, and the voter turnout was 57.9%.

== Religion ==
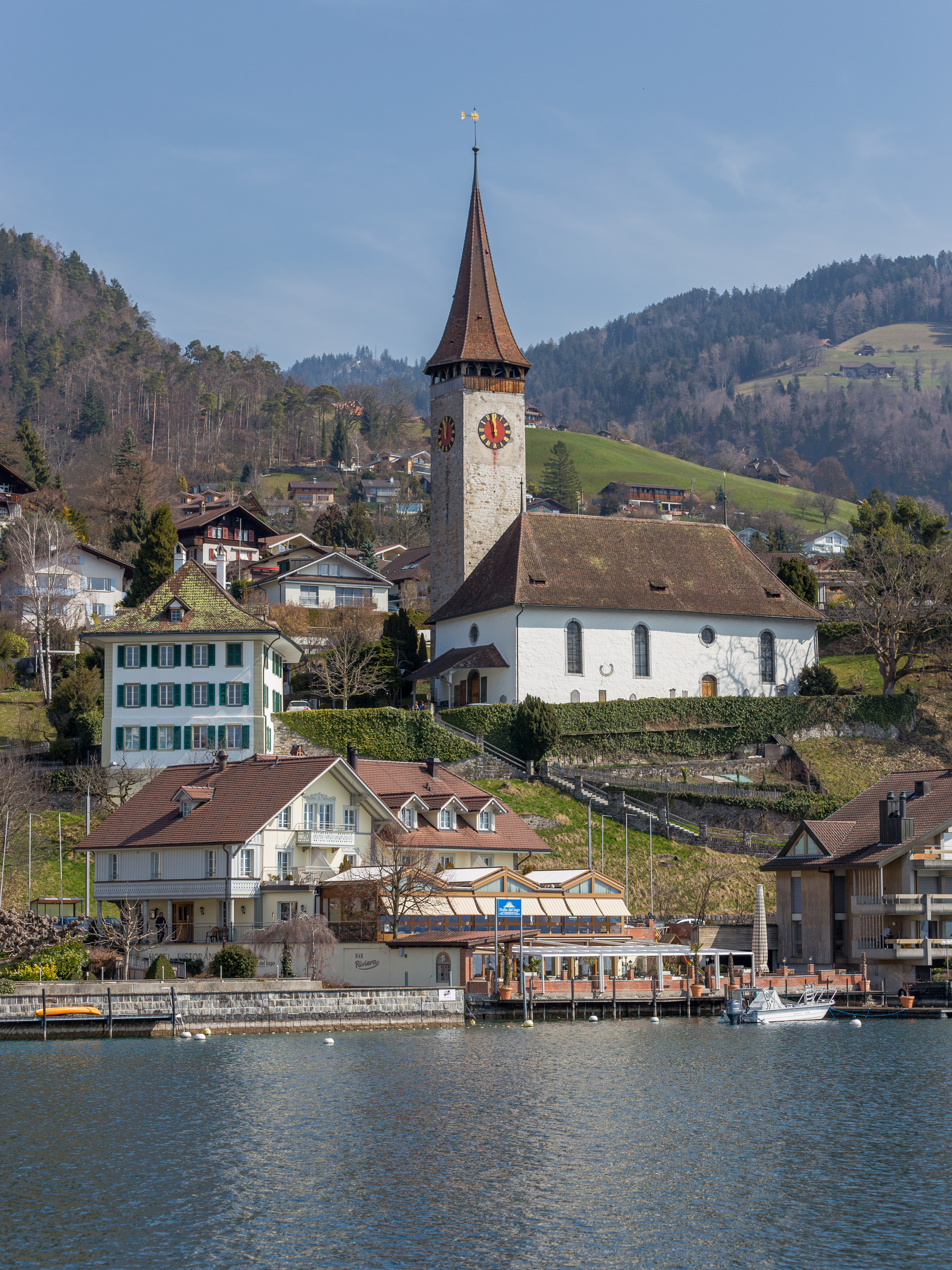
Hilterfingen church at Lake Thun

From the 2000 census, 2,691 or 70.4% belonged to the Swiss Reformed Church, while 467 or 12.2% were Roman Catholic. Of the rest of the population, there were 19 members of an Orthodox church (or about 0.50% of the population), there were 7 individuals (or about 0.18% of the population) who belonged to the Christian Catholic Church, and there were 168 individuals (or about 4.40% of the population) who belonged to another Christian church. There were 2 individuals (or about 0.05% of the population) who were Jewish, and 40 (or about 1.05% of the population) who were Muslim. There were 7 individuals who were Buddhist, 34 individuals who were Hindu and 1 individual who belonged to another church. 277 (or about 7.25% of the population) belonged to no church, are agnostic or atheist, and 108 individuals (or about 2.83% of the population) did not answer the question.

== Education ==
In Hilterfingen about 57.1% of the population have completed non-mandatory upper secondary education, and 26.4% have completed additional higher education (either university or a Fachhochschule). Of the 677 who had completed some form of tertiary schooling listed in the census, 70.2% were Swiss men, 23.0% were Swiss women, 5.2% were non-Swiss men and 1.6% were non-Swiss women.

The Canton of Bern school system provides one year of non-obligatory Kindergarten, followed by six years of Primary school. This is followed by three years of obligatory lower Secondary school where the students are separated according to ability and aptitude. Following the lower Secondary students may attend additional schooling or they may enter an apprenticeship.

During the 2012–13 school year, there were a total of 413 students attending classes in Hilterfingen. There were a total of 83 students in the German language kindergarten classes in the municipality. Of the kindergarten students, 10.8% were permanent or temporary residents of Switzerland (not citizens) and 6.0% have a different mother language than the classroom language. The municipality's primary school had 151 students in German language classes. Of the primary students, 3.3% were permanent or temporary residents of Switzerland (not citizens) and 7.3% have a different mother language than the classroom language. During the same year, the lower secondary school had a total of 179 students. There were 8.9% who were permanent or temporary residents of Switzerland (not citizens) and 11.7% have a different mother language than the classroom language.

As of 2000, there were a total of 361 students attending any school in the municipality. Of those, 249 both lived and attended school in the municipality, while 112 students came from another municipality. During the same year, 182 residents attended schools outside the municipality.
