= Oberhofen Castle =

Castle in the Canton of Bern, Switzerland

- Schloss Oberhofen
- Oberhofen am Thunersee
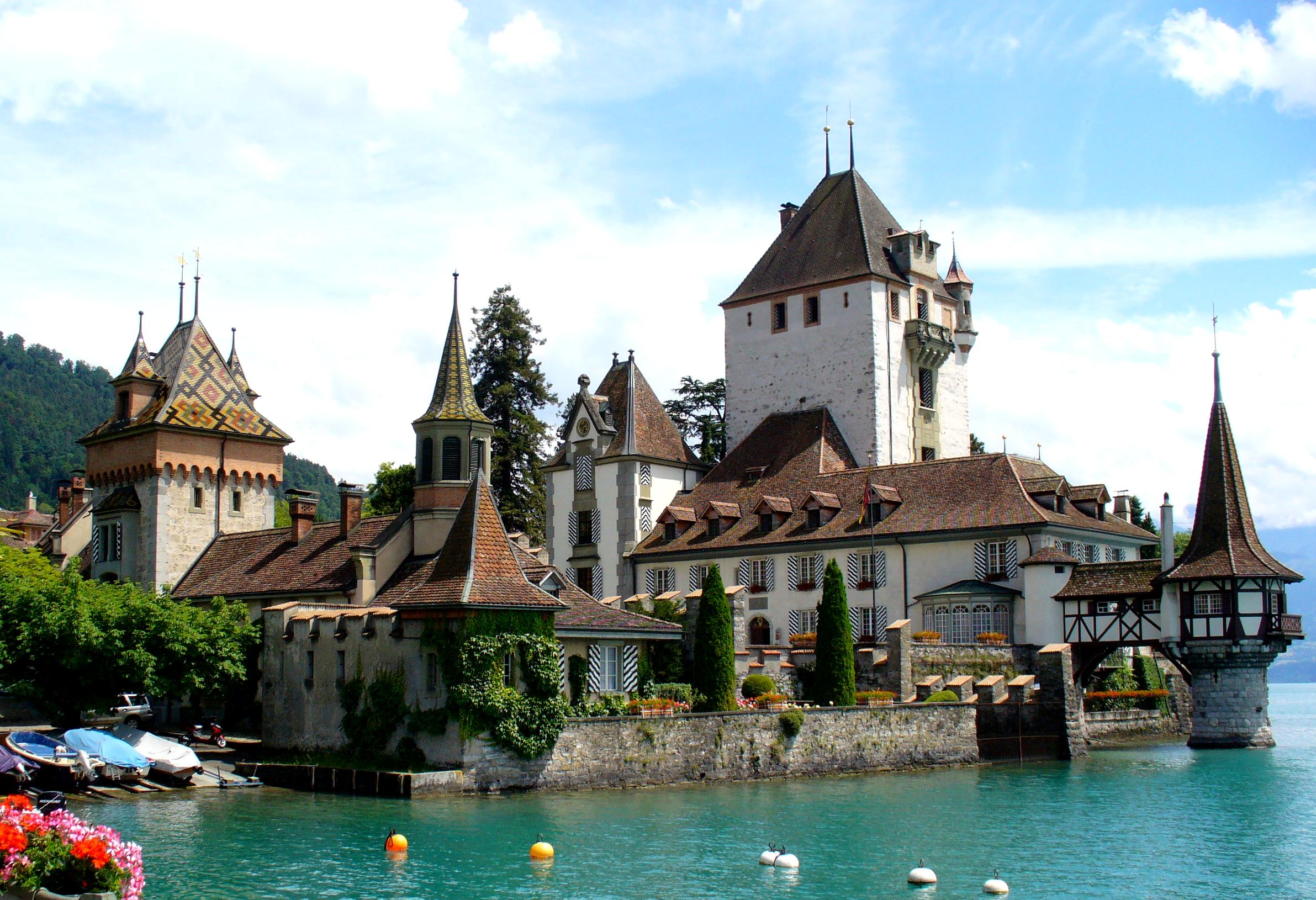
- Oberhofen Castle from Lake Thun

Site information
- Type: water castle
- Code: CH-BE
- Condition: Preserved

Location
- Coordinates: 46°43′47″N 7°40′07″E

Site history
- Built: 13th century

Garrison information
- Occupants: Freiherr, now Historical Museum of Bern

Oberhofen Castle is a castle in the municipality of Oberhofen of the Canton of Bern in Switzerland. It is a Swiss heritage site of national significance.

== History ==
During the High Middle Ages the Freiherr von Oberhofen built Balm Castle on a hill above the village. In 1200, a daughter of the family, Ita, married into the von Eschenbach family and gave this family the castle and village. In the 13th century they began a new, moated castle on the shores of Lake Thun. One of the last owners of the castle, Walter IV von Eschenbach, was assassinated along with King Albert I in 1308 by Albert's nephew John. In 1306 the von Eschenbach family was forced to sell Oberhofen and the castle to the Habsburgs. The Habsburgs appointed a succession of vassals to administer the area for them, especially the Kyburgs who also owned Thun Castle. Following the Kyburg defeat in the Burgdorferkrieg of 1383-84 and the decisive Habsburg defeat at the Battle of Sempach in 1386, Bern began to expand into the Austrian lands in the Bernese Oberland. They occupied Oberhofen in 1386 and were finally able to purchase or usurp all the land and rights from every feudal land holder in 1397. In the following year they sold the castle and Oberhofen Herrschaft to Ludwig von Seftigen, a citizen of Bern.

Over the following centuries the town, castle and herrschaft passed through several Bernese patrician families. After the male line of the von Erlach family in Oberhofen died out in 1652, Bern acquired the castle and lands. They created the bailiwick of Oberhofen and converted Oberhofen Castle into the administrative center for the bailiwick. Following the 1798 French invasion, Oberhofen am Thunersee became part of the Helvetic Republic Canton of Oberland. After the collapse of the Republic and 1803 Act of Mediation it joined the newly created Thun District.

The castle passed into private hands after 1803 and had several owners in the following years. In 1849-52 the Pourtàles family renovated and expanded the castle to its present appearance. In 1940 the American William Maul Measy established the Oberhofen Castle foundation to administer and maintain the castle. In 1952 it became a part of the Historical Museum of Bern and two years later they opened a branch in the castle.

In the 2010s, a restaurant named the Restaurant Schloss Oberhofen, in a modern building at the water's edge, was constructed in the castle's courtyard, and it opened in 2013.

== Castle site ==
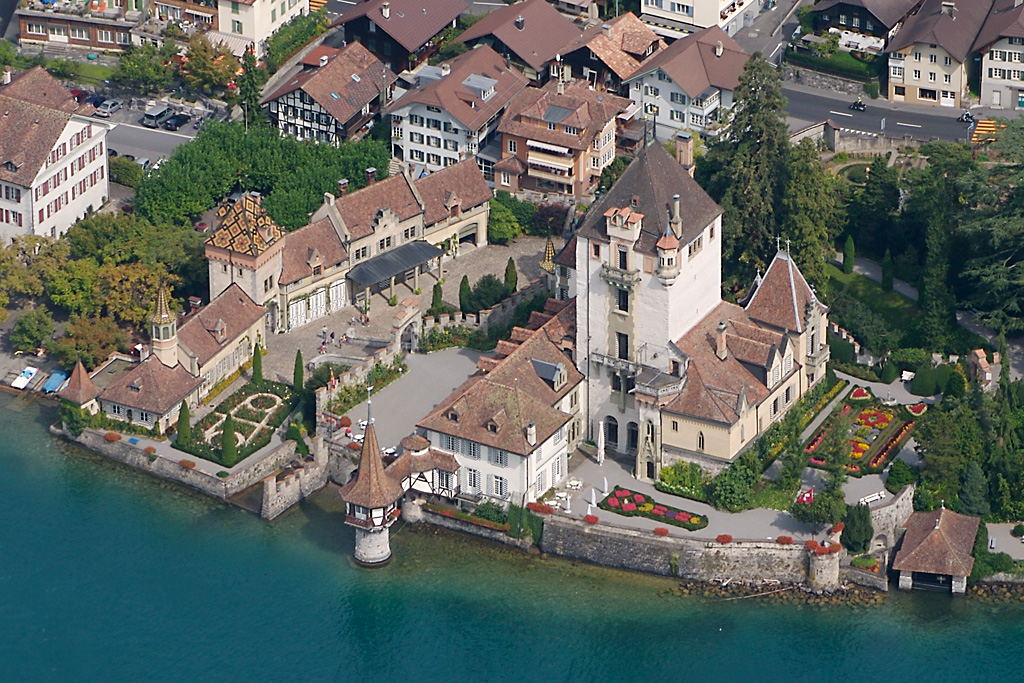
Aerial view of Oberhofen Castle

The central keep probably dates from around 1200 and is about 11 by 12.5 meters (36 ft × 41 ft) with 2 m (6.6 ft) thick walls. The rest of the castle developed in the following centuries around this ancient keep. A chapel was added to the first floor of the keep on the lake side in 1473. Perhaps at the same time a tower was built in the lake. The lake tower appears in an illustration of the castle in 1680.

After Bern took over the castle from the von Erlach family it became the seat of a Bernese bailiff and was expanded. By 1700, the Bernese renovations were mostly complete. The original tower was partly surrounded by new buildings done in the Bernese Baroque style. On the lake side the Garden Room was built and the water tower demolished. Over the next centuries, the castle remained virtually unchanged until the castle went back into private ownership. The Neuchâtel-Prussian Count de Pourtàles rebuilt the castle in a Romantic style between 1849 and 1852. The north-eastern side of the keep was rebuilt, as was the entire western facade. A 2.5 ha (6.2 acres) park was added south of the castle. The water tower was rebuilt and crowned with a fanciful spire. In the interior of the castle, a dining hall and grand hall were built. On the upper floors the ornate library and a Turkish smoking room were added. The Turkish smoking room was based on similar rooms from wealthy houses in Cairo and built in 1853 to 1855 on plans from the Bernese architect Theodor Zerleeder. Count Albert Alexander de Pourtalès had spent several years in Istanbul as a Prussian diplomat.

== Gallery ==
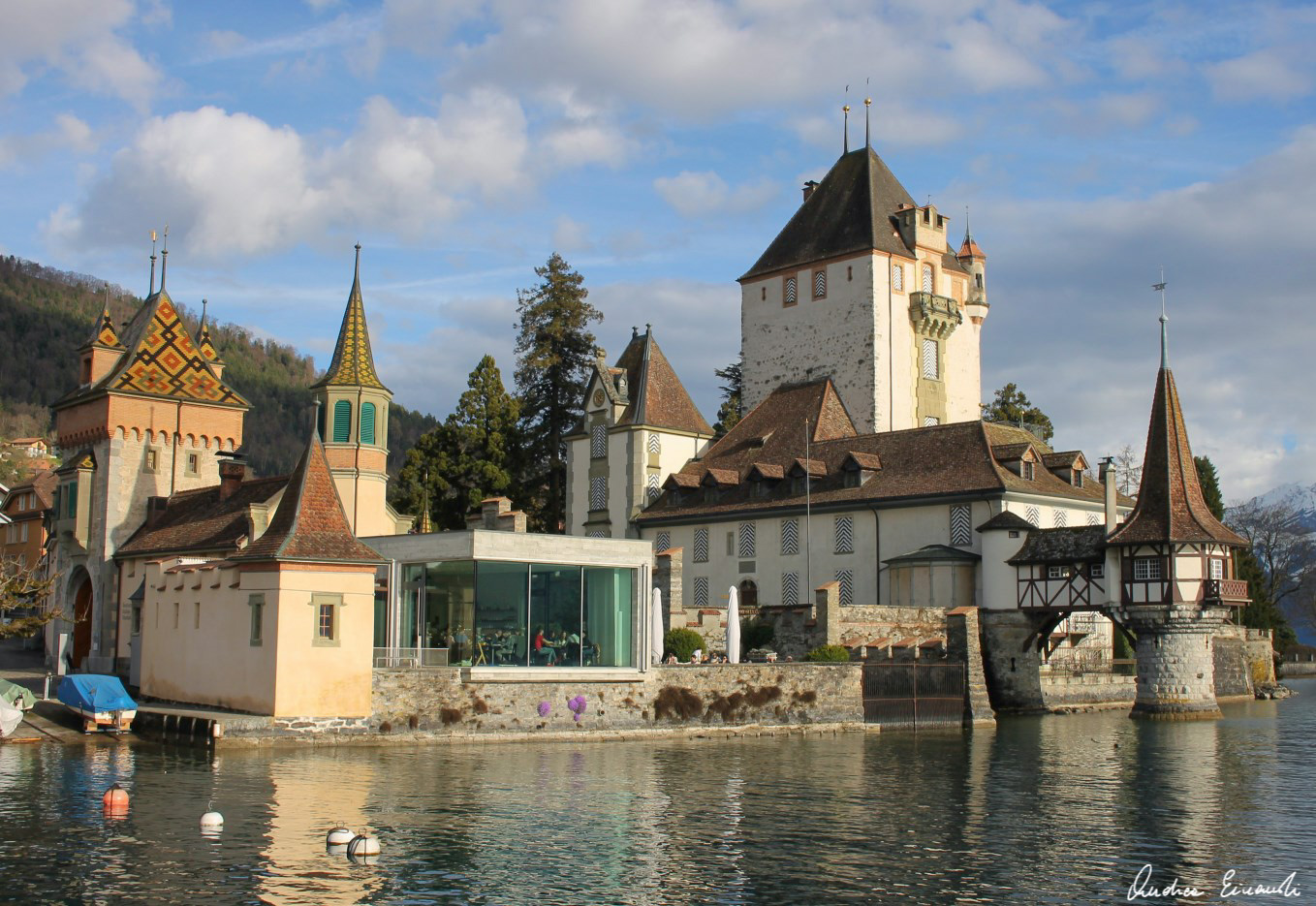
Oberhofen castle

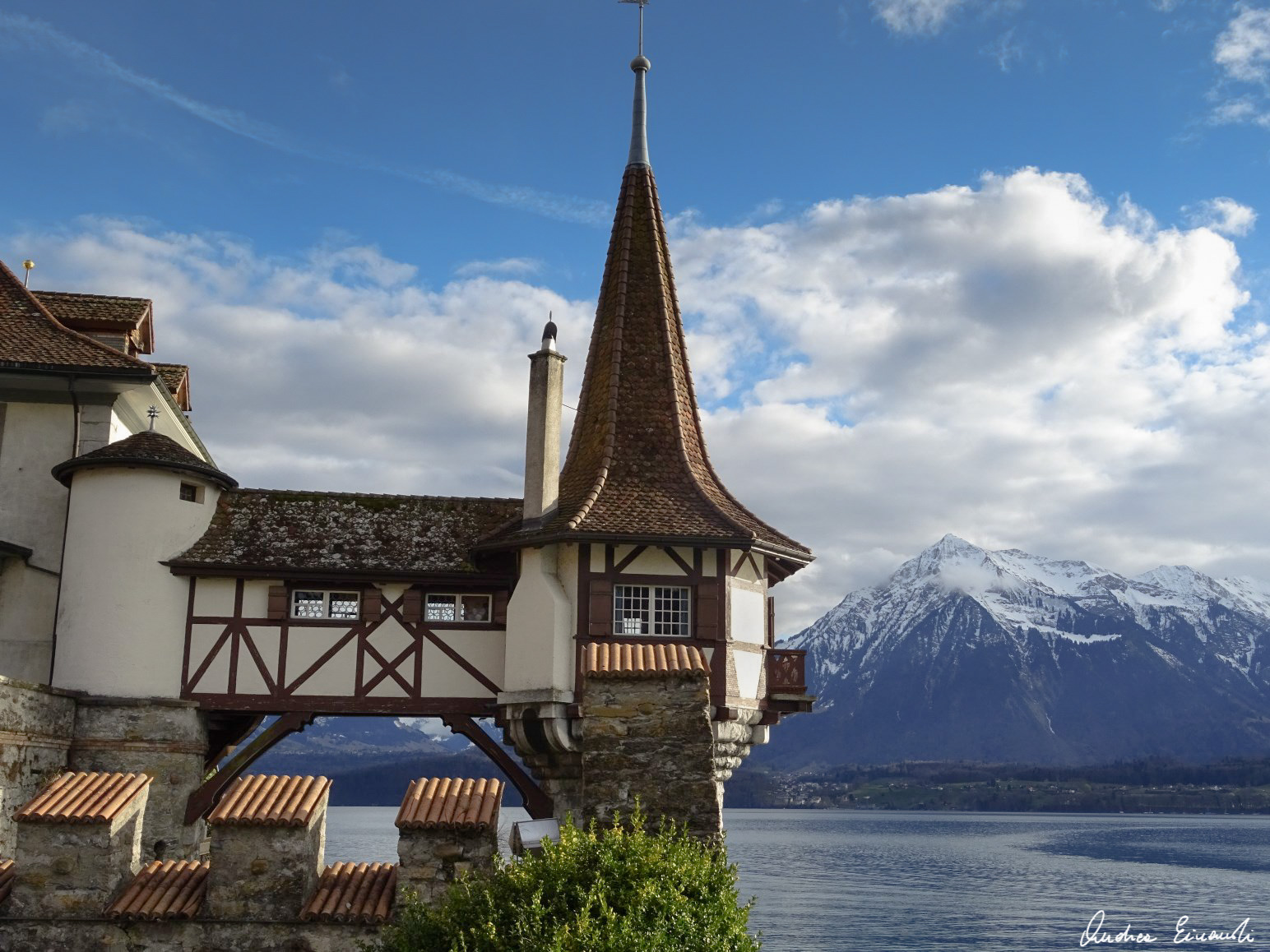
Water tower

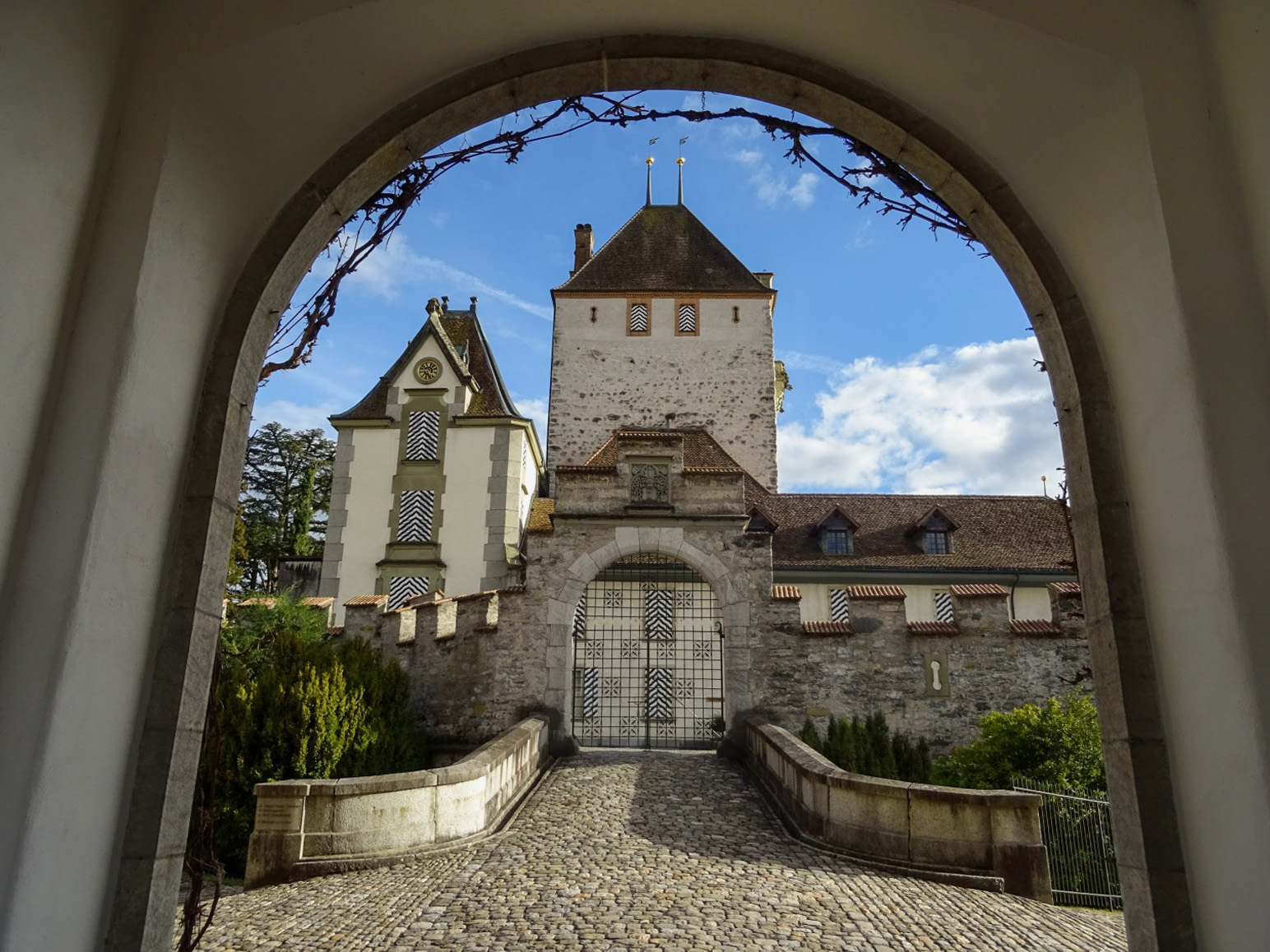
Internal gate

== See also ==
- List of castles in Switzerland
