= Amsoldingen Castle =

Castle in Amsoldingen, Switzerland

- Schloss Amsoldingen
- Amsoldingen
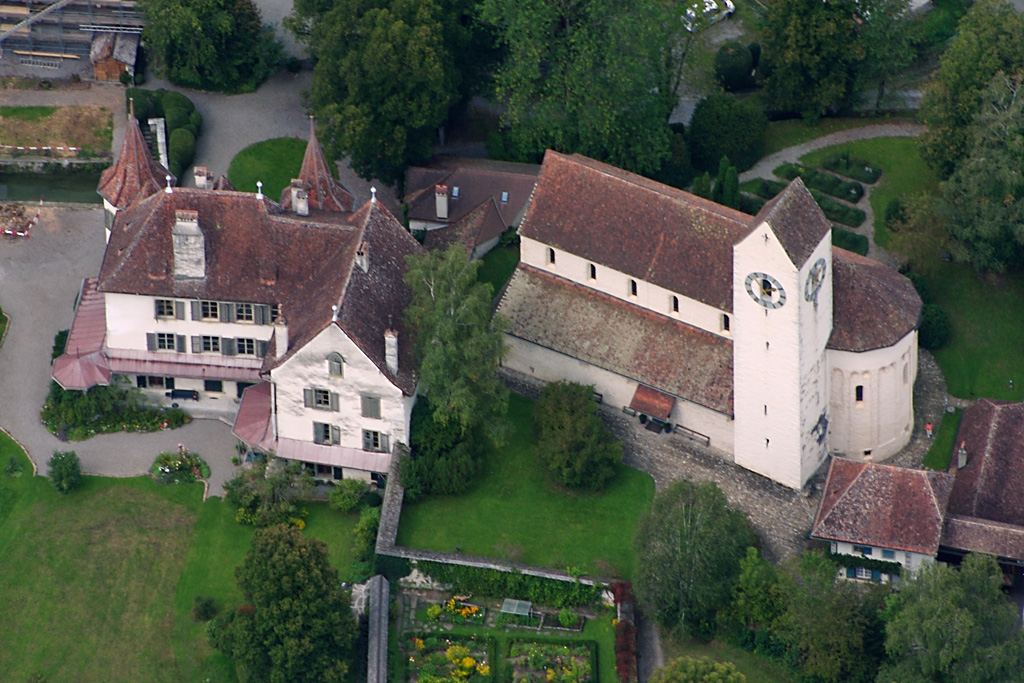
- Amsoldingen Castle

Site information
- Type: Castle
- Owner: Canton of Bern
- Open to the public: no

Location
- Coordinates: 46.727182°N 7.578859°E

Site history
- Built: 10th century
- Materials: stone

Swiss Cultural Property of National Significance

Amsoldingen Castle (German: Schloss Amsoldingen) is a castle in the municipality of Amsoldingen in the canton of Bern in Switzerland. The castle and associated former collegiate church of St. Mauritius are a Swiss heritage site of national significance.

== History ==
=== Amsoldingen Castle ===
Amsoldingen Castle and the neighboring was built in the 10th century. The castle was built as the residence of the wealthy provost of the collegiate church of Amsoldingen. However, the provost and church gradually became impoverished and in 1484 ownership of the castle was given to St. Vincent's cathedral in Bern. The college of canons in Bern sold the castle and surrounding lands in 1496 to the wealthy merchant Barthlome May. In 1536, Barthlome's grandson, Sulpitius May, sold the castle, after which it passed through a number of owners.

By the end of the 17th century it was owned by the engineer and surveyor Samuel Bodmer. Between 1711 and 1724, Bodmer lived in the castle as he designed the flood control system around Thun Lake and the Aare River to protect the villages and farm land from floods. During the 18th and early 19th century the castle was owned by the Luternau family who built the parks around the castle. It was sold in 1815 to Ludwig Zeerleder, who then sold it to Alfred de Rougemont von Bonstetten, who later sold it to Beat Ludwig Tscharner von Erlach. Under von Erlach the castle was rebuilt in a neo-Gothic style in 1846.

=== Former collegiate church of St. Mauritius ===
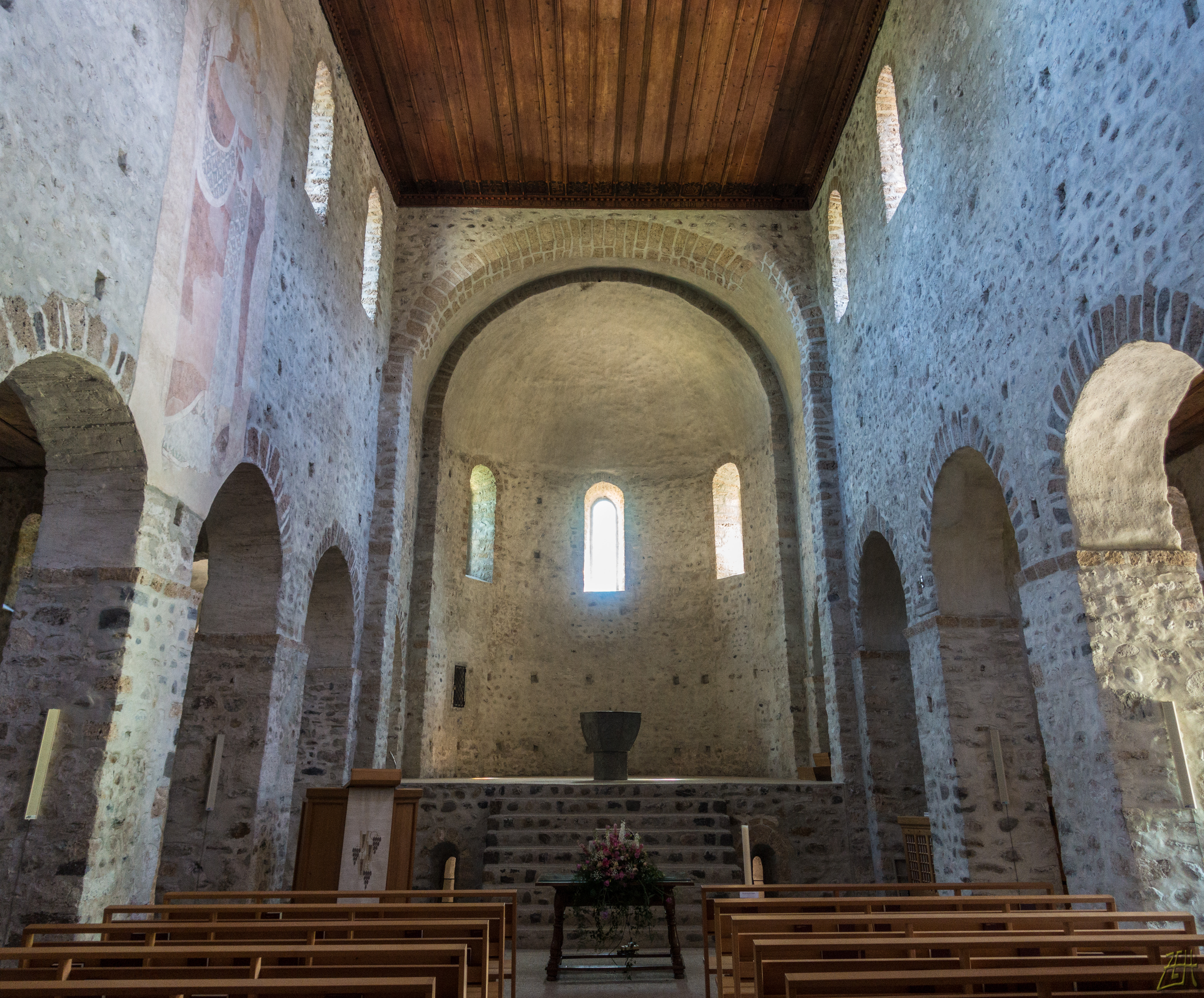
Interior of the church, showing the three-aisles, the raised apse and the wooden ceiling

The first church on the site was built in the early Romanesque style in the 6th century. Like the castle, the former collegiate church of St. Mauritius was built in the 10th century. The Ottonian three-aisle church was built from stone scavenged from the ruins of Aventicum on the foundations of the earlier church. According to tradition, the stift or donation that supported the church was made in the 10th century by the King of Burgundy Rudolph II. It was one of the twelve churches that he founded around Lake Thun. Around 1210, the 10th century church was modified with the construction of the crypt and renovation of the south aisle. The church is first mentioned in a record in 1228. Around 1300, the interior of the church was covered with murals including the still visible painting of Saint Christopher on the north wall. The southern side apse was demolished and a Romanesque bell tower was added between 1345 and 1486.

Over the following centuries, the stift gradually became impoverished and in 1484 the Pope approved the dissolution of the Stift and its incorporation into the newly created stift of St. Vincent's cathedral in Bern. The church became the parish church of Amsoldingen. In 1528 the Protestant Reformation spread through the region and the church became a Protestant church. In 1576 a fire damaged the church, forcing a major renovation. A new roof was built and the main apse was raised in 1576. The following year a new pulpit was built. The oldest of the four bells was hung in the bell tower in 1579. The wooden ceiling was added in 1661 or 1666 and a mural of the Last Supper was painted in 1668.

== See also ==
- List of castles in Switzerland
