= Thun District =

Coordinates: 46.75°N 7.61667°E

Thun District Amtsbezirk Thun
- District
- Flag Coat of arms

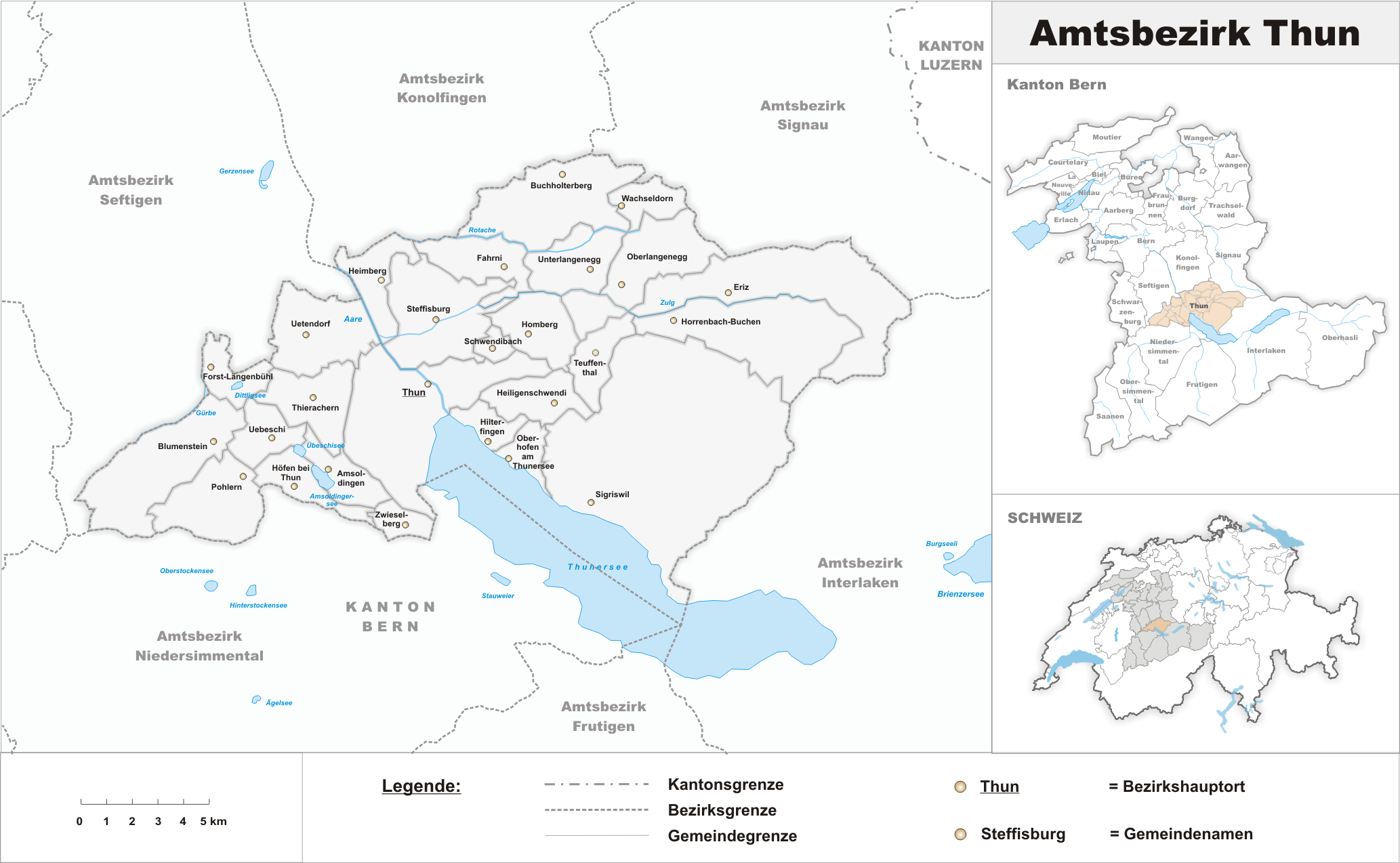
- Country: Switzerland
- Canton: Bern
- Capital: Thun

Area
  - Total: 267 km^{2} (103 sq mi)

Population (2007)
  - Total: 92,363
  - Density: 346/km^{2} (896/sq mi)
- Time zone: UTC+1 (CET)
  - Summer (DST): UTC+2 (CEST)
- Municipalities: 26

Thun District is one of the 26 administrative districts in the canton of Bern, Switzerland. Its capital is the municipality of Thun.

On 1 January 2010, the district's administrative functions were transferred to the newly established and enlarged Thun (administrative district), though Thun itself remained the administrative centre.

Since 2010, it has continued to be a fully recognized district under the law and Constitution (Art.3 al.2) of the Canton of Berne.

The district covers an area of 285 km² and comprises 27 municipalities:

Municipality	Population (Dec 2007)	Area (km^{2})
Amsoldingen	804	4.7
Blumenstein	1,161	15.5
Buchholterberg	1,486	15.3
Eriz	516	21.8
Fahrni	741	6.7
Forst-Längenbühl	724	4.5
Heiligenschwendi	629	5.6
Heimberg	5,981	5.4
Hilterfingen	3,955	2.8
Höfen	384	4.6
Homberg	500	6.5
Horrenbach-Buchen	272	20.4
Oberhofen am Thunersee	2338	2.8
Oberlangenegg	503	9.1
Pohlern	270	9.9
Schwendibach	251	1.5
Sigriswil	4,494	55.4
Steffisburg	15,380	13.5
Teuffenthal (BE)	176	4.6
Thierachern	2,177	7.5
Thun	41,642	21.6
Uebeschi	693	4.4
Uetendorf	5,906	10.2
Unterlangenegg	904	6.8
Wachseldorn	239	3.5
Zwieselberg	266	2.4
