= Unterlangenegg =

- Municipality
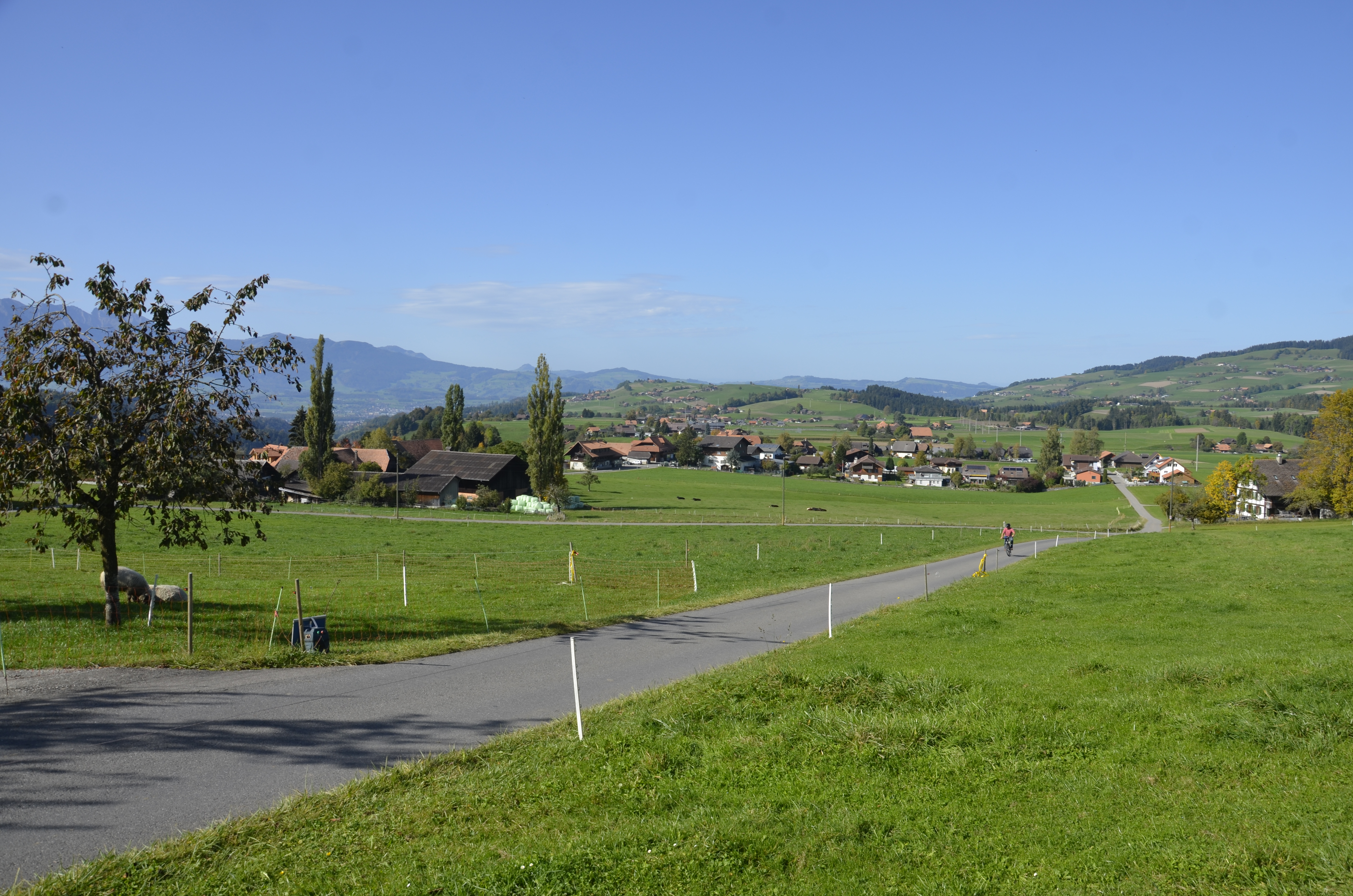

- Flag Coat of arms
- Location of Unterlangenegg
- Location within Switzerland Location within Canton of Bern
- Coordinates: 46°47′N 7°43′E
- Country: Switzerland
- Canton: Bern
- District: Thun

Government
  - Mayor: Rudolf Reusser

Area
  - Total: 6.81 km^{2} (2.63 sq mi)
- Elevation: 831 m (2,726 ft)

Population (Dec 2012)
  - Total: 927
  - Density: 136/km^{2} (353/sq mi)
- Time zone: UTC+01:00 (CET)
  - Summer (DST): UTC+02:00 (CEST)
- Postal code: 3614
- SFOS number: 945
- ISO 3166 code: CH-BE
- Surrounded by: Buchholterberg, Fahrni, Homberg, Horrenbach-Buchen, Oberlangenegg, Wachseldorn
- Website: www.unterlangenegg.ch

Unterlangenegg is a municipality in the administrative district of Thun in the canton of Bern in Switzerland.

== History ==
Unterlangenegg is first mentioned in 1308 as Langonegga.

During the Middle Ages the land and scattered farms were part of the Herrschaft of Heimberg. By the 13th century, the Counts of Kyburg owned the Herrschaft. On 11 November 1382, Rudolf II of Kyburg attempted an unsuccessful raid on Solothurn. The attack started the Burgdorferkrieg with the Old Swiss Confederacy. During the war, Bern captured many of the Kyburg lands and forced them to make an unfavorable peace. As part of the peace treaty, in 1384 Bern acquired Heimberg lands including Unterlangenegg. It was assigned to the Bernese Steffisburg court in the Thun District.

The municipality was originally part of the parish of Steffisburg. In the 17th century Anabaptists began settling in the Zulg valley. Their faith threatened the Swiss Reformed faith of Bern, so in 1693 they built a large parish church in the village of Schwarzenegg and spread the new parish over the valley. The church helped Schwarzenegg grow into a local center, however it never became a municipality and today is divided between Unterlangenegg and Oberlangenegg.

In 1950 a secondary school was built in the municipality which provides an education for students from five surrounding municipalities.

== Geography ==
Aerial view (1954)

Unterlangenegg has an area of 6.8 km^{2} (2.63 sq mi). As of the 2004/06 survey, a total of 4.81 km^{2} (1.86 mi^{2}) or 70.6% is used for agricultural purposes, while 1.34 km^{2} (0.52 mi^{2}) or 19.7% is forested. Of rest of the municipality 0.59 km^{2} (0.23 mi^{2}) or 8.7% is settled (buildings or roads), 0.05 km^{2} (12 acres) or 0.7% is either rivers or lakes and 0.02 km^{2} (4.9 acres) or 0.3% is unproductive land.

From the same survey, housing and buildings made up 5.1% and transportation infrastructure made up 2.9%. A total of 18.5% of the total land area is heavily forested and 1.2% is covered with orchards or small clusters of trees. Of the agricultural land, 30.8% is used for growing crops and 36.9% is pasturage, while 2.9% is used for orchards or vine crops. All the water in the municipality is flowing water.

The municipality is located in the hills between the Zulg and Rotachen valleys. It consists of several scattered settlements and lacks a distinct village center. The municipality is made up of half of the village of Schwarzenegg (shared with Oberlangenegg), the hamlets of Kreuzweg, Bach, Zulgport and Allmend as well as scattered farm houses.

On 31 December 2009 Amtsbezirk Thun, the municipality's former district, was dissolved. On the following day, 1 January 2010, it joined the newly created Verwaltungskreis Thun.

== Coat of arms ==
The blazon of the municipal coat of arms is Quartered Sable a Castle Argent dimidiated and of the last a Fir Tree Vert trunked and eradicated Gules.

== Demographics ==
Unterlangenegg has a population (as of December 2020) of 1,018. As of 2012, 1.7% of the population are resident foreign nationals. Between the last 2 years (2010-2012) the population changed at a rate of 3.5%. Migration accounted for 4.2%, while births and deaths accounted for -0.6%.

Most of the population (as of 2000) speaks German (908 or 98.0%) as their first language, Serbo-Croatian is the second most common (5 or 0.5%) and Arabic is the third (4 or 0.4%). There are 2 people who speak French and 1 person who speaks Italian.

As of 2013, the population was 49.0% male and 51.0% female. The population was made up of 441 Swiss men (47.9% of the population) and 10 (1.1%) non-Swiss men. There were 459 Swiss women (49.9%) and 10 (1.1%) non-Swiss women. Of the population in the municipality, 391 or about 42.2% were born in Unterlangenegg and lived there in 2000. There were 393 or 42.4% who were born in the same canton, while 76 or 8.2% were born somewhere else in Switzerland, and 34 or 3.7% were born outside of Switzerland.

As of 2012, children and teenagers (0–19 years old) make up 21.8% of the population, while adults (20–64 years old) make up 60.3% and seniors (over 64 years old) make up 17.9%.

As of 2000, there were 419 people who were single and never married in the municipality. There were 420 married individuals, 59 widows or widowers and 29 individuals who are divorced.

As of 2010, there were 98 households that consist of only one person and 28 households with five or more people. In 2000, a total of 329 apartments (88.9% of the total) were permanently occupied, while 30 apartments (8.1%) were seasonally occupied and 11 apartments (3.0%) were empty. As of 2012, the construction rate of new housing units was 11.9 new units per 1000 residents. In 2012, single family homes made up 32.5% of the total housing in the municipality.

The historical population is given in the following chart:

== Economy ==
As of 2011, Unterlangenegg had an unemployment rate of 0.53%. As of 2011, there were a total of 344 people employed in the municipality. Of these, there were 122 people employed in the primary economic sector and about 44 businesses involved in this sector. The secondary sector employs 60 people and there were 21 businesses in this sector. The tertiary sector employs 162 people, with 40 businesses in this sector. There were 476 residents of the municipality who were employed in some capacity, of which females made up 39.7% of the workforce.

In 2008 there were a total of 245 full-time equivalent jobs. The number of jobs in the primary sector was 83, all of which were in agriculture. The number of jobs in the secondary sector was 54 of which 27 or (50.0%) were in manufacturing and 28 (51.9%) were in construction. The number of jobs in the tertiary sector was 108. In the tertiary sector; 31 or 28.7% were in wholesale or retail sales or the repair of motor vehicles, 13 or 12.0% were in the movement and storage of goods, 5 or 4.6% were in a hotel or restaurant, 5 or 4.6% were technical professionals or scientists, 29 or 26.9% were in education and 18 or 16.7% were in health care.

In 2000, there were 126 workers who commuted into the municipality and 260 workers who commuted away. The municipality is a net exporter of workers, with about 2.1 workers leaving the municipality for every one entering. A total of 216 workers (63.2% of the 342 total workers in the municipality) both lived and worked in Unterlangenegg. Of the working population, 8.6% used public transportation to get to work, and 51.1% used a private car.

The local and cantonal tax rate in Unterlangenegg is one of the lowest in the canton. In 2012 the average local and cantonal tax rate on a married resident, with two children, of Unterlangenegg making 150,000 CHF was 12.2%, while an unmarried resident's rate was 18.2%. For comparison, the average rate for the entire canton in 2011, was 14.2% and 22.0%, while the nationwide average was 12.3% and 21.1% respectively.

In 2010 there were a total of 363 tax payers in the municipality. Of that total, 81 made over 75,000 CHF per year. There were 9 people who made between 15,000 and 20,000 per year. The greatest number of workers, 112, made between 50,000 and 75,000 CHF per year. The average income of the over 75,000 CHF group in Unterlangenegg was 103,636 CHF, while the average across all of Switzerland was 131,244 CHF.

In 2011 a total of 3.5% of the population received direct financial assistance from the government.

== Politics ==
In the 2011 federal election the most popular party was the Swiss People's Party (SVP) which received 54.2% of the vote. The next three most popular parties were the Conservative Democratic Party (BDP) (13.3%), the Social Democratic Party (SP) (8.9%) and the Green Party (5.7%). In the federal election, a total of 360 votes were cast, and the voter turnout was 49.9%.

== Religion ==
From the 2000 census, 813 or 87.7% belonged to the Swiss Reformed Church, while 34 or 3.7% were Roman Catholic. Of the rest of the population, there were 6 members of an Orthodox church (or about 0.65% of the population), and there were 16 individuals (or about 1.73% of the population) who belonged to another Christian church. There were 2 (or about 0.22% of the population) who were Muslim. 29 (or about 3.13% of the population) belonged to no church, are agnostic or atheist, and 27 individuals (or about 2.91% of the population) did not answer the question.

== Education ==
In Unterlangenegg about 55.2% of the population have completed non-mandatory upper secondary education, and 14.5% have completed additional higher education (either university or a Fachhochschule). Of the 85 who had completed some form of tertiary schooling listed in the census, 69.4% were Swiss men, 28.2% were Swiss women.

The Canton of Bern school system provides one year of non-obligatory Kindergarten, followed by six years of Primary school. This is followed by three years of obligatory lower Secondary school where the students are separated according to ability and aptitude. Following the lower Secondary students may attend additional schooling or they may enter an apprenticeship.

During the 2012-13 school year, there were a total of 194 students attending classes in Unterlangenegg. There were a total of 18 students in the German language kindergarten classes in the municipality. The municipality's primary school had 45 students in German language classes. During the same year, the lower secondary school had a total of 131 students, of which 0.8% had a different mother language than the classroom language.

As of 2000, there were a total of 213 students attending any school in the municipality. Of those, 125 both lived and attended school in the municipality, while 88 students came from another municipality. During the same year, 19 residents attended schools outside the municipality.
