= Horrenbach =

Horrenbach may refer to places:

- Horrenbach, part of Krautheim, Germany
- Horrenbach-Buchen, a municipality in Switzerland
