= Wachseldorn =

- Municipality
- Flag Coat of arms
- Location of Wachseldorn
- Location within Switzerland Location within Canton of Bern
- Coordinates: 46°49′N 7°43′E
- Country: Switzerland
- Canton: Bern
- District: Thun

Government
  - Executive: Gemeinderat with 5 members
  - Mayor: Gemeindepräsident; Hans Rüegsegger

Area
  - Total: 3.51 km^{2} (1.36 sq mi)
- Elevation: 990 m (3,250 ft)

Population (Dec 2012)
  - Total: 228
  - Density: 65.0/km^{2} (168/sq mi)
- Time zone: UTC+01:00 (CET)
  - Summer (DST): UTC+02:00 (CEST)
- Postal code: 3618
- SFOS number: 946
- ISO 3166 code: CH-BE
- Surrounded by: Buchholterberg, Oberlangenegg, Röthenbach im Emmental, Unterlangenegg
- Website: http://www.wachseldorn.ch SFSO statistics

Wachseldorn is a municipality in the administrative district of Thun in the canton of Bern in Switzerland.

== History ==
Wachseldorn is first mentioned in 1293 as Wachseldorn.

The farms and land that now make up Wachseldorn were originally part of the Herrschaft of Diessbach. In 1356 it was donated to Interlaken Monastery. Around 1399, the area was administered by the Bernese Röthenbach court. In 1528 Bern adopted the new faith of the Protestant Reformation and suppressed Interlaken Monastery. Whatever claims the monastery still had to Wachseldorn were transferred to Bern after the monastery was closed. In the following year, Wachseldorn became part of the bailiwick of Signau in the district of Konolfingen. In 1864 it was moved to the Thun District. In 1805 the municipalities of Buchholterberg and Wachseldorn-Gützenschwendi merged to form a single municipality. However, the relationship was short lived and following disagreements, they separated into Wachseldorn and Buchholterberg in 1823.

Originally it was part of the large parish of Oberdiessbach. It became part of the parish of Buchholterberg in 1860.

Today about three-quarters of jobs in the municipality are in agriculture, though many residents commute to jobs in or around Thun.

The first school in the municipality was probably built in 1660, though very little is known about that building. The current school sits on the same site as an earlier school from 1832. The current building dates back to 1957. A kindergarten was added in 1980. On 21 March 2011 the town council made the decision to close the school as attendance numbers had dropped. The kindergarten remains open, but primary and secondary students travel to Buchholterberg or Oberlangenegg.

== Geography ==
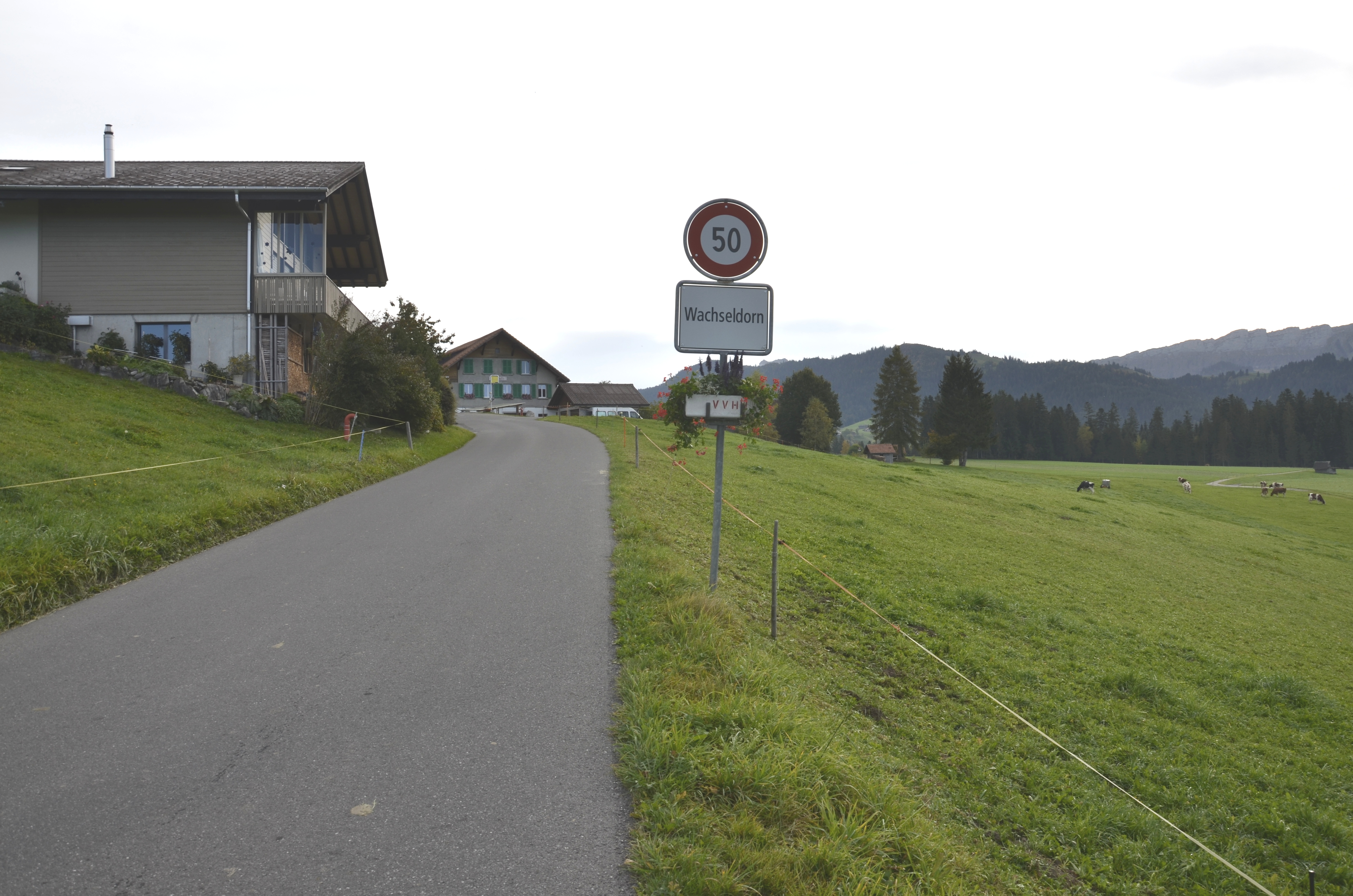
Wachseldorn

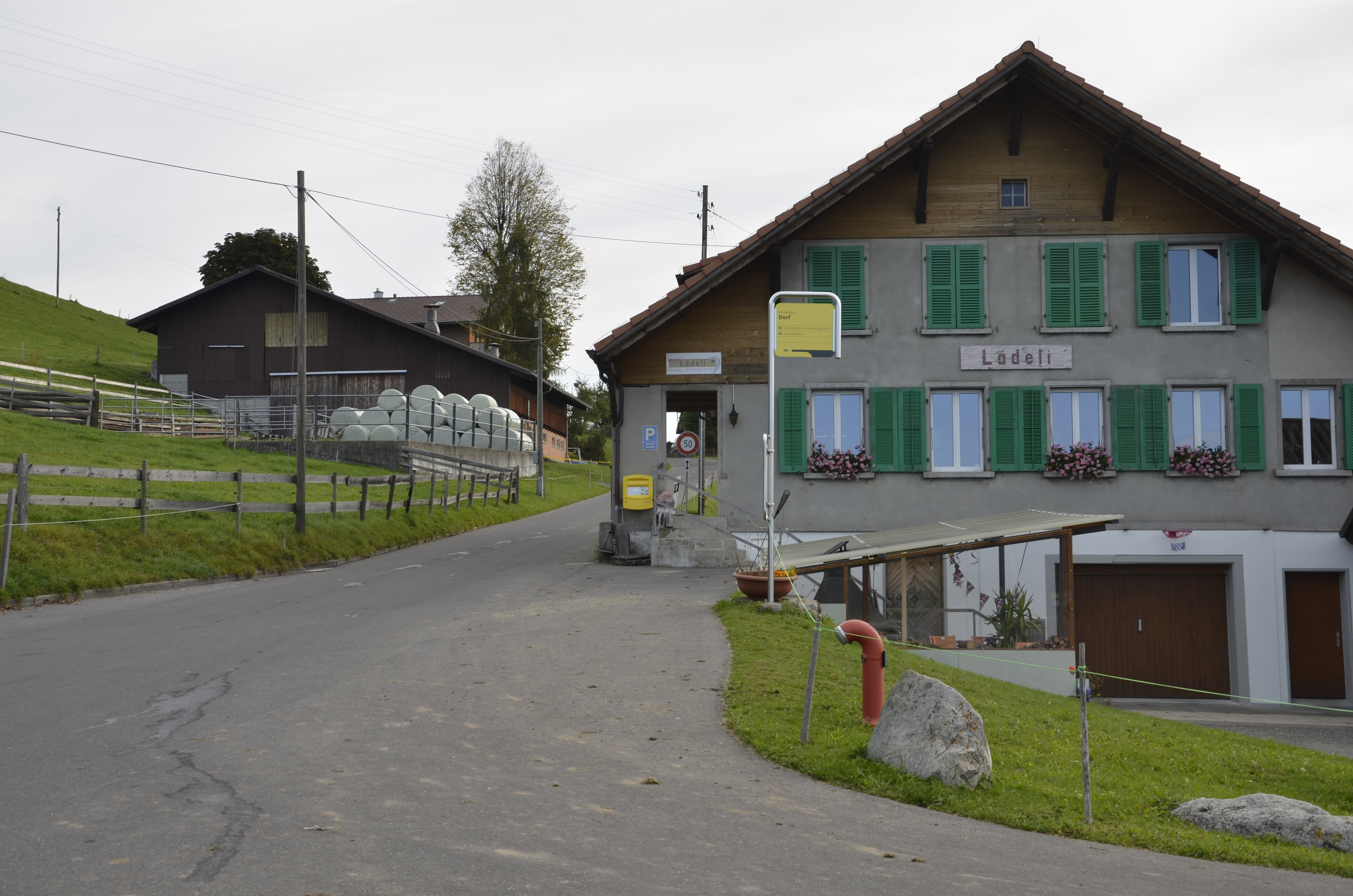
Dorf

Wachseldorn has an area of 3.51 km^{2} (1.36 sq mi). As of the 2006 survey, a total of 2.48 km^{2} (0.96 mi^{2}) or 70.5% is used for agricultural purposes, while 0.87 km^{2} (0.34 mi^{2}) or 24.7% is forested. Of rest of the municipality 0.18 km^{2} (0.069 mi^{2}) or 5.1% is settled (buildings or roads), 0.01 km^{2} (2.5 acres) or 0.3% is either rivers or lakes.

From the same survey, housing and buildings made up 3.7% and transportation infrastructure made up 1.4%. A total of 23.6% of the total land area is heavily forested and 1.1% is covered with orchards or small clusters of trees. Of the agricultural land, 17.9% is used for growing crops and 51.4% is pasturage, while 1.1% is used for orchards or vine crops. All the water in the municipality is flowing water.

The farms and small settlements that make up the municipality are scattered around the Buchholterberg mountain. It consists of the villages of Wachseldorn-Dorf and Süderen.

On 31 December 2009 Amtsbezirk Thun, the municipality's former district, was dissolved. On the following day, 1 January 2010, it joined the newly created Verwaltungskreis Thun.

== Coat of arms ==
The blazon of the municipal coat of arms is Or a Shrub Branch with Thorns Sable and leaved Vert.

== Demographics ==
Wachseldorn has a population (as of December 2020) of 229. As of 2012, 0.9% of the population are resident foreign nationals. Between 2010 and 2012, the population was unchanged. Migration accounted for -2.6%, while births and deaths accounted for -1.8%. All of the population (as of 2000) speaks German as their first language.

As of 2013, the population was 51.9% male and 48.1% female. The population was made up of 123 Swiss men (51.9% of the population) and (0.0%) non-Swiss men. There were 112 Swiss women (47.3%) and 2 (0.8%) non-Swiss women. Of the population in the municipality, 161 or about 57.3% were born in Wachseldorn and lived there in 2000. There were 95 or 33.8% who were born in the same canton, while 13 or 4.6% were born somewhere else in Switzerland, and 1 or 0.4% were born outside of Switzerland.

As of 2012, children and teenagers (0–19 years old) make up 21.1% of the population, while adults (20–64 years old) make up 57.0% and seniors (over 64 years old) make up 21.9%.

As of 2000, there were 123 people who were single and never married in the municipality. There were 139 married individuals, 13 widows or widowers and 6 individuals who are divorced.

As of 2010, there were 25 households that consist of only one person and 10 households with five or more people. In 2000, a total of 81 apartments (89.0% of the total) were permanently occupied, while 6 apartments (6.6%) were seasonally occupied and 4 apartments (4.4%) were empty. As of 2012, the construction rate of new housing units was 4.4 new units per 1000 residents. In 2012, single family homes made up 22.2% of the total housing in the municipality.

The historical population is given in the following chart:

== Economy ==
As of 2011, Wachseldorn had an unemployment rate of 2.58%. As of 2011, there were a total of 78 people employed in the municipality. Of these, there were 53 people employed in the primary economic sector and about 23 businesses involved in this sector. No one was employed in the secondary sector. The tertiary sector employs 25 people, with 12 businesses in this sector. There were 150 residents of the municipality who were employed in some capacity, of which females made up 41.3% of the workforce.

In 2008 there were a total of 56 full-time equivalent jobs. The number of jobs in the primary sector was 39, all of which were in agriculture. There was one manufacturing job in the municipality. The number of jobs in the tertiary sector was 16. In the tertiary sector; 10 or 62.5% were in wholesale or retail sales or the repair of motor vehicles, 2 or 12.5% were in the movement and storage of goods, 3 or 18.8% were in a hotel or restaurant.

In 2000, there were 16 workers who commuted into the municipality and 91 workers who commuted away. The municipality is a net exporter of workers, with about 5.7 workers leaving the municipality for every one entering. A total of 59 workers (78.7% of the 75 total workers in the municipality) both lived and worked in Wachseldorn. Of the working population, 9.3% used public transportation to get to work, and 54% used a private car.

The local and cantonal tax rate in Wachseldorn is one of the lowest in the canton. In 2012 the average local and cantonal tax rate on a married resident, with two children, of Wachseldorn making 150,000 CHF was 12.5%, while an unmarried resident's rate was 18.7%. For comparison, the average rate for the entire canton in 2011, was 14.2% and 22.0%, while the nationwide average was 12.3% and 21.1% respectively.

In 2010 there were a total of 84 tax payers in the municipality. Of that total, 14 made over 75,000 CHF per year. There was one person who made between 15,000 and 20,000 per year. The greatest number of workers, 26, made between 40,000 and 50,000 CHF per year. The average income of the over 75,000 CHF group in Wachseldorn was 87,943 CHF, while the average across all of Switzerland was 131,244 CHF.

In 2011 a total of 2.3% of the population received direct financial assistance from the government.

== Politics ==
In the 2011 federal election the most popular party was the Swiss People's Party (SVP) which received 68.2% of the vote. The next three most popular parties were the Conservative Democratic Party (BDP) (10.4%), the Evangelical People's Party (EVP) (4.7%) and the Green Party (4.6%). In the federal election, a total of 114 votes were cast, and the voter turnout was 61.6%.

== Religion ==
From the 2000 census, 248 or 88.3% belonged to the Swiss Reformed Church, while 9 or 3.2% were Roman Catholic. Of the rest of the population, there were 6 individuals (or about 2.14% of the population) who belonged to another Christian church. 8 (or about 2.85% of the population) belonged to no church, are agnostic or atheist, and 10 individuals (or about 3.56% of the population) did not answer the question.

== Education ==
In Wachseldorn about 47.3% of the population have completed non-mandatory upper secondary education, and 6.9% have completed additional higher education (either university or a Fachhochschule). Of the 10 who had completed some form of tertiary schooling listed in the census, 80.0% were Swiss men, 20.0% were Swiss women.

The Canton of Bern school system provides one year of non-obligatory Kindergarten, followed by six years of Primary school. This is followed by three years of obligatory lower Secondary school where the students are separated according to ability and aptitude. Following the lower Secondary students may attend additional schooling or they may enter an apprenticeship. During the 2012-13 school year, there were a total of 17 students attending kindergarten classes in Wachseldorn. Of the kindergarten students, 11.8% were permanent or temporary residents of Switzerland (not citizens) and had a different mother language than the classroom language.

As of 2000, there were a total of 18 students attending any school in the municipality. Of those, 8 both lived and attended school in the municipality, while 10 students came from another municipality. During the same year, 31 residents attended schools outside the municipality.
