= Eriz =

- Municipality
- Flag Coat of arms
- Location of Eriz
- Location within Switzerland Location within Canton of Bern
- Coordinates: 46°47′N 7°46′E
- Country: Switzerland
- Canton: Bern
- District: Thun

Government
  - Mayor: Daniel Jost

Area
  - Total: 21.80 km^{2} (8.42 sq mi)
- Elevation: 1,005 m (3,297 ft)

Population (Dec 2012)
  - Total: 490
  - Density: 22/km^{2} (58/sq mi)
- Time zone: UTC+01:00 (CET)
  - Summer (DST): UTC+02:00 (CEST)
- Postal code: 3619
- SFOS number: 924
- ISO 3166 code: CH-BE
- Surrounded by: Beatenberg, Habkern, Horrenbach-Buchen, Oberlangenegg, Röthenbach im Emmental, Schangnau, Teuffenthal
- Website: www.eriz.ch

Eriz is a municipality in the administrative district of Thun in the canton of Bern in Switzerland.

== History ==
Eriz is first mentioned in 1320 as Erarze.

The small alpine village was part of the Herrschaft of Heimberg during the Middle Ages. In the 14th century the extensive forests around Eriz were divided between the Counts of Kyburg and the city of Bern. By 1344 the Kyburg-owned high forests in the Zulgtal had been illegally cleared. The first alpine meadows used for herding were mentioned in records in 1335. In 1384, Bern acquired the village and the Kyburg lands. They incorporated the village into the Steffisburg court of the Thun District. In 1834 a part of the municipality, on the left bank of the Eriz river, left Eriz and joined the Horrenbach-Buchen municipality.

Originally the village was part of the Steffisburg parish. In 1693 a parish church was built in Schwarzenegg and Eriz joined the new parish.

Traditionally the residents of the scattered farming villages raised cattle in seasonal alpine camps during the summer and brought them down to the valley floor for winter. In the 17th and 18th centuries, most of the high meadows and cattle herds were acquired by Bernese patricians. By 1800 the local farmers had mostly regained rights to their herds and pastures. In 1848 a large road was built which linked Eriz to Schwarzenegg. In 1864 the government reforested much of the hillside and meadows on Honegg mountain. Today, while dairy farming and cheese production remain a part of the local economy, they have been supplemented by logging, small businesses and tourism.

There are two primary schools in Bieten and Bühl. (The school in Bühl has been closed for many years) Eriz is part of a secondary school district with Unterlangenegg and any secondary students attend classes in the nearby community.

== Geography ==
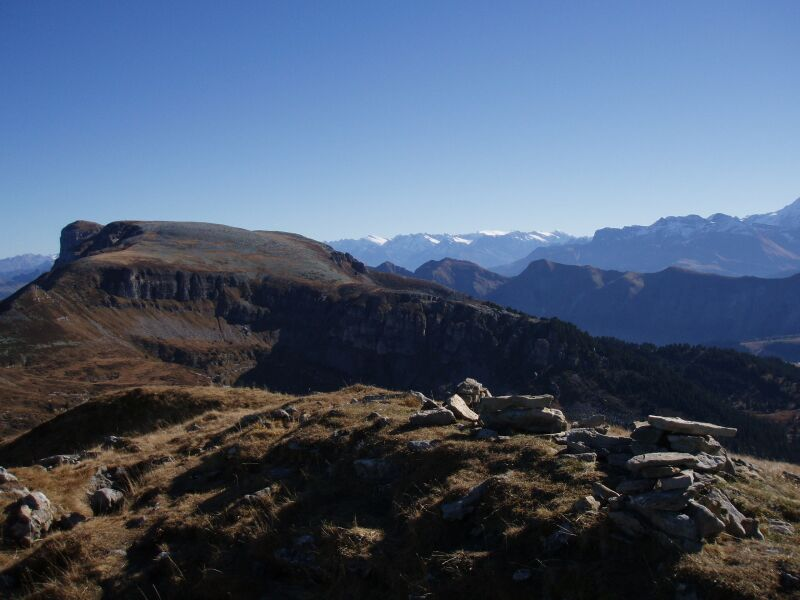
View from Hohgant mountain near Eriz

Eriz has an area of 21.78 km^{2} (8.41 sq mi). As of 2012, a total of 9.86 km^{2} (3.81 mi^{2}) or 45.3% is used for agricultural purposes, while 9.78 km^{2} (3.78 mi^{2}) or 44.9% is forested. The rest of the municipality is 0.6 km^{2} (0.23 mi^{2}) or 2.8% is settled (buildings or roads), 0.13 km^{2} (32 acres) or 0.6% is either rivers or lakes and 1.41 km^{2} (0.54 mi^{2}) or 6.5% is unproductive land.

During the same year, housing and buildings made up 1.5% and transportation infrastructure made up 1.2%. A total of 39.3% of the total land area is heavily forested and 4.6% is covered with orchards or small clusters of trees. Of the agricultural land, 14.8% is pasturage and 30.3% is used for alpine pastures. All the water in the municipality is flowing water. Of the unproductive areas, 4.4% is unproductive vegetation and 2.1% is too rocky for vegetation.

The municipality is scattered around the foothills and valleys of the Alps. It is located north of the Zulg river, on the south flank of the Honegg and west flank of the Hohgant. It is divided into Ausser- and Inner-Eriz. Ausser-Eriz (Outer Eriz) includes Äppenschwendi, Bühl, Kapfern and Losenegg. Inner-Eriz includes Halten, Niedermatt, Linden (also known as Dörfli), Bieten and Scheidzaun. It is part of the parish of Schwarzenegg.

On 31 December 2009 Amtsbezirk Thun, the municipality's former district, was dissolved. On the following day, 1 January 2010, it joined the newly created Verwaltungskreis Thun.

== Coat of arms ==
The blazon of the municipal coat of arms is Gules a Bend wavy Argent and overall a Fir Tree Vert trunked and eradicated or.

== Demographics ==
Eriz has a population (as of December 2020) of 485. As of 2012, 2.9% of the population are resident foreign nationals. Between the last 2 years (2010-2012) the population changed at a rate of -2.0%. Migration accounted for -1.2%, while births and deaths accounted for -0.8%.

Most of the population (as of 2000) speaks German (492 or 98.0%) as their first language, English is the second most common (5 or 1.0%) and Albanian is the third (2 or 0.4%). There is 1 person who speaks Italian.

As of 2008, the population was 50.4% male and 49.6% female. The population was made up of 242 Swiss men (48.4% of the population) and 10 (2.0%) non-Swiss men. There were 243 Swiss women (48.6%) and 5 (1.0%) non-Swiss women. Of the population in the municipality, 305 or about 60.8% were born in Eriz and lived there in 2000. There were 146 or 29.1% who were born in the same canton, while 21 or 4.2% were born somewhere else in Switzerland, and 15 or 3.0% were born outside of Switzerland.

As of 2012, children and teenagers (0–19 years old) make up 21.6% of the population, while adults (20–64 years old) make up 54.9% and seniors (over 64 years old) make up 23.5%.

As of 2000, there were 207 people who were single and never married in the municipality. There were 247 married individuals, 39 widows or widowers and 9 individuals who are divorced.

As of 2010, there were 61 households that consist of only one person and 18 households with five or more people. In 2000, a total of 176 apartments (68.0% of the total) were permanently occupied, while 65 apartments (25.1%) were seasonally occupied and 18 apartments (6.9%) were empty. As of 2012, the construction rate of new housing units was 4.1 new units per 1000 residents. The vacancy rate for the municipality, in 2013, was 1.0%. In 2012, single family homes made up 36.2% of the total housing in the municipality.

The historical population is given in the following chart:

== Economy ==
As of 2011, Eriz had an unemployment rate of 0.23%. As of 2011, there were a total of 184 people employed in the municipality. Of these, there were 110 people employed in the primary economic sector and about 39 businesses involved in this sector. 12 people were employed in the secondary sector and there were 6 businesses in this sector. 62 people were employed in the tertiary sector, with 21 businesses in this sector. There were 253 residents of the municipality who were employed in some capacity, of which females made up 38.3% of the workforce.

In 2008 there were a total of 122 full-time equivalent jobs. The number of jobs in the primary sector was 73, all of which were in agriculture. The number of jobs in the secondary sector was 8 of which 4 or (50.0%) were in manufacturing and 4 (50.0%) were in construction. The number of jobs in the tertiary sector was 41. In the tertiary sector; 2 or 4.9% were in wholesale or retail sales or the repair of motor vehicles, 17 or 41.5% were in the movement and storage of goods, 11 or 26.8% were in a hotel or restaurant, 3 or 7.3% were in the information industry, 4 or 9.8% were in education.

In 2000, there were 14 workers who commuted into the municipality and 126 workers who commuted away. The municipality is a net exporter of workers, with about 9.0 workers leaving the municipality for every one entering. A total of 127 workers (90.1% of the 141 total workers in the municipality) both lived and worked in Eriz. Of the working population, 5.5% used public transportation to get to work, and 55.3% used a private car.

The local and cantonal tax rate in Eriz is one of the lowest in the canton. In 2012 the average local and cantonal tax rate on a married resident, with two children, of Eriz making 150,000 CHF was 12.5%, while an unmarried resident's rate was 18.8%. For comparison, the average rate for the entire canton in 2011, was 14.2% and 22.0%, while the nationwide average was 12.3% and 21.1% respectively.

In 2010 there were a total of 177 tax payers in the municipality. Of that total, 28 made over 75,000 CHF per year. There was one person who made between 15,000 and 20,000 per year. The greatest number of workers, 49, made between 50,000 and 75,000 CHF per year. The average income of the over 75,000 CHF group in Eriz was 98,343 CHF, while the average across all of Switzerland was 131,244 CHF.

In 2011 a total of 1.1% of the population received direct financial assistance from the government.

== Politics ==
In the 2011 federal election the most popular party was the Swiss People's Party (SVP) which received 77.0% of the vote. The next three most popular parties were the Conservative Democratic Party (BDP) (11.6%), the Social Democratic Party (SP) (3.8%) and the Federal Democratic Union of Switzerland (EDU) (1.7%). In the federal election, a total of 233 votes were cast, and the voter turnout was 56.1%.

== Religion ==
From the 2000 census, 438 or 87.3% belonged to the Swiss Reformed Church, while 7 or 1.4% were Roman Catholic. Of the rest of the population, there were 8 individuals (or about 1.59% of the population) who belonged to another Christian church. There were 6 (or about 1.20% of the population) who were Muslim. There were 4 individuals who were Hindu and 1 individual who belonged to another church. 15 (or about 2.99% of the population) belonged to no church, are agnostic or atheist, and 23 individuals (or about 4.58% of the population) did not answer the question.

== Education ==
In Eriz about 49.8% of the population have completed non-mandatory upper secondary education, and 6% have completed additional higher education (either university or a Fachhochschule). Of the 18 who had completed some form of tertiary schooling listed in the census, 77.8% were Swiss men, 16.7% were Swiss women.

The Canton of Bern school system provides one year of non-obligatory Kindergarten, followed by six years of Primary school. This is followed by three years of obligatory lower Secondary school where the students are separated according to ability and aptitude. Following the lower Secondary students may attend additional schooling or they may enter an apprenticeship.

During the 2012-13 school year, there were a total of 48 students attending classes in Eriz. There were a total of 11 students in the German language kindergarten classes and 37 students in primary school classes.

As of 2000, there were a total of 70 students attending any school in the municipality. Of those, 66 both lived and attended school in the municipality, while 4 students came from another municipality. During the same year, 10 residents attended schools outside the municipality.
