= Röthenbach im Emmental =

- Municipality
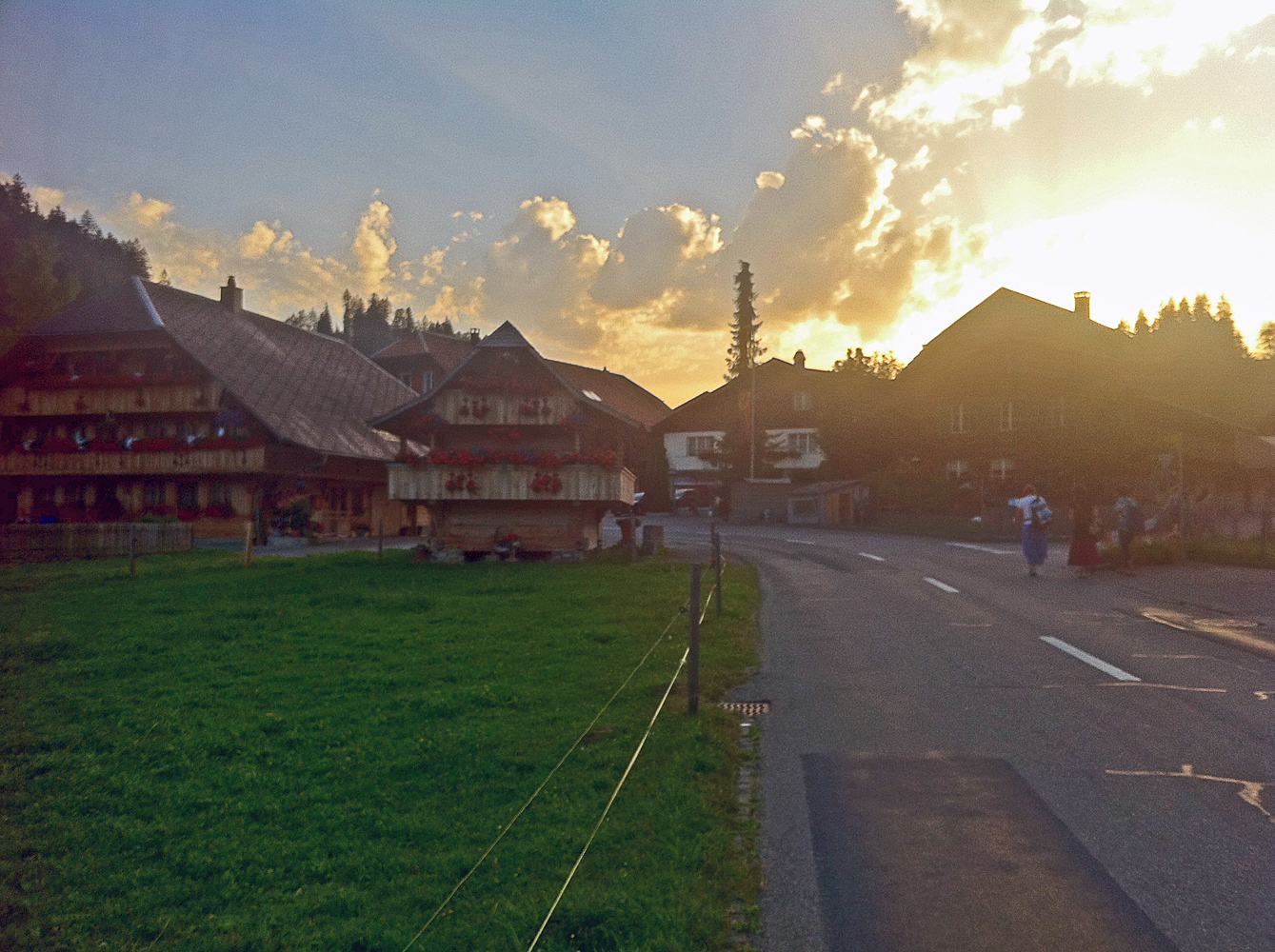
- Röthenbach im Emmental village

- Flag Coat of arms
- Location of Röthenbach im Emmental
- Location within Switzerland Location within Canton of Bern
- Coordinates: 46°51′N 7°44′E
- Country: Switzerland
- Canton: Bern
- District: Emmental

Government
  - Executive: Gemeinderat with 7 members
  - Mayor: Gemeindepräsident(in); Matthias Sommer (as of 2026)

Area
  - Total: 36.8 km^{2} (14.2 sq mi)
- Elevation: 824 m (2,703 ft)

Population (December 2020)
  - Total: 1,169
  - Density: 31.8/km^{2} (82.3/sq mi)
- Time zone: UTC+01:00 (CET)
  - Summer (DST): UTC+02:00 (CEST)
- Postal code: 3538
- SFOS number: 904
- ISO 3166 code: CH-BE
- Localities: Dorf, Gauchern, Oberei
- Surrounded by: Bowil, Buchholterberg, Eggiwil, Eriz, Linden, Oberlangenegg, Schangnau, Signau, Wachseldorn
- Website: www.roethenbach.ch

Röthenbach im Emmental is a municipality in the administrative district of Emmental in the canton of Bern in Switzerland.

== History ==
Röthenbach is first mentioned in 1148 as Rochembac.

The village probably grew up around the Cluniac Röthenbach Priory which was founded before 1148. It was subordinate to Rüeggisberg Priory and was led by a prior who was appointed by Rüeggisberg. By the Late Middle Ages there was a village near the Priory and a parish church above Röthenbach at Würzbrunnen. The prior was the landlord and judge over the villagers and administered the parish and parish church. The church was first mentioned in 1275. In 1399, Bern bought the Herrschaft of Signau which included parts of Röthenbach. The prior retained the low court right over some of the residents of the five settlements near the Priory. The Bernese vogt sat in judgement over the remaining villagers and the further settlements. Rüeggisberg Priory gradually declined and in 1484 both Rüeggisberg and Röthenbach were incorporated into the newly built college of the Augustinian Canons of Bern Minster. In 1494 the Priory church of St. Mary and the parish church of St. Stephen were both damaged in a fire and were quickly rebuilt. In 1528, Bern adopted the new faith of the Protestant Reformation and secularized the monasteries, including Röthenbach Priory. The Priory lands were eventually assigned to the newly created political municipality of Röthenbach. The Priory church was demolished between 1540 and 1558, though it was rebuilt in 1905.

The local economy was traditionally based on raising crops and livestock on the valley floor, raising livestock in seasonal alpine camps and cutting timber. By the 19th century expanding demand for timber and growing alpine meadows led to massive deforestation and flooding. By 1850 the forests on Honegg mountain were almost completely gone. The completion of a road to Schüpbach in 1830 and the Schallenberg Pass road in 1896-1900 connected the village with growing cities and markets around Bern. Today, cattle and dairy farming remain an important part of the economy, along with wood processing and tourism.

== Geography ==
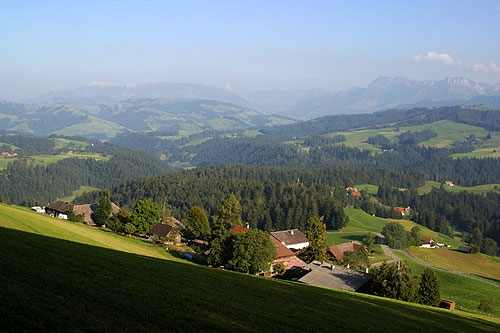
View from the Chuderhüsi observation tower above Würzbrunnen

Aerial view (1954)

Röthenbach im Emmental has an area of 36.8 km^{2} (14.21 sq mi). As of 2012, a total of 16.05 km^{2} (6.20 mi^{2}) or 43.6% is used for agricultural purposes, while 19.34 km^{2} (7.47 mi^{2}) or 52.6% is forested. The rest of the municipality is 1.21 km^{2} (0.47 mi^{2}) or 3.3% is settled (buildings or roads), 0.17 km^{2} (0.066 mi^{2}) or 0.5% is either rivers or lakes and 0.04 km^{2} (9.9 acres) or 0.1% is unproductive land.

During the same year, housing and buildings made up 1.6% and transportation infrastructure made up 1.5%. A total of 50.4% of the total land area is heavily forested and 2.2% is covered with orchards or small clusters of trees. Of the agricultural land, 4.9% is used for growing crops and 27.9% is pasturage and 10.6% is used for alpine pastures. All the water in the municipality is flowing water.

The municipality is located in the Röthenbach valley and includes the core village of Röthenbach which includes the parish church. Also part of the municipality are the hamlets of Ober- and Niederei, and scattered farm houses. The borders also include the 1,546 m (5,072 ft) high Honegg mountain. The municipality is divided into nine sections (Kreise), each of which elect one member of the town council.

On 31 December 2009 Amtsbezirk Signau, the municipality's former district, was dissolved. On the following day, 1 January 2010, it joined the newly created Verwaltungskreis Emmental.

== Coat of arms ==
The blazon of the municipal coat of arms is Argent on a Bend wavy Gules three fishes naiant in bend one and two. The coat of arms is an example of canting arms with the red (German: rot) wavy stripe representing a stream (German: Bach).

== Demographics ==
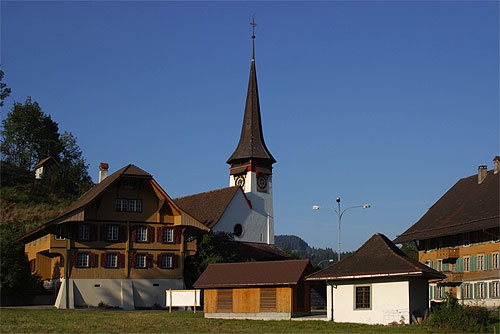
Röthenbach im Emmental, village church

Röthenbach im Emmental has a population (as of December 2020) of 1,169. As of 2012, 1.1% of the population are resident foreign nationals. Between the last 2 years (2010–2012) the population changed at a rate of -2.8%. Migration accounted for -1.6%, while births and deaths accounted for 0.8%.

Most of the population (as of 2000) speaks German (1,247 or 98.8%) as their first language, Macedonian is the second most common (6 or 0.5%) and Serbo-Croatian is the third (3 or 0.2%). There is 1 person who speaks French.

As of 2008, the population was 52.2% male and 47.8% female. The population was made up of 652 Swiss men (51.1% of the population) and 14 (1.1%) non-Swiss men. There were 602 Swiss women (47.1%) and 9 (0.7%) non-Swiss women. Of the population in the municipality, 746 or about 59.1% were born in Röthenbach im Emmental and lived there in 2000. There were 394 or 31.2% who were born in the same canton, while 45 or 3.6% were born somewhere else in Switzerland, and 19 or 1.5% were born outside of Switzerland.

As of 2012, children and teenagers (0–19 years old) make up 25.3% of the population, while adults (20–64 years old) make up 56.8% and seniors (over 64 years old) make up 17.9%.

As of 2000, there were 576 people who were single and never married in the municipality. There were 587 married individuals, 79 widows or widowers and 20 individuals who are divorced.

As of 2010, there were 96 households that consist of only one person and 80 households with five or more people. In 2000, a total of 399 apartments (85.4% of the total) were permanently occupied, while 39 apartments (8.4%) were seasonally occupied and 29 apartments (6.2%) were empty. In 2011, single family homes made up 25.8% of the total housing in the municipality.

The historical population is given in the following chart:

== Economy ==
As of 2011, Röthenbach im Emmental had an unemployment rate of 1.45%. As of 2011, there were a total of 586 people employed in the municipality. Of these, there were 343 people employed in the primary economic sector and about 111 businesses involved in this sector. 64 people were employed in the secondary sector and there were 15 businesses in this sector. 179 people were employed in the tertiary sector, with 58 businesses in this sector. There were 627 residents of the municipality who were employed in some capacity, of which females made up 37.0% of the workforce.

In 2008 there were a total of 410 full-time equivalent jobs. The number of jobs in the primary sector was 223, all of which were in agriculture. The number of jobs in the secondary sector was 59 of which 17 or (28.8%) were in manufacturing and 41 (69.5%) were in construction. The number of jobs in the tertiary sector was 128. In the tertiary sector; 60 or 46.9% were in wholesale or retail sales or the repair of motor vehicles, 10 or 7.8% were in the movement and storage of goods, 23 or 18.0% were in a hotel or restaurant, 2 or 1.6% were in the information industry, 5 or 3.9% were the insurance or financial industry, 3 or 2.3% were technical professionals or scientists, 13 or 10.2% were in education.

In 2000, there were 60 workers who commuted into the municipality and 304 workers who commuted away. The municipality is a net exporter of workers, with about 5.1 workers leaving the municipality for every one entering. A total of 323 workers (84.3% of the 383 total workers in the municipality) both lived and worked in Röthenbach im Emmental. Of the working population, 6.2% used public transportation to get to work, and 51.2% used a private car.

In 2011 the average local and cantonal tax rate on a married resident, with two children, of Röthenbach im Emmental making 150,000 CHF was 13.1%, while an unmarried resident's rate was 19.3%. For comparison, the average rate for the entire canton in the same year, was 14.2% and 22.0%, while the nationwide average was 12.3% and 21.1% respectively.

In 2009 there were a total of 428 tax payers in the municipality. Of that total, 88 made over 75,000 CHF per year. There were 12 people who made between 15,000 and 20,000 per year. The greatest number of workers, 109, made between 50,000 and 75,000 CHF per year. The average income of the over 75,000 CHF group in Röthenbach im Emmental was 101,147 CHF, while the average across all of Switzerland was 130,478 CHF.

In 2011 a total of 3.1% of the population received direct financial assistance from the government.

== Heritage sites of national significance ==
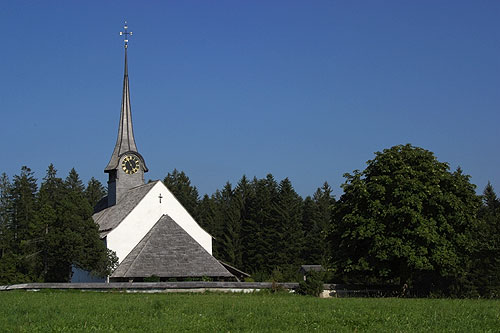
Church of Würzbrunnen

The Alp Gabelspitz and Church of Würzbrunnen are listed as Swiss heritage site of national significance.

== Politics ==
In the 2011 federal election the most popular party was the Swiss People's Party (SVP) which received 65.0% of the vote. The next three most popular parties were the Conservative Democratic Party (BDP) (11.5%), the Federal Democratic Union of Switzerland (EDU) (9.0%) and the Evangelical People's Party (EVP) (3.6%). In the federal election, a total of 508 votes were cast, and the voter turnout was 50.9%.

== Religion ==
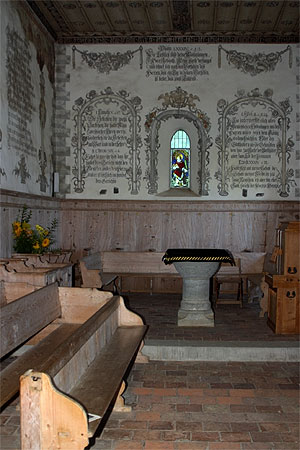
Choir and baptismal font in the village church at Würzbrunnen

From the 2000 census, 1,079 or 85.5% belonged to the Swiss Reformed Church, while 23 or 1.8% were Roman Catholic. Of the rest of the population, there were 4 members of an Orthodox church (or about 0.32% of the population), and there were 49 individuals (or about 3.88% of the population) who belonged to another Christian church. There were 7 (or about 0.55% of the population) who were Muslim. 42 (or about 3.33% of the population) belonged to no church, are agnostic or atheist, and 58 individuals (or about 4.60% of the population) did not answer the question.

== Education ==
In Röthenbach im Emmental about 52.4% of the population have completed non-mandatory upper secondary education, and 7.1% have completed additional higher education (either university or a Fachhochschule). Of the 50 who had completed some form of tertiary schooling listed in the census, 78.0% were Swiss men, 20.0% were Swiss women.

The Canton of Bern school system provides one year of non-obligatory Kindergarten, followed by six years of Primary school. This is followed by three years of obligatory lower Secondary school where the students are separated according to ability and aptitude. Following the lower Secondary students may attend additional schooling or they may enter an apprenticeship.

During the 2011–12 school year, there were a total of 133 students attending classes in Röthenbach im Emmental. There was one kindergarten class with a total of 9 students in the municipality. The municipality had 5 primary classes and 84 students. Of the primary students, 1.2% were permanent or temporary residents of Switzerland (not citizens) and 1.2% have a different mother language than the classroom language. During the same year, there were 2 lower secondary classes with a total of 40 students. 2.5% have a different mother language than the classroom language.

As of 2000, there were a total of 162 students attending any school in the municipality. Of those, 133 both lived and attended school in the municipality, while 29 students came from another municipality. During the same year, 55 residents attended schools outside the municipality.

== See also ==
- Kirche Würzbrunnen
- Aussichtsturm Gauchern
