= Homberg, Bern =

Homberg
- Municipality
- Flag Coat of arms
- Location of Homberg
- Location within Switzerland Location within Canton of Bern
- Coordinates: 46°46′N 7°40′E
- Country: Switzerland
- Canton: Bern
- District: Thun

Government
  - Mayor: Philipp Sommer

Area
  - Total: 6.52 km^{2} (2.52 sq mi)
- Elevation: 941 m (3,087 ft)

Population (Dec 2012)
  - Total: 509
  - Density: 78.1/km^{2} (202/sq mi)
- Time zone: UTC+01:00 (CET)
  - Summer (DST): UTC+02:00 (CEST)
- Postal code: 3622
- SFOS number: 931
- ISO 3166 code: CH-BE
- Surrounded by: Fahrni, Heiligenschwendi, Horrenbach-Buchen, Schwendibach, Steffisburg, Teuffenthal, Thun, Unterlangenegg
- Website: www.homberg.ch

Homberg (Swiss Standard German pronunciation: [ˈhɔmbɛrɡ]) is a municipality in the administrative district of Thun in the canton of Bern in Switzerland.

== History ==
Originally the small farming villages that make up Homberg were part of the Herrschaft of Heimberg under the House of Kyburg. After a failed raid on Solothurn on 11 November 1382 and the resulting Burgdorferkrieg, the Kyburgs lost most of their lands, including Homberg, to Bern in 1384. Under Bernese rule it was part of the Steffisburg court under the Thun District. Religiously it was part of the parish of Steffisburg until 1936 when it joined the Buchen parish.

Traditionally the farmers of the villages practiced seasonal alpine herding with limited farming on the high valley floor. During the 18th and 19th centuries there was a small pottery industry in the municipality. In the late 20th and into the 21st centuries many of the residents commuted to jobs in Thun, while many of the remainder worked in tourism.

The municipality has both a primary and secondary school which are located in three school houses.

== Geography ==
Homberg has an area of 6.51 km^{2} (2.51 sq mi). As of 2012, a total of 4.11 km^{2} (1.59 mi^{2}) or 63.2% is used for agricultural purposes, while 2.08 km^{2} (0.80 mi^{2}) or 32.0% is forested. The rest of the municipality is 0.28 km^{2} (0.11 mi^{2}) or 4.3% is settled (buildings or roads) and 0.01 km^{2} (2.5 acres) or 0.2% is unproductive land.

During the same year, housing and buildings made up 2.8% and transportation infrastructure made up 1.2%. A total of 30.6% of the total land area is heavily forested and 1.4% is covered with orchards or small clusters of trees. Of the agricultural land, 15.5% is used for growing crops and 46.0% is pasturage, while 1.7% is used for orchards or vine crops.

The municipality is located on the left side of the Zulg valley. It includes the hamlets of Dreiligass, Enzenbühl, Huckhaus and Fuhren along with scattered farm houses.

On 31 December 2009 Amtsbezirk Thun, the municipality's former district, was dissolved. On the following day, 1 January 2010, it joined the newly created Verwaltungskreis Thun.

== Coat of arms ==
The blazon of the municipal coat of arms is Gules a Tower roofed Argent issuant from a Mount of six Coupeaux Vert between two Mullets Or.

== Demographics ==
Homberg has a population (as of December 2020) of 510. As of 2012, 1.8% of the population are resident foreign nationals. Between the last 2 years (2010-2012) the population changed at a rate of 1.8%. Migration accounted for 1.4%, while births and deaths accounted for 0.4%.

Most of the population (as of 2000) speaks German (472 or 97.3%) as their first language, Albanian is the second most common (5 or 1.0%) and Serbo-Croatian is the third (3 or 0.6%). There is 1 person who speaks French, 1 person who speaks Italian and 2 people who speak Romansh.

As of 2008, the population was 48.2% male and 51.8% female. The population was made up of 240 Swiss men (48.0% of the population) and 1 (0.2%) non-Swiss men. There were 255 Swiss women (51.0%) and 4 (0.8%) non-Swiss women. Of the population in the municipality, 245 or about 50.5% were born in Homberg and lived there in 2000. There were 189 or 39.0% who were born in the same canton, while 29 or 6.0% were born somewhere else in Switzerland, and 21 or 4.3% were born outside of Switzerland.

As of 2012, children and teenagers (0–19 years old) make up 28.1% of the population, while adults (20–64 years old) make up 55.8% and seniors (over 64 years old) make up 16.1%.

As of 2000, there were 198 people who were single and never married in the municipality. There were 253 married individuals, 27 widows or widowers and 7 individuals who are divorced.

As of 2010, there were 58 households that consist of only one person and 25 households with five or more people. In 2000, a total of 171 apartments (91.9% of the total) were permanently occupied, while 5 apartments (2.7%) were seasonally occupied and 10 apartments (5.4%) were empty. As of 2012, the construction rate of new housing units was 2.0 new units per 1000 residents. The vacancy rate for the municipality, in 2013, was 0.5%. In 2012, single family homes made up 32.6% of the total housing in the municipality.

The historical population is given in the following chart:

== Economy ==
As of 2011, Homberg had an unemployment rate of 0.73%. As of 2011, there were a total of 174 people employed in the municipality. Of these, there were 87 people employed in the primary economic sector and about 35 businesses involved in this sector. The secondary sector employs 26 people and there were 9 businesses in this sector. The tertiary sector employs 60 people, with 15 businesses in this sector. There were 245 residents of the municipality who were employed in some capacity, of which females made up 40.4% of the workforce.

In 2008 there were a total of 97 full-time equivalent jobs. The number of jobs in the primary sector was 55, all of which were in agriculture. The number of jobs in the secondary sector was 17 of which 12 or (70.6%) were in manufacturing and 5 (29.4%) were in construction. The number of jobs in the tertiary sector was 25. In the tertiary sector; 3 or 12.0% were in wholesale or retail sales or the repair of motor vehicles, 1 was in the information industry, 1 was a technical professional or scientist, 8 or 32.0% were in education and 8 or 32.0% were in health care.

In 2000, there were 22 workers who commuted into the municipality and 140 workers who commuted away. The municipality is a net exporter of workers, with about 6.4 workers leaving the municipality for every one entering. A total of 105 workers (82.7% of the 127 total workers in the municipality) both lived and worked in Homberg. Of the working population, 6.9% used public transportation to get to work, and 49% used a private car.

The local and cantonal tax rate in Homberg is one of the lowest in the canton. In 2012 the average local and cantonal tax rate on a married resident, with two children, of Homberg making 150,000 CHF was 12.6%, while an unmarried resident's rate was 18.9%. For comparison, the average rate for the entire canton in 2011, was 14.2% and 22.0%, while the nationwide average was 12.3% and 21.1% respectively.

In 2010 there were a total of 194 tax payers in the municipality. Of that total, 51 made over 75,000 CHF per year. There were 3 people who made between 15,000 and 20,000 per year. The average income of the over 75,000 CHF group in Homberg was 110,976 CHF, while the average across all of Switzerland was 131,244 CHF.

In 2011 a total of 1.2% of the population received direct financial assistance from the government.

== Politics ==
In the 2011 federal election the most popular party was the Swiss People's Party (SVP) which received 56.2% of the vote. The next three most popular parties were the Federal Democratic Union of Switzerland (EDU) (12.3%), the Conservative Democratic Party (BDP) (11.4%) and the Evangelical People's Party (EVP) (4.9%). In the federal election, a total of 227 votes were cast, and the voter turnout was 59.6%.

== Religion ==
From the 2000 census, 380 or 78.4% belonged to the Swiss Reformed Church, while 14 or 2.9% were Roman Catholic. Of the rest of the population, there were 5 members of an Orthodox church (or about 1.03% of the population), and there were 57 individuals (or about 11.75% of the population) who belonged to another Christian church. There were 5 (or about 1.03% of the population) who were Muslim. There was 1 person who was Buddhist and 1 individual who belonged to another church. 21 (or about 4.33% of the population) belonged to no church, are agnostic or atheist, and 1 individuals (or about 0.21% of the population) did not answer the question.

== Education ==
In Homberg about 56.7% of the population have completed non-mandatory upper secondary education, and 13.4% have completed additional higher education (either university or a Fachhochschule). Of the 34 who had completed some form of tertiary schooling listed in the census, 76.5% were Swiss men, 14.7% were Swiss women.

The Canton of Bern school system provides one year of non-obligatory Kindergarten, followed by six years of Primary school. This is followed by three years of obligatory lower Secondary school where the students are separated according to ability and aptitude. Following the lower Secondary students may attend additional schooling or they may enter an apprenticeship.

During the 2012-13 school year, there were a total of 152 students attending classes in Homberg. There were a total of 21 students in the German language kindergarten classes in the municipality. Of the kindergarten students, 4.8% have a different mother language than the classroom language. The municipality's primary school had 94 students in German language classes. Of the primary students, 1.1% have a different mother language than the classroom language. During the same year, the lower secondary school had a total of 37 students.

As of 2000, there were a total of 64 students attending any school in the municipality. Of those, 63 both lived and attended school in the municipality, while one student came from another municipality. During the same year, 8 residents attended schools outside the municipality.

== Notable residents ==
Swiss-Bulgarian sports pedagogue Louis-Emil Eyer was born in Homberg.
