= Buchholterberg =

- Municipality
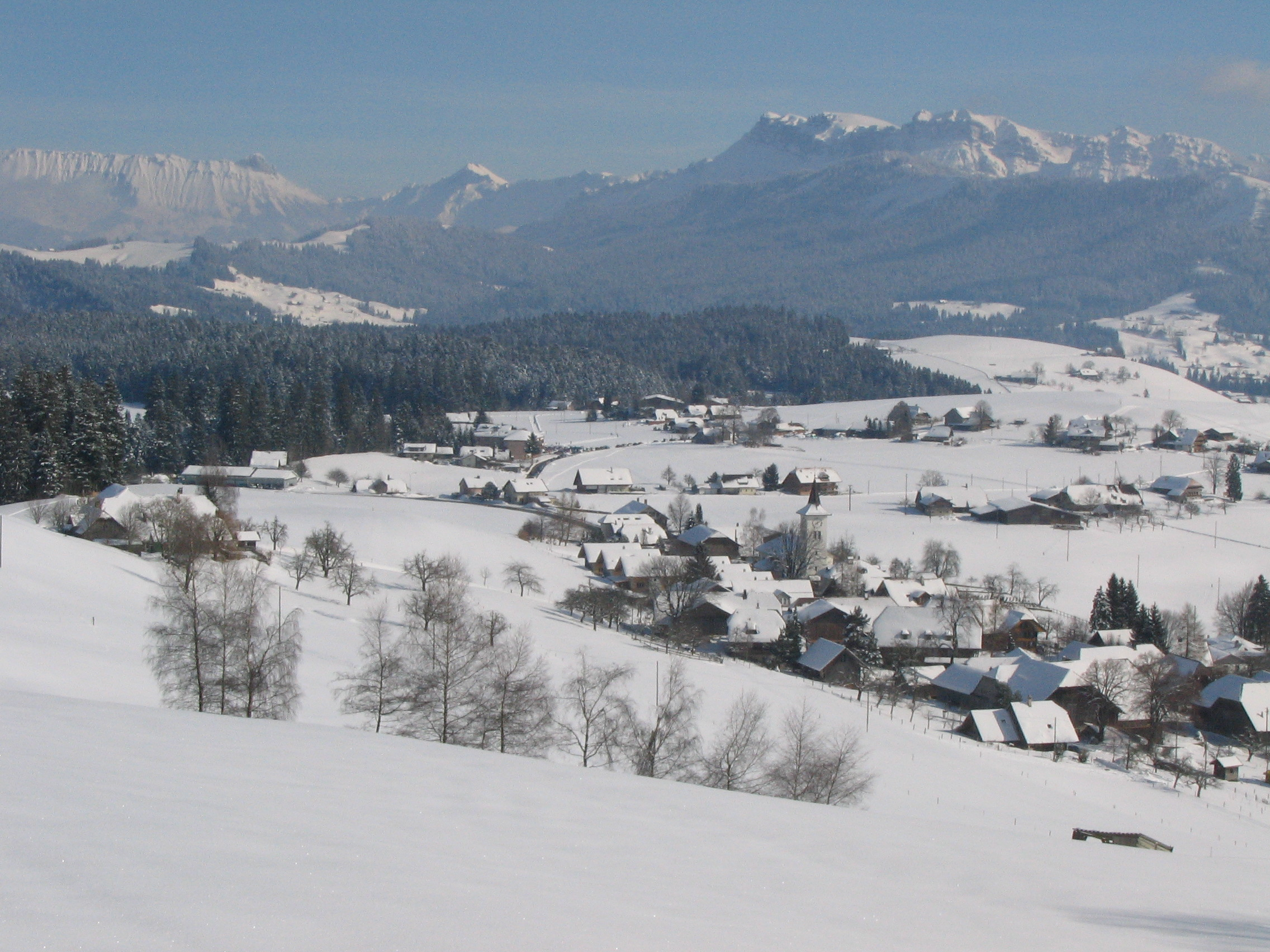

- Flag Coat of arms
- Location of Buchholterberg
- Location within Switzerland Location within Canton of Bern
- Coordinates: 46°49′N 7°41′E
- Country: Switzerland
- Canton: Bern
- District: Thun

Government
  - Mayor: Beat Haldimann

Area
  - Total: 15.34 km^{2} (5.92 sq mi)
- Elevation: 1,006 m (3,301 ft)

Population (Dec 2012)
  - Total: 1,542
  - Density: 100.5/km^{2} (260.3/sq mi)
- Time zone: UTC+01:00 (CET)
  - Summer (DST): UTC+02:00 (CEST)
- Postal code: 3615
- SFOS number: 923
- ISO 3166 code: CH-BE
- Surrounded by: Aeschlen, Bleiken bei Oberdiessbach, Fahrni, Linden, Röthenbach im Emmental, Unterlangenegg, Wachseldorn
- Website: www.buchholterberg.ch

Buchholterberg is a municipality in the administrative district of Thun in the canton of Bern in Switzerland.

== History ==
Buchholterberg is first mentioned in 1268 as Bucholtron.

The municipality was gradually settled as farmers moved out from other villages into the villages that would make up Buchholterberg. By 1257 Graf Ulrich von Buchegg was mentioned as owning some property in the villages. Other Bernese patricians also held lands in the area. In 1399, the entire area was acquired by the city of Bern and added to the Röthenbach District. It was later assigned to the Landvogtei of Signau and then the Konolfingen District before joining the Thun District in 1864. Originally Buchholterberg, Wachseldorn, Süderen and Bleiken were all combined into the Buchholterberg-third of the parish of Oberdiessbach. In 1805 parts of Buchholterberg and Wachseldorn-Gützenschwendi merged to form a political municipality and a parish. However, in 1823, they separated into two political municipalities (Buchholterberg and Wachseldorn), but remained a combined parish under Oberdiessbach. In 1860 the independent Buchholterberg parish was created, which included all the municipality along with Wachseldorn.

Traditionally the local residents practiced seasonal alpine herding where they raised cattle in high meadows during the summer and over wintered on the valley floor. Only a limited number of crops were grown on the valley floor. In 1857-68 a road was built linking the municipality with Steffisburg and the rest of the Aare river valley. Other roads eventually connected it to Oberdiessbach and the upper Emmental and a PostBus bus route now connects the municipality to Thun. However, the large, sparsely settled municipality remains very rural and agrarian. In 1990 over half of the residents commuted to jobs in nearby cities and many of the remaining workers were employed in dairy farming.

There are three primary schools in the municipality, Badhaus, Wangelen and Bruchbühl. The school house in Bruchbühl was built on the site of the first school in the municipality, which opened in 1699. Secondary students travel to the secondary schools in Oberdiessbach or Unterlangenegg.

== Geography ==
Buchholterberg has an area of 15.33 km^{2} (5.92 sq mi). As of 2012, a total of 8.82 km^{2} (3.41 mi^{2}) or 57.6% is used for agricultural purposes, while 5.34 km^{2} (2.06 mi^{2}) or 34.9% is forested. The rest of the municipality is 0.96 km^{2} (0.37 mi^{2}) or 6.3% is settled (buildings or roads), 0.04 km^{2} (9.9 acres) or 0.3% is either rivers or lakes and 0.11 km^{2} (27 acres) or 0.7% is unproductive land.

During the same year, housing and buildings made up 3.6% and transportation infrastructure made up 2.3%. All of the forested land area is covered with heavy forests. Of the agricultural land, 19.6% is used for growing crops and 36.4% is pasturage, while 1.6% is used for orchards or vine crops. All the water in the municipality is flowing water.

The municipality is located in the hills north-east of Thun, near Rothachen canyon (Rothachenschlucht). It includes the village of Heimenschwand, the regions known as Obere Allmendgemeinde, Untere Allmendgemeinde and the new developments of Heimenegg, Höh and Längmatt. Obere Allmendgemeinde includes part of Heimenschwand, Zihl and Bätterich. Untere Allmendgemeinde has the rest of Heimenschwand, Marbach, Schaubhaus, Badhaus, Ibach, Wangelen, Teufenbach, Wyler and Rothachen.

On 31 December 2009 Amtsbezirk Thun, the municipality's former district, was dissolved. On the following day, 1 January 2010, it joined the newly created Verwaltungskreis Thun.

== Coat of arms ==
The blazon of the municipal coat of arms is Gules a Base vert and overall a Beech tree eradicated Argent and leaved of the second.

== Demographics ==
Buchholterberg has a population (as of December 2020) of 1,519. As of 2012, 3.6% of the population are resident foreign nationals. Between the last 2 years (2010-2012) the population changed at a rate of 1.4%. Migration accounted for 1.0%, while births and deaths accounted for 0.2%.

Most of the population (as of 2000) speaks German (1,457 or 98.9%) as their first language, Albanian is the second most common (5 or 0.3%) and French is the third (3 or 0.2%). There are 2 people who speak Italian.

As of 2008, the population was 49.1% male and 50.9% female. The population was made up of 727 Swiss men (47.8% of the population) and 19 (1.3%) non-Swiss men. There were 754 Swiss women (49.6%) and 20 (1.3%) non-Swiss women. Of the population in the municipality, 723 or about 49.1% were born in Buchholterberg and lived there in 2000. There were 542 or 36.8% who were born in the same canton, while 89 or 6.0% were born somewhere else in Switzerland, and 28 or 1.9% were born outside of Switzerland.

As of 2012, children and teenagers (0–19 years old) make up 22.6% of the population, while adults (20–64 years old) make up 60.0% and seniors (over 64 years old) make up 17.4%.

As of 2000, there were 661 people who were single and never married in the municipality. There were 683 married individuals, 96 widows or widowers and 33 individuals who are divorced.

As of 2010, there were 157 households that consist of only one person and 53 households with five or more people. In 2000, a total of 514 apartments (85.7% of the total) were permanently occupied, while 61 apartments (10.2%) were seasonally occupied and 25 apartments (4.2%) were empty. As of 2012, the construction rate of new housing units was 2.6 new units per 1000 residents. The vacancy rate for the municipality, in 2013, was 0.7%. In 2012, single family homes made up 33.9% of the total housing in the municipality.

The historical population is given in the following chart:

== Economy ==
As of 2011, Buchholterberg had an unemployment rate of 0.59%. As of 2011, there were a total of 521 people employed in the municipality. Of these, there were 206 people employed in the primary economic sector and about 82 businesses involved in this sector. 71 people were employed in the secondary sector and there were 23 businesses in this sector. 243 people were employed in the tertiary sector, with 61 businesses in this sector. There were 730 residents of the municipality who were employed in some capacity, of which females made up 40.4% of the workforce.

In 2008 there were a total of 330 full-time equivalent jobs. The number of jobs in the primary sector was 124, all of which were in agriculture. The number of jobs in the secondary sector was 74 of which 17 or (23.0%) were in manufacturing and 57 (77.0%) were in construction. The number of jobs in the tertiary sector was 132. In the tertiary sector; 28 or 21.2% were in wholesale or retail sales or the repair of motor vehicles, 7 or 5.3% were in the movement and storage of goods, 8 or 6.1% were in a hotel or restaurant, 8 or 6.1% were in the information industry, 2 or 1.5% were the insurance or financial industry, 23 or 17.4% were technical professionals or scientists, 13 or 9.8% were in education and 27 or 20.5% were in health care.

In 2000, there were 100 workers who commuted into the municipality and 442 workers who commuted away. The municipality is a net exporter of workers, with about 4.4 workers leaving the municipality for every one entering. A total of 288 workers (74.2% of the 388 total workers in the municipality) both lived and worked in Buchholterberg. Of the working population, 10.1% used public transportation to get to work, and 58.5% used a private car.

The local and cantonal tax rate in Buchholterberg is one of the lowest in the canton. In 2012 the average local and cantonal tax rate on a married resident, with two children, of Buchholterberg making 150,000 CHF was 12.1%, while an unmarried resident's rate was 18.1%. For comparison, the average rate for the entire canton in 2011, was 14.2% and 22.0%, while the nationwide average was 12.3% and 21.1% respectively.

In 2010 there were a total of 642 tax payers in the municipality. Of that total, 158 made over 75,000 CHF per year. There were 5 people who made between 15,000 and 20,000 per year. The greatest number of workers, 186, made between 50,000 and 75,000 CHF per year. The average income of the over 75,000 CHF group in Buchholterberg was 114,296 CHF, while the average across all of Switzerland was 131,244 CHF.

In 2011 a total of 1.6% of the population received direct financial assistance from the government.

== Politics ==
In the 2011 federal election the most popular party was the Swiss People's Party (SVP) which received 53.7% of the vote. The next three most popular parties were the Conservative Democratic Party (BDP) (11.7%), the Federal Democratic Union of Switzerland (EDU) (9.8%) and the Social Democratic Party (SP) (5.3%). In the federal election, a total of 659 votes were cast, and the voter turnout was 52.7%.

== Religion ==
From the 2000 census, 1,175 or 79.8% belonged to the Swiss Reformed Church, while 37 or 2.5% were Roman Catholic. Of the rest of the population, there was 1 member of an Orthodox church, and there were 126 individuals (or about 8.55% of the population) who belonged to another Christian church. There were 8 (or about 0.54% of the population) who were Muslim. There was 1 person who was Hindu. 38 (or about 2.58% of the population) belonged to no church, are agnostic or atheist, and 87 individuals (or about 5.91% of the population) did not answer the question.

== Education ==
In Buchholterberg about 56% of the population have completed non-mandatory upper secondary education, and 11.5% have completed additional higher education (either university or a Fachhochschule). Of the 93 who had completed some form of tertiary schooling listed in the census, 75.3% were Swiss men, 20.4% were Swiss women.

The Canton of Bern school system provides one year of non-obligatory Kindergarten, followed by six years of Primary school. This is followed by three years of obligatory lower Secondary school where the students are separated according to ability and aptitude. Following the lower Secondary students may attend additional schooling or they may enter an apprenticeship.

During the 2012–13 school year, there were a total of 155 students attending classes in Buchholterberg. There were a total of 23 students in the German language kindergarten classes in the municipality. Of the kindergarten students, 8.7% were permanent or temporary residents of Switzerland (not citizens) and have a different mother language than the classroom language. The municipality's primary school had 99 students in German language classes. Of the primary students, 3.0% were permanent or temporary residents of Switzerland (not citizens) and 1.0% have a different mother language than the classroom language. During the same year, the lower secondary schools in neighboring municipalities had a total of 33 students from Bucholterberg. There were 6.1% who were permanent or temporary residents of Switzerland (not citizens) and 3.0% have a different mother language than the classroom language.

As of 2000, there were a total of 177 students attending any school in the municipality. Of those, 172 both lived and attended school in the municipality, while 5 students came from another municipality. During the same year, 65 residents attended schools outside the municipality.
