= Chuderhüsi Tower =

Observation tower in Rötenbachim Emmental, Switzerland

Coordinates: 46°52′6.36″N 7°43′7.18″E

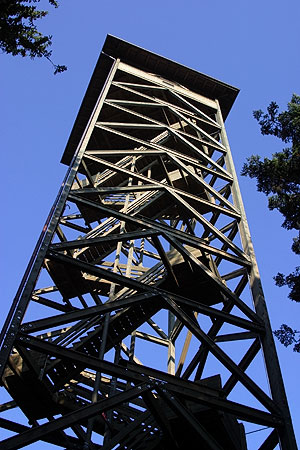

Chuderhüsi Tower (or "Aussichtsturm Gauchern") is a 42-metre observation tower built of wood at Röthenbach im Emmental, Switzerland. The tower was built in 1998, burnt down in 2001 and was rebuilt in 2002.
