= Schangnau =

- Municipality
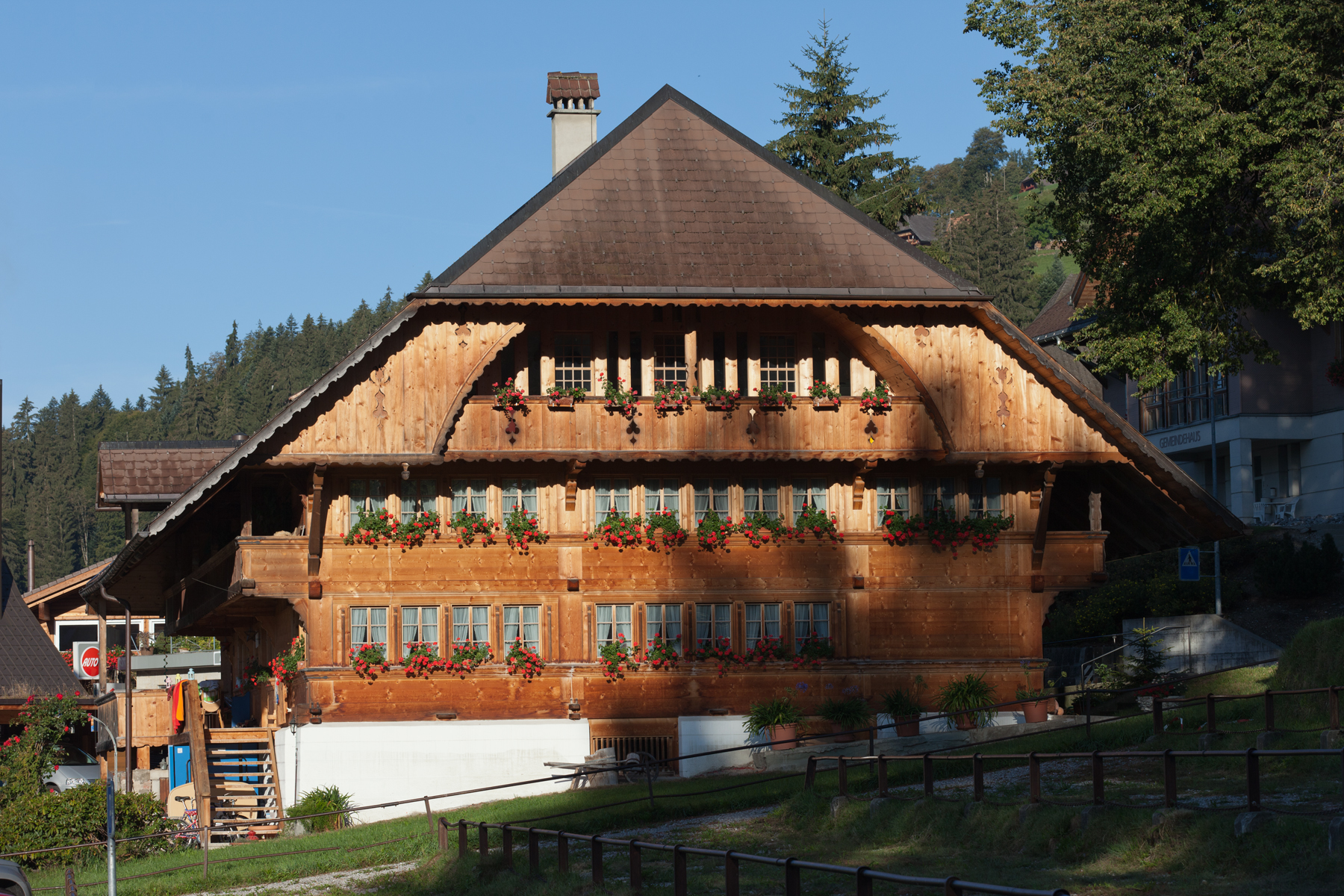

- Flag Coat of arms
- Location of Schangnau
- Location within Switzerland Location within Canton of Bern
- Coordinates: 46°49′N 7°51′E
- Country: Switzerland
- Canton: Bern
- District: Emmental

Government
  - Executive: Gemeinderat
  - Mayor: Gemeindepräsident(in); Stefan Gfeller (as of 2026)

Area
  - Total: 36.5 km^{2} (14.1 sq mi)
- Elevation: 630 m (2,070 ft)

Population (December 2020)
  - Total: 918
  - Density: 25.2/km^{2} (65.1/sq mi)
- Time zone: UTC+01:00 (CET)
  - Summer (DST): UTC+02:00 (CEST)
- Postal code: 6197
- SFOS number: 906
- ISO 3166 code: CH-BE
- Surrounded by: Eggiwil, Eriz, Flühli (LU), Habkern, Marbach (LU), Röthenbach im Emmental
- Website: www.schangnau.ch

Schangnau is a municipality in the administrative district of Emmental in the canton of Bern in Switzerland.

== History ==
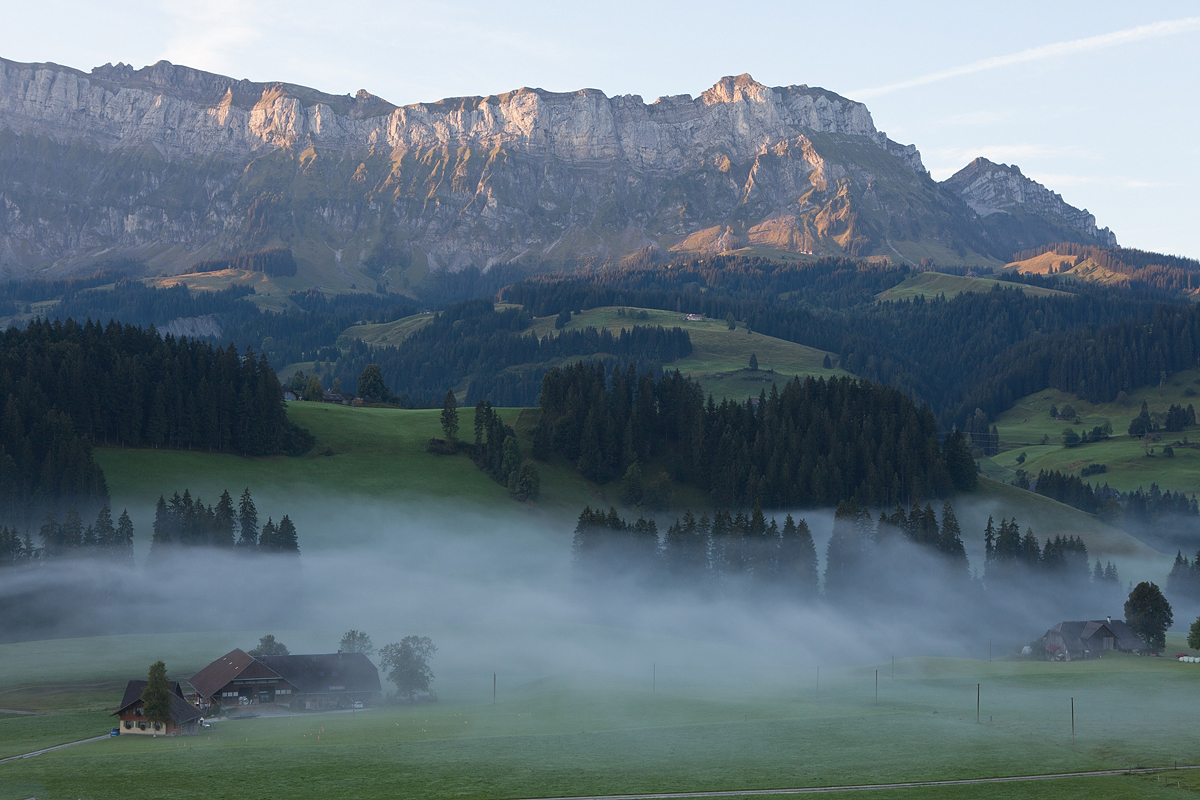
Schangnau village and the Hohgant. The mountains around Schangnau provided timber, meadows for cattle and brought tourists to the municipality

Schangnau is first mentioned in 1306 as Schoengowe.

By the 14th century the Ministerialis (unfree knights in the service of a feudal overlord) family of Sumiswald, in service to the Kyburgs, owned most of the village. Between 1363 and 1389 they sold their land and rights to the local nobleman Jost von Wald. His descendants sold the village to the city of Bern in 1420. By the second half of the 15th century both Bern and Lucerne claimed the village as they attempted to expand their borders to the detriment of the other. In 1470 a border treaty established Bernese ownership over Schangnau.

Originally Schangnau and the nearby village of Marbach, today a part of Escholzmatt-Marbach in the Canton of Lucerne, formed part of the parish of Trub. In 1524 the two villages broke away from Trub to form the parish of Marbach-Schangnau. A few years later, in 1528, Bern adopted the new faith of the Protestant Reformation and the village converted. A Reformed church was built in Schangnau in 1536 and in 1594 it separated from Marbach to form a parish. The village church was replaced with a new building in 1618. In the 17th century, as religious tension increased in Switzerland, Schangnau's location on the border with Catholic Lucerne became important. After the first First War of Villmergen in 1656, Bern made Protestant Schangnau into a market town to offset the nearby Catholic market town of Escholzmatt.

Historically the local economy was based on raising crops on the valley floor, seasonal alpine herding and transporting timber down the Emme River. The Bubenalp alpine meadow appears in a record in 1281, earlier than the village itself. By the 15th century, much of the mountain forest had been cleared to provide pastures for cattle. A small glass factory opened in the village in 1720, but was overshadowed by the larger factory in Entlebuch. Following the 1798 French invasion, Schangnau became part of the Helvetic Republic district of Oberemmental. With the collapse of the Republic and the 1803 Act of Mediation it became part of the Signau district, where it remained until the district was dissolved in 2009.

In the 19th century the Wiggen, Eggiswil and Schallenberg Pass roads connected the village with the rest of the country. The completion of a station on the Bern-Luzern Railroad in 1875 made it even easier to travel. However, very little industry settled in the municipality and agriculture and the dairy industry provided the majority of jobs. Even in 2005, over half of all jobs in Schangnau were in agriculture, while only 14% were in industry. The Kemmeribodenbad Inn at the foot of the Hohgant opened in 1835 and provided the start of a small tourism industry.

== Geography ==
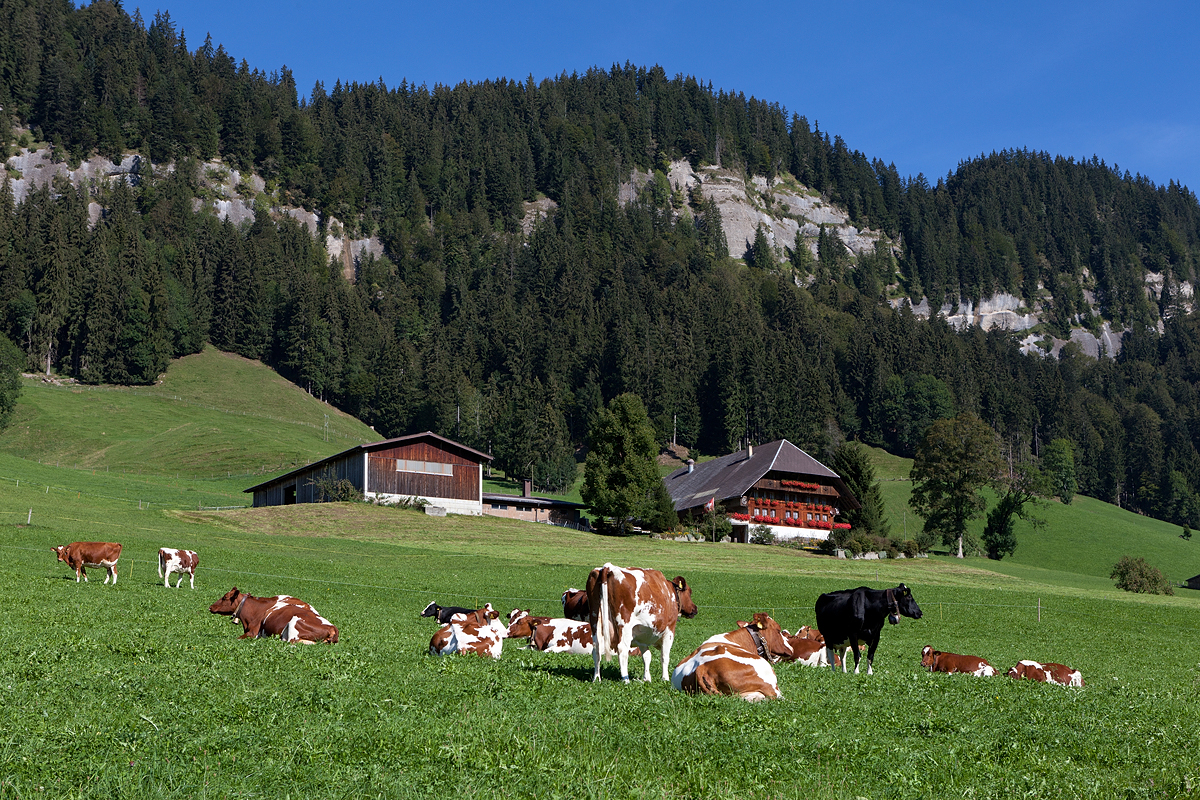
The hamlet Wald in Schangnau

Aerial view by Walter Mittelholzer (1925)

Schangnau has an area of 36.48 km^{2} (14.09 sq mi). As of 2012, a total of 19.43 km^{2} (7.50 mi^{2}) or 53.3% is used for agricultural purposes, while 13.05 km^{2} (5.04 mi^{2}) or 35.8% is forested. The rest of the municipality is 0.75 km^{2} (0.29 mi^{2}) or 2.1% is settled (buildings or roads), 0.39 km^{2} (0.15 mi^{2}) or 1.1% is either rivers or lakes and 2.91 km^{2} (1.12 mi^{2}) or 8.0% is unproductive land.

During the same year, housing and buildings made up 1.3% and transportation infrastructure made up 0.7%. A total of 31.0% of the total land area is heavily forested and 4.0% is covered with orchards or small clusters of trees. Of the agricultural land, 26.3% is pasturage and 26.1% is used for alpine pastures. All the water in the municipality is flowing water. Of the unproductive areas, 3.7% is unproductive vegetation and 4.3% is too rocky for vegetation.

The municipality has the highest elevation of any in the Emmental. It is located around the source of the Emme River, which gives the valley (Emmental) its name. The municipality includes the village of Schangnau (at 933 m (3,061 ft)) and the hamlet of Wald as well as individual houses in the valley.

On 31 December 2009 Amtsbezirk Signau, the municipality's former district, was dissolved. On the following day, 1 January 2010, it joined the newly created Verwaltungskreis Emmental.

== Coat of arms ==
The blazon of the municipal coat of arms is Gules a Bar wavy Argent overall a Fir Tree Vert trunked and eradicated Or surrounded in chief with three Mullets of the last.

== Demographics ==
Schangnau has a population (as of December 2020) of 918. As of 2012, 2.5% of the population are resident foreign nationals. Between the last 2 years (2010-2012) the population changed at a rate of -2.2%. Migration accounted for -0.5%, while births and deaths accounted for -1.0%.

Most of the population (as of 2000) speaks German (897 or 98.6%) as their first language, Serbo-Croatian is the second most common (10 or 1.1%) and French is the third (1 or 0.1%).

As of 2008, the population was 50.3% male and 49.7% female. The population was made up of 451 Swiss men (48.9% of the population) and 13 (1.4%) non-Swiss men. There were 450 Swiss women (48.8%) and 9 (1.0%) non-Swiss women. Of the population in the municipality, 586 or about 64.4% were born in Schangnau and lived there in 2000. There were 202 or 22.2% who were born in the same canton, while 72 or 7.9% were born somewhere else in Switzerland, and 26 or 2.9% were born outside of Switzerland.

As of 2012, children and teenagers (0–19 years old) make up 22.8% of the population, while adults (20–64 years old) make up 60.0% and seniors (over 64 years old) make up 17.2%.

As of 2000, there were 396 people who were single and never married in the municipality. There were 440 married individuals, 60 widows or widowers and 14 individuals who are divorced.

As of 2010, there were 90 households that consist of only one person and 41 households with five or more people. In 2000, a total of 307 apartments (79.3% of the total) were permanently occupied, while 58 apartments (15.0%) were seasonally occupied and 22 apartments (5.7%) were empty. The vacancy rate for the municipality, in 2013, was 0.7%. In 2011, single family homes made up 21.8% of the total housing in the municipality.

The historical population is given in the following chart:

== Economy ==
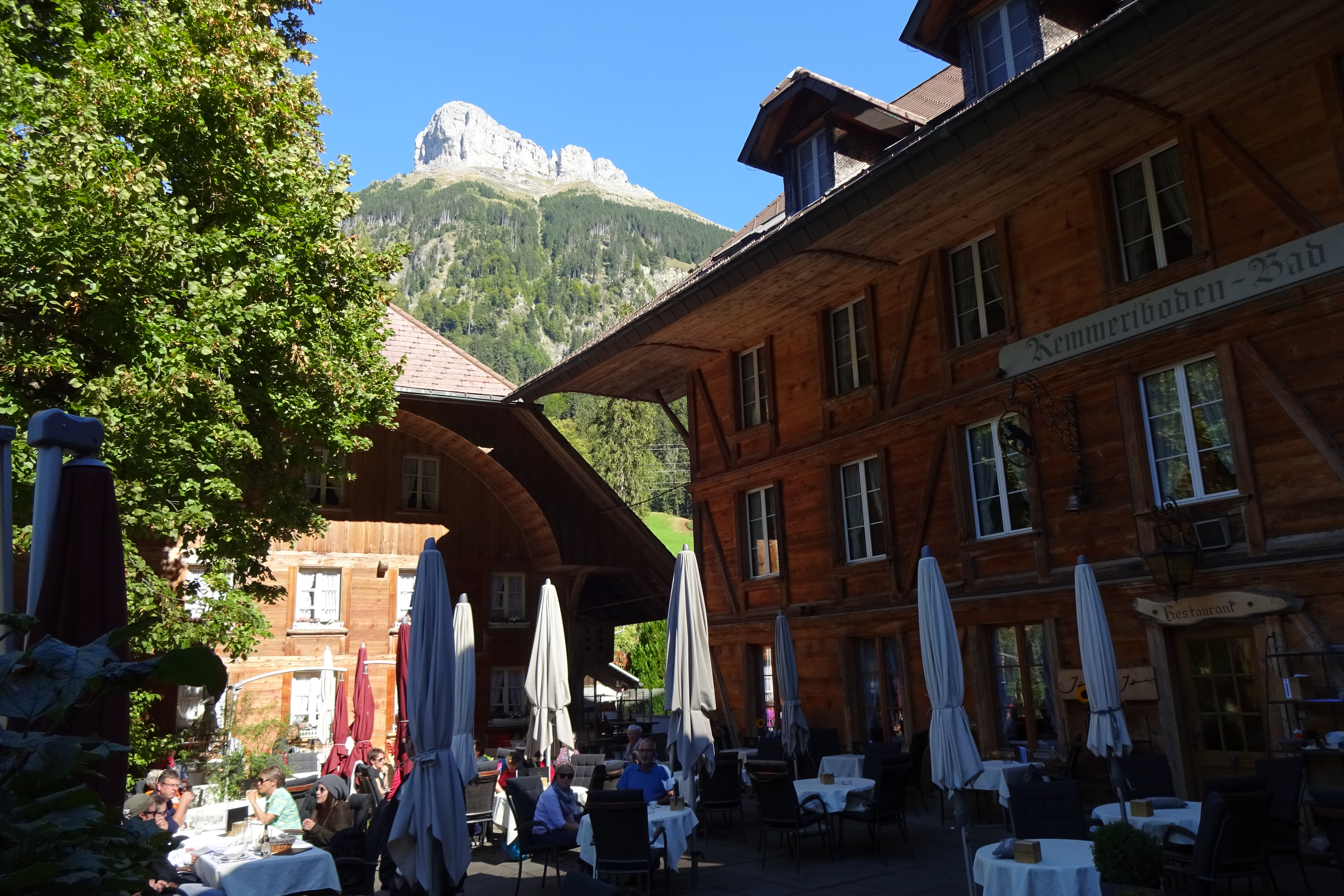
Schangnau-Kemmeriboden – Hotel Landgasthof Kemmeriboden-Bad

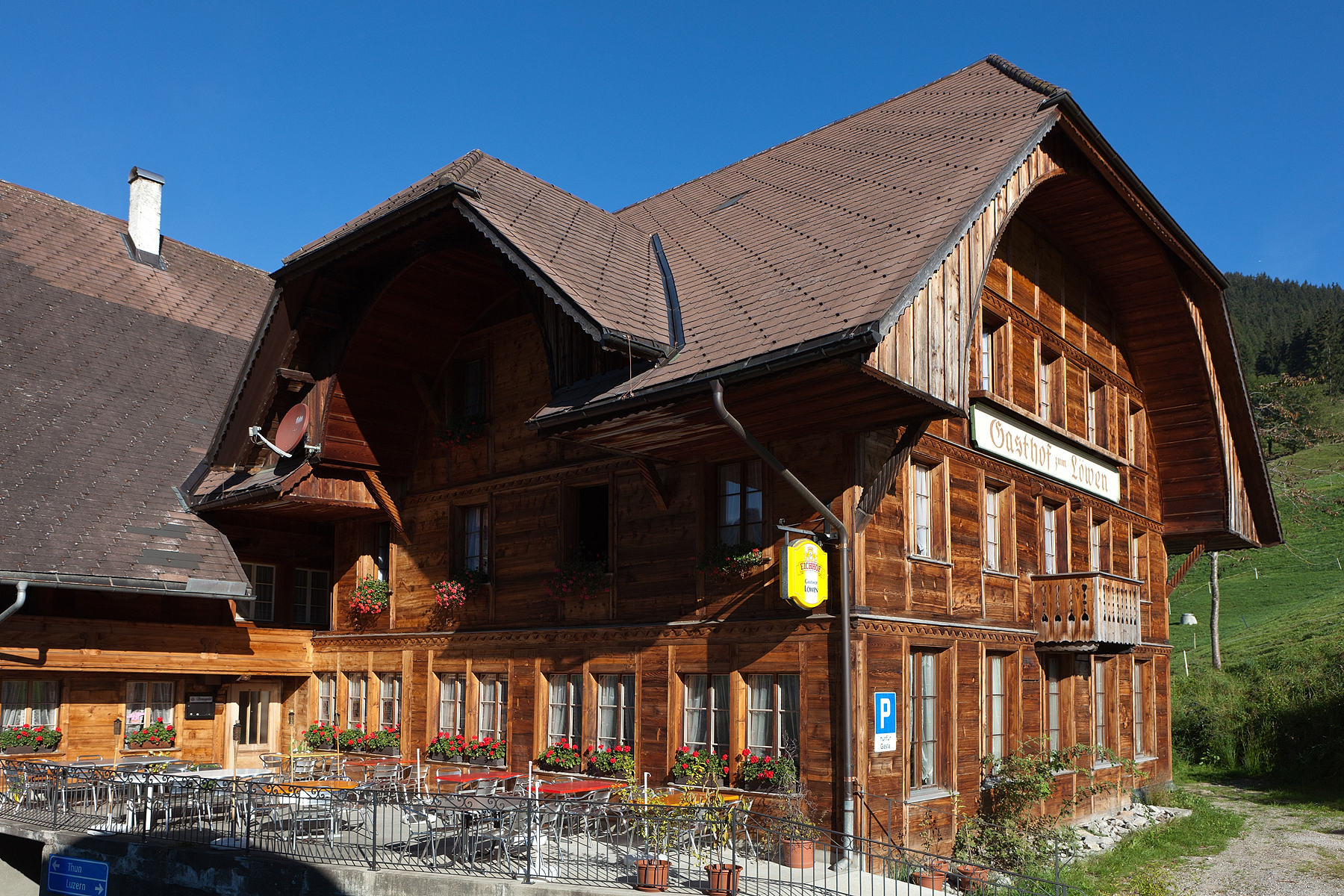
The Gasthof Löwen in Schangnau

As of 2011, Schangnau had an unemployment rate of 0.7%. As of 2011, there were a total of 522 people employed in the municipality. Of these, there were 258 people employed in the primary economic sector and about 85 businesses involved in this sector. 100 people were employed in the secondary sector and there were 28 businesses in this sector. 165 people were employed in the tertiary sector, with 38 businesses in this sector. There were 472 residents of the municipality who were employed in some capacity, of which females made up 37.1% of the workforce.

In 2008 there were a total of 338 full-time equivalent jobs. The number of jobs in the primary sector was 174, of which 173 were in agriculture and 1 was in forestry or lumber production. The number of jobs in the secondary sector was 60 of which 34 or (56.7%) were in manufacturing and 26 (43.3%) were in construction. The number of jobs in the tertiary sector was 104. In the tertiary sector; 40 or 38.5% were in wholesale or retail sales or the repair of motor vehicles, 22 or 21.2% were in the movement and storage of goods, 30 or 28.8% were in a hotel or restaurant and 7 or 6.7% were in education.

In 2000, there were 49 workers who commuted into the municipality and 120 workers who commuted away. The municipality is a net exporter of workers, with about 2.4 workers leaving the municipality for every one entering. A total of 352 workers (87.8% of the 401 total workers in the municipality) both lived and worked in Schangnau. Of the working population, 7.6% used public transportation to get to work, and 39.4% used a private car.

In 2012 the average local and cantonal tax rate on a married resident, with two children, of Schangnau making 150,000 CHF was 13%, while an unmarried resident's rate was 19.5%. For comparison, the average rate for the entire canton in 2011, was 14.2% and 22.0%, while the nationwide average was 12.3% and 21.1% respectively.

In 2009 there were a total of 336 tax payers in the municipality. Of that total, 45 made over 75,000 CHF per year. There were 2 people who made between 15,000 and 20,000 per year. The greatest number of workers, 94, made between 50,000 and 75,000 CHF per year. The average income of the over 75,000 CHF group in Schangnau was 98,409 CHF, while the average across all of Switzerland was 130,478 CHF.

In 2011 a total of 1.5% of the population received direct financial assistance from the government.

== Heritage sites of national significance ==
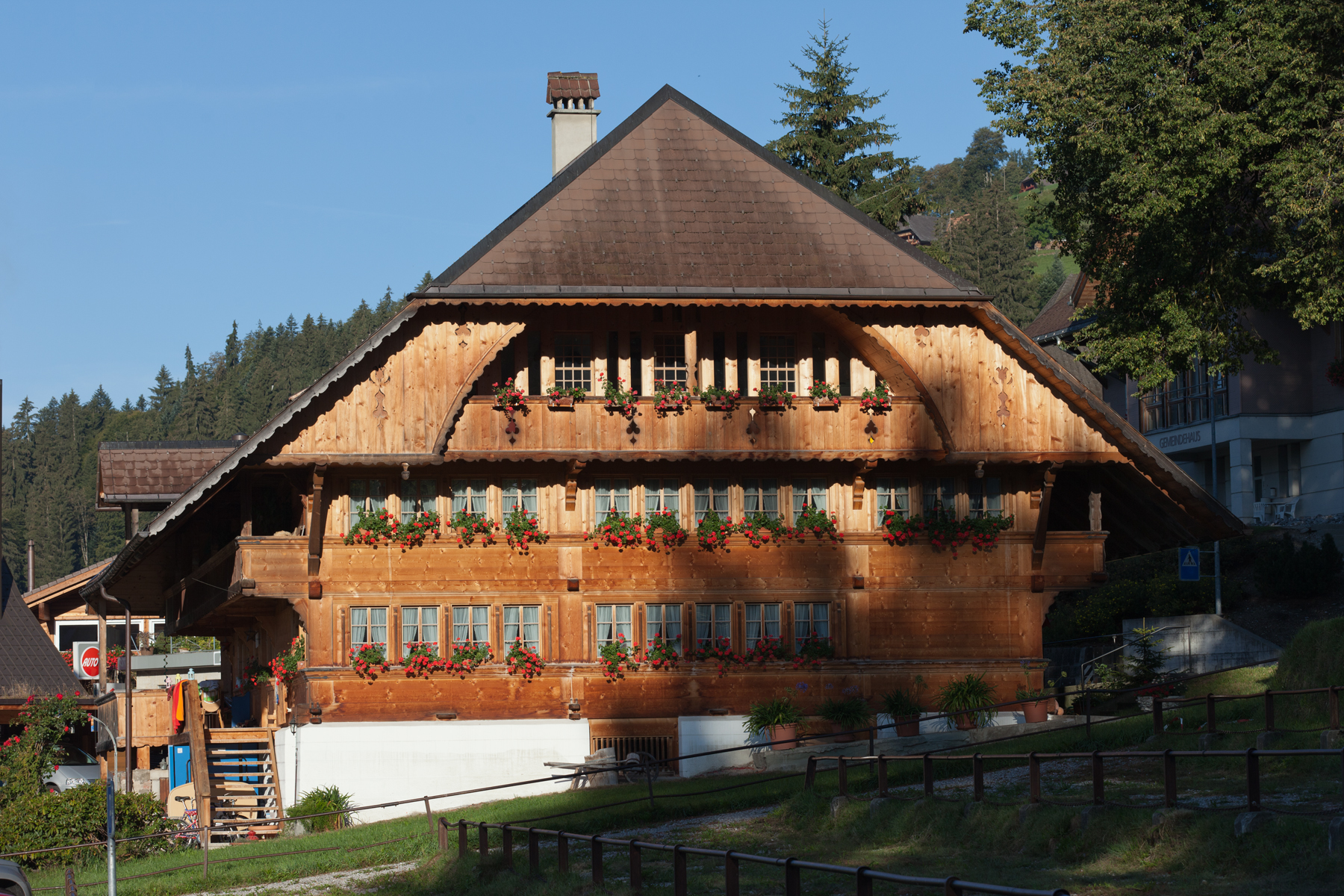
The Krämer House in Schongnau

The Krämer House is listed as a Swiss heritage site of national significance.

== Politics ==
In the 2011 federal election the most popular party was the Swiss People's Party (SVP) which received 74.6% of the vote. The next three most popular parties were the Conservative Democratic Party (BDP) (13.4%), the Social Democratic Party (SP) (2.8%) and the Green Party (2.8%). In the federal election, a total of 457 votes were cast, and the voter turnout was 59.6%.

== Religion ==
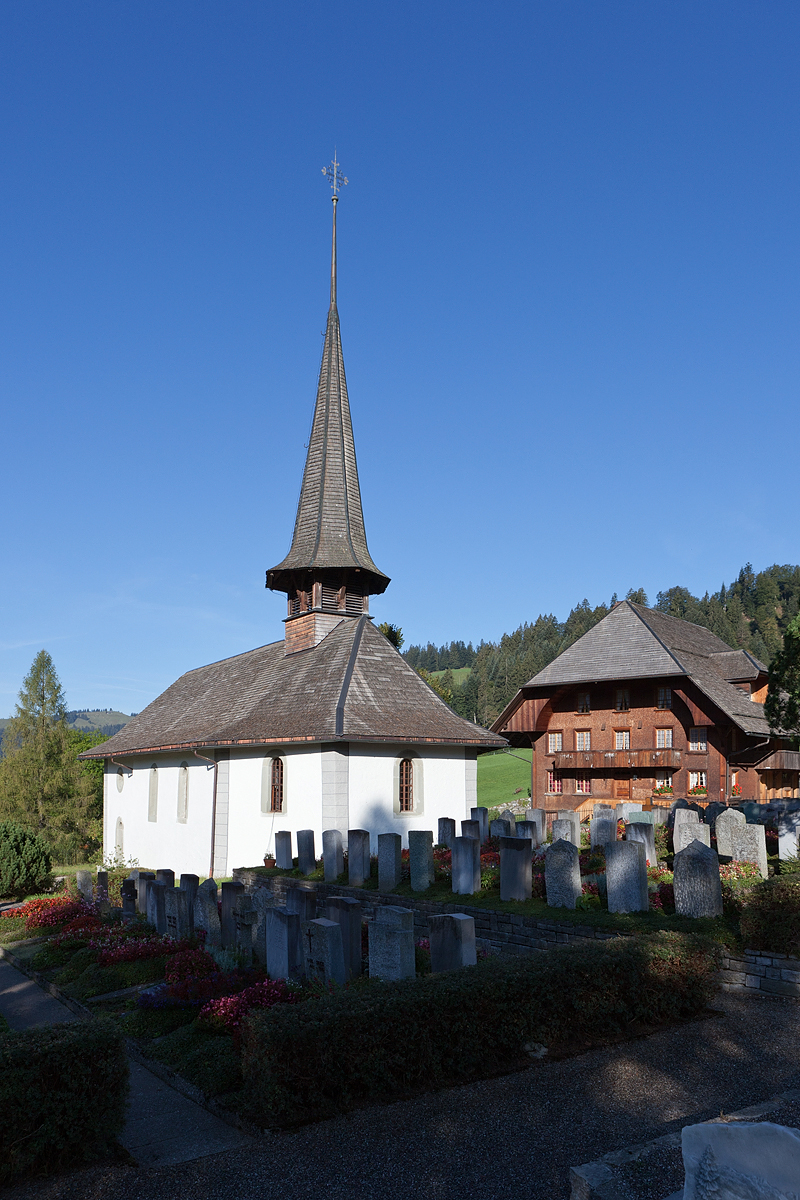
Schangnau village church

From the 2000 census, 814 or 89.5% belonged to the Swiss Reformed Church, while 34 or 3.7% were Roman Catholic. Of the rest of the population, there were 19 members of an Orthodox church (or about 2.09% of the population), and there were 6 individuals (or about 0.66% of the population) who belonged to another Christian church. There was 1 person who was Hindu. 15 (or about 1.65% of the population) belonged to no church, are agnostic or atheist, and 21 individuals (or about 2.31% of the population) did not answer the question.

== Education ==
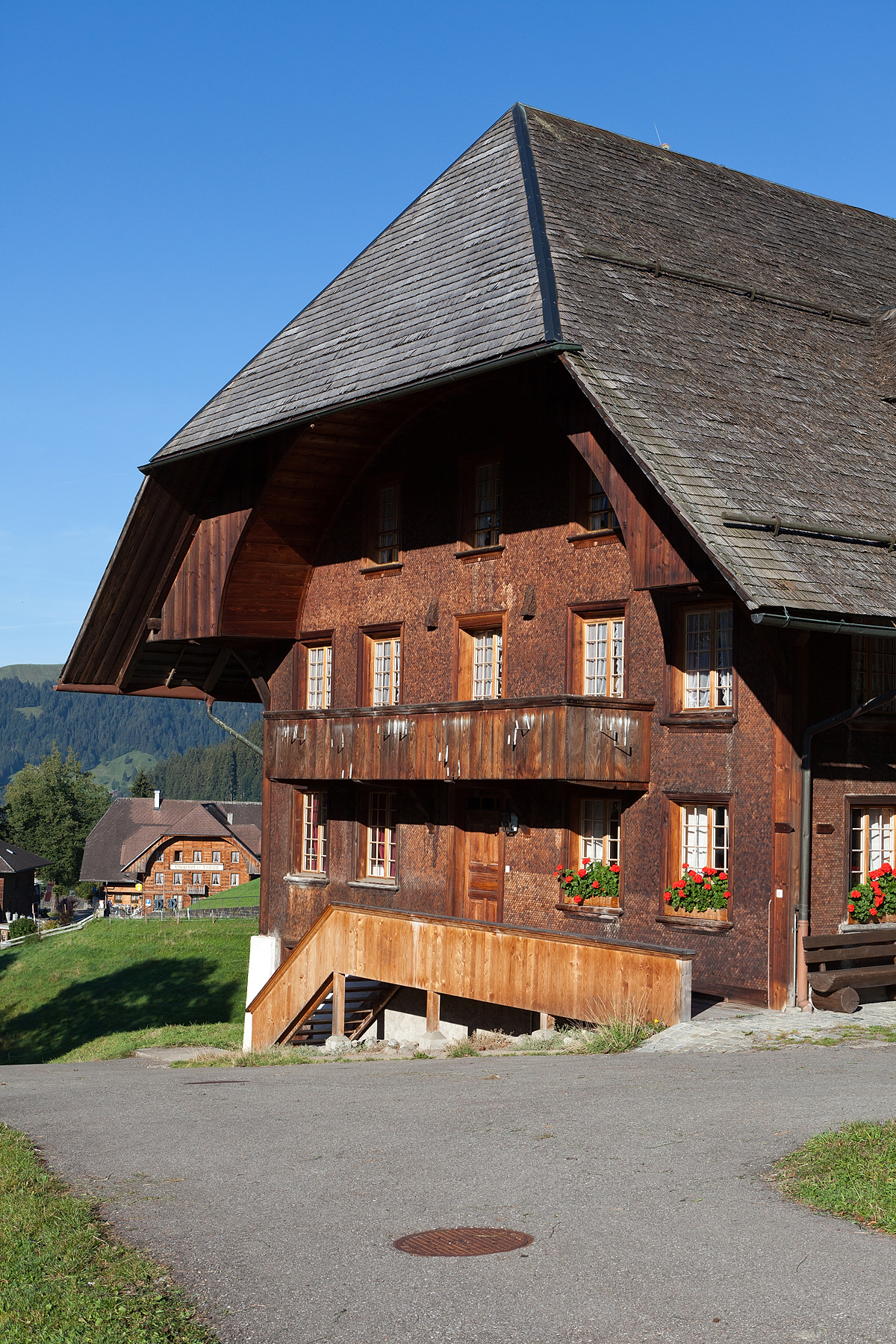
The old school house in Schangnau

In Schangnau about 52% of the population have completed non-mandatory upper secondary education, and 7.6% have completed additional higher education (either university or a Fachhochschule). Of the 41 who had completed some form of tertiary schooling listed in the census, 75.6% were Swiss men, 22.0% were Swiss women.

The Canton of Bern school system provides one year of non-obligatory Kindergarten, followed by six years of Primary school. This is followed by three years of obligatory lower Secondary school where the students are separated according to ability and aptitude. Following the lower Secondary students may attend additional schooling or they may enter an apprenticeship.

During the 2012-13 school year, there were a total of 114 students attending classes in Schangnau. There were a total of 25 students in the German language kindergarten classes in the municipality. The municipality's primary school had 60 students in German language classes. Of the primary students, 3.3% were permanent or temporary residents of Switzerland (not citizens) and 5.0% have a different mother language than the classroom language. During the same year, the lower secondary school had a total of 29 students. There were 3.4% who were permanent or temporary residents of Switzerland (not citizens) and 3.4% have a different mother language than the classroom language.

As of 2000, there were a total of 161 students attending any school in the municipality. Of those, 145 both lived and attended school in the municipality, while 16 students came from another municipality. During the same year, 7 residents attended schools outside the municipality.
