= Horrenbach-Buchen =

- Municipality
- Flag Coat of arms
- Location of Horrenbach-Buchen
- Location within Switzerland Location within Canton of Bern
- Coordinates: 46°46′N 7°45′E
- Country: Switzerland
- Canton: Bern
- District: Thun

Government
  - Mayor: Wilhelm Balmer

Area
  - Total: 20.37 km^{2} (7.86 sq mi)
- Elevation: 1,000 m (3,300 ft)

Population (Dec 2012)
  - Total: 256
  - Density: 12.6/km^{2} (32.5/sq mi)
- Time zone: UTC+01:00 (CET)
  - Summer (DST): UTC+02:00 (CEST)
- Postal code: 3623
- SFOS number: 932
- ISO 3166 code: CH-BE
- Surrounded by: Beatenberg, Eriz, Homberg, Oberlangenegg, Sigriswil, Teuffenthal, Unterlangenegg
- Website: www.horrenbach-buchen.ch

Horrenbach-Buchen is a municipality in the administrative district of Thun in the canton of Bern in Switzerland.

== History ==
Aerial view with Sigriswilergrat (1957)

Originally the small farming villages that make up Horrenbach-Buchen were part of the Herrschaft of Heimberg under the House of Kyburg. After a failed raid on Solothurn on 11 November 1382 and the resulting Burgdorferkrieg, the Kyburgs lost most of their lands, including Horrenbach-Buchen, to Bern in 1384. Under Bernese rule it was part of the Steffisburg court under the Thun District. Religiously it was part of the parish of Steffisburg until 1693 when it joined the Schwarzenegg parish. A church was built in Buchen in 1928, which became a parish church in 1935.

Traditionally the farmers of the villages practiced seasonal alpine herding with limited farming on the high valley floor. Today many of the residents commuted to jobs in Thun, while many of the remainder work in tourism.

== Geography ==
Horrenbach-Buchen has an area of 20.4 km^{2} (7.88 sq mi). As of the 2004/06 survey, a total of 10.22 km^{2} (3.95 mi^{2}) or 50.0% is used for agricultural purposes, while 8.06 km^{2} (3.11 mi^{2}) or 39.4% is forested. Of rest of the municipality 0.27 km^{2} (0.10 mi^{2}) or 1.3% is settled (buildings or roads), 0.24 km^{2} (0.093 mi^{2}) or 1.2% is either rivers or lakes and 1.61 km^{2} (0.62 mi^{2}) or 7.9% is unproductive land. Between the 1980/81 and 2004/06 surveys the settled area increased from 0.22 km^{2} (0.085 mi^{2}) to 0.27 km^{2} (0.10 mi^{2}), an increase of 22.73%.

From the same survey, housing and buildings made up 0.6% and transportation infrastructure made up 0.7%. A total of 33.5% of the total land area is heavily forested and 4.3% is covered with orchards or small clusters of trees. Of the agricultural land, 14.0% is pasturage and 35.5% is used for alpine pastures. All the water in the municipality is flowing water. Of the unproductive areas, 4.4% is unproductive vegetation and 3.5% is too rocky for vegetation.

The municipality is located in the mountains on the left side of the Zulg river valley. It consists of scattered hamlets and individual houses. The Teuffenbach (Teuffen stream) divides the municipality into two sections, the western section of Buchen and the eastern section of Horrenbach.

On 31 December 2009 Amtsbezirk Thun, the municipality's former district, was dissolved. On the following day, 1 January 2010, it joined the newly created Verwaltungskreis Thun.

== Coat of arms ==
The blazon of the municipal coat of arms is Gules between two Mullets Argent on a Bend of the same three Beech Leaves.

== Demographics ==
Horrenbach-Buchen has a population (as of December 2020) of 226. As of 2012, 1.2% of the population are resident foreign nationals. Most of the population (as of 2000) speaks German (222 or 100.0%) as their first language with the rest speaking French.

As of 2008, the population was 55.5% male and 44.5% female. The population was made up of 140 Swiss men (54.7% of the population) and 2 (0.8%) non-Swiss men. There were 114 Swiss women (44.5%) and (0.0%) non-Swiss women. Of the population in the municipality, 132 or about 59.5% were born in Horrenbach-Buchen and lived there in 2000. There were 75 or 33.8% who were born in the same canton, while 9 or 4.1% were born somewhere else in Switzerland, and 3 or 1.4% were born outside of Switzerland.

As of 2012, children and teenagers (0–19 years old) make up 21.5% of the population, while adults (20–64 years old) make up 61.7% and seniors (over 64 years old) make up 16.8%.

As of 2000, there were 95 people who were single and never married in the municipality. There were 105 married individuals, 15 widows or widowers and 7 individuals who are divorced.

As of 2010, there were 15 households that consist of only one person and 20 households with five or more people. In 2000, a total of 75 apartments (68.2% of the total) were permanently occupied, while 26 apartments (23.6%) were seasonally occupied and 9 apartments (8.2%) were empty. The vacancy rate for the municipality, in 2013, was 2.3%. In 2012, single family homes made up 27.8% of the total housing in the municipality.

The historical population is given in the following chart:

== Economy ==
As of 2011, Horrenbach-Buchen had an unemployment rate of 0.31%. As of 2011, there were a total of 93 people employed in the municipality. Of these, there were 60 people employed in the primary economic sector and about 22 businesses involved in this sector. The secondary sector employs 14 people and there were 4 businesses in this sector. The tertiary sector employs 19 people, with 6 businesses in this sector. There were 105 residents of the municipality who were employed in some capacity, of which females made up 35.2% of the workforce.

In 2008 there were a total of 64 full-time equivalent jobs. The number of jobs in the primary sector was 44, all of which were in agriculture. The number of jobs in the secondary sector was 10 of which 2 were in manufacturing and 8 were in construction. The number of jobs in the tertiary sector was 10. In the tertiary sector; 3 were in wholesale or retail sales or the repair of motor vehicles, 3 were in a hotel or restaurant and 4 were in health care.

In 2000, there were 12 workers who commuted into the municipality and 62 workers who commuted away. The municipality is a net exporter of workers, with about 5.2 workers leaving the municipality for every one entering. A total of 43 workers (78.2% of the 55 total workers in the municipality) both lived and worked in Horrenbach-Buchen. Of the working population, 4.8% used public transportation to get to work, and 47.6% used a private car.

The local and cantonal tax rate in Horrenbach-Buchen is one of the lowest in the canton. In 2012 the average local and cantonal tax rate on a married resident, with two children, of Horrenbach-Buchen making 150,000 CHF was 12.2%, while an unmarried resident's rate was 18.2%. For comparison, the average rate for the entire canton in 2011, was 14.2% and 22.0%, while the nationwide average was 12.3% and 21.1% respectively.

In 2010 there were a total of 83 tax payers in the municipality. Of that total, 8 made over 75,000 CHF per year. There was one person who made between 15,000 and 20,000 per year. The greatest number of workers, 21, made between 50,000 and 75,000 CHF per year. The average income of the over 75,000 CHF group in Horrenbach-Buchen was 92,100 CHF, while the average across all of Switzerland was 131,244 CHF.

In 2011 a total of 0.4% of the population received direct financial assistance from the government.

== Politics ==
In the 2015 federal election the most popular party was the Swiss People's Party (SVP) which received 84.5% of the vote. The next three most popular parties were the Conservative Democratic Party (BDP) with 5.3%, the Federal Democratic Union of Switzerland (EDU) with 3.6% and the Free Democratic Party of Switzerland (FDP) with 1.9%. In the federal election, a total of 124 votes were cast, and the voter turnout was 66.3%.

== Religion ==
From the 2000 census, 201 or 90.5% belonged to the Swiss Reformed Church, while 8 or 3.6% were Roman Catholic. Of the rest of the population, there were 4 individuals (or about 1.80% of the population) who belonged to another Christian church. 3 (or about 1.35% of the population) belonged to no church, are agnostic or atheist, and 6 individuals (or about 2.70% of the population) did not answer the question.

== Education ==
In Horrenbach-Buchen about 40.5% of the population have completed non-mandatory upper secondary education, and 5.4% have completed additional higher education (either university or a Fachhochschule). Of the 6 who had completed some form of tertiary schooling listed in the census, 83.3% were Swiss men, 16.7% were Swiss women.

As of 2000, there were a total of 26 students attending any school in the municipality. Of those, 25 both lived and attended school in the municipality, while one student came from another municipality. During the same year, 11 residents attended schools outside the municipality.
