= Oberlangenegg =

- Municipality
- Flag Coat of arms
- Location of Oberlangenegg
- Location within Switzerland Location within Canton of Bern
- Coordinates: 46°47′N 7°43′E
- Country: Switzerland
- Canton: Bern
- District: Thun

Government
  - Mayor: Ueli Jaberg

Area
  - Total: 9.15 km^{2} (3.53 sq mi)
- Elevation: 920 m (3,020 ft)

Population (Dec 2012)
  - Total: 481
  - Density: 52.6/km^{2} (136/sq mi)
- Time zone: UTC+01:00 (CET)
  - Summer (DST): UTC+02:00 (CEST)
- Postal code: 3616
- SFOS number: 935
- ISO 3166 code: CH-BE
- Surrounded by: Eriz, Horrenbach-Buchen, Röthenbach im Emmental, Teuffenthal, Unterlangenegg, Wachseldorn
- Website: www.oberlangenegg.ch

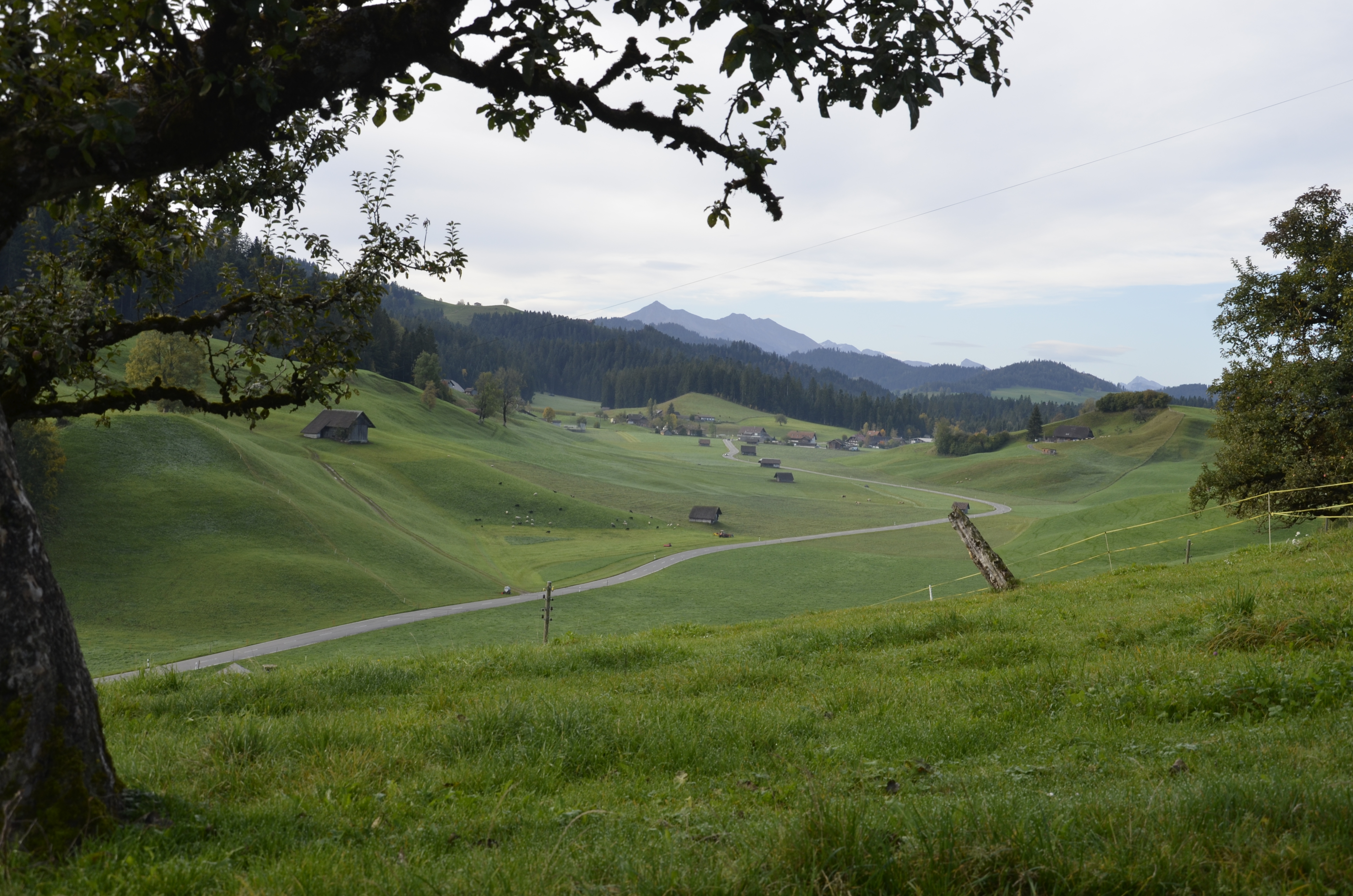
The Süderenmoos with Kreuzweg in Oberlangenegg

Oberlangenegg is a municipality in the administrative district of Thun in the canton of Bern in Switzerland.

== History ==
Oberlangenegg is first mentioned in 1308 as Langonegga.

The oldest trace of a settlement in the area is a Bronze Age dagger which was discovered in the Lindenmoos. For most of its history Oberlangenegg and Unterlangenegg were combined into a single municipality and Oberlangenegg was the sparsely populated, heavily wooded part. The village of Schwarzenegg, located on the border with Unterlangenegg, was more densely populated and was an economic and religious center of the Zulg valley. Schwarzenegg was located on the Steffisburg-Oberemmental road and in 1693 a large parish church was built to help curb the growing popularity of the Anabaptist faith in the region. Today the municipality is still mostly agrarian and rural with over half of the local jobs in agriculture. In 2005 a wood working factory opened in the village and provides some manufacturing jobs.

== Geography ==
Oberlangenegg has an area of 9.16 km^{2} (3.54 sq mi). As of the 2006 survey, a total of 4.15 km^{2} (1.60 mi^{2}) or 45.5% is used for agricultural purposes, while 4.47 km^{2} (1.73 mi^{2}) or 49.0% is forested. Of rest of the municipality 0.42 km^{2} (0.16 mi^{2}) or 4.6% is settled (buildings or roads), 0.03 km^{2} (7.4 acres) or 0.3% is either rivers or lakes and 0.04 km^{2} (9.9 acres) or 0.4% is unproductive land.

From the same survey, housing and buildings made up 2.4% and transportation infrastructure made up 1.5%. All of the forested land area is covered with heavy forests. Of the agricultural land, 7.8% is used for growing crops and 37.4% is pasturage. All the water in the municipality is flowing water.

The municipality is located in the Zulg river valley on the western slope and foot hills of the Honegg mountain. It consists of two clusters of settlements, the outer with Stalden and part of the village of Schwarzenegg (shared with Unterlangenegg) and the inner with Kreuzweg, Aettenbühl and Süderen-Linden.

On 31 December 2009 Amtsbezirk Thun, the municipality's former district, was dissolved. On the following day, 1 January 2010, it joined the newly created Verwaltungskreis Thun.

== Coat of arms ==
The blazon of the municipal coat of arms is Argent a Fir Tree Vert between a Buck and a Doe Gules statant on Base of the second.

== Demographics ==
Oberlangenegg has a population (as of December 2020) of 483. As of 2012, 1.2% of the population are resident foreign nationals. Between the last 2 years (2010-2012) the population changed at a rate of -1.6%. Migration accounted for -1.4%, while births and deaths accounted for -0.6%.

Most of the population (as of 2000) speaks German (472 or 97.9%) as their first language, Albanian is the second most common (5 or 1.0%) and French is the third (3 or 0.6%).

As of 2008, the population was 48.3% male and 51.7% female. The population was made up of 236 Swiss men (48.3% of the population) and (0.0%) non-Swiss men. There were 248 Swiss women (50.7%) and 5 (1.0%) non-Swiss women. Of the population in the municipality, 239 or about 49.6% were born in Oberlangenegg and lived there in 2000. There were 187 or 38.8% who were born in the same canton, while 21 or 4.4% were born somewhere else in Switzerland, and 16 or 3.3% were born outside of Switzerland.

As of 2012, children and teenagers (0–19 years old) make up 24.9% of the population, while adults (20–64 years old) make up 53.0% and seniors (over 64 years old) make up 22.0%.

As of 2000, there were 205 people who were single and never married in the municipality. There were 249 married individuals, 22 widows or widowers and 6 individuals who are divorced.

As of 2010, there were 59 households that consist of only one person and 20 households with five or more people. In 2000, a total of 167 apartments (90.3% of the total) were permanently occupied, while 10 apartments (5.4%) were seasonally occupied and 8 apartments (4.3%) were empty. As of 2012, the construction rate of new housing units was 2.1 new units per 1000 residents. In 2012, single family homes made up 21.3% of the total housing in the municipality.

The historical population is given in the following chart:

== Economy ==
As of 2011, Oberlangenegg had an unemployment rate of 0.71%. As of 2011, there were a total of 227 people employed in the municipality. Of these, there were 115 people employed in the primary economic sector and about 38 businesses involved in this sector. The secondary sector employs 39 people and there were 9 businesses in this sector. The tertiary sector employs 73 people, with 21 businesses in this sector. There were 233 residents of the municipality who were employed in some capacity, of which females made up 36.1% of the workforce.

In 2008 there were a total of 173 full-time equivalent jobs. The number of jobs in the primary sector was 70, all of which were in agriculture. The number of jobs in the secondary sector was 68 of which 59 or (86.8%) were in manufacturing and 9 (13.2%) were in construction. The number of jobs in the tertiary sector was 35. In the tertiary sector; 4 or 11.4% were in wholesale or retail sales or the repair of motor vehicles, 3 or 8.6% were in the movement and storage of goods, 13 or 37.1% were in a hotel or restaurant, 2 or 5.7% were the insurance or financial industry, 1 was a technical professional or scientist, 4 or 11.4% were in education and 4 or 11.4% were in health care.

In 2000, there were 44 workers who commuted into the municipality and 143 workers who commuted away. The municipality is a net exporter of workers, with about 3.3 workers leaving the municipality for every one entering. A total of 90 workers (67.2% of the 134 total workers in the municipality) both lived and worked in Oberlangenegg. Of the working population, 6% used public transportation to get to work, and 57.5% used a private car.

The local and cantonal tax rate in Oberlangenegg is one of the lowest in the canton. In 2012 the average local and cantonal tax rate on a married resident, with two children, of Oberlangenegg making 150,000 CHF was 12.3%, while an unmarried resident's rate was 18.4%. For comparison, the average rate for the entire canton in 2011, was 14.2% and 22.0%, while the nationwide average was 12.3% and 21.1% respectively.

In 2010 there were a total of 184 tax payers in the municipality. Of that total, 35 made over 75,000 CHF per year. There was one person who made between 15,000 and 20,000 per year. The greatest number of workers, 53, made between 50,000 and 75,000 CHF per year. The average income of the over 75,000 CHF group in Oberlangenegg was 105,457 CHF, while the average across all of Switzerland was 131,244 CHF.

In 2011 a total of 3.8% of the population received direct financial assistance from the government.

== Politics ==
In the 2011 federal election the most popular party was the Swiss People's Party (SVP) which received 70.8% of the vote. The next three most popular parties were the Conservative Democratic Party (BDP) (7.1%), the Social Democratic Party (SP) (4.6%) and the Federal Democratic Union of Switzerland (EDU) (4.4%). In the federal election, a total of 228 votes were cast, and the voter turnout was 58.8%.

== Religion ==
From the 2000 census, 439 or 91.1% belonged to the Swiss Reformed Church, while 6 or 1.2% were Roman Catholic. Of the rest of the population, there were 4 individuals (or about 0.83% of the population) who belonged to another Christian church. There were 14 (or about 2.90% of the population) who were Muslim. 10 (or about 2.07% of the population) belonged to no church, are agnostic or atheist, and 9 individuals (or about 1.87% of the population) did not answer the question.

== Education ==
In Oberlangenegg about 52.1% of the population have completed non-mandatory upper secondary education, and 5.9% have completed additional higher education (either university or a Fachhochschule). Of the 17 who had completed some form of tertiary schooling listed in the census, 76.5% were Swiss men, 23.5% were Swiss women.

The Canton of Bern school system provides one year of non-obligatory Kindergarten, followed by six years of Primary school. This is followed by three years of obligatory lower Secondary school where the students are separated according to ability and aptitude. Following the lower Secondary students may attend additional schooling or they may enter an apprenticeship.

During the 2012-13 school year, there were a total of 51 students attending classes in Oberlangenegg. There were a total of 12 students in the German language kindergarten classes in the municipality. Of the kindergarten students, 8.3% have a different mother language than the classroom language. The municipality's primary school had 40 students in German language classes. Of the primary students, 2.5% were permanent or temporary residents of Switzerland (not citizens) and 2.5% have a different mother language than the classroom language. During the same year, the lower secondary schools in neighboring municipalities had a total of 11 students from Oberlangenegg. The remainder of the students attend a private or special school.

As of 2000, there were a total of 38 students attending any school in the municipality. Of those, 35 both lived and attended school in the municipality, while 3 students came from another municipality. During the same year, 42 residents attended schools outside the municipality.
