= Herrschaft =

Territory or a feudal lord in medieval Europe

The German term Herrschaft (German pronunciation: [ˈhɛʁʃaft]; plural: Herrschaften [ˈhɛʁʃaftn̩]) covers a broad semantic field and only the context will tell whether it means, "rule", "power", "dominion", "authority", "territory" or "lordship". In its most abstract sense, it refers to power relations in general while more concretely it may refer to the individuals or institutions that exercise that power. Finally, in a spatial sense in the Holy Roman Empire, it refers to a territory over which this power is exercised.

== The Herrschaft as a territory ==
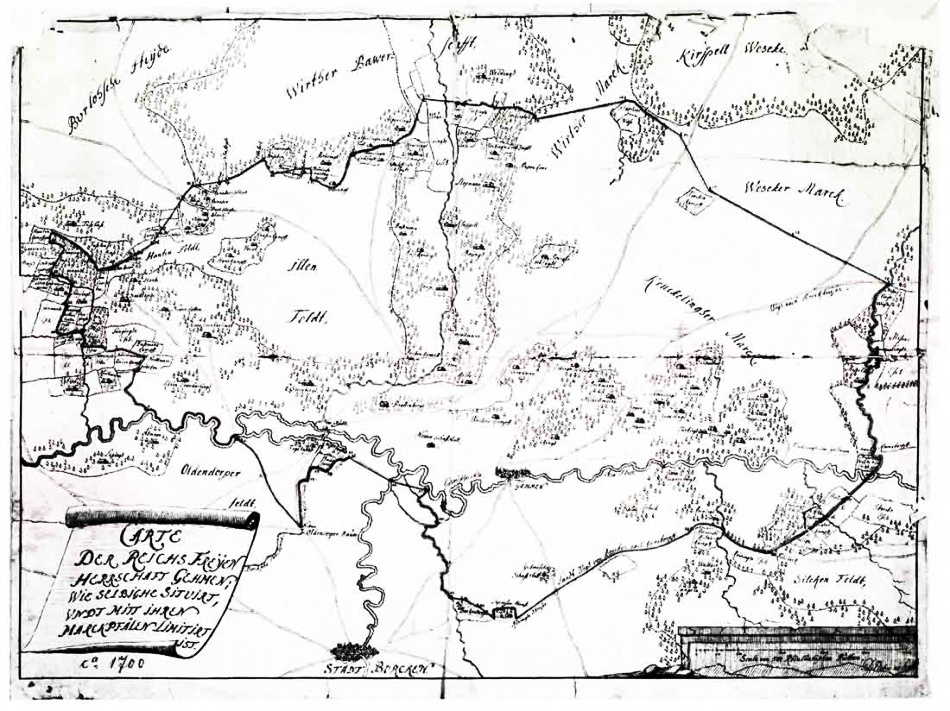
1700 map showing the Lordship of Gemen. That year the lordship gained immediacy, becoming the "Free Imperial Lordship of Gemen".

The Herrschaft, whose closest equivalent was the French seigneurie, usually translated as "lordship" in English, denoted a specific area of land with rights over both the soil and its inhabitants. While the lord (Herr) was often a noble, it could also be a commoner such as a burgher, or a corporate entity such as a bishopric, a cathedral chapter, an abbey, a hospice or a town.

Most lordships were mediate, which meant that their lords and inhabitants owed allegiance to a territorial ruler — such as a duke, a margrave, a count, a prince, a prince-elector or a prince-bishop — who exercised a number of sovereign rights over them, including high justice, taxation and military conscription. However, several lordships were immediate, having gained that coveted status usually at some time during the Middle Ages. The lords of a small number of those immediate lordships, often imperial knights, eventually succeeded in having themselves raised to the status of count (Graf) or prince (Fürst) and recognized as imperial estates with a seat and vote at the Imperial Diet. Seventeenth-century jurists began to designate those immediate lordships, as well as the more important territories of imperial knights as baronia, and after them the custom was established in Germany to call them Baronie or Baronat (French: baronnie, English: barony) and their owners barons.

== See also ==
- Heerlijkheid
- Particuliere landerij, 17th-century Dutch East Indies (now Indonesia)

== Bibliography ==
- Hanns Hubert Hofmann: Quellen zum Verfassungsorganismus des Heiligen Römischen Reiches Deutscher Nation 1495–1815, Darmstadt 1976.
