= Zäziwil =

- Municipality
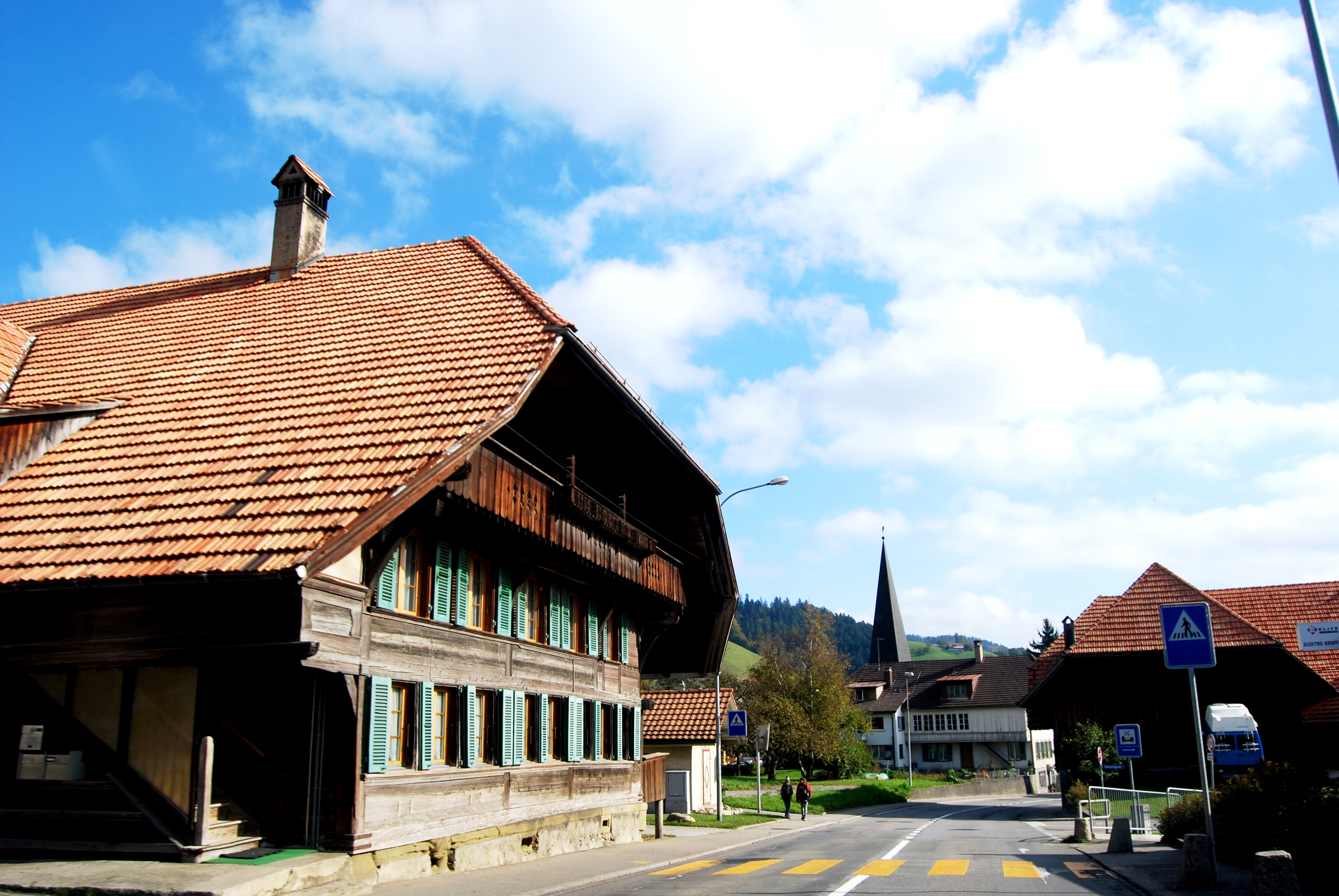

- Flag Coat of arms
- Location of Zäziwil
- Location within Switzerland Location within Canton of Bern
- Coordinates: 46°54′N 7°40′E
- Country: Switzerland
- Canton: Bern
- District: Bern-Mittelland

Government
  - Executive: Gemeinderat with 5 members
  - Mayor: Gemeindepräsident(in); Urs Hirschi (as of 2026)

Area
  - Total: 5.4 km^{2} (2.1 sq mi)
- Elevation: 686 m (2,251 ft)

Population (December 2020)
  - Total: 1,601
  - Density: 300/km^{2} (770/sq mi)
- Time zone: UTC+01:00 (CET)
  - Summer (DST): UTC+02:00 (CEST)
- Postal code: 3532
- SFOS number: 628
- ISO 3166 code: CH-BE
- Surrounded by: Bowil, Grosshöchstetten, Mirchel, Oberhünigen, Oberthal
- Website: www.zaeziwil.ch

Zäziwil is a municipality in the Bern-Mittelland administrative district in the canton of Bern in Switzerland.

== History ==
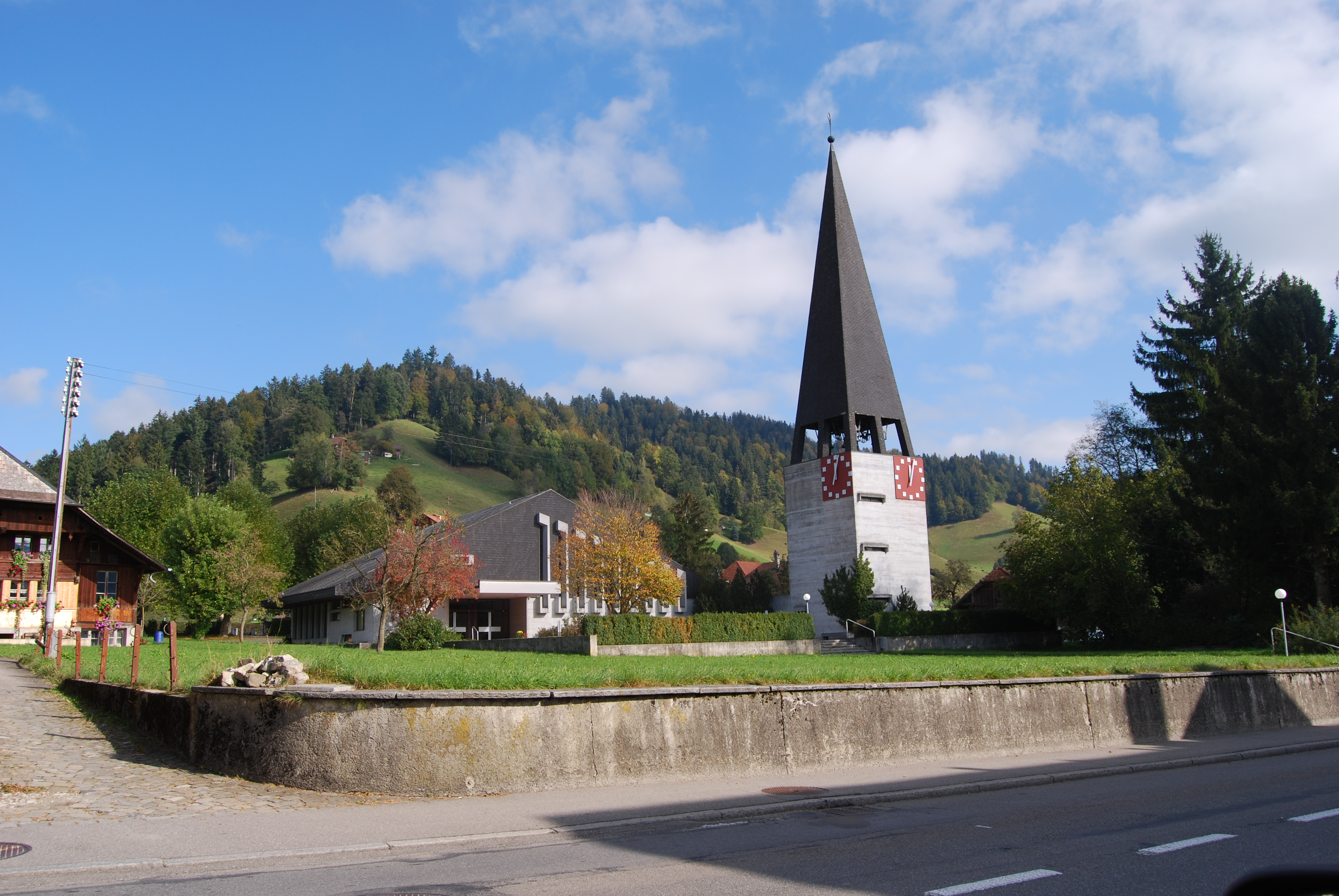
Village church of Zäziwil, built in 1964

Aerial view from 300 m by Walter Mittelholzer (1926)

Zäziwil is first mentioned in 1299 as Cezzenwile.

There are several ruined medieval fortifications scattered around the municipality. These include the ruins in the hills above the village, the earthen fortifications at Schwanden and Zwingherrenhubel and the castle site at Spitzer Chnubel. Very little is known about any of these sites. The village appears in the historical record as a part of the Herrschaft of Signau. The entire Herrschaft was acquired by the city of Bern in 1529 and became part of the bailiwick of Signau.

The villages that make up Zäziwil were part of the large parish of Grosshöchstetten. During the 19th century the villages' population grew and the parish was no longer able to meet the needs of the parishioners. In 1819 a Curate was assigned to the village, followed in 1874 by a Vicar. In 1961 the village became part of a sub-parish of Grosshöchstetten. The village church was built three years later.

Beginning in the 18th century mineral water spas opened in at Leimenbad and Brunnenbachbad. The spas were regionally famous and popular but closed down in the 19th century. During the 19th century many of the farmers began to raise grass for hay or dairy cattle for milk and cheese. A local dairy opened during this period and remains in operation today. The completion of a railroad station of the Bern-Lucerne line in the village allowed industry and commuters to settle in Zäziwil. The village of Rütenen has remained generally rural and agricultural, while Zäziwil has become a regional commercial center.

There are primary schools in both Zäziwil and Rütenen.

== Geography ==
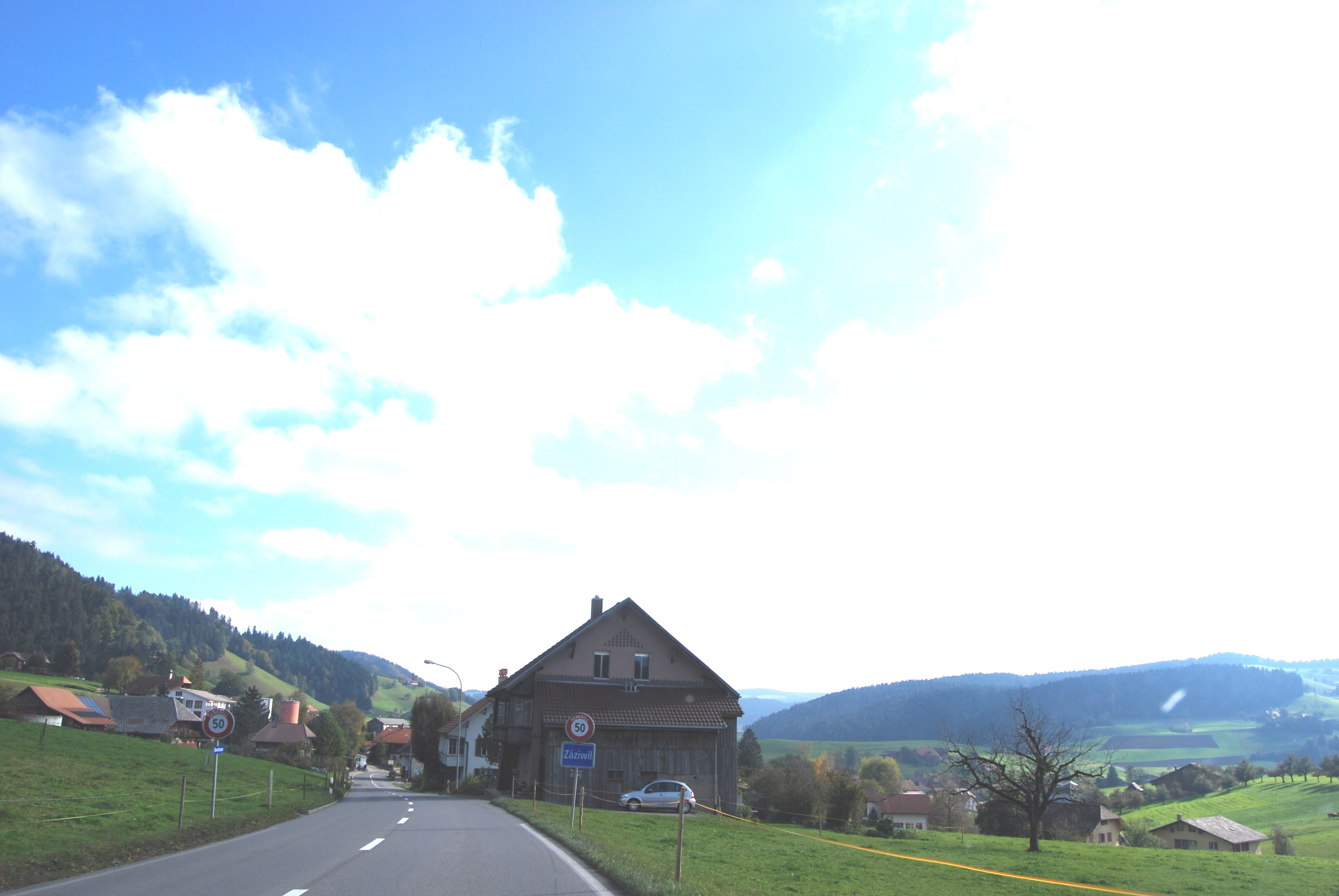
Zäziwil village and surrounding countryside

Zäziwil has an area of 5.41 km^{2} (2.09 sq mi). As of 2012, a total of 3.48 km^{2} (1.34 mi^{2}) or 64.2% is used for agricultural purposes, while 1.44 km^{2} (0.56 mi^{2}) or 26.6% is forested. Of the rest of the land, 0.52 km^{2} (0.20 mi^{2}) or 9.6% is settled (buildings or roads).

During the same year, housing and buildings made up 5.7% and transportation infrastructure made up 2.8%. Out of the forested land, 25.3% of the total land area is heavily forested and 1.3% is covered with orchards or small clusters of trees. Of the agricultural land, 27.9% is used for growing crops and 33.4% is pastures, while 3.0% is used for orchards or vine crops.

The municipality is located in the upper Kiesen valley (Kiesental). It consists of the villages of Zäziwil and Leimen and the hamlets of Rütenen and Länzligen as well as scattered farm houses.

On 31 December 2009 Amtsbezirk Konolfingen, the municipality's former district, was dissolved. On the following day, 1 January 2010, it joined the newly created Verwaltungskreis Bern-Mittelland.

== Coat of arms ==
The blazon of the municipal coat of arms is Azure a Fleur-de-lis Argent.

== Demographics ==
Zäziwil has a population (as of December 2020) of 1,601. As of 2010, 6.7% of the population are resident foreign nationals. Over the last 10 years (2001-2011) the population has changed at a rate of 2.6%. Migration accounted for 1.8%, while births and deaths accounted for 0.6%.

Most of the population (as of 2000) speaks German (1,466 or 96.8%) as their first language, Italian is the second most common (16 or 1.1%) and Turkish is the third (9 or 0.6%). There are 8 people who speak French.

As of 2008, the population was 51.2% male and 48.8% female. The population was made up of 754 Swiss men (47.4% of the population) and 61 (3.8%) non-Swiss men. There were 731 Swiss women (45.9%) and 46 (2.9%) non-Swiss women. Of the population in the municipality, 480 or about 31.7% were born in Zäziwil and lived there in 2000. There were 763 or 50.4% who were born in the same canton, while 152 or 10.0% were born somewhere else in Switzerland, and 94 or 6.2% were born outside of Switzerland.

As of 2011, children and teenagers (0–19 years old) make up 21.7% of the population, while adults (20–64 years old) make up 61.4% and seniors (over 64 years old) make up 17%.

As of 2000, there were 655 people who were single and never married in the municipality. There were 732 married individuals, 77 widows or widowers and 50 individuals who are divorced.

As of 2010, there were 212 households that consist of only one person and 47 households with five or more people. In 2000, a total of 603 apartments (92.9% of the total) were permanently occupied, while 22 apartments (3.4%) were seasonally occupied and 24 apartments (3.7%) were empty. As of 2010, the construction rate of new housing units was 5 new units per 1000 residents. The vacancy rate for the municipality, in 2011, was 1.22%.

The historical population is given in the following chart:

== Politics ==
In the 2011 federal election the most popular party was the Swiss People's Party (SVP) which received 35.6% of the vote. The next three most popular parties were the Conservative Democratic Party (BDP) (21.3%), the Social Democratic Party (SP) (14.1%) and the Green Party (6.6%). In the federal election, a total of 627 votes were cast, and the voter turnout was 50.7%.

== Economy ==
As of 2011, Zäziwil had an unemployment rate of 0.88%. As of 2008, there were a total of 418 people employed in the municipality. Of these, there were 76 people employed in the primary economic sector and about 27 businesses involved in this sector. 181 people were employed in the secondary sector and there were 34 businesses in this sector. 161 people were employed in the tertiary sector, with 36 businesses in this sector. There were 844 residents of the municipality who were employed in some capacity, of which females made up 41.9% of the workforce.

In 2008 there were a total of 329 full-time equivalent jobs. The number of jobs in the primary sector was 49, all of which were in agriculture. The number of jobs in the secondary sector was 164 of which 91 or (55.5%) were in manufacturing and 70 (42.7%) were in construction. The number of jobs in the tertiary sector was 116. In the tertiary sector; 40 or 34.5% were in wholesale or retail sales or the repair of motor vehicles, 2 or 1.7% were in the movement and storage of goods, 13 or 11.2% were in a hotel or restaurant, 3 or 2.6% were the insurance or financial industry, 13 or 11.2% were technical professionals or scientists, 12 or 10.3% were in education and 15 or 12.9% were in health care.

In 2000, there were 173 workers who commuted into the municipality and 611 workers who commuted away. The municipality is a net exporter of workers, with about 3.5 workers leaving the municipality for every one entering. A total of 233 workers (57.4% of the 406 total workers in the municipality) both lived and worked in Zäziwil.

Of the working population, 18.7% used public transportation to get to work, and 56% used a private car.

In 2011 the average local and cantonal tax rate on a married resident of Zäziwil making 150,000 CHF was 12.4%, while an unmarried resident's rate was 18.2%. For comparison, the average rate for the entire canton in 2006 was 13.9% and the nationwide rate was 11.6%. In 2009 there were a total of 702 tax payers in the municipality. Of that total, 197 made over 75 thousand CHF per year. There were 6 people who made between 15 and 20 thousand per year. The greatest number of workers, 219, made between 50 and 75 thousand CHF per year.

== Religion ==
From the 2000 census, 1,228 or 81.1% belonged to the Swiss Reformed Church, while 116 or 7.7% were Roman Catholic. Of the rest of the population, there were 6 members of an Orthodox church (or about 0.40% of the population), there was 1 individual who belongs to the Christian Catholic Church, and there were 123 individuals (or about 8.12% of the population) who belonged to another Christian church. There were 4 individuals (or about 0.26% of the population) who were Jewish, and 22 (or about 1.45% of the population) who were Islamic. There was 1 person who was Buddhist and 2 individuals who belonged to another church. 52 (or about 3.43% of the population) belonged to no church, are agnostic or atheist, and 18 individuals (or about 1.19% of the population) did not answer the question.

== Education ==
In Zäziwil about 63.5% of the population have completed non-mandatory upper secondary education, and 16.4% have completed additional higher education (either university or a Fachhochschule). Of the 154 who had completed some form of tertiary schooling listed in the census, 73.4% were Swiss men, 21.4% were Swiss women, 3.2% were non-Swiss men.

The Canton of Bern school system provides one year of non-obligatory Kindergarten, followed by six years of Primary school. This is followed by three years of obligatory lower Secondary school where the students are separated according to ability and aptitude. Following the lower Secondary students may attend additional schooling or they may enter an apprenticeship.

During the 2011-12 school year, there were a total of 126 students attending classes in Zäziwil. There was one kindergarten class with a total of 21 students in the municipality. Of the kindergarten students, 9.5% have a different mother language than the classroom language. The municipality had 5 primary classes and 91 students. Of the primary students, 6.6% have a different mother language than the classroom language. During the same year, there was one lower secondary class with a total of 14 students. 14.3% have a different mother language than the classroom language.

As of 2000, there were a total of 163 students attending any school in the municipality. Of those, 163 both lived and attended school in the municipality while 85 students from Zäziwil attended schools outside the municipality. During the same year, 85 residents attended schools outside the municipality.

Zäziwil is home to the Schul- und Gemeindebibliothek Zäziwil (municipal library of Zäziwil). The library has (as of 2008) 3,796 books or other media, and loaned out 11,213 items in the same year. It was open a total of 180 days with average of 5 hours per week during that year.
