= Christian Wiedmer =

Swiss locksmith, editor and popular poet (1808–1857)

- Born: February 12, 1808; Signau, Switzerland
- Died: November 4, 1857 (aged 49); Signau, Switzerland
- Occupations: Locksmith, Newspaper editor, Poet
- Known for: Editor of Emmenthaler Blatt, author of Emmentaler Lied
- Spouse: Elisabeth Lüthi (m. 1831)

Christian Wiedmer (12 February 1808 – 4 November 1857) was a Swiss locksmith, newspaper editor, and folk poet from the Emmental region. He became a prominent figure in 19th-century Swiss liberal politics and journalism, serving as editor of the regional newspaper Emmenthaler Blatt. Wiedmer is remembered both for his metalwork and his dialect poetry, including the Emmentaler Lied.

== Early life and career ==
Christian Wiedmer was born into a family of village tailors and itinerant tailors in Signau. His mother, Magdalena née Jakob, was the daughter of a weaver from Langnau. Breaking with family tradition, Wiedmer decided to pursue a career as a mechanic rather than following the textile trades.

In 1823, through connections with his father's aunt, Wiedmer found an apprenticeship in Basel, though he remained there only a few months. The following year, in 1824, he began a more substantial training period under master locksmith Peter Lüthi in Lauperswil, which he completed successfully three years later. After a brief period of journeyman travel, which was interrupted due to health and family reasons, Wiedmer established his own workshop in Signau in 1829 and built his house shortly thereafter.

In 1831, Wiedmer married Elisabeth Lüthi. He gained recognition for his skillfully forged strongboxes, which were used as safes. By 1842, his business had grown substantially, employing twelve people.

== Literary and journalistic career ==
Wiedmer appears to have begun writing satirical poems during his apprenticeship years. The liberal movement that emerged after 1830 encouraged him to continue his literary pursuits. He participated in the second expedition of the Freischaren (Free Corps) in 1845 and in the Sonderbund War in 1847.

His political engagement through poetry became public when he published a poem in the Dorfblatt von Langnau criticizing the ambivalent stance of the Bern government toward the Free Corps. This caught the attention of publisher Friedrich Wyss, who invited Wiedmer to contribute more poetic works and subsequently offered him the editorship of the newspaper in 1846/1847.

Under Wiedmer's editorial leadership, the newspaper's circulation grew dramatically from 500 to 3,500 subscribers. The publication was renamed Emmenthaler Wochenblatt in 1850/1851 and later became the Emmenthaler Blatt in 1855. Many of Wiedmer's poems, which addressed contemporary political issues, were first published in this newspaper, typically appearing on the front page.

As an editor, Wiedmer actively opposed conservative currents and engaged in sharp criticism of his political opponents, including Albert Bitzius (pen name Jeremias Gotthelf), whom he denounced as a "bourgeois urban Jesuit, known worldwide for his coarseness." Ironically, despite their political antagonism, both Wiedmer and Bitzius became emblematic figures of the Emmental region in Swiss literature.

Wiedmer's literary work consisted primarily of dialect poetry that addressed both political themes and regional cultural identity. He wrote the Emmentaler Lied as well as other sensitive dialect poems. His poems often dealt with current political questions and were characterized by their accessibility to common readers.

== Death ==
Christian Wiedmer died on 4 November 1857 in his hometown of Signau, where he had spent most of his adult life as both craftsman and cultural figure.

== Bibliography ==
=== Works ===
- Wiedmer, Christian; Mayenthal, Louise [pseudonym of Niklaus Krähenbühl]: Vermischte Gedichte, 1848 (1874²).
- Verlag des Emmenthaler Blattes (ed.): Niene geit's so schön u lustig ... Eine Blütenlese aus Schlosser Wiedmers Gedichten. Zur Erinnerung an den ersten Redaktor des Emmenthaler-Blattes, Schlosser Chr. Wiedmer, 1803-1857, 1940.

=== Sources ===
- Rettenmund, Jürg (ed.): "Christian Wiedmers Tagebuch aus dem Sonderbundskrieg", in: Alpenhorn-Kalender. Brattig für das Emmental und die benachbarten Gebiete, 80, 2005, pp. 40–44.

=== Secondary literature ===
- Historischer Verein des Kantons Bern (ed.): Sammlung bernischer Biographien, vol. 3, 1898, pp. 569–578.
- Berger, Gottlieb: "Christian Wiedmer von Signau, Schlosser und Volksdichter, 1808-1857", 1909 (offprint from Alpenhorn. Beilage des Emmenthaler Blattes).
- Sommer, Hans: Volk und Dichtung des Emmentals, 1969, pp. 45–51.
- Gygax, Max: "Christian Wiedmer. Kämpfer für den Bundesstaat", in: Der Bund, 11.7.1998.
- Gygax, Max: "Schlosser, Redaktor, Freischärler, Volksdichter", in: Der Bund, 18.7.1998.
