= Ferdinand Steck Maschinenfabrik =

Swiss railway equipment manufacturer

- Industry: Specialist vehicle builder
- Founded: 1938
- Headquarters: Bowil, Bern, Switzerland
- Website: steck.ch

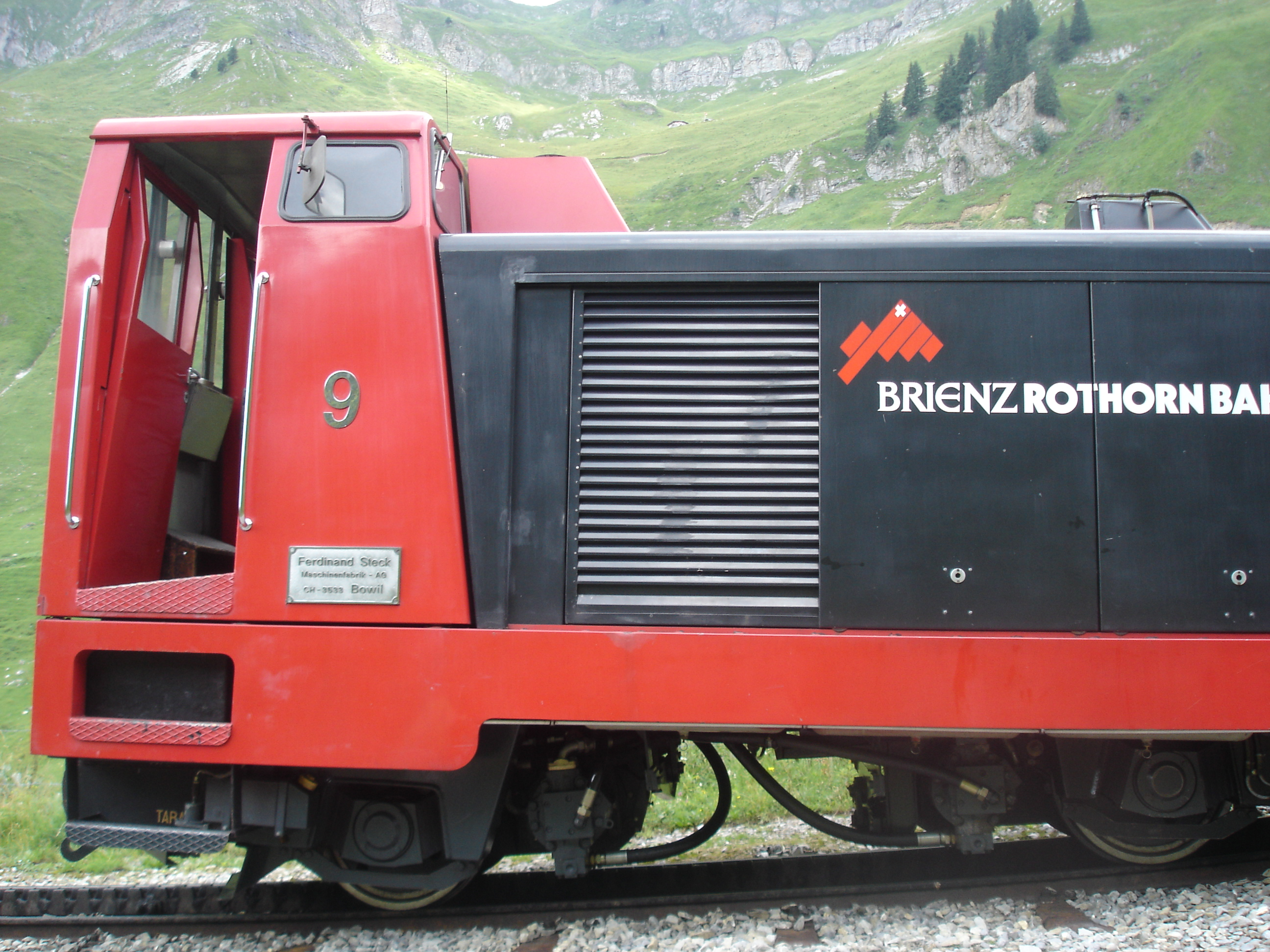
A diesel rack locomotive built for the Brienz-Rothorn Railway by Steck

Ferdinand Steck Maschinenfabrik AG is a Swiss manufacturer of specialist road building and railway equipment. The company is based at Bowil in the canton of Bern.

The company was founded in 1938 at Langnau im Emmental by Ferdinand Steck, who had previously worked as a railway mechanic and a road roller driver, in order to build his new design of road roller. The company moved to Bowil in 1960. In 1975 the company diversified into building specialist railway vehicles, including diesel locomotives for rack railways, such as the Brienz Rothorn Railway, the Furka Oberalp Railway and the Berner Oberland Railway.
