= Eggiwil =

- Municipality
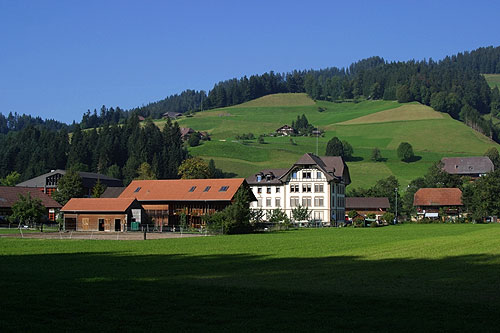
- Eggiwil village

- Flag Coat of arms
- Location of Eggiwil
- Location within Switzerland Location within Canton of Bern
- Coordinates: 46°53′N 7°48′E
- Country: Switzerland
- Canton: Bern
- District: Emmental

Government
  - Executive: Gemeinderat with 5 members
  - Mayor: Gemeindepräsident(in); Lydia Bähler (as of 2026)

Area
  - Total: 60.3 km^{2} (23.3 sq mi)
- Elevation: 736 m (2,415 ft)

Population (December 2020)
  - Total: 2,486
  - Density: 41.2/km^{2} (107/sq mi)
- Time zone: UTC+01:00 (CET)
  - Summer (DST): UTC+02:00 (CEST)
- Postal code: 3537
- SFOS number: 901
- ISO 3166 code: CH-BE
- Surrounded by: Langnau im Emmental, Marbach (LU), Röthenbach im Emmental, Schangnau, Signau, Trub, Trubschachen
- Website: www.eggiwil.ch

Eggiwil is a municipality in the administrative district of Emmental in the canton of Bern in Switzerland.

== History ==
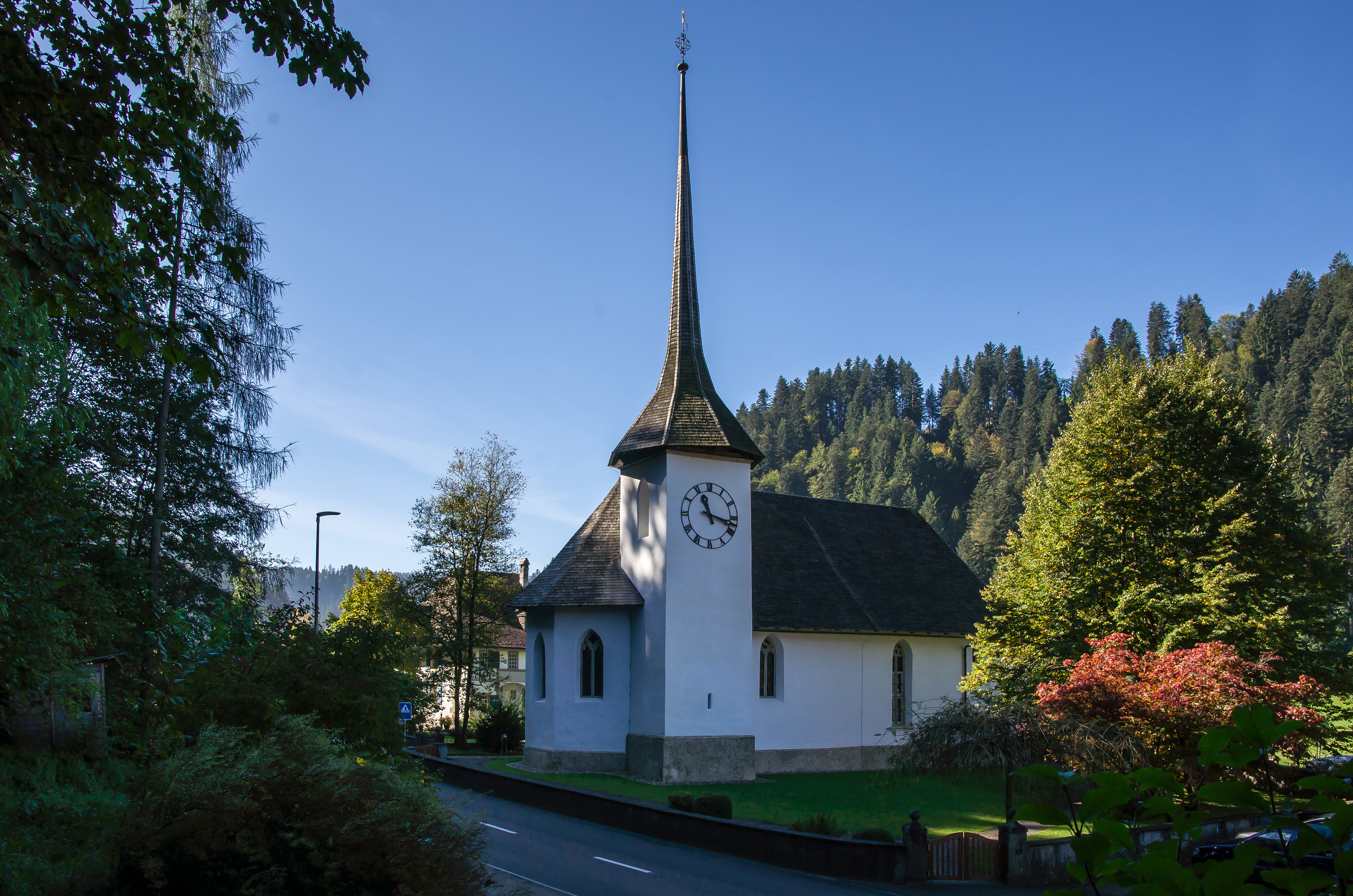
Swiss Reformed Church in Eggiwil, originally built in 1630-32

Eggiwil is first mentioned in 1323 as Eggenwile.

The village was probably settled in the 14th century. The Kyburg Ministerialis (unfree knights in the service of a feudal overlord) family of Eggiwil first appears around the same time. The villagers bought the land from the Freiherr von Schweinsberg in 1372 and later bought the right to hold court over themselves. While they were still part of the bailiwick and parish of Signau, on all local matters they were independent. In 1528 the city of Bern adopted the new faith of the Protestant Reformation and converted the surrounding area, including Eggiwil. In the following year, Bern brought the entire Signau area under their control. In the years following the Reformation in Bern, Anabaptists began to settle in Eggiwil. In 1630-32 Bern built a Swiss Reformed Church in the village to try to restrain the Anabaptists. In 1648, this church became the parish church of the Eggiwil parish.

The village is surrounded by a number of alpine meadows and much of the local economy depended on raising cattle in the meadows or harvesting timber from the surrounding forests. Deforestation from grazing and timber production caused a number of floods which damaged farm land and houses around the village and in the 19th century encouraged the villagers to reforest the surrounding mountains. Until the 1830 construction of a road to Schüpbach, the only way to reach the village was a narrow mountain path. Today, agriculture is still important, though a few machine shops, mills and sawmills provide additional jobs. Eggiwil lacks a convenient road or rail link to any major city and so very few residents commute to jobs elsewhere. Because the municipality is so spread out, there are eight primary school buildings scattered throughout its area.

== Geography ==
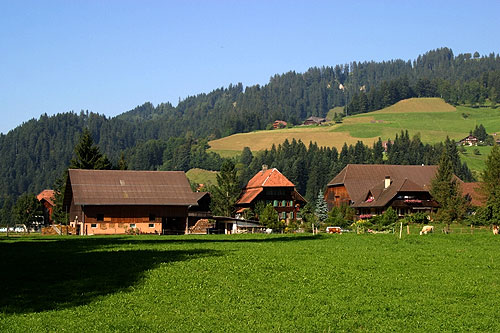
Eggiwil

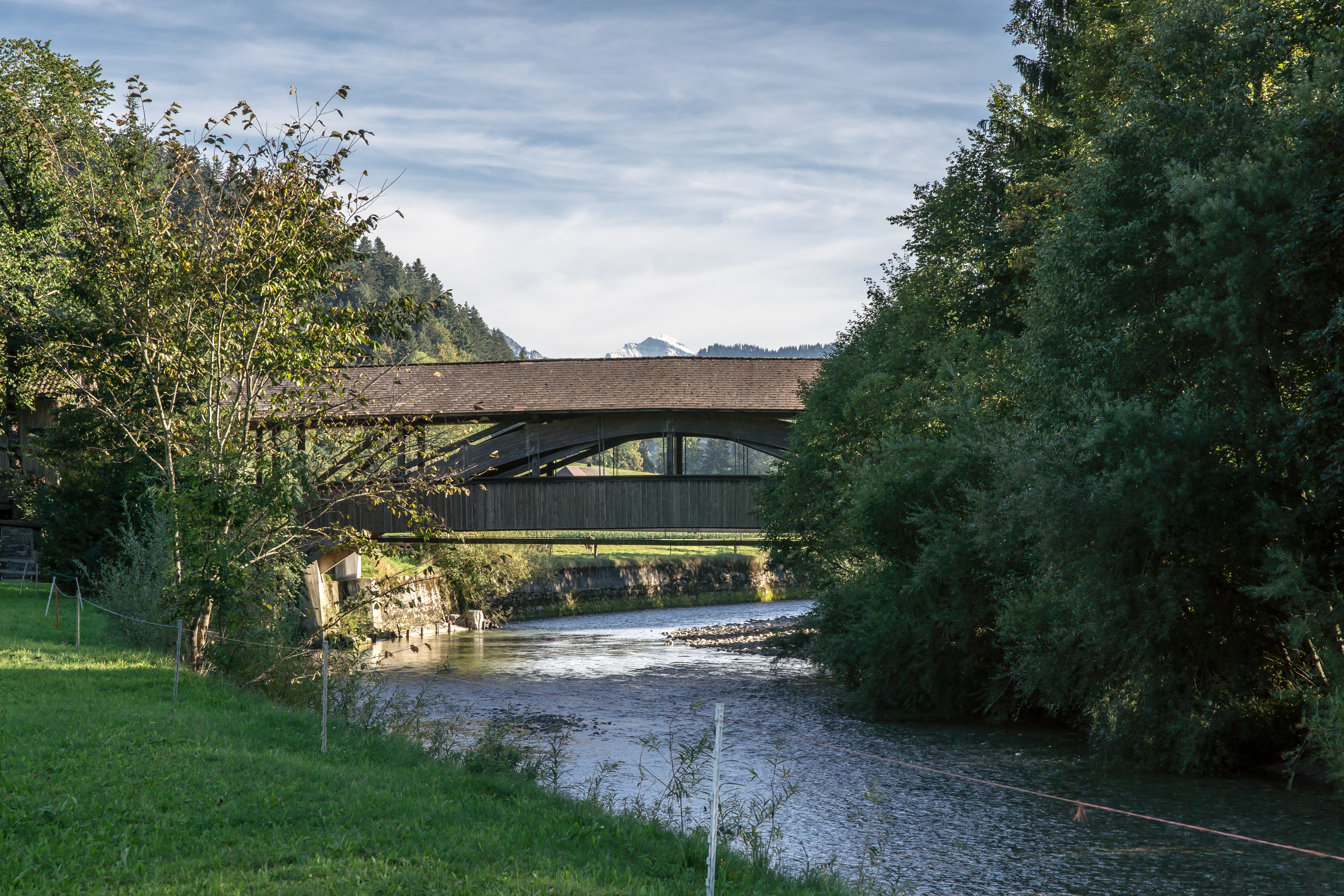
Dieboldswil wooden bridge over the Emme river

Eggiwil has an area of 60.3 km^{2} (23.28 sq mi). As of 2012, a total of 32.35 km^{2} (12.49 mi^{2}) or 53.6% is used for agricultural purposes, while 24.79 km^{2} (9.57 mi^{2}) or 41.1% is forested. The rest of the municipality is 2.11 km^{2} (0.81 mi^{2}) or 3.5% is settled (buildings or roads), 0.69 km^{2} (0.27 mi^{2}) or 1.1% is either rivers or lakes and 0.31 km^{2} (0.12 mi^{2}) or 0.5% is unproductive land.

During the same year, housing and buildings made up 1.8% and transportation infrastructure made up 1.4%. A total of 38.5% of the total land area is heavily forested and 2.6% is covered with orchards or small clusters of trees. Of the agricultural land, 4.2% is used for growing crops and 35.8% is pasturage and 13.0% is used for alpine pastures. All the water in the municipality is flowing water.

The municipality has a number of settlements scattered throughout its borders. The village Eggiwil is located near the Emme River. The village of Heidbühl is near the confluence of the Emme and Röthenbach rivers. Most of the smaller hamlets (Äschau, Neuenschwand, Horben and Dieboldswil) are located on a terrace, known as Eggen, above the rivers.

On 31 December 2009 Amtsbezirk Signau, the municipality's former district, was dissolved. On the following day, 1 January 2010, it joined the newly created Verwaltungskreis Emmental.

== Coat of arms ==
The blazon of the municipal coat of arms is Gules a Fir Tree eradicated Vert between in chief two Mullets Or.

== Demographics ==
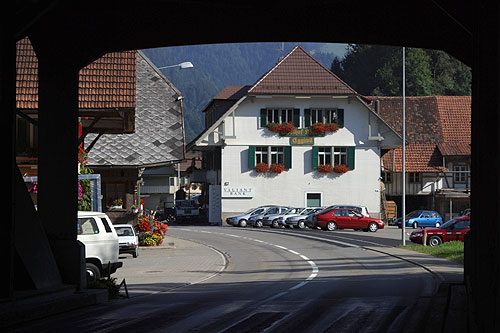
Northern entrance to Eggiwil village, under a wooden bridge

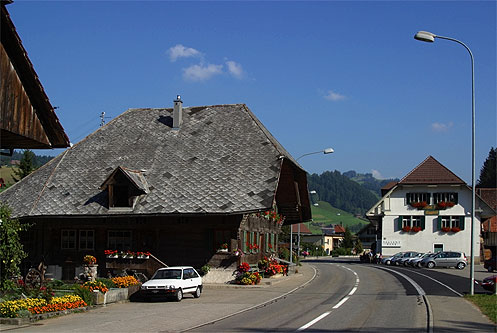
Eggiwil village

Eggiwil has a population (as of December 2020) of 2,486. As of 2012, 1.6% of the population are resident foreign nationals. Between the last 2 years (2010-2012) the population changed at a rate of -1.4%. Migration accounted for -2.2%, while births and deaths accounted for 0.7%.

Most of the population (as of 2000) speaks German (2,451 or 98.0%) as their first language, Albanian is the second most common (14 or 0.6%) and English is the third (4 or 0.2%). There is 1 person who speaks French.

As of 2008, the population was 51.8% male and 48.2% female. The population was made up of 1,260 Swiss men (51.2% of the population) and 15 (0.6%) non-Swiss men. There were 1,167 Swiss women (47.4%) and 19 (0.8%) non-Swiss women. Of the population in the municipality, 1,463 or about 58.5% were born in Eggiwil and lived there in 2000. There were 754 or 30.1% who were born in the same canton, while 131 or 5.2% were born somewhere else in Switzerland, and 63 or 2.5% were born outside of Switzerland.

As of 2012, children and teenagers (0–19 years old) make up 22.8% of the population, while adults (20–64 years old) make up 59.7% and seniors (over 64 years old) make up 17.6%.

As of 2000, there were 1,150 people who were single and never married in the municipality. There were 1,174 married individuals, 144 widows or widowers and 33 individuals who are divorced.

As of 2010, there were 234 households that consist of only one person and 123 households with five or more people. In 2000, a total of 799 apartments (82.7% of the total) were permanently occupied, while 119 apartments (12.3%) were seasonally occupied and 48 apartments (5.0%) were empty. As of 2012, the construction rate of new housing units was 0.8 new units per 1000 residents. The vacancy rate for the municipality, in 2013, was 3.0%. In 2011, single family homes made up 27.1% of the total housing in the municipality.

The historical population is given in the following chart:

== Heritage sites of national significance ==
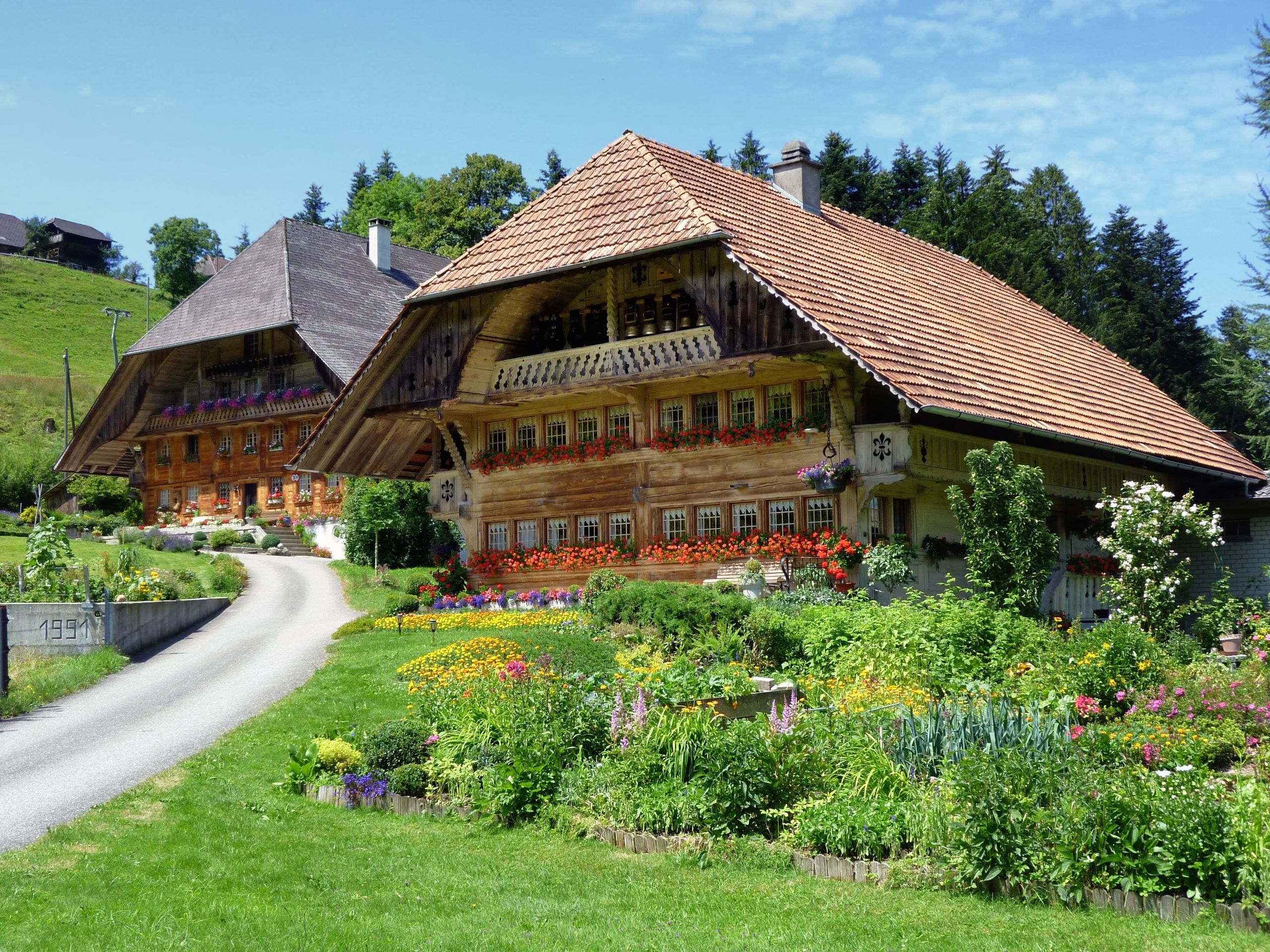
Farm House Inner-Zimmertsei

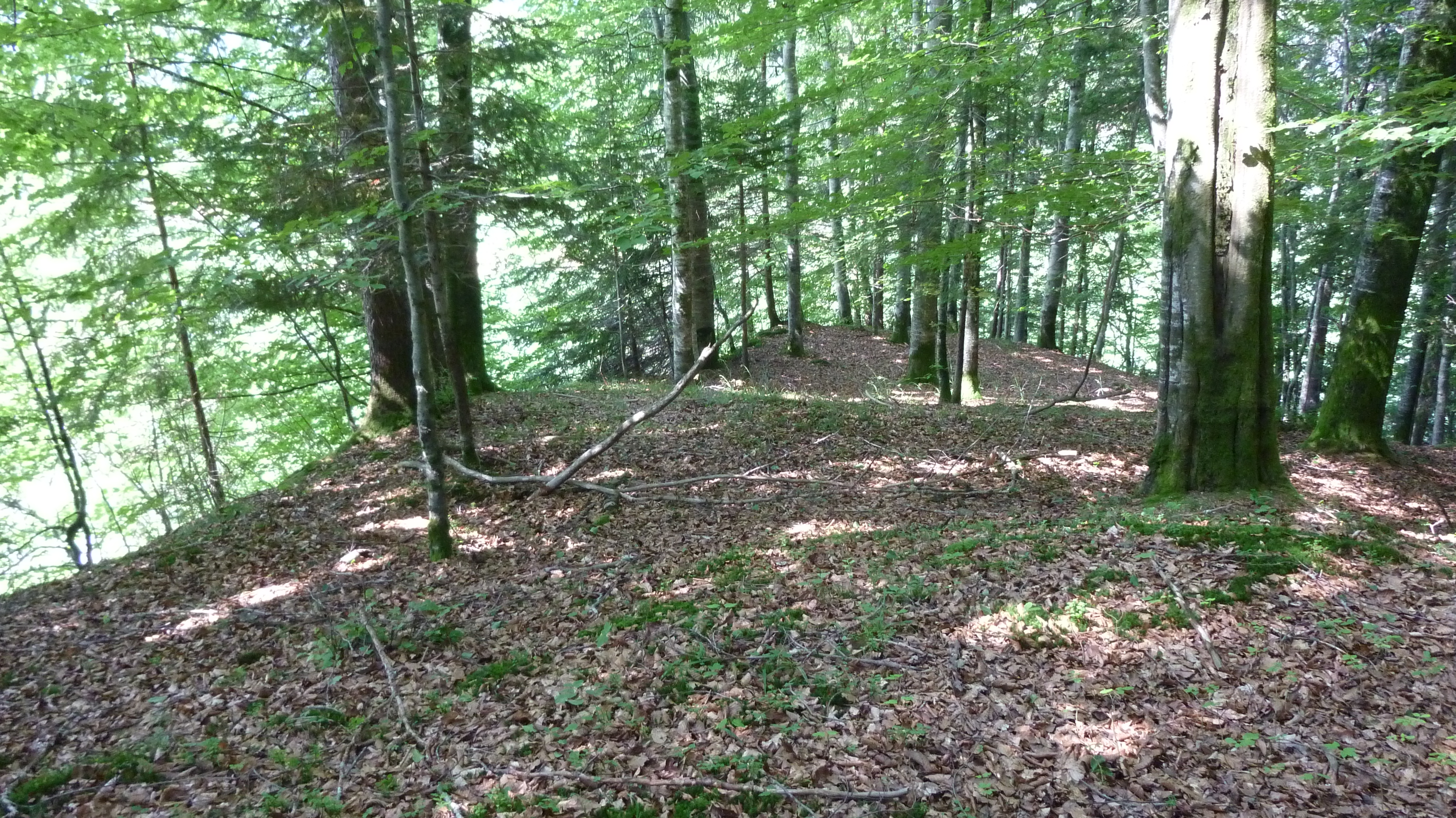
Schweinsberg

The Farm House Inner-Zimmertsei and the Schweinsberg, which is an earthwork from an undetermined era, are listed as Swiss heritage site of national significance.

== Politics ==
In the 2011 federal election the most popular party was the Swiss People's Party (SVP) which received 64.1% of the vote. The next three most popular parties were the Conservative Democratic Party (BDP) (14.5%), the Social Democratic Party (SP) (4.8%) and the Federal Democratic Union of Switzerland (EDU) (4.3%). In the federal election, a total of 960 votes were cast, and the voter turnout was 48.3%.

== Economy ==
As of 2011, Eggiwil had an unemployment rate of 0.78%. As of 2011, there were a total of 1,377 people employed in the municipality. Of these, there were 637 people employed in the primary economic sector and about 204 businesses involved in this sector. 358 people were employed in the secondary sector and there were 32 businesses in this sector. 382 people were employed in the tertiary sector, with 84 businesses in this sector. There were 1,303 residents of the municipality who were employed in some capacity, of which females made up 38.1% of the workforce.

In 2008 there were a total of 872 full-time equivalent jobs. The number of jobs in the primary sector was 414, of which 410 were in agriculture and 4 were in forestry or lumber production. The number of jobs in the secondary sector was 302 of which 164 or (54.3%) were in manufacturing and 139 (46.0%) were in construction. The number of jobs in the tertiary sector was 156. In the tertiary sector; 37 or 23.7% were in wholesale or retail sales or the repair of motor vehicles, 32 or 20.5% were in the movement and storage of goods, 37 or 23.7% were in a hotel or restaurant, 4 or 2.6% were the insurance or financial industry, 5 or 3.2% were technical professionals or scientists, 23 or 14.7% were in education and 6 or 3.8% were in health care.

In 2000, there were 222 workers who commuted into the municipality and 571 workers who commuted away. The municipality is a net exporter of workers, with about 2.6 workers leaving the municipality for every one entering. A total of 732 workers (76.7% of the 954 total workers in the municipality) both lived and worked in Eggiwil. Of the working population, 8.4% used public transportation to get to work, and 52% used a private car.

In 2011 the average local and cantonal tax rate on a married resident, with two children, of Eggiwil making 150,000 CHF was 12.8%, while an unmarried resident's rate was 18.8%. For comparison, the average rate for the entire canton in the same year, was 14.2% and 22.0%, while the nationwide average was 12.3% and 21.1% respectively.

In 2009 there were a total of 953 tax payers in the municipality. Of that total, 150 made over 75,000 CHF per year. There were 22 people who made between 15,000 and 20,000 per year. The greatest number of workers, 267, made between 50,000 and 75,000 CHF per year. The average income of the over 75,000 CHF group in Eggiwil was 106,355 CHF, while the average across all of Switzerland was 130,478 CHF.

In 2011 a total of 1.4% of the population received direct financial assistance from the government.

== Religion ==
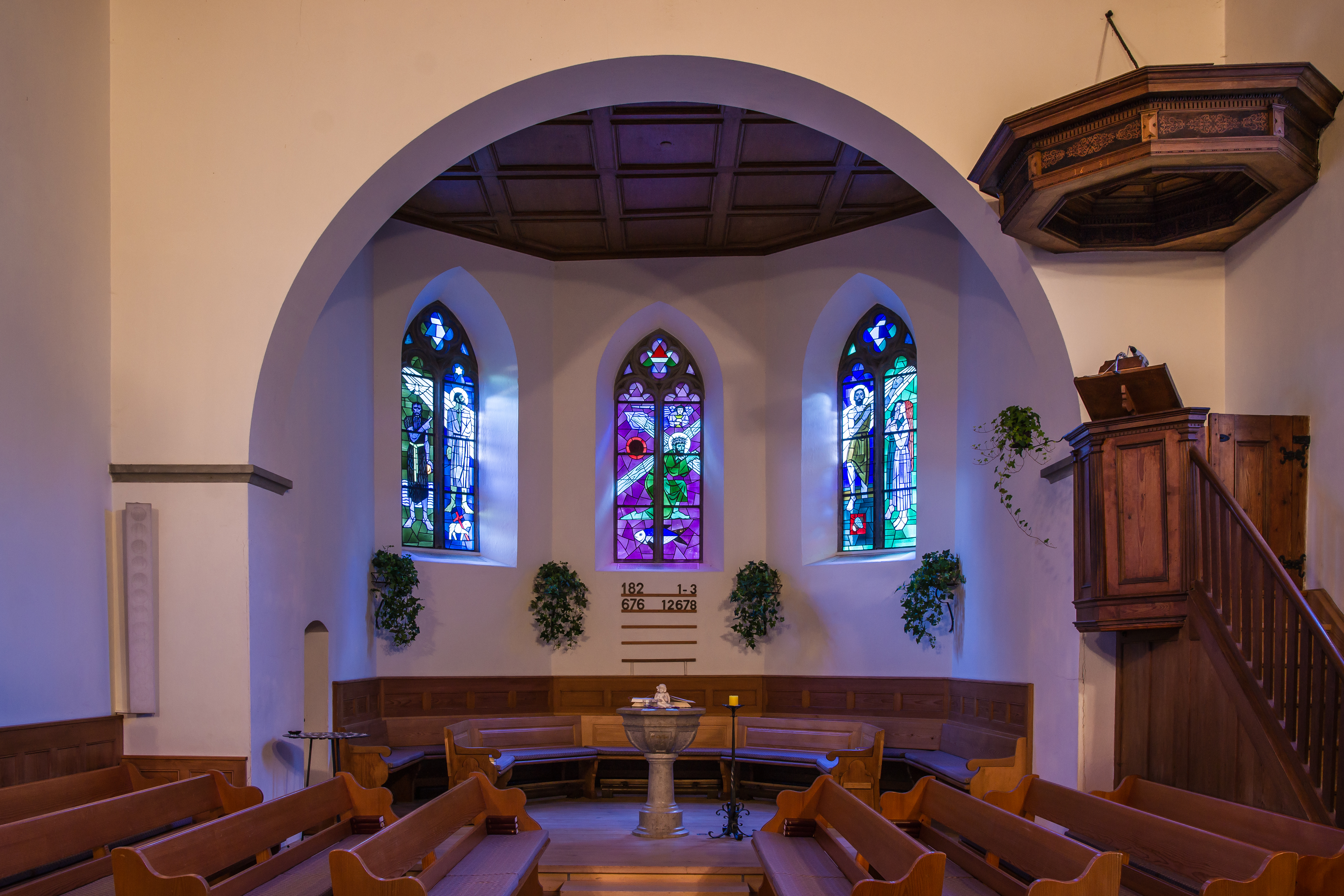
Interior of the Reformed Church in Eggiwil

From the 2000 census, 2,208 or 88.3% belonged to the Swiss Reformed Church, while 77 or 3.1% were Roman Catholic. Of the rest of the population, there was 1 member of an Orthodox church, and there were 55 individuals (or about 2.20% of the population) who belonged to another Christian church. There were 22 (or about 0.88% of the population) who were Muslim. There were 2 individuals who were Buddhist and 7 individuals who were Hindu. 43 (or about 1.72% of the population) belonged to no church, are agnostic or atheist, and 86 individuals (or about 3.44% of the population) did not answer the question.

During and after the Reformation time the persecuted Anabaptist met for several hundred years in hideouts and farm houses in the Eggiwil area. The Räblochhöhle, also called the Yoder-Cave was one hideout where they could meet without being detected be their persecutors.

== Education ==
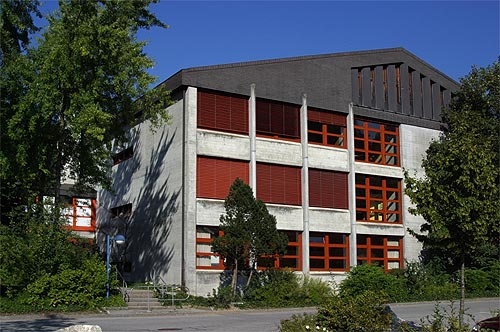
A school house in Eggiwil

In Eggiwil about 48.6% of the population have completed non-mandatory upper secondary education, and 10.6% have completed additional higher education (either university or a Fachhochschule). Of the 139 who had completed some form of tertiary schooling listed in the census, 74.8% were Swiss men, 23.7% were Swiss women.

The Canton of Bern school system provides one year of non-obligatory Kindergarten, followed by six years of Primary school. This is followed by three years of obligatory lower Secondary school where the students are separated according to ability and aptitude. Following the lower Secondary students may attend additional schooling or they may enter an apprenticeship.

During the 2011–12 school year, there were a total of 247 students attending classes in Eggiwil. There were 2 kindergarten classes with a total of 45 students in the municipality. Of the kindergarten students, 2.2% were permanent or temporary residents of Switzerland (not citizens). The municipality had 6 primary classes and 158 students. During the same year, there were 6 lower secondary classes with a total of 35 students. The remainder of the students attend a private or special school.

As of 2000, there were a total of 364 students attending any school in the municipality. Of those, 316 both lived and attended school in the municipality, while 48 students came from another municipality. During the same year, 99 residents attended schools outside the municipality.

Eggiwil is home to the Jugend- und Volksbibliothek Eggiwil library. The library has (as of 2008) 6,502 books or other media, and loaned out 29,721 items in the same year. It was open a total of 161 days with average of 5 hours per week during that year.
