= Alt-Signau Castle =

Castle in Bowil, Bern in Switzerland

Alt-Signau
- Ruine Alt-Signau
- Bowil
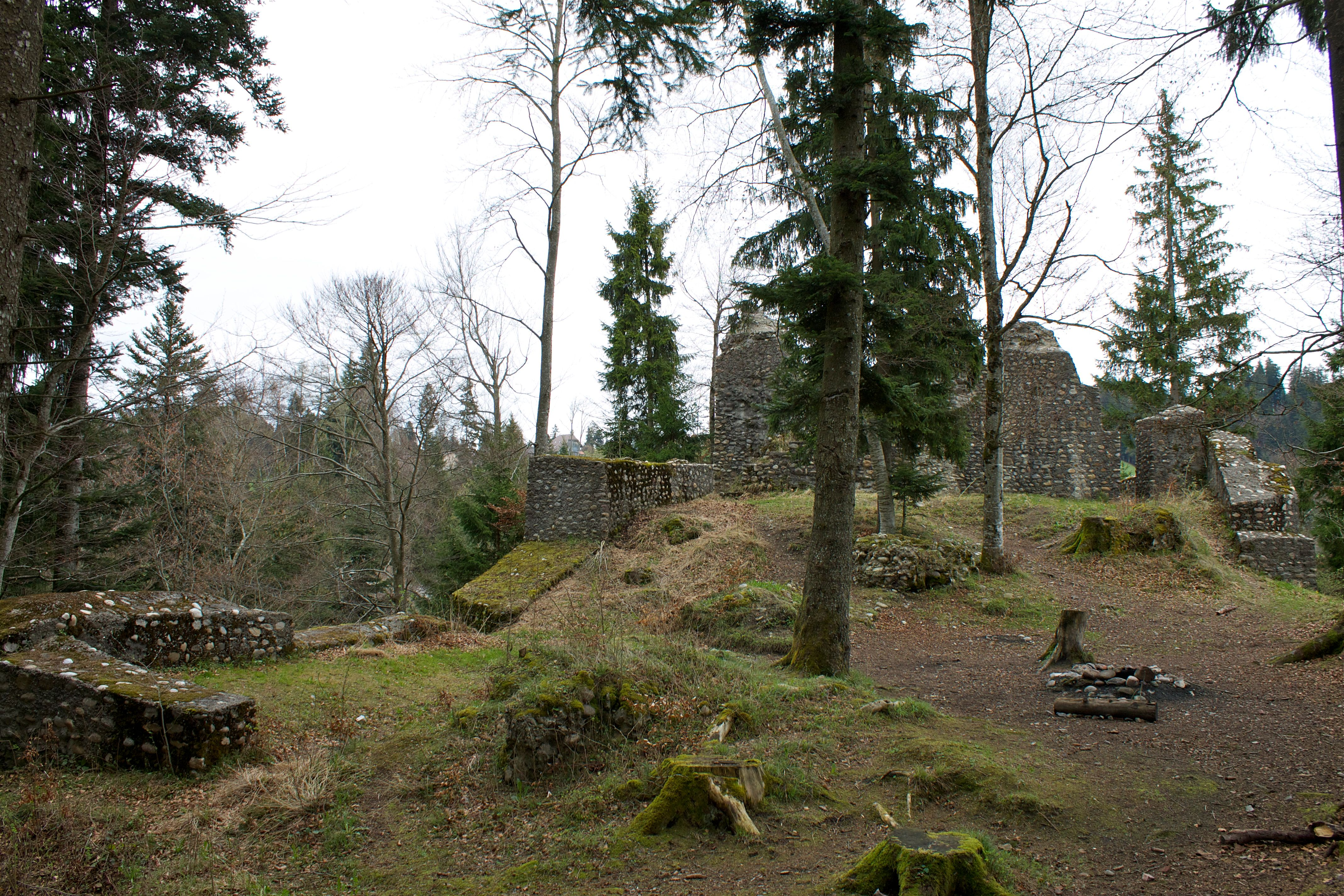
- The ruins of Alt-Signau, from the north-west

Site information
- Type: hill castle
- Code: CH-BE
- Condition: Ruined walls

Location
- Location within Switzerland
- Coordinates: 46°54′15″N 7°43′22″E

Site history
- Built: about 1130

Garrison information
- Occupants: Freiherren of Signau

Alt-Signau Castle (German: Ruine Alt-Signau) is a ruined castle in the municipality of Bowil in the canton of Bern in Switzerland.

== History ==
The castle was the ancestral home of the Barons of Signau. The family was first mentioned in 1130 when Werner von Signau appeared in a historical record. The castle was designed to protect and control the road between the Emmental and the Aare river. In the mid-14th century the castle was abandoned when the family moved to Neu-Signau Castle on a hill across the valley.

The ruin is relatively well preserved.

== See also ==
- List of castles in Switzerland
