= Oberthal, Switzerland =

Oberthal
- Municipality
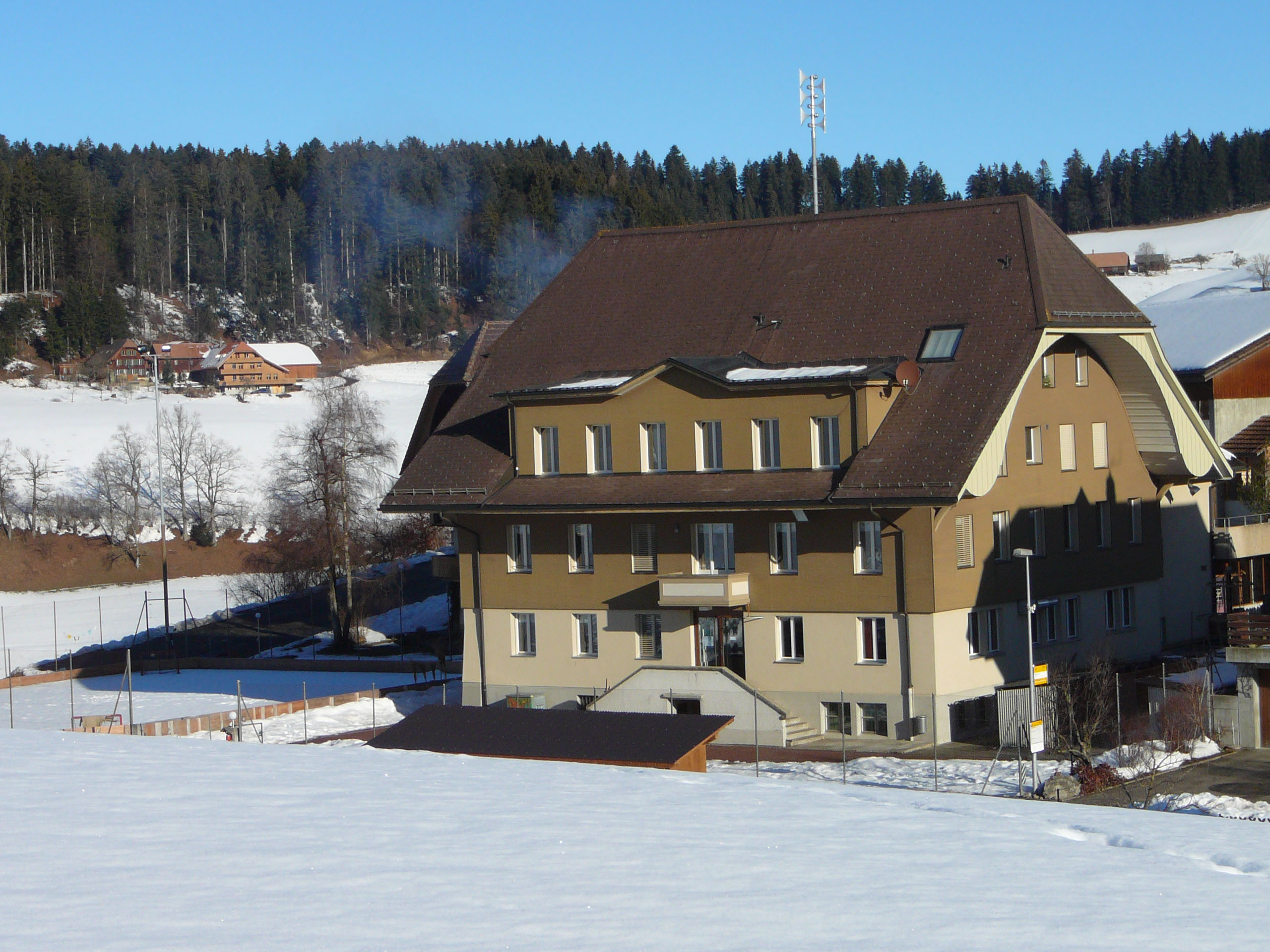
- Oberthal village schoolhouse

- Flag Coat of arms
- Location of Oberthal
- Location within Switzerland Location within Canton of Bern
- Coordinates: 46°55′N 7°40′E
- Country: Switzerland
- Canton: Bern
- District: Bern-Mittelland

Government
  - Executive: Gemeinderat with 5 members
  - Mayor: Gemeindepräsident(in); Christoph Zbinden (as of 2026)

Area
  - Total: 10.54 km^{2} (4.07 sq mi)
- Elevation: 822 m (2,697 ft)

Population (December 2020)
  - Total: 721
  - Density: 68.4/km^{2} (177/sq mi)
- Time zone: UTC+01:00 (CET)
  - Summer (DST): UTC+02:00 (CEST)
- Postal code: 3531
- SFOS number: 620
- ISO 3166 code: CH-BE
- Surrounded by: Arni, Bowil, Grosshöchstetten, Lauperswil, Signau, Zäziwil
- Website: oberthal.ch

Oberthal is a municipality in the Bern-Mittelland administrative district in the canton of Bern in Switzerland.

== History ==
Aerial view (1952)

Oberthal is first mentioned in 1275 as mons Obertal.

The oldest trace of a settlement in the area is the ruins of a castle on the Chnubel spur. However, no records of the castle have survived and nothing is known about it. The scattered villages and farms had a number of landlords including the Counts of Kyburg and the Herrschaft of Signau. In 1529, Bern gained control over the entire valley and made it part of the new district of Signau. It was part of the parish of Grosshöchstetten.

Beginning in the 19th century, many of the local farmers switched from raising grain and crops for local use to raising cattle for milk and cheese. To support the new dairy farmers a total of five dairies were built in the valley. However, a lack of jobs led to population decline as residents left for jobs in the growing cities and towns. Today about half of all jobs in the municipality are in agriculture. Additionally, over half of all residents commute to jobs in Bern or surrounding towns.

== Geography ==
Oberthal has an area of 10.54 km^{2} (4.07 sq mi). As of 2012, a total of 6.65 km^{2} (2.57 mi^{2}) or 63.1% is used for agricultural purposes, while 3.39 km^{2} (1.31 mi^{2}) or 32.2% is forested. Of the rest of the land, 0.57 km^{2} (0.22 mi^{2}) or 5.4% is settled (buildings or roads).

During the same year, housing and buildings made up 3.1% and transportation infrastructure made up 2.1%. Out of the forested land, 30.8% of the total land area is heavily forested and 1.3% is covered with orchards or small clusters of trees. Of the agricultural land, 20.4% is used for growing crops and 41.5% is pastures, while 1.2% is used for orchards or vine crops.

The municipality lacks a central village, instead it is made up of scattered settlements and farm houses on the Blasenfluh above the Kiesental (Kiesen Valley).

On 31 December 2009, Amtsbezirk Konolfingen, the municipality's former district, was dissolved. On the following day, 1 January 2010, it joined the newly created Verwaltungskreis Bern-Mittelland.

== Coat of arms ==
The blazon of the municipal coat of arms is Argent seven Mullets of Five, three and four, and a Mount of 3 Coupeaux Vert.

== Demographics ==
Oberthal has a population (as of December 2020) of 721. As of 2010, 1.3% of the population are resident foreign nationals. Over the last 10 years (2001–2011) the population has changed at a rate of -1.5%. Migration accounted for 0.1%, while births and deaths accounted for -1.3%.

Most of the population (as of 2000) speaks German (795 or 99.4%) as their first language, French is the second most common (2 or 0.3%) and English is the third (2 or 0.3%).

As of 2008, the population was 53.8% male and 46.2% female. The population was made up of 415 Swiss men (52.8% of the population) and 8 (1.0%) non-Swiss men. There were 361 Swiss women (45.9%) and 2 (0.3%) non-Swiss women. Of the population in the municipality, 407 or about 50.9% were born in Oberthal and lived there in 2000. There were 307 or 38.4% who were born in the same canton, while 47 or 5.9% were born somewhere else in Switzerland, and 20 or 2.5% were born outside of Switzerland.

As of 2011, children and teenagers (0–19 years old) make up 21.8% of the population, while adults (20–64 years old) make up 60.9% and seniors (over 64 years old) make up 17.3%.

As of 2000, there were 372 people who were single and never married in the municipality. There were 370 married individuals, 47 widows or widowers and 11 individuals who are divorced.

As of 2000, there were 91 households that consist of only one person and 43 households with five or more people. In 2000, a total of 284 apartments (88.2% of the total) were permanently occupied, while 28 apartments (8.7%) were seasonally occupied and 10 apartments (3.1%) were empty. As of 2010, the construction rate of new housing units was 3.8 new units per 1000 residents. The vacancy rate for the municipality, in 2011, was 0.83%.

The historical population is given in the following chart:

== Politics ==
In the 2011 federal election, the most popular party was the Swiss People's Party (SVP) which received 43.6% of the vote. The next three most popular parties were the Conservative Democratic Party (BDP) (27.6%), the Social Democratic Party (SP) (5.5%) and the Green Party (4.5%). In the federal election, a total of 324 votes were cast, and the voter turnout was 51.6%.

== Economy ==
As of 2011, Oberthal had an unemployment rate of 0.89%. As of 2008, there were a total of 357 people employed in the municipality. Of these, there were 181 people employed in the primary economic sector and about 63 businesses involved in this sector. 78 people were employed in the secondary sector and there were 11 businesses in this sector. 98 people were employed in the tertiary sector, with 7 businesses in this sector. There were 437 residents of the municipality who were employed in some capacity, of which females made up 37.3% of the workforce.

In 2008, there were a total of 236 full-time equivalent jobs. The number of jobs in the primary sector was 106, all of which were in agriculture. The number of jobs in the secondary sector was 70 of which 12 or (17.1%) were in manufacturing and 58 (82.9%) were in construction. The number of jobs in the tertiary sector was 60. In the tertiary sector; 22 or 36.7% were in a hotel or restaurant, 8 or 13.3% were in education and 26 or 43.3% were in health care.

In 2000, there were 58 workers who commuted into the municipality and 245 workers who commuted away. The municipality is a net exporter of workers, with about 4.2 workers leaving the municipality for every one entering. Of the working population, 14% used public transportation to get to work, and 48.1% used a private car.

== Religion ==
From the 2000 census, 692 or 86.5% belonged to the Swiss Reformed Church, while 25 or 3.1% were Roman Catholic. Of the rest of the population, there were 53 individuals (or about 6.63% of the population) who belonged to another Christian church. There was 1 individual who was Islamic. 34 (or about 4.25% of the population) belonged to no church, are agnostic or atheist, and 21 individuals (or about 2.63% of the population) did not answer the question.

== Education ==
In Oberthal, about 280 or (35.0%) of the population have completed non-mandatory upper secondary education, and 79 or (9.9%) have completed additional higher education (either university or a Fachhochschule). Of the 79 who completed tertiary schooling, 77.2% were Swiss men, 20.3% were Swiss women.

The Canton of Bern school system provides one year of non-obligatory Kindergarten, followed by six years of Primary school. This is followed by three years of obligatory lower Secondary school where the students are separated according to ability and aptitude. Following the lower Secondary students may attend additional schooling or they may enter an apprenticeship.

During the 2010–11 school year, there were a total of 70 students attending classes in Oberthal. There was one kindergarten class with a total of 21 students in the municipality. The municipality had 2 primary classes and 35 students. During the same year, there was one lower secondary class with a total of 14 students.

As of 2000, there were 5 students in Oberthal who came from another municipality, while 37 residents attended schools outside the municipality.
