= Bowil =

- Municipality
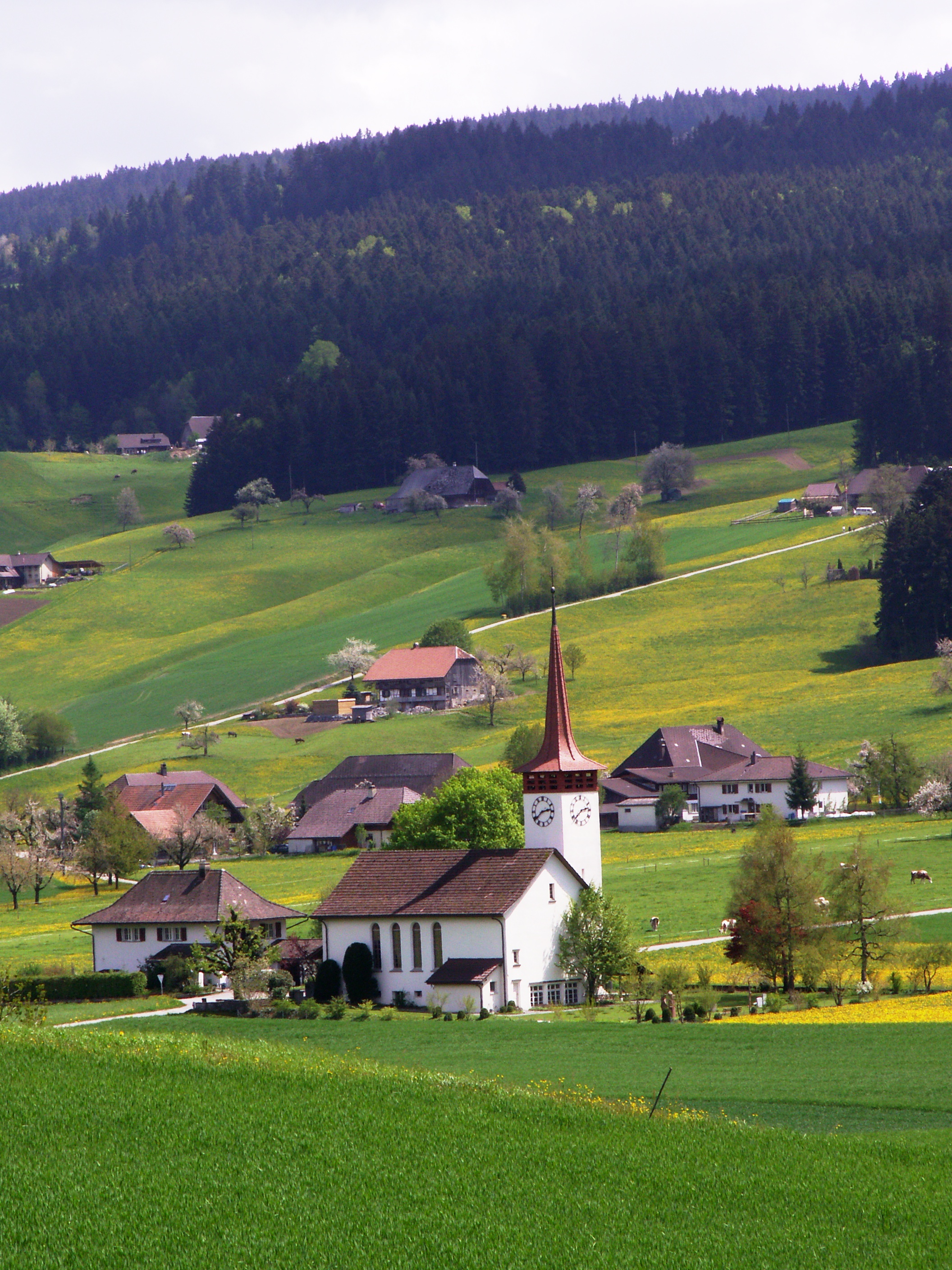

- Flag Coat of arms
- Location of Bowil
- Location within Switzerland Location within Canton of Bern
- Coordinates: 46°54′N 7°42′E
- Country: Switzerland
- Canton: Bern
- District: Bern-Mittelland

Government
  - Executive: Gemeinderat with 5 members
  - Mayor: Gemeindepräsident; Manuel Lüscher (as of 2026)

Area
  - Total: 14.7 km^{2} (5.7 sq mi)
- Elevation: 733 m (2,405 ft)

Population (December 2020)
  - Total: 1,354
  - Density: 92.1/km^{2} (239/sq mi)
- Time zone: UTC+01:00 (CET)
  - Summer (DST): UTC+02:00 (CEST)
- Postal code: 3533
- SFOS number: 605
- ISO 3166 code: CH-BE
- Surrounded by: Linden, Oberhünigen, Oberthal, Röthenbach im Emmental, Signau, Zäziwil
- Website: www.bowil.ch

Bowil is a municipality in the Bern-Mittelland administrative district in the canton of Bern in Switzerland.

== History ==
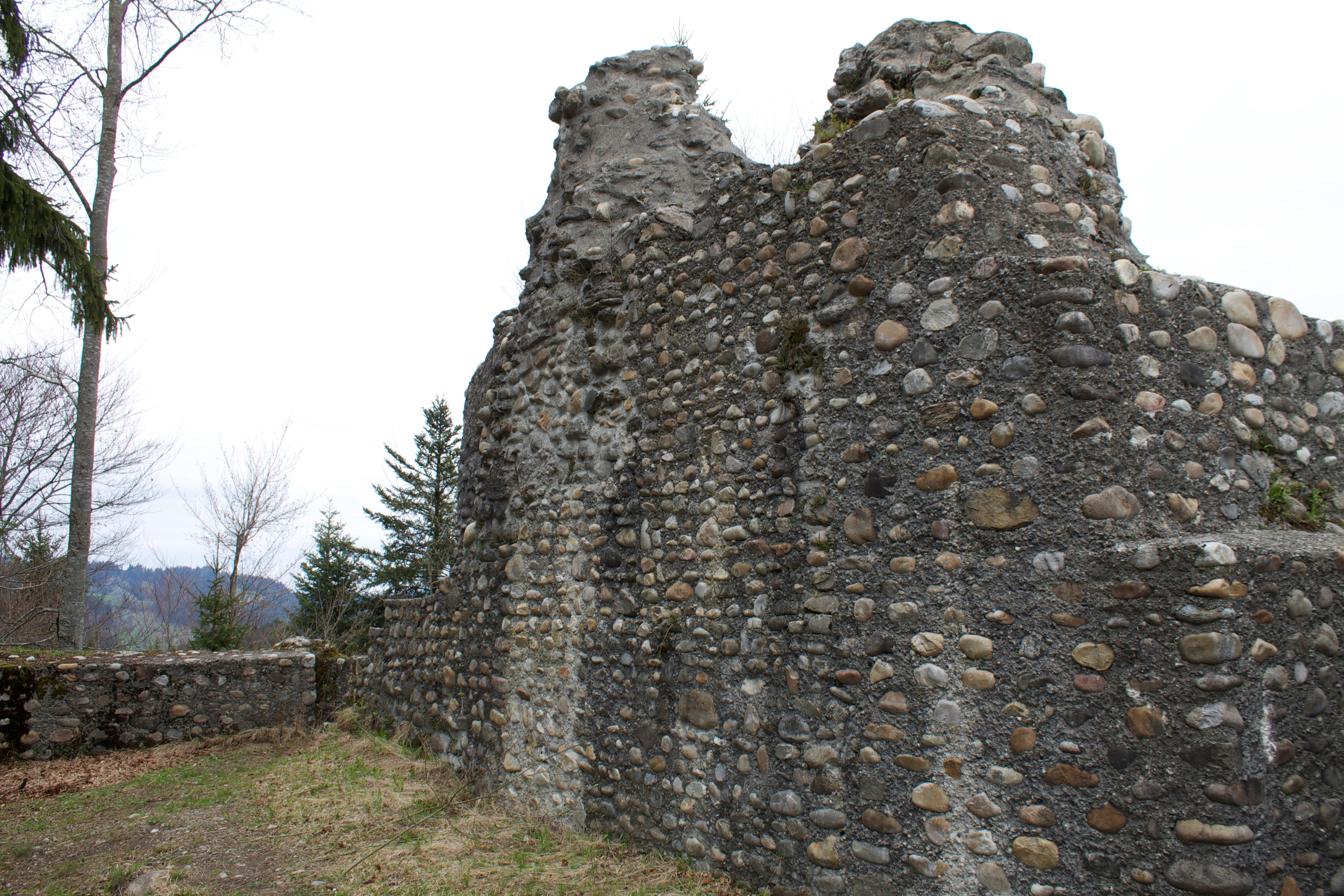
Ruins of Alt-Signau

Bowil is first mentioned in 1299 as Bonwile.

The village was once part of the Herrschaft of Signau and the Freiherren of Signau built their castles, Alt-Signau and Neu-Signau, between Bowil and Signau villages. Today, the municipal border has been redrawn and the ruins of both castles are in Bowil. During the Middle Ages, Bowil was part of the lands of the Freiherr of Signau, but other distant landowners and local farmers owned rights or property in the village. In 1528, Bern adopted the Protestant Reformation and Bowil quickly followed. However, in the following years, it became a haven for Anabaptists. In 1720, to try to convert the Anabaptists to the Swiss Reformed faith, Bern established a filial church in the village. In 1930 that church became a parish church over the parish of Bowil-Oberthal.

Traditionally the village economy relied on subsistence agriculture. However, in the late 18th century local farmers began to raise grass which they could harvest as hay for cattle. By the 19th century, dairy farming had replaced traditional agriculture. In 1901 a railway station connected the village to the rest of the country. The easy transportation connection encouraged small factories to move into Bowil. However, in 1990 one-third of the jobs in the village were still in agriculture.

== Geography ==
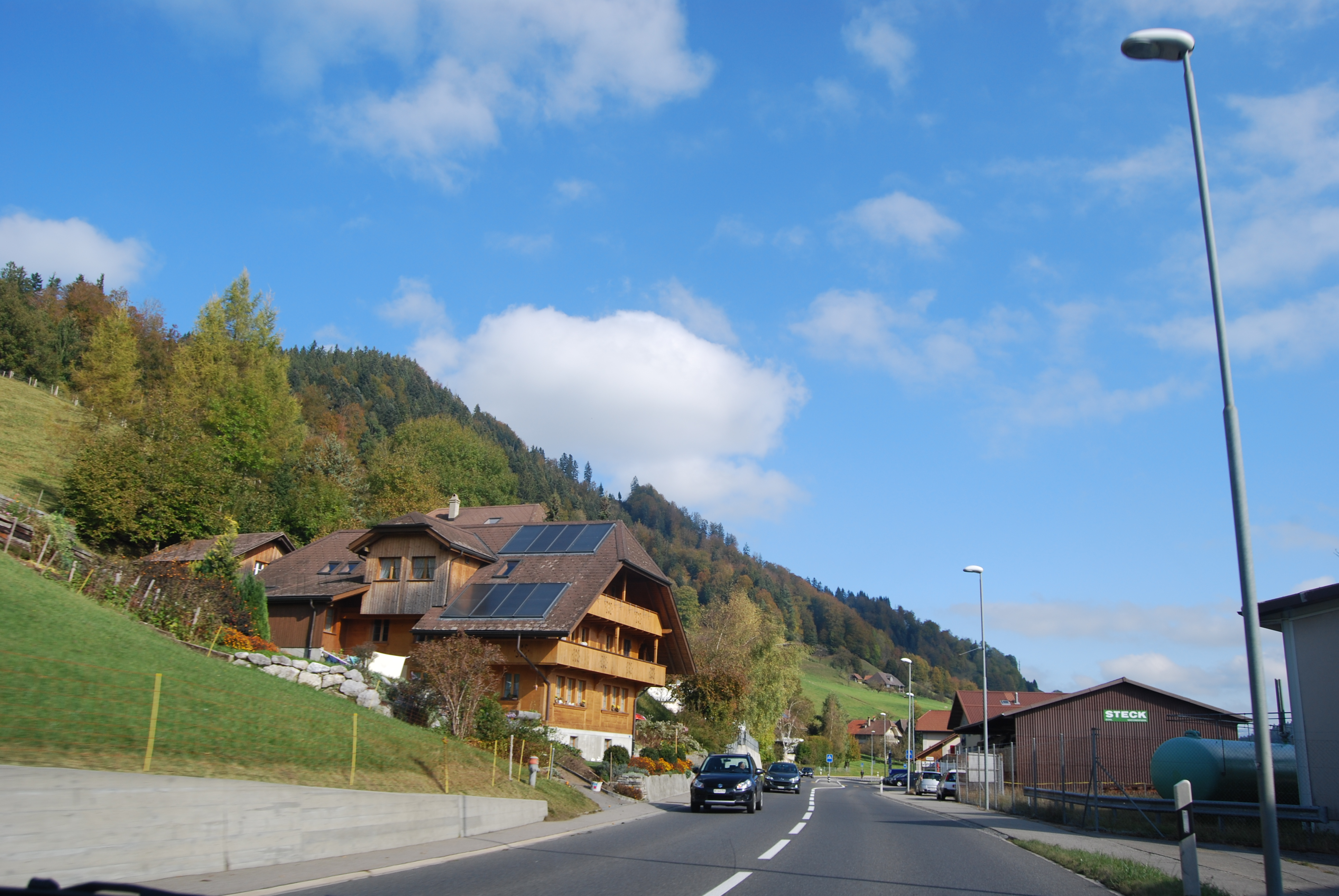
Bowil village and surrounding hills

Bowil has an area of 14.69 km^{2} (5.67 sq mi). Of this area, 8.08 km^{2} (3.12 mi^{2}) or 55.0% is used for agricultural purposes, while 5.81 km^{2} (2.24 mi^{2}) or 39.6% is forested. Of the rest of the land, 0.75 km^{2} (0.29 mi^{2}) or 5.1% is settled (buildings or roads), 0.06 km^{2} (15 acres) or 0.4% is either rivers or lakes.

Of the built up area, housing and buildings made up 2.9% and transportation infrastructure made up 1.6%. Out of the forested land, 37.9% of the total land area is heavily forested and 1.6% is covered with orchards or small clusters of trees. Of the agricultural land, 20.3% is used for growing crops and 33.4% is pastures, while 1.3% is used for orchards or vine crops. All the water in the municipality is flowing water.

It is located between the Aare River and the Emme River. The southern border is the Kurzenberg, while the northern is along the Blasenfluh river. The municipality includes the village of Bowil, Oberhofen, Rünkhofen and Steinen as well as several clusters of houses and individual farm houses.

On 31 December 2009 Amtsbezirk Konolfingen, the municipality's former district, was dissolved. On the following day, 1 January 2010, it joined the newly created Verwaltungskreis Bern-Mittelland.

== Coat of arms ==
The blazon of the municipal coat of arms is Or three Fir Twigs Vert issuant from a Mount of 3 Coupeaux Gules.

== Demographics ==
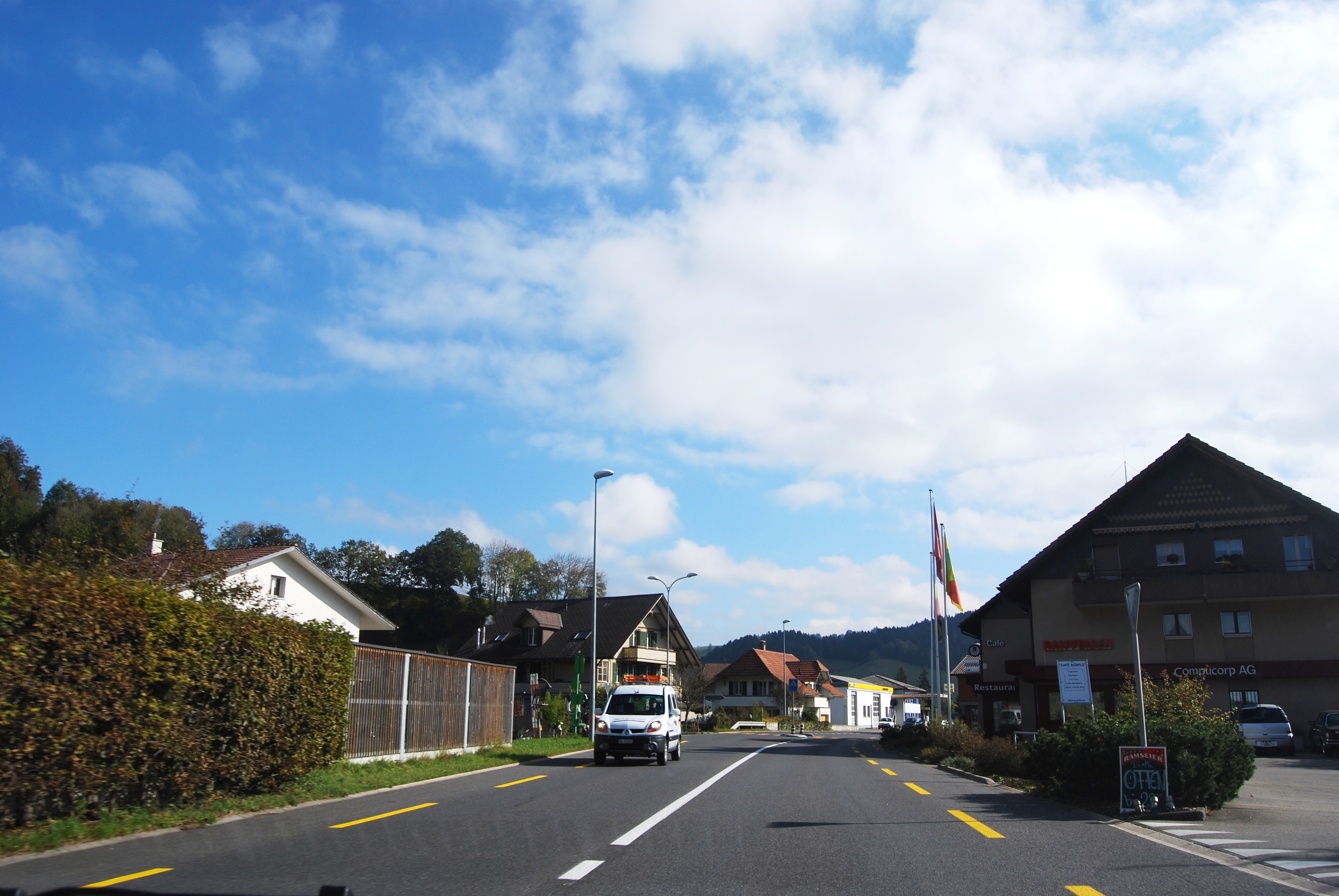
Bowil village

Bowil has a population (as of December 2020) of 1,354. As of 2010, 2.0% of the population are resident foreign nationals. Over the last 10 years (2000-2010) the population has changed at a rate of 0.8%. Migration accounted for -1.3%, while births and deaths accounted for 2.3%.

Most of the population (as of 2000) speaks German (1,317 or 98.4%) as their first language, Albanian is the second most common (7 or 0.5%) and English is the third (5 or 0.4%). There are 3 people who speak French.

As of 2008, the population was 51.6% male and 48.4% female. The population was made up of 683 Swiss men (50.3% of the population) and 18 (1.3%) non-Swiss men. There were 648 Swiss women (47.7%) and 9 (0.7%) non-Swiss women. Of the population in the municipality, 619 or about 46.2% were born in Bowil and lived there in 2000. There were 560 or 41.8% who were born in the same canton, while 82 or 6.1% were born somewhere else in Switzerland, and 45 or 3.4% were born outside of Switzerland.

As of 2010, children and teenagers (0–19 years old) make up 23.1% of the population, while adults (20–64 years old) make up 60.9% and seniors (over 64 years old) make up 16%.

As of 2000, there were 594 people who were single and never married in the municipality. There were 632 married individuals, 77 widows or widowers and 36 individuals who are divorced.

As of 2000, there were 130 households that consist of only one person and 64 households with five or more people. In 2000, a total of 481 apartments (88.3% of the total) were permanently occupied, while 35 apartments (6.4%) were seasonally occupied and 29 apartments (5.3%) were empty. As of 2010, the construction rate of new housing units was 2.2 new units per 1000 residents. The vacancy rate for the municipality, in 2011, was 2.88%.

The historical population is given in the following chart:

== Heritage sites of national significance ==
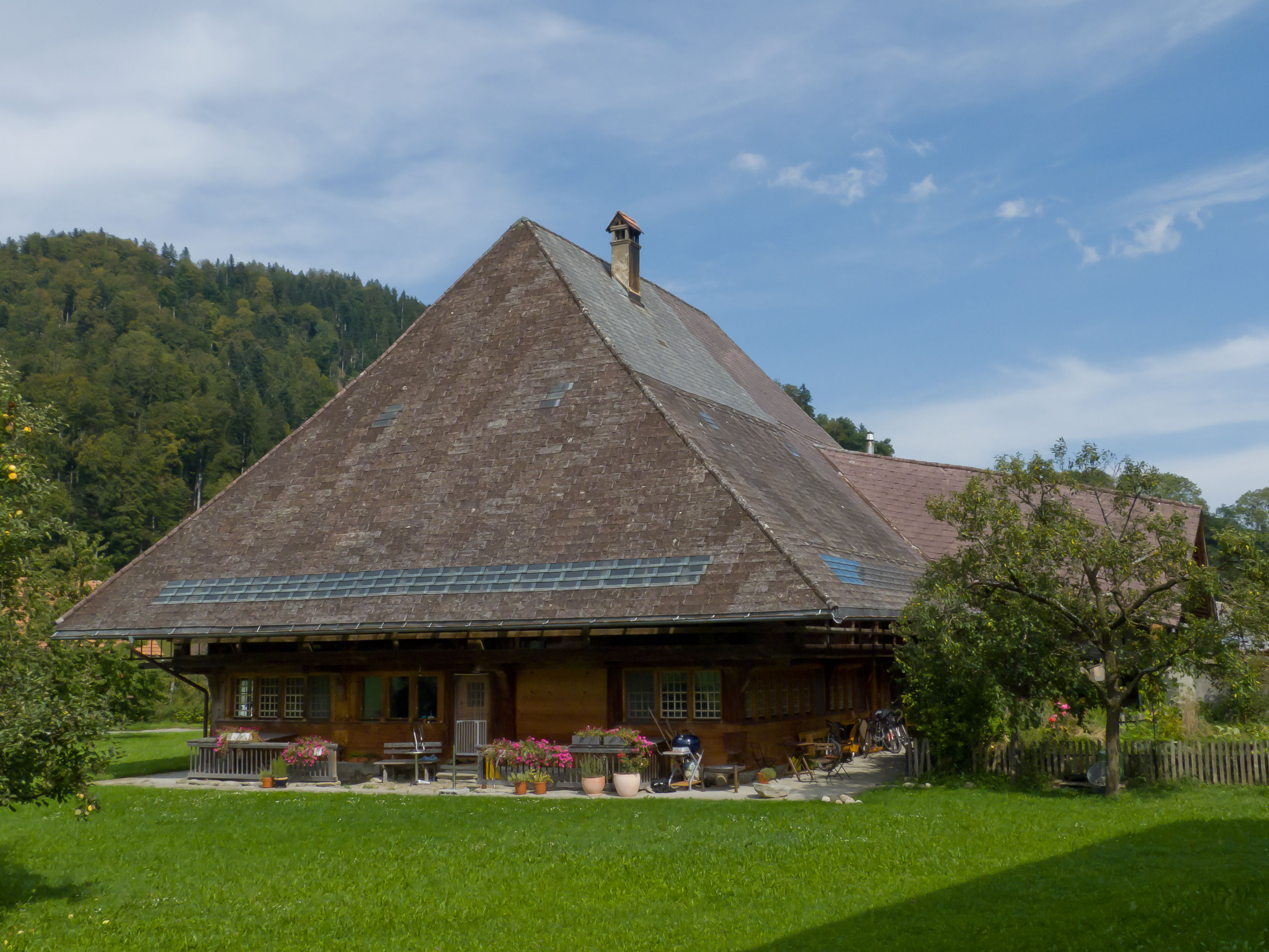
Hochstud House in Bowil

The Hochstud house is listed as a Swiss heritage site of national significance.

== Politics ==
In the 2011 federal election the most popular party was the Swiss People's Party (SVP) which received 47.8% of the vote. The next three most popular parties were the Conservative Democratic Party (BDP) (17.1%), the Social Democratic Party (SP) (11.7%) and the Evangelical People's Party (EVP) (6.9%). In the federal election, a total of 557 votes were cast, and the voter turnout was 50.7%.

== Economy ==
Ferdinand Steck Maschinenfabrik, a manufacturer of specialist road building and railway equipment, is based in Bowil.

As of 2011, Bowil had an unemployment rate of 0.76%. As of 2008, there were a total of 397 people employed in the municipality. Of these, there were 152 people employed in the primary economic sector and about 59 businesses involved in this sector. 106 people were employed in the secondary sector and there were 15 businesses in this sector. 139 people were employed in the tertiary sector, with 29 businesses in this sector. There were 670 residents of the municipality who were employed in some capacity, of which females made up 38.1% of the workforce.

In 2008 there were a total of 301 full-time equivalent jobs. The number of jobs in the primary sector was 98, all of which were in agriculture. The number of jobs in the secondary sector was 96 of which 58 or (60.4%) were in manufacturing and 38 (39.6%) were in construction. The number of jobs in the tertiary sector was 107. In the tertiary sector; 31 or 29.0% were in wholesale or retail sales or the repair of motor vehicles, 12 or 11.2% were in a hotel or restaurant, 7 or 6.5% were the insurance or financial industry, 6 or 5.6% were technical professionals or scientists, 10 or 9.3% were in education and 2 or 1.9% were in health care.

In 2000, there were 142 workers who commuted into the municipality and 438 workers who commuted away. The municipality is a net exporter of workers, with about 3.1 workers leaving the municipality for every one entering. Of the working population, 11% used public transportation to get to work, and 56.1% used a private car.

== Religion ==
From the 2000 census, 1,167 or 87.2% belonged to the Swiss Reformed Church, while 41 or 3.1% were Roman Catholic. Of the rest of the population, there were 3 members of an Orthodox church (or about 0.22% of the population), and there were 83 individuals (or about 6.20% of the population) who belonged to another Christian church. There were 18 (or about 1.34% of the population) who were Islamic. There were 2 individuals who were Buddhist. 34 (or about 2.54% of the population) belonged to no church, are agnostic or atheist, and 30 individuals (or about 2.24% of the population) did not answer the question.

== Education ==
In Bowil about 479 or (35.8%) of the population have completed non-mandatory upper secondary education, and 87 or (6.5%) have completed additional higher education (either university or a Fachhochschule). Of the 87 who completed tertiary schooling, 72.4% were Swiss men, 24.1% were Swiss women.

The Canton of Bern school system provides one year of non-obligatory Kindergarten, followed by six years of Primary school. This is followed by three years of obligatory lower Secondary school where the students are separated according to ability and aptitude. Following the lower Secondary students may attend additional schooling or they may enter an apprenticeship.

During the 2010–11 school year, there were a total of 129 students attending classes in Bowil. There were 2 kindergarten classes with a total of 16 students in the municipality. Of the kindergarten students, 6.3% were permanent or temporary residents of Switzerland (not citizens) and 18.8% have a different mother language than the classroom language. The municipality had 6 primary classes and 94 students. During the same year, there was one lower secondary class with a total of 19 students. 5.3% have a different mother language than the classroom language.

As of 2000, there were 60 students in Bowil who came from another municipality, while 63 residents attended schools outside the municipality.

Bowil is home to the Schul- und Gemeindebibliothek Bowil (municipal library of Bowil). The library has (as of 2008) 5,790 books or other media, and loaned out 13,362 items in the same year. It was open a total of 151 days with average of 7 hours per week during that year.
