= Arni, Bern =

Arni
- Municipality
- Flag Coat of arms
- Location of Arni
- Location within Switzerland Location within Canton of Bern
- Coordinates: 46°56′N 7°40′E
- Country: Switzerland
- Canton: Bern
- District: Bern-Mittelland administrative district

Government
  - Executive: Gemeinderat with 7 members
  - Mayor: Gemeindepräsident; Simon Liechti (as of 2026)

Area
  - Total: 10.4 km^{2} (4.0 sq mi)
- Elevation: 849 m (2,785 ft)

Population (December 2020)
  - Total: 936
  - Density: 90.0/km^{2} (233/sq mi)
- Time zone: UTC+01:00 (CET)
  - Summer (DST): UTC+02:00 (CEST)
- Postal code: 3508
- SFOS number: 602
- ISO 3166 code: CH-BE
- Surrounded by: Biglen, Grosshöchstetten, Landiswil, Lauperswil, Oberthal, Walkringen
- Website: www.arnibe.ch

Arni (High Alemannic: Aarni) is a municipality in the Bern-Mittelland administrative district in the canton of Bern in Switzerland.

== History ==
Arni is first mentioned in 1185 as Arne. The village was probably acquired by Bern in 1399 and placed in the Signau Herrschaft. The Herrschaft was abolished in 1529 and the village became a Bernese bailiwick. Following the 1798 French invasion, Arni became part of the Helvetic Republic district of Höchstetten. When the Helvetic Republic collapsed in 1803, with the Act of Mediation Arni was assigned to the Konolfingen district. Today the village is still mostly agricultural, with nearly half of all jobs in farming.

== Geography ==
Aerial view by Walter Mittelholzer (1923)

Arni has an area of 10.43 km^{2} (4.03 sq mi). Of this area, 7.15 km^{2} (2.76 mi^{2}) or 68.5% is used for agricultural purposes, while 2.67 km^{2} (1.03 mi^{2}) or 25.6% is forested. Of the rest of the land, 0.58 km^{2} (0.22 mi^{2}) or 5.6% is settled (buildings or roads), 0.01 km^{2} (2.5 acres) or 0.1% is either rivers or lakes.

Of the built up area, housing and buildings made up 3.8% and transportation infrastructure made up 1.5%. Out of the forested land, all of the forested land area is covered with heavy forests. Of the agricultural land, 35.9% is used for growing crops and 31.3% is pastures, while 1.2% is used for orchards or vine crops. All the water in the municipality is flowing water.

The municipality includes the village of Arni, the industrial center of Arnisäge and the hamlets of Lütiwil and Roth.

On 31 December 2009 Amtsbezirk Konolfingen, the municipality's former district, was dissolved. On the following day, 1 January 2010, it joined the newly created Verwaltungskreis Bern-Mittelland.

== Coat of arms ==
The blazon of the municipal coat of arms is Per Fess Argent a Fleur de Lis Or and of the second a Crescent of the first.

== Demographics ==
Arni has a population (as of December 2020) of 936. As of 2010, 3.4% of the population are resident foreign nationals. Over the last 10 years (2000-2010) the population has changed at a rate of -5.3%. Migration accounted for -8%, while births and deaths accounted for 1%.

Most of the population (as of 2000) speaks German (960 or 97.0%) as their first language, Serbo-Croatian is the second most common (6 or 0.6%) and French is the third (5 or 0.5%). There are 3 people who speak Italian.

As of 2008, the population was 50.7% male and 49.3% female. The population was made up of 461 Swiss men (48.8% of the population) and 18 (1.9%) non-Swiss men. There were 452 Swiss women (47.8%) and 14 (1.5%) non-Swiss women. Of the population in the municipality, 446 or about 45.1% were born in Arni and lived there in 2000. There were 360 or 36.4% who were born in the same canton, while 111 or 11.2% were born somewhere else in Switzerland, and 51 or 5.2% were born outside of Switzerland.

As of 2010, children and teenagers (0–19 years old) make up 20.4% of the population, while adults (20–64 years old) make up 63.7% and seniors (over 64 years old) make up 15.9%.

As of 2000, there were 447 people who were single and never married in the municipality. There were 473 married individuals, 47 widows or widowers and 23 individuals who are divorced.

As of 2000, there were 84 households that consist of only one person and 50 households with five or more people. In 2000, a total of 353 apartments (90.1% of the total) were permanently occupied, while 28 apartments (7.1%) were seasonally occupied and 11 apartments (2.8%) were empty.

The historical population is given in the following chart:

== Sights ==
The entire hamlet of Hämlismatt is designated as part of the Inventory of Swiss Heritage Sites.

== Politics ==
In the 2011 federal election the most popular party was the Swiss People's Party (SVP) which received 52.7% of the vote. The next three most popular parties were the Conservative Democratic Party (BDP) (15.2%), the Social Democratic Party (SP) (7.3%) and the Green Party (6.1%). In the federal election, a total of 374 votes were cast, and the voter turnout was 47.0%.

== Economy ==
As of 2011, Arni had an unemployment rate of 1.17%. As of 2008, there were a total of 279 people employed in the municipality. Of these, there were 147 people employed in the primary economic sector and about 55 businesses involved in this sector. 41 people were employed in the secondary sector and there were 15 businesses in this sector. 91 people were employed in the tertiary sector, with 13 businesses in this sector. There were 524 residents of the municipality who were employed in some capacity, of which females made up 42.2% of the workforce.

In 2008 there were a total of 212 full-time equivalent jobs. The number of jobs in the primary sector was 99, all of which were in agriculture. The number of jobs in the secondary sector was 37 of which 19 or (51.4%) were in manufacturing and 18 (48.6%) were in construction. The number of jobs in the tertiary sector was 76. In the tertiary sector; 52 or 68.4% were in wholesale or retail sales or the repair of motor vehicles, 2 or 2.6% were in the movement and storage of goods, 7 or 9.2% were in a hotel or restaurant, 1 was in the information industry, 3 or 3.9% were technical professionals or scientists, 9 or 11.8% were in education and 1 was in health care.

In 2000, there were 39 workers who commuted into the municipality and 304 workers who commuted away. The municipality is a net exporter of workers, with about 7.8 workers leaving the municipality for every one entering. Of the working population, 7.3% used public transportation to get to work, and 54.4% used a private car.

== Religion ==
From the 2000 census, 42 or 4.2% were Roman Catholic, while 825 or 83.3% belonged to the Swiss Reformed Church. Of the rest of the population, there were 3 members of an Orthodox church (or about 0.30% of the population), and there were 80 individuals (or about 8.08% of the population) who belonged to another Christian church. There were 18 (or about 1.82% of the population) who were Islamic. There were 1 individual who belonged to another church. 45 (or about 4.55% of the population) belonged to no church, are agnostic or atheist, and 16 individuals (or about 1.62% of the population) did not answer the question.

== Education ==
In Arni about 383 or (38.7%) of the population have completed non-mandatory upper secondary education, and 94 or (9.5%) have completed additional higher education (either university or a Fachhochschule). Of the 94 who completed tertiary schooling, 68.1% were Swiss men, 26.6% were Swiss women.

The Canton of Bern school system provides one year of non-obligatory Kindergarten, followed by six years of Primary school. This is followed by three years of obligatory lower Secondary school where the students are separated according to ability and aptitude. Following the lower Secondary students may attend additional schooling or they may enter an apprenticeship.

During the 2010-11 school year, there were a total of 100 students attending classes in Arni. There was one kindergarten class with a total of 21 students in the municipality. The municipality had 3 primary classes and 64 students. During the same year, there was one lower secondary class with a total of 15 students. There were 6.7% who were permanent or temporary residents of Switzerland (not citizens) and 6.7% have a different mother language than the classroom language.

As of 2000, there were 11 students in Arni who came from another municipality, while 47 residents attended schools outside the municipality.
