= Signau =

- Municipality
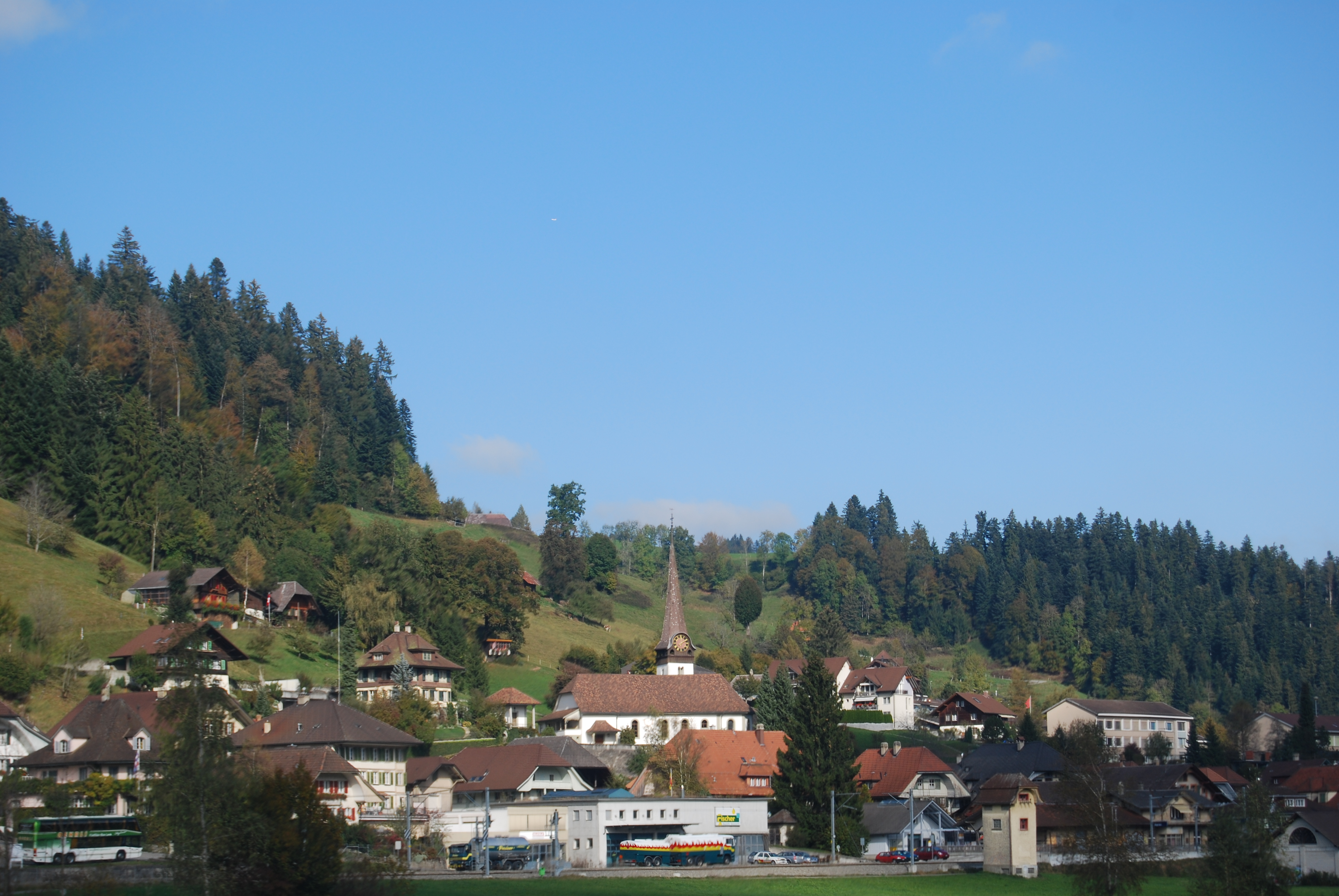
- Signau village

- Flag Coat of arms
- Location of Signau
- Location within Switzerland Location within Canton of Bern
- Coordinates: 46°55′N 7°44′E
- Country: Switzerland
- Canton: Bern
- District: Emmental

Government
  - Executive: Gemeinderat with 7 members
  - Mayor: Gemeindepräsident(in); Arno Jutzi SPS/PSS (as of 2026)

Area
  - Total: 22.1 km^{2} (8.5 sq mi)
- Elevation: 683 m (2,241 ft)

Population (December 2020)
  - Total: 2,594
  - Density: 117/km^{2} (304/sq mi)
- Time zone: UTC+01:00 (CET)
  - Summer (DST): UTC+02:00 (CEST)
- Postal code: 3534
- SFOS number: 0907
- ISO 3166 code: CH-BE
- Surrounded by: Lauperswil, Langnau im Emmental, Eggiwil, Röthenbach im Emmental, Bowil, Oberthal
- Website: www.signau.ch

Signau is a municipality in the administrative district of Emmental in the canton of Bern in Switzerland.

== History ==
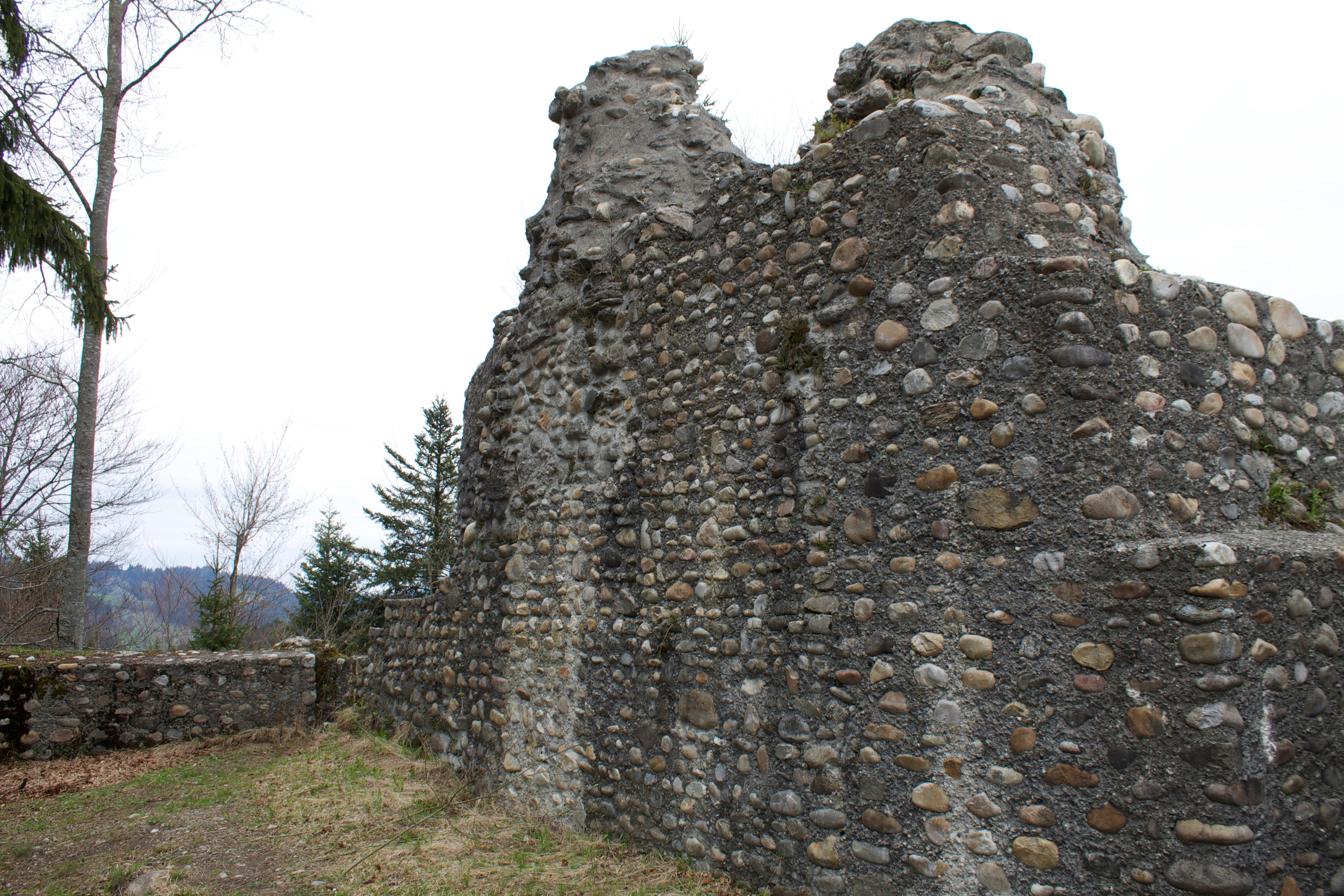
Ruins of Alt-Signau Castle

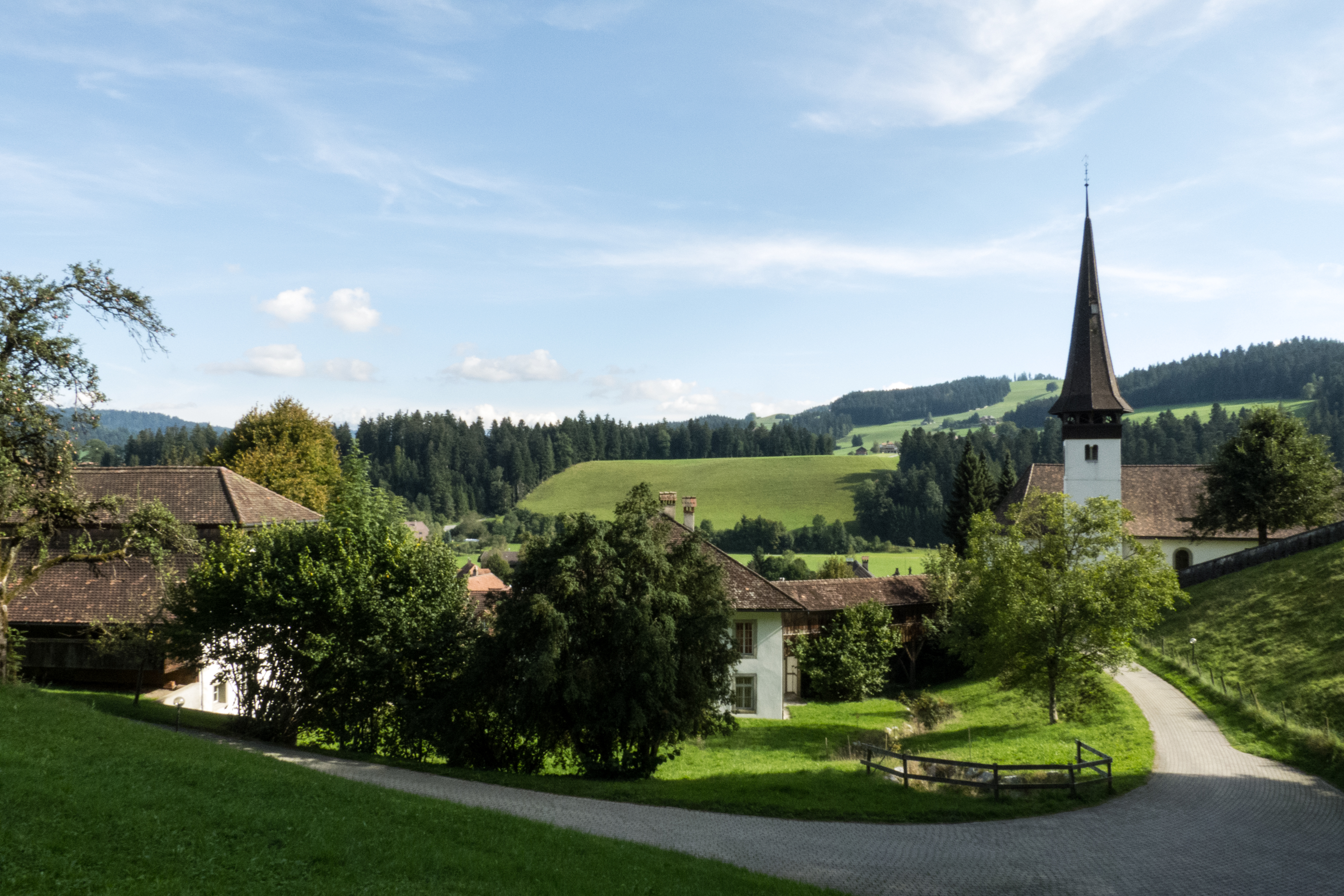
The village church of Signau

Signau is first mentioned between 1130 and 1146 as Sigenowo.

Scattered mesolithic, Bronze Age and medieval artifacts indicate a long history of settlements in the area. By the High Middle Ages the Lords of Schweinsberg-Attinghausen had built their ancestral castle above the village. The remains of possibly four other earthen fortifications have been discovered around the area. Though the Schweinsberg-Attinghausen castle fell into ruins in 13th or 14th century, the village with Alt- and Neu-Signau Castles (today in Bowil municipality) formed the center of the Herrschaft of Signau. The Barons of Signau built St. Mary's Church in Signau as the parish church for the parish. In 1529 the city of Bern acquired the village and Herrschaft of Signau. In 1648, the village of Eggiwil left the Signau parish to form its own parish and eventually it politically split to become an independent municipality. The village church was renovated and rebuilt in 1850.

By 1622 Signau had a yearly market in the fall. Two other yearly markets were added in the 18th century. By 1800 the town was home to a number of industries and businesses in addition to the farmers and livestock herders who lived there. In 1856 the Schüpbach canal drained the swampy valley floor and opened up additional farm land. In 1864 the Bern-Langnau railroad connected Signau to the growing Swiss rail network. The first line was followed in 1875 by the Langnau-Lucerne line. The good rail and road connections encouraged industry to settle in the town. By 2005, agriculture provided about one-third of all jobs in the community.

There are several primary schools scattered around the municipality in Höhe, Häleschwand, Mutten and Schüpbach. The secondary school in Signau pulls in students from Röthenbach, Eggiwil and Bowil as well as Signau.

== Geography ==
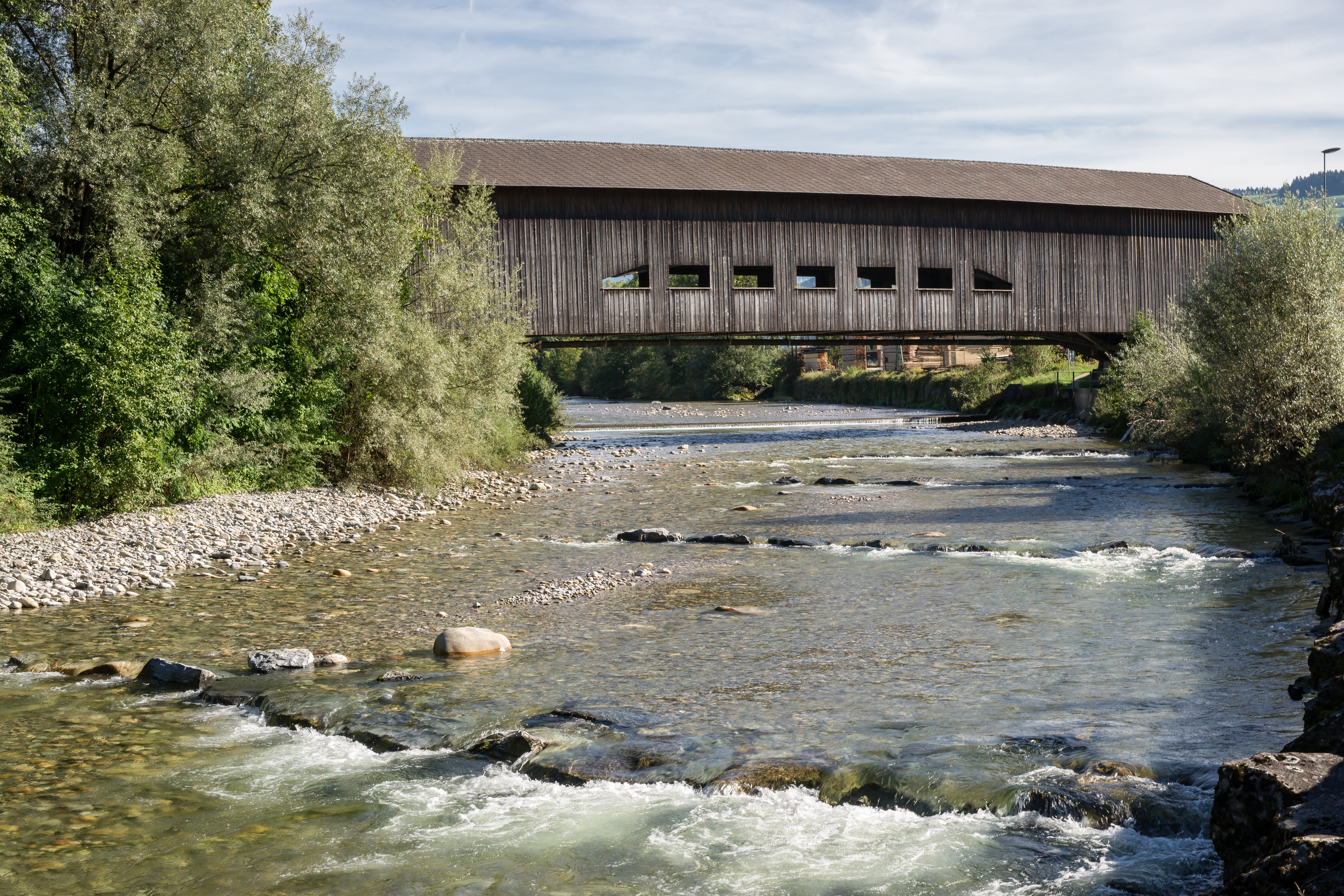
Wooden bridge over the Emme river at Schüpbach

Aerial view (1946)

Signau has an area of 22.13 km^{2} (8.54 sq mi). As of 2012, a total of 12.2 km^{2} (4.7 mi^{2}) or 55.3% is used for agricultural purposes, while 7.91 km^{2} (3.05 mi^{2}) or 35.8% is forested. The rest of the municipality is 1.76 km^{2} (0.68 mi^{2}) or 8.0% is settled (buildings or roads), 0.24 km^{2} (0.093 mi^{2}) or 1.1% is either rivers or lakes and 0.01 km^{2} (2.5 acres) or 0.0% is unproductive land.

During the same year, housing and buildings made up 3.8% and transportation infrastructure made up 2.9%. A total of 34.1% of the total land area is heavily forested and 1.7% is covered with orchards or small clusters of trees. Of the agricultural land, 23.2% is used for growing crops and 30.8% is pasturage, while 1.2% is used for orchards or vine crops. All the water in the municipality is flowing water.

The municipality is located in the upper Emmental near the head waters of the Emme river. It consists of the linear village of Signau, part of the hamlet of Steinen, the Schüpbach settlement and scattered farmhouses in the surrounding mountains at elevations of 700–1,100 meters (2,300–3,600 ft).

On 31 December 2009 Amtsbezirk Signau, the municipality's former district, was dissolved. On the following day, 1 January 2010, it joined the newly created Verwaltungskreis Emmental.

== Coat of arms ==
The blazon of the municipal coat of arms is Pally of six Argent and Azure and overall two Bars Gules.

== Demographics ==
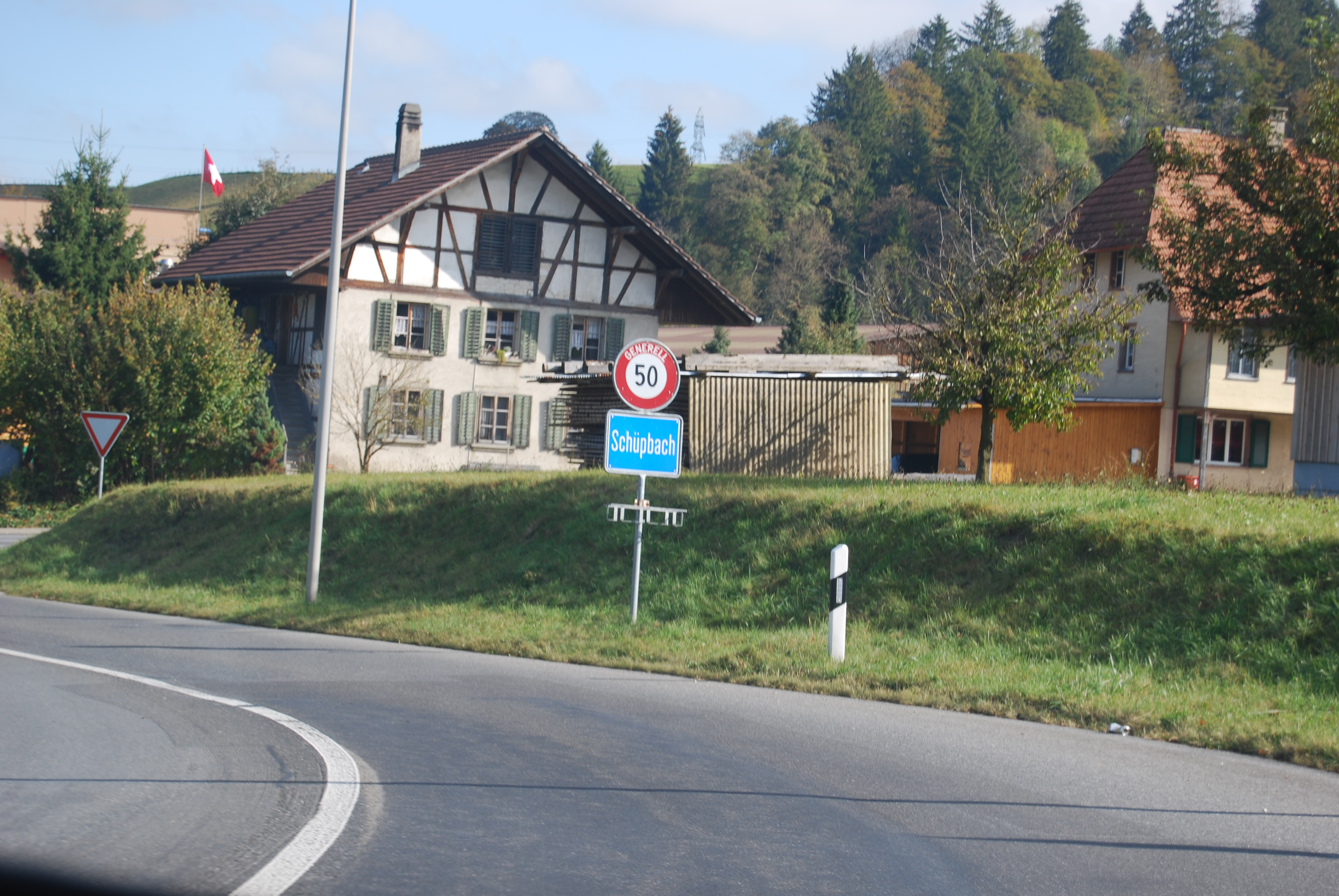
House in Schüpbach

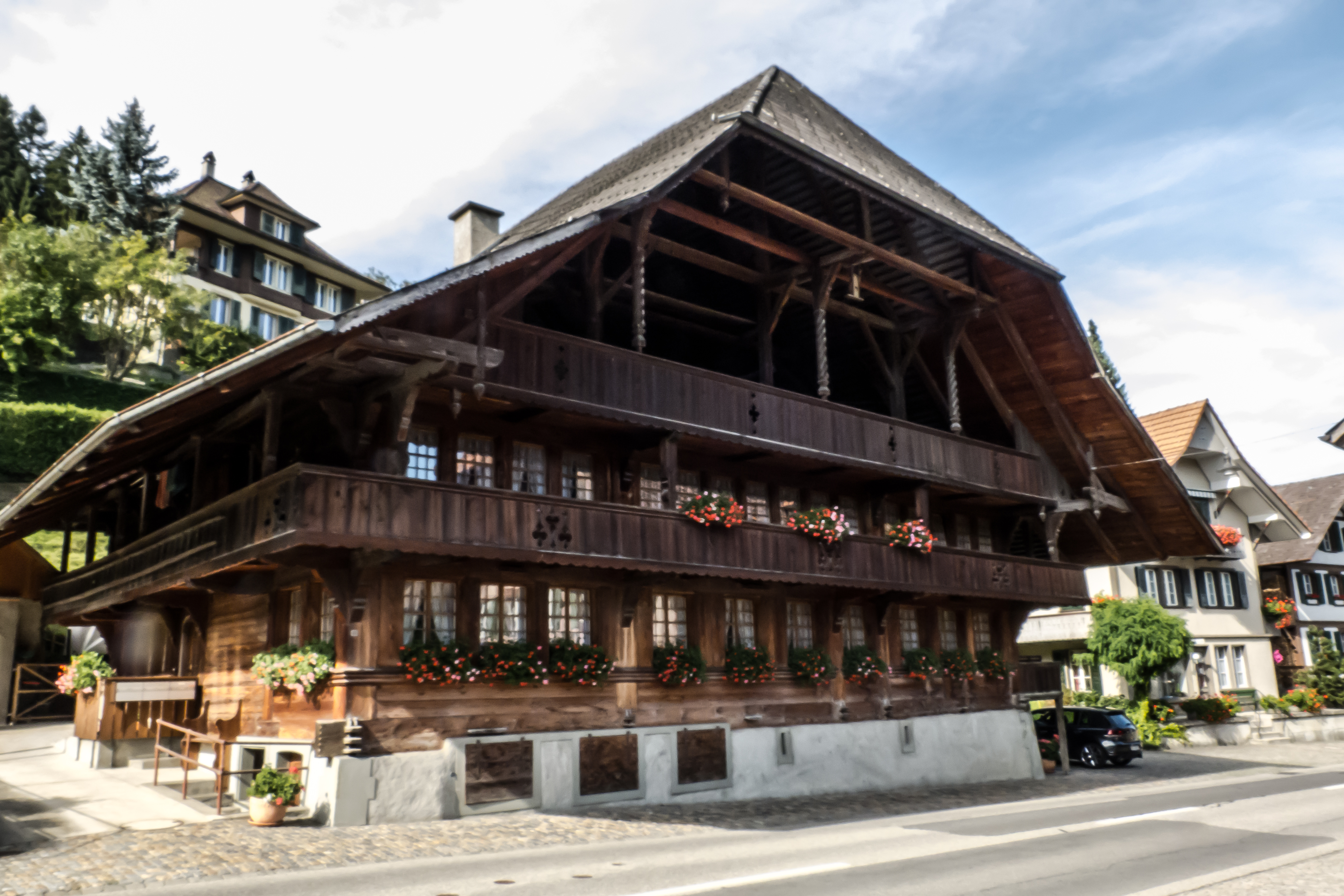
The historic Krämerhaus in Signau

Signau has a population (as of December 2020) of 2,594. As of 2012, 4.7% of the population are resident foreign nationals. Between the last 2 years (2010-2012) the population changed at a rate of -0.1%. Migration accounted for -2.8%, while births and deaths accounted for -0.1%.

Most of the population (as of 2000) speaks German (2,741 or 95.2%) as their first language, Albanian is the second most common (53 or 1.8%) and French is the third (16 or 0.6%). There are 3 people who speak Italian.

As of 2008, the population was 50.6% male and 49.4% female. The population was made up of 1,320 Swiss men (48.0% of the population) and 70 (2.5%) non-Swiss men. There were 1,314 Swiss women (47.8%) and 45 (1.6%) non-Swiss women. Of the population in the municipality, 1,213 or about 42.1% were born in Signau and lived there in 2000. There were 1,151 or 40.0% who were born in the same canton, while 207 or 7.2% were born somewhere else in Switzerland, and 161 or 5.6% were born outside of Switzerland.

As of 2012, children and teenagers (0–19 years old) make up 22.0% of the population, while adults (20–64 years old) make up 59.2% and seniors (over 64 years old) make up 18.9%.

As of 2000, there were 1,272 people who were single and never married in the municipality. There were 1,347 married individuals, 196 widows or widowers and 63 individuals who are divorced.

As of 2010, there were 333 households that consist of only one person and 102 households with five or more people. In 2000, a total of 1,041 apartments (91.5% of the total) were permanently occupied, while 47 apartments (4.1%) were seasonally occupied and 50 apartments (4.4%) were empty. As of 2012, the construction rate of new housing units was 1.1 new units per 1000 residents. The vacancy rate for the municipality, in 2013, was 2.8%. In 2012, single family homes made up 29.0% of the total housing in the municipality.

The historical population is given in the following chart:

== Economy ==
As of 2011, Signau had an unemployment rate of 1.47%. As of 2011, there were a total of 1,042 people employed in the municipality. Of these, there were 325 people employed in the primary economic sector and about 116 businesses involved in this sector. 336 people were employed in the secondary sector and there were 48 businesses in this sector. 381 people were employed in the tertiary sector, with 95 businesses in this sector. There were 1,482 residents of the municipality who were employed in some capacity, of which females made up 41.2% of the workforce.

In 2008 there were a total of 739 full-time equivalent jobs. The number of jobs in the primary sector was 208, all of which were in agriculture. The number of jobs in the secondary sector was 306 of which 209 or (68.3%) were in manufacturing, 6 or (2.0%) were in mining and 89 (29.1%) were in construction. The number of jobs in the tertiary sector was 225. In the tertiary sector; 62 or 27.6% were in wholesale or retail sales or the repair of motor vehicles, 18 or 8.0% were in the movement and storage of goods, 30 or 13.3% were in a hotel or restaurant, 6 or 2.7% were in the information industry, 12 or 5.3% were the insurance or financial industry, 17 or 7.6% were technical professionals or scientists, 38 or 16.9% were in education and 13 or 5.8% were in health care.

In 2000, there were 340 workers who commuted into the municipality and 907 workers who commuted away. The municipality is a net exporter of workers, with about 2.7 workers leaving the municipality for every one entering. A total of 575 workers (62.8% of the 915 total workers in the municipality) both lived and worked in Signau. Of the working population, 14.8% used public transportation to get to work, and 50.5% used a private car.

The local and cantonal tax rate in Signau is one of the lowest in the canton. In 2012 the average local and cantonal tax rate on a married resident, with two children, of Signau making 150,000 CHF was 12.3%, while an unmarried resident's rate was 18.5%. For comparison, the average rate for the entire canton in 2011, was 14.2% and 22.0%, while the nationwide average was 12.3% and 21.1% respectively.

In 2010 there were a total of 1,161 taxpayers in the municipality. Of that total, 268 made over 75,000 CHF per year. There were 12 people who made between 15,000 and 20,000 per year. The greatest number of workers, 332, made between 50,000 and 75,000 CHF per year. The average income of the over 75,000 CHF group in Signau was 103,562 CHF, while the average across all of Switzerland was 131,244 CHF.

In 2011 a total of 1.5% of the population received direct financial assistance from the government.

== Sights ==
The entire village of Signau is designated as part of the Inventory of Swiss Heritage Sites.

== Politics ==
In the 2011 federal election the most popular party was the Swiss People's Party (SVP) which received 44.7% of the vote. The next three most popular parties were the Conservative Democratic Party (BDP) (18.2%), the Social Democratic Party (SP) (11.2%) and the Evangelical People's Party (EVP) (6.1%). In the federal election, a total of 1,048 votes were cast, and the voter turnout was 48.3%.

== Religion ==
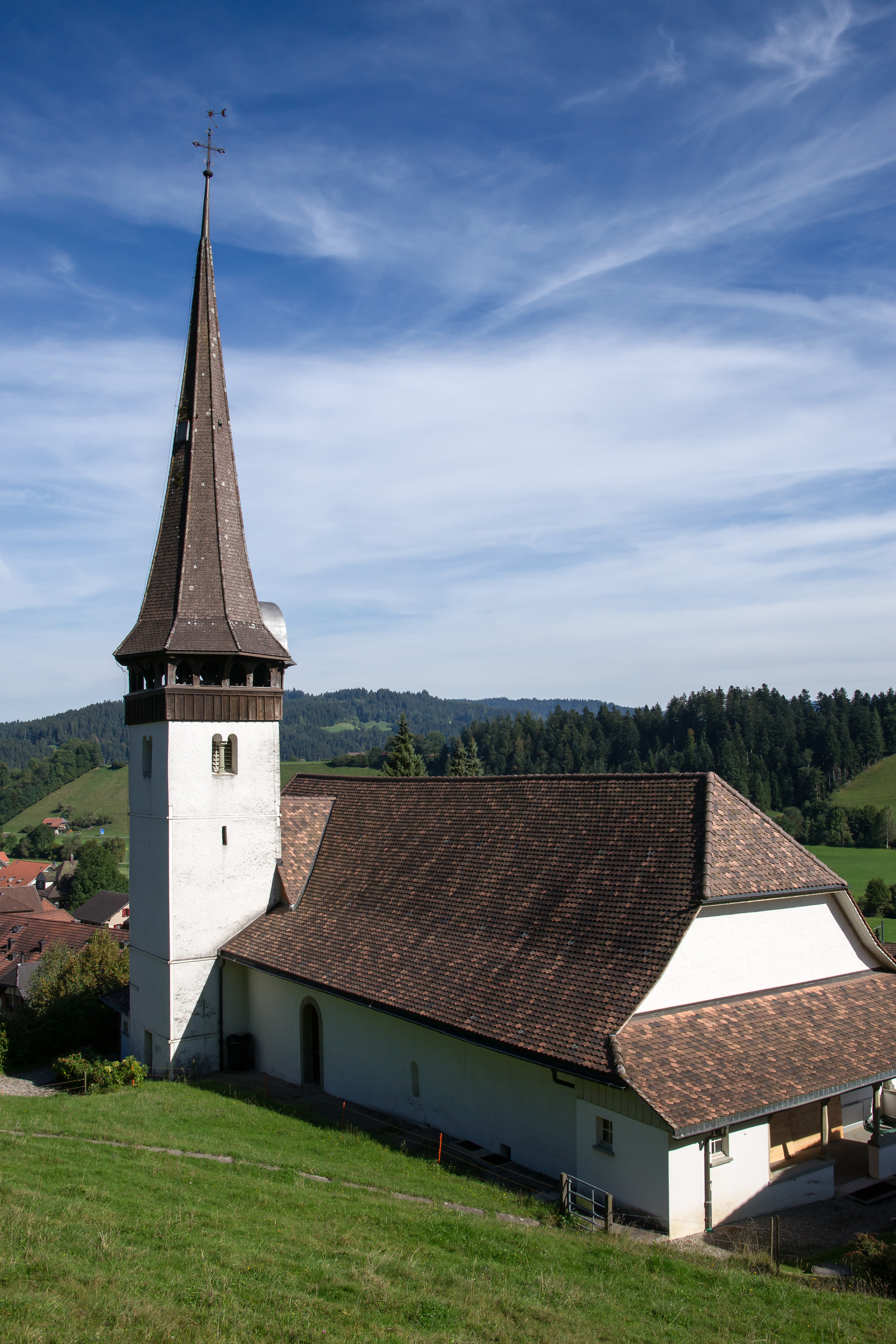
Signau village church

From the 2000 census, 2,226 or 77.3% belonged to the Swiss Reformed Church, while 110 or 3.8% were Roman Catholic. Of the rest of the population, there were 21 members of an Orthodox church (or about 0.73% of the population), and there were 206 individuals (or about 7.16% of the population) who belonged to another Christian church. There were 85 (or about 2.95% of the population) who were Muslim. There was 1 person who was Buddhist, 11 individuals who were Hindu and 7 individuals who belonged to another church. 90 (or about 3.13% of the population) belonged to no church, are agnostic or atheist, and 121 individuals (or about 4.20% of the population) did not answer the question.

== Education ==
In Signau about 56.7% of the population have completed non-mandatory upper secondary education, and 13.8% have completed additional higher education (either university or a Fachhochschule). Of the 231 who had completed some form of tertiary schooling listed in the census, 72.7% were Swiss men, 22.1% were Swiss women, 3.9% were non-Swiss men.

The Canton of Bern school system provides one year of non-obligatory Kindergarten, followed by six years of Primary school. This is followed by three years of obligatory lower Secondary school where the students are separated according to ability and aptitude. Following the lower Secondary students may attend additional schooling or they may enter an apprenticeship.

During the 2012-13 school year, there were a total of 393 students attending classes in Signau. There were a total of 59 students in the German language kindergarten classes in the municipality. Of the kindergarten students, 6.8% were permanent or temporary residents of Switzerland (not citizens) and 8.5% have a different mother language than the classroom language. The municipality's primary school had 160 students in German language classes. Of the primary students, 6.3% were permanent or temporary residents of Switzerland (not citizens) and 10.6% have a different mother language than the classroom language. During the same year, the lower secondary school had a total of 174 students. There were 0.6% who were permanent or temporary residents of Switzerland (not citizens) and 4.0% have a different mother language than the classroom language.

As of 2000, there were a total of 398 students attending any school in the municipality. Of those, 300 both lived and attended school in the municipality, while 98 students came from another municipality. During the same year, 103 residents attended schools outside the municipality.

Signau is home to the Bibliothek Signau library. The library has (as of 2008) 10,068 books or other media, and loaned out 26,221 items in the same year. It was open a total of 165 days with average of 9 hours per week during that year.
