= Neu-Signau Castle =

Castle in Bowil in Bern, Switzerland

Neu-Signau
- Burg Neu-Signau
- Bowil

Site information
- Type: hill castle, spur castle
- Code: CH-BE
- Condition: burgstall (no above-ground ruins)

Location
- Location within Switzerland
- Coordinates: 46°54′34″N 7°42′34″E

Site history
- Built: 14th Century

Garrison information
- Occupants: Freiherren von Signau

Neu-Signau Castle (German: Burg Neu-Signau) is a ruined castle in the municipality of Bowil in the canton of Bern in Switzerland.

== History ==
The castle was built to replace Alt-Signau Castle as the residence of the Barons of Signau. It was intended to protect and control the road between the Emmental and Aare river valley. In 1826 the castle was demolished.

== Location and description ==
The castle is situated on a conglomerate spur above Bowil village. On an opposite hill, across the valley are the ruins of Alt-Signau Castle. Today, only a few traces of the castle can be seen.

== See also ==
- List of castles in Switzerland
