= Erlach =

Erlach may refer to:

== Places ==
=== Austria ===
- Erlach (Kallham), a locality of Kallham
- Erlach (Pischelsdorf), a locality of Pischelsdorf am Engelbach
- Bad Erlach, also known as Erlach an der Pitten in Wiener Neustadt-Land, Lower Austria

=== Germany ===
- Erlach, a borough of Renchen, Baden-Württemberg
- Erlach am Inn, a borough of Simbach am Inn, Bavaria
- Erlach am Main, a borough of Neustadt am Main, Bavaria
- Erlach (Hirschaid), a small village in Bavaria

=== Switzerland ===
- Erlach, Switzerland, in the canton of Bern
  - Erlach Castle, a castle in the municipality of Erlach
  - Erlach (district), a district in the canton of Bern
- Erlach Abbey, a Benedictine monastery in Gals, Canton of Bern

== People with the surname ==
- von Erlach family, a noble Bernese patrician family
- Burkhard von Erlach (1566–1640), German lawyer and Hofmarschall of Christian II, Prince of Anhalt-Bernburg
- Franz Ludwig von Erlach (1575–1651), of the von Erlach family
- Hieronymus von Erlach (1667–1748), of the von Erlach family
- Johann Bernhard Fischer von Erlach (1656–1723), Austrian architect, sculptor, and architectural historian
- Joseph Emanuel Fischer von Erlach (1693–1742), Austrian architect of the Baroque, Rococo and Baroque classicism
- Monika Erlach, Austrian pole vault champion
- Romi Erlach, Estonian host of the 1999 and 2003 Eurovision Song Contest pre-selections
- Rudolf von Erlach (1299–1360), Swiss knight and military commander
- Rudolf von Erlach (1448-1507), built a castle in Bümpliz-Oberbottigen, Bern, Switzerland
- Sigmund von Erlach (1614–1699), Swiss military commander and politician of Bern
