= Joseph Simon Volmar =

Swiss painter and sculptor (1796–1865)

- Born: 26 October 1796; Bern, Switzerland
- Died: 6 October 1865 (aged 68); Bern, Switzerland
- Known for: Painting, sculpture, lithography

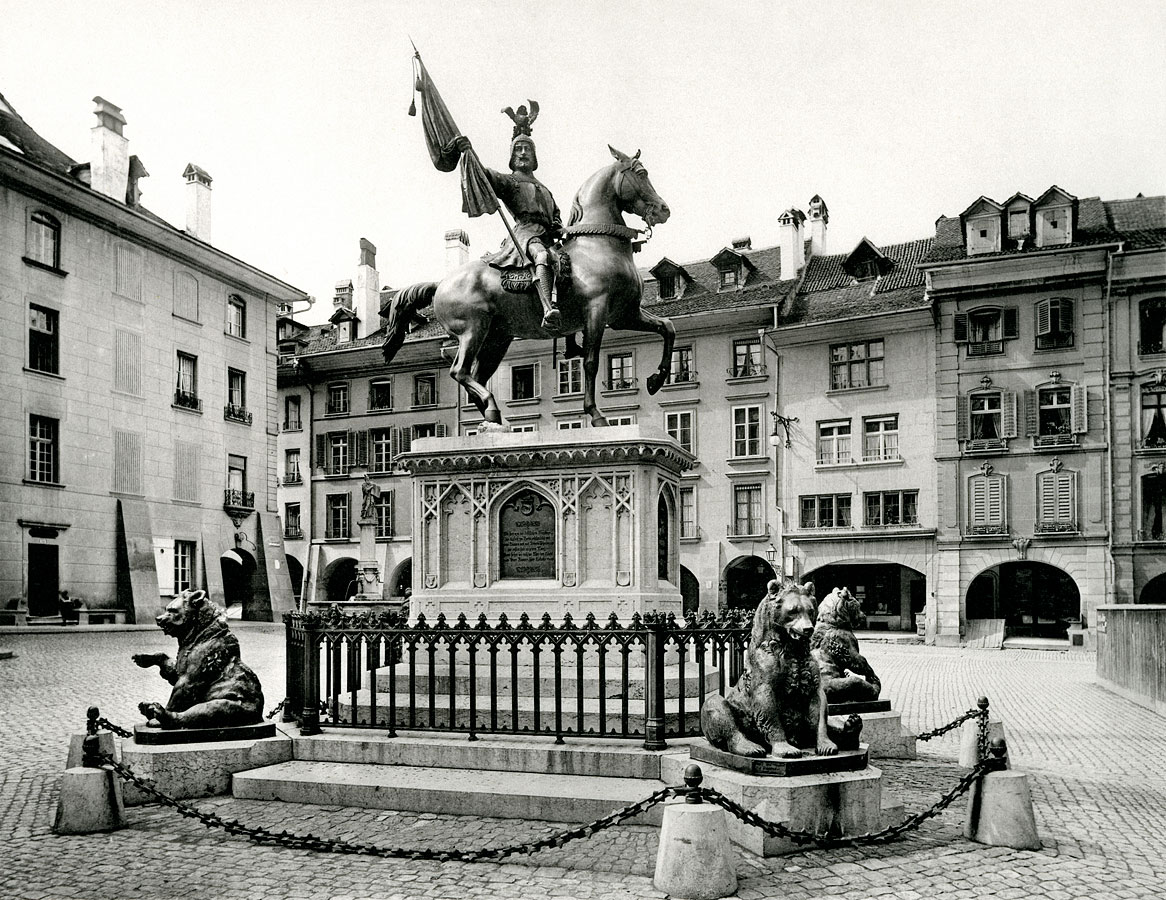
Erlach Monument, Münsterplatz, Bern, 1895

Joseph Simon Volmar (26 October 1796 – 6 October 1865) was a Swiss painter, sculptor and lithographer. He was known for animal painting, especially horse subjects. His public monuments include the Rudolf von Erlach monument in Bern.

== Biography ==
Joseph Simon Volmar was born on 26 October 1796 in Bern. He was the son of Johann Georg Volmar, a history and landscape painter who had emigrated from Württemberg.

Volmar was introduced to art by his father at the Bern art school. Between 1814 and 1823, Volmar continued his studies in Paris. During his time there, he studied with Horace Vernet and Carle Vernet, and later came into contact with Théodore Géricault. In 1824, he returned to Paris for training in sculpture under David d'Angers.

In 1823, Volmar married Margaretha Schmid. He settled again in Bern in 1832 and became extraordinary professor of academic drawing and oil painting in 1836. He died in Bern on 6 October 1865.

== Work ==
Volmar worked as a painter, sculptor and lithographer. Before his Paris training, he had already attracted attention in Bern for his horse paintings. In 1822, he contributed six lithographs to Grands Chevaux, a series based on watercolours by Théodore Géricault.

Volmar was particularly known for animal painting, especially horse subjects. With Andreas-Friedrich Gerber, he co-edited Anatomischer Atlas des Pferdes, published between 1832 and 1834. After returning to Bern, he also painted historical scenes and landscapes. His works are held by Kunstmuseum Bern and the Swiss National Museum in Zürich.

== Public monuments ==
Volmar designed the equestrian statue of Rudolf von Erlach in Bern, which was erected on Münsterplatz in 1849 and moved to the Grabenpromenade in July 1969. In 1860, he created the Père Grégoire Girard monument in Fribourg.
