= Reichenbach Castle =

Castle in Zollikofen in Bern, Switzerland

Coordinates: 46°59′26″N 7°26′57″E

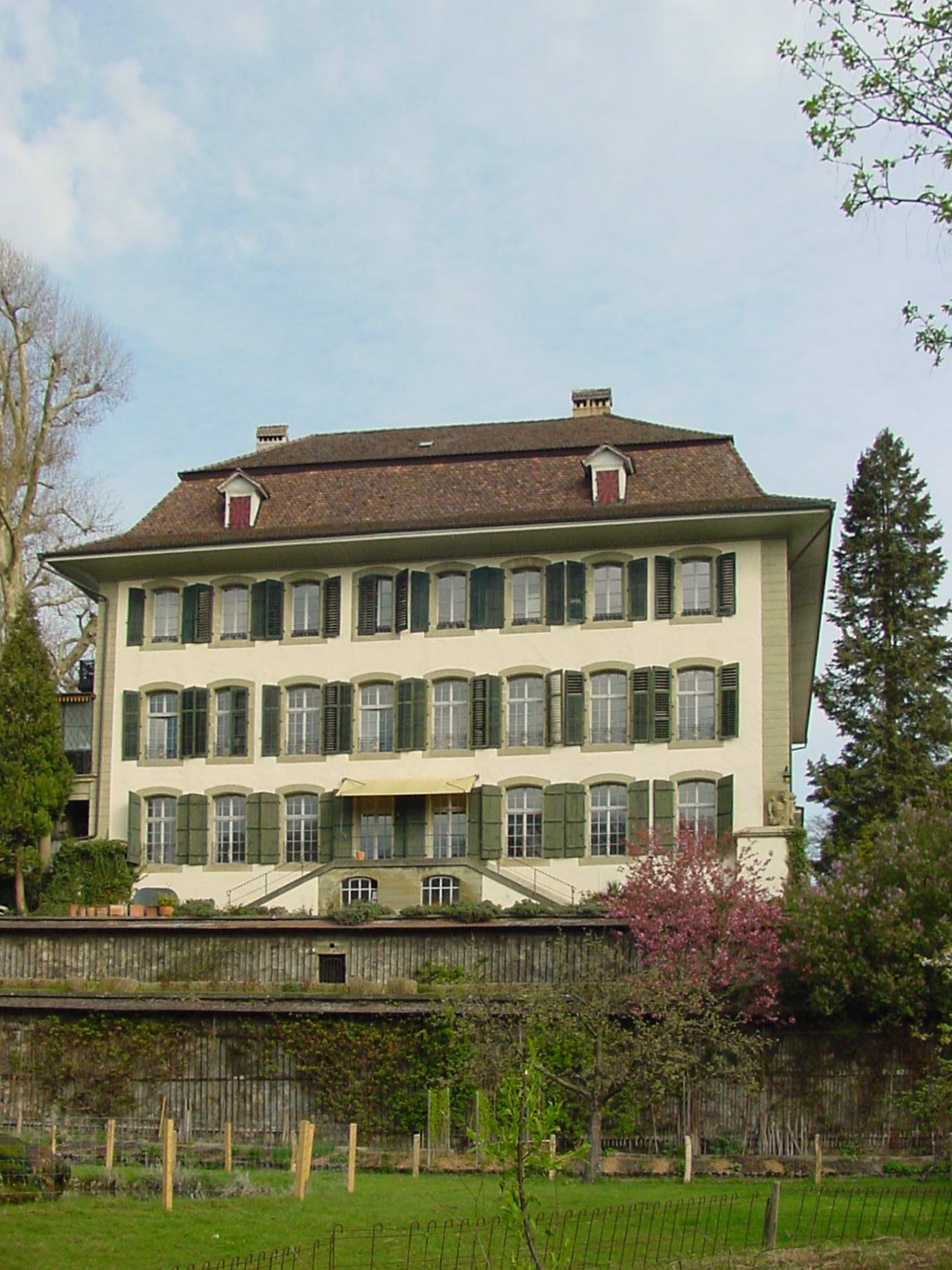
Schloss Reichenbach

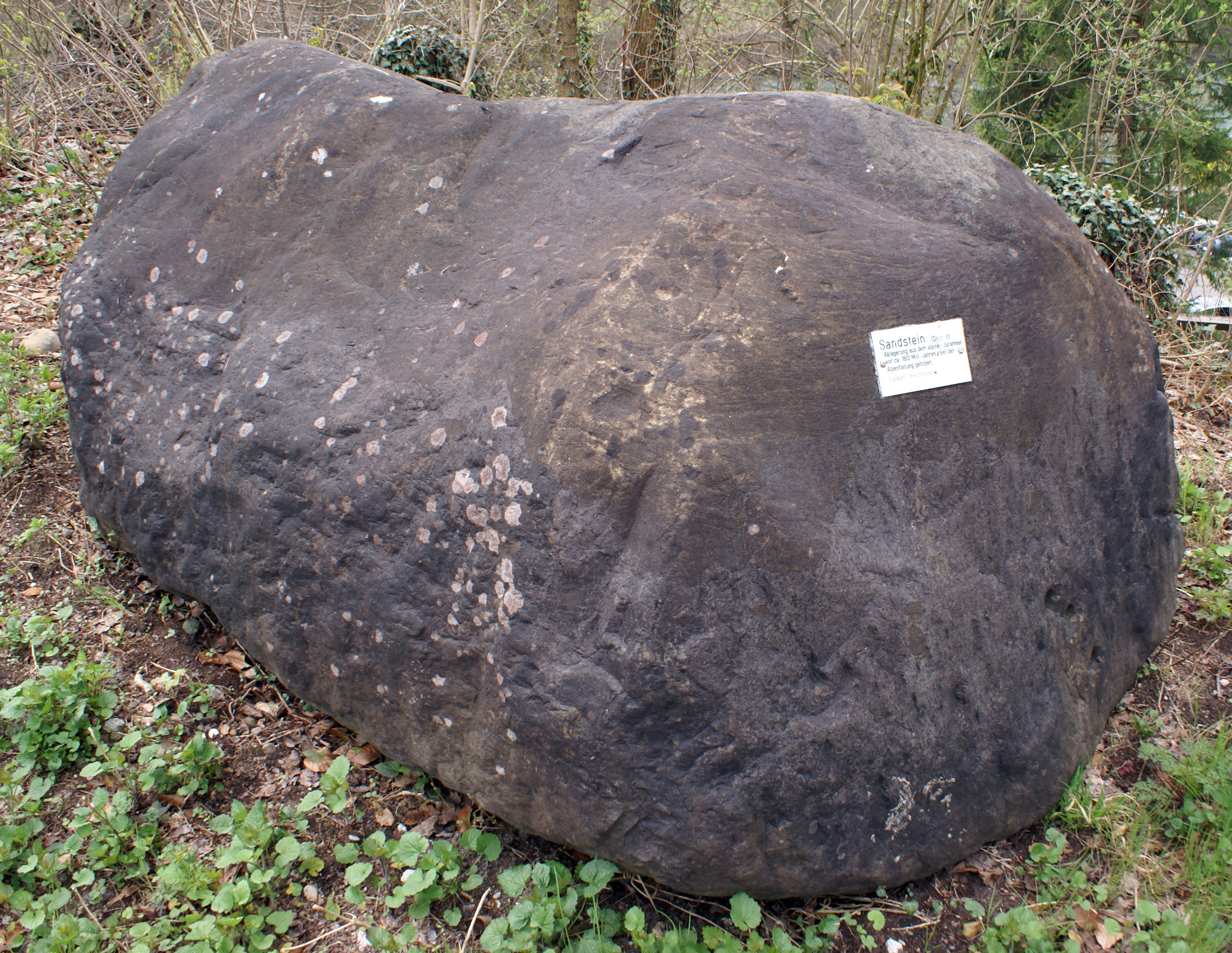
One of the boulders transported to the area of Reichenbach castle by glacial action during the last ice age

Reichenbach castle (Schloss Reichenbach) is located in Zollikofen, about 5 kilometres north of Bern. The castle was founded as a medieval fort, probably built on the site of an earlier Roman fort, on the river Aar. The medieval castle was later rebuilt in the Baroque style. It is a Swiss heritage site of national significance.

== Geology of the area ==
About 14,000 years ago, the ice age came to the end. During the ice age the area was covered with up to 350 meters (1,150 ft) thick ice packs. The relatively soft sandstone and limestone rock formations north of Bern were eroded by the Aar river. Over thousands of years the Aar carved loops in the terrain, and changed direction. In the area below the castle, the river changed direction by 180 degrees. This produced a slightly elevated place which provided a good observation point up and down the river.

== Archaeology of the area ==
Scattered archaeological findings suggest that the area of the Zollikofen and the nearby Enge peninsula have been inhabited since the Bronze Age (about 1300 BC). The Aar river formed a natural barricade protecting the area. This natural fortification was used by the Celts, and later the Romans. On the peninsula protected by the Aar a large Celtic settlement grew up. This was replaced or expanded by the Romans when they conquered the region. The site of Reichenbach castle was, probably, originally a Roman river fortress or castra. It is not entirely clear how the castra was connected to the peninsula although a Roman era paved road has been found. This road led to a bridge over the Aar. By the time of the Alamanni, in the middle of the 5th century, very little of the fortress remained. The Roman soldiers had departed and the new occupants built mostly in wood. However, the name Zollikofen is most likely of Alemannic origin (Cholinchove).

== History of the castle ==
While a Roman fort existed, it is unclear if during the time of the Alamanni it was maintained or allowed to decay. During its long history, the castle changed ownership many times. The first documentation of the castle is at the beginning of 14th century when it was purchased by Rudolf von Erlach, the victor of the Battle of Laupen, who was to rule from Reichenbach castle over the surrounding area. The castle remained in the von Erlach family until 1530. It was acquired by Beat Fischer (later von Reichenbach), founder of Fischerpost, in 1683. He redecorated the castle, and built the nearby brewery. The Reichenbach family's rule continued until 1830.

== Notable owners ==
=== Rudolf von Erlach ===
Rudolf von Erlach was born about 1285 and died about 1360.

Historians are still debating whether Rudolf von Erlach was the person who led the Bernese on the Battle of Laupen. Nevertheless, he is legendary, known by everybody in Bern. His name became synonymous with bravery and loyalty.

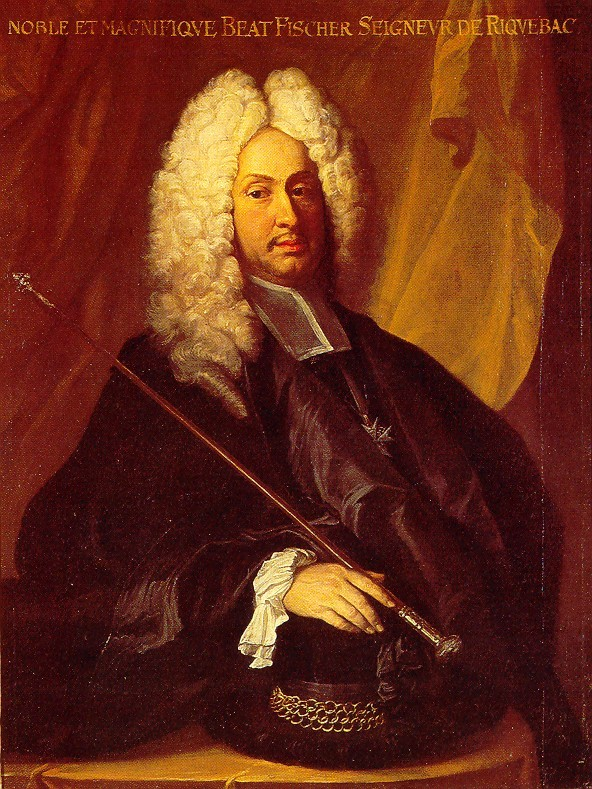
Beat Fischer von Reichenbach

Little is known of von Erlach's life; he probably took part in Henry VII's campaign in Italy. In April 1340 after the success in the Battle of Laupen, in which 6,000 Bernese were able to overcome the superior forces of Freiburg, Rudolf von Erlach was hailed the leader of the Bernese in a campaign against Freiburg. According to the legend, Rudolf von Erlach was killed by his son Jost von Ruden in 1360.

=== Beat Fischer von Reichenbach ===
Fischer von Reichenbach was born, on May 23, 1641, in Bern. He died on March 23, 1698, in Bern. In 1675 he founded and kept a monopolising control of the first post service in Bern. The service was named for him "Fischerpost". The service operated until 1832. Beat Fischer von Reichenbach was knighted by Leopold I, Holy Roman Emperor for establishing postal services between Germany and Spain.

In 1975 a postage stamp dedicated to Beat Fischer von Reichenbach was issued in Switzerland.

== The castle and the garden ==
The castle was first documented at the beginning of the 14th century, when Rudolf von Erlach founded his dynasty's rule.Historical paintings and plans provide an opportunity for studying the changes in the design of the castle and it surroundings during more than a hundred years of its existence. The south east view, painted in 1669 by Albrecht Kauw, indicates that a small garden was present at the time. There were also some agricultural fields outside the walls.

The castle remained in the possession of von Erlach family until 1530. There were few owners before it was acquired by Beat Fischer von Reichenbach. It was at this time that the castle underwent extensive reconstruction. In 1685, it was transformed to its current appearance and the French style gardens were built and the terraces extending down to the river were constructed.

Some outbuildings were built, such as the brewery, which was added to provide for the Bavarian post office workers, who worked for Fischerpost.

In 1743, two more fountains were added, but these were later removed. A restaurant was built on the river side.

A naturalist, who visited the castle in the 19th century described the garden:

Close to this residence is the present home of Dr. Tappeiner, who bought and renovated Schloss Reichenbach, whose enormous growth of ivy attracts much attention. On entering the garden one finds a small forest of semi-tropical trees enchanting to behold; clambering vines encircle the trunks and depend from the graceful branches—for a moment one seems to be in the heart of the tropics.

In 1983-84 the castle's facade was renovated.

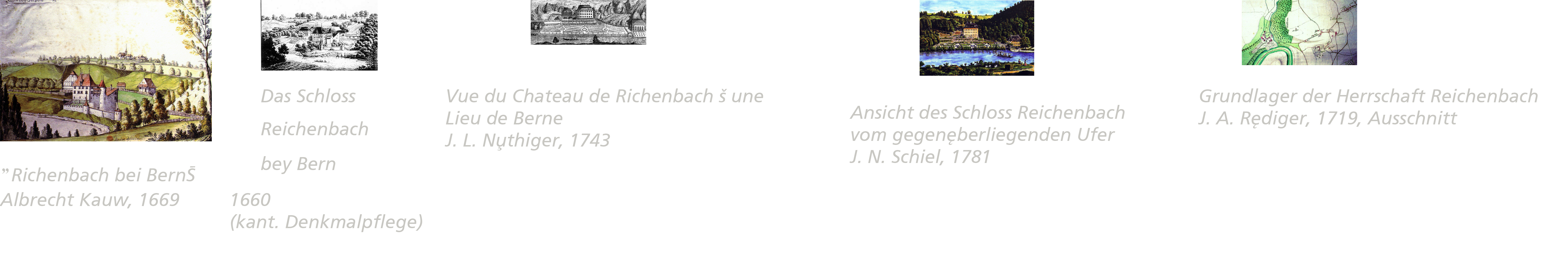
Historical paintings and plan of Castle Reichenbac

== See also ==
- List of castles in Switzerland
