= Geiger HDP 13.5 =

German aircraft electric motor

HDP 13.5
- Type: Electric aircraft engine
- National origin: Germany
- Manufacturer: Geiger Engineering

The Geiger HDP 13.5 is a German electric motor for powering electric aircraft, designed and produced by Geiger Engineering of Seigendorf, Hirschaid, Oberfranken.

== Design and development ==
The HDP 13.5 is a brushless 58 volt design producing 13.5 kW (18 hp), with an outrunner coil. It has a 93% efficiency. The low working rpm of the engine means that it can turn a propeller at efficient speeds without the need for a reduction drive.

== Specifications (HDP 13.5) ==
Data from Tacke

=== General characteristics ===
- Type: Brushless electric aircraft engine
- Length: 181 mm (7.1 in)
- Diameter: 215 mm (8.5 in)
- Dry weight: 4.70 kg (10.4 lb)

=== Components ===
- Coil type: outrunner
- Cooling system: air
- Reduction gear: none

=== Performance ===
- Power output: 13.5 kW (18 hp)
- Voltage: 58V nominal
- Power-to-weight ratio: 2.9 kW/kg

== See also ==
Related development

- Geiger HDP 10

Related lists

- List of aircraft engines
