= Geiger Engineering =

German electric aircraft engine manufacturer

Geiger Engineering GmbH
- Company type: Gesellschaft mit beschränkter Haftung
- Industry: Aerospace
- Headquarters: Seigendorf, Hirschaid, Oberfranken, Germany
- Products: Electric aircraft engines
- Website: www.geigerengineering.de

Geiger Engineering GmbH is a German aircraft engine manufacturer based in Seigendorf, Hirschaid, Oberfranken. The company specializes in the design and manufacture of electric aircraft engines and related systems, including batteries, electric controllers and aircraft propellers.

The company is a Gesellschaft mit beschränkter Haftung, a form of limited liability company.

== Products ==
Geiger's electric aircraft engines run from 12 to 60 kW (16 to 80 hp). The HDP 10 is typical, a brushless 58 volt design producing 12.5 kW (17 hp) at 1950 rpm, with an outrunner coil at 93% efficiency. The company also produces inverters, aircraft motor instrumentation, system diagnostic, recording and monitoring equipment, electric paramotor system management controllers, battery accumulators as well as line and solar chargers.

Propeller designs include two and three bladed fixed pitch and ground adjustable propellers, folding and in-flight adjustable propellers.

== Aircraft engines ==
Summary of aircraft engines built by Geiger Engineering:

- Geiger HDP 10
- Geiger HDP 12
- Geiger HDP 13.5
- Geiger HDP 16
- Geiger HDP 25
- Geiger HDP 32
- Geiger HDP 50

== See also ==
- List of aircraft propeller manufacturers
