= Köniz Castle =

- Komturei und Schloss Köniz (German)
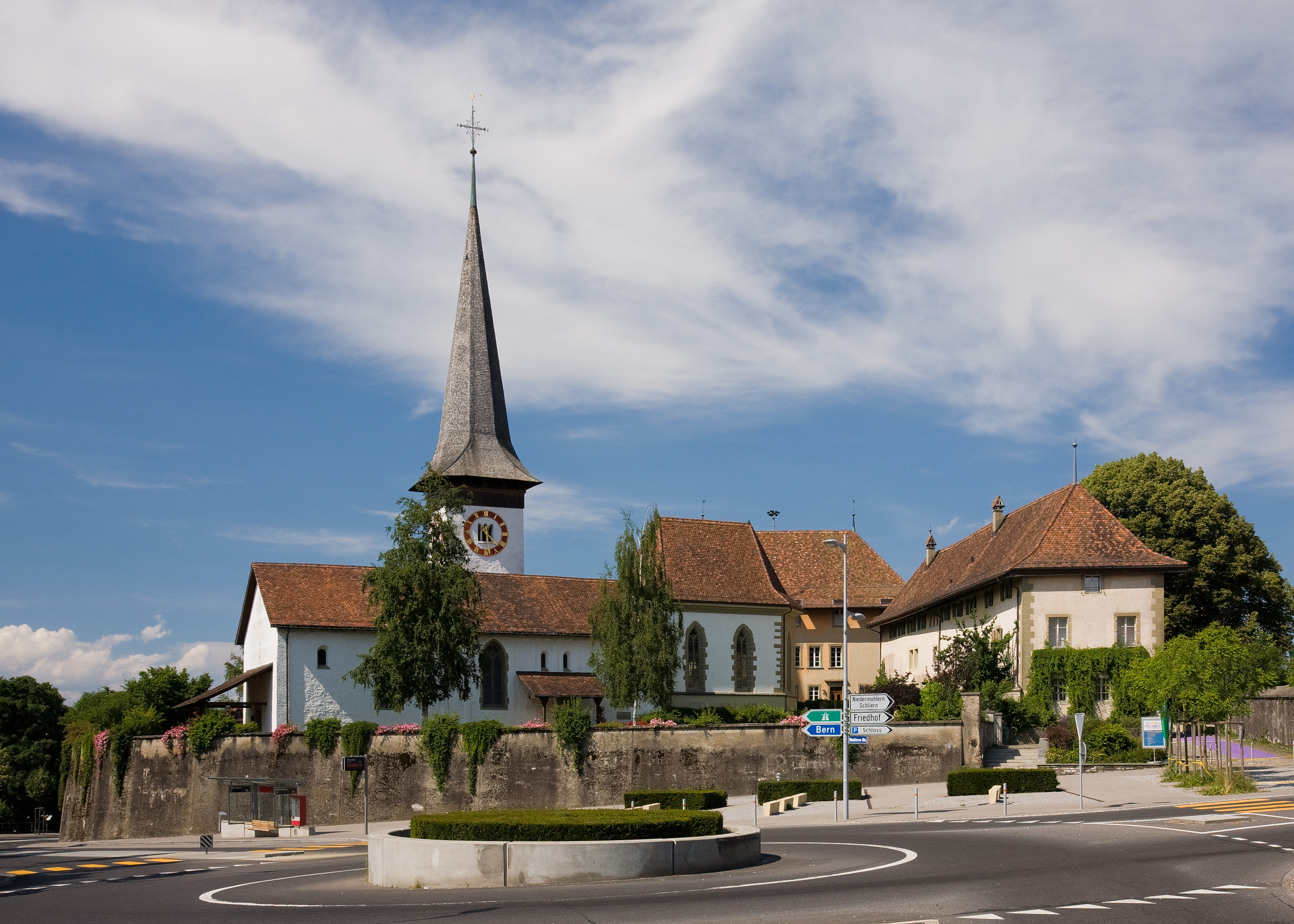
- Köniz Castle

- Location within Switzerland
- 46°55′15″N 7°24′50″E
- Location: Köniz, Canton of Bern, Switzerland

History
- Built: 11th century
- Built for: Augustinian Canons

Site notes
- Restored: 1785-87

Swiss Cultural Property of National Significance
- Type: multiple objects

Köniz Castle (German: Schloss Köniz) is a castle in the municipality of Köniz of the Canton of Bern in Switzerland. It is a Swiss heritage site of national significance.

== History ==
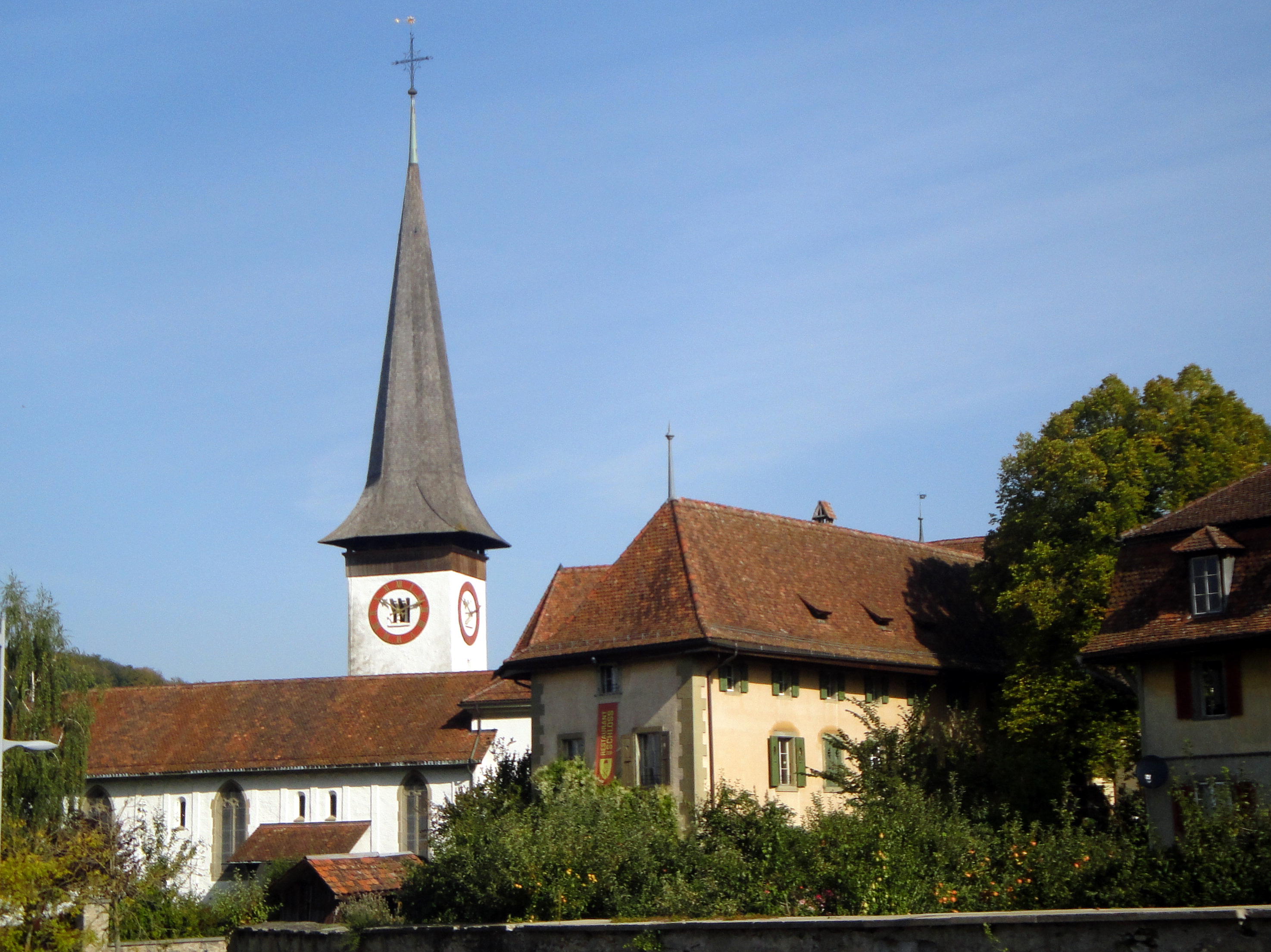
Commandery Church and Castle buildings

The castle was originally built as a monastery and church for the college of Augustinian Canons. According to tradition, the church was established by the Burgundian monarchs Rudolph II and Bertha, which places the founding year between 922 and his death in 937. Archeological excavations have found evidence of an early medieval church below the current structure. The oldest parts of the current building date from the 11th century and the college of Canons is first mentioned in 1208. The Canons at Köniz were quite powerful and controlled extensive holdings. They had direct authority over five large parishes between the Aare and Sense rivers. The head of the Canons was also the dean over 29 additional parishes in the Diocese of Lausanne.

In 1226 King Henry and Emperor Frederick II gave Köniz to the Teutonic Knights as a Commandery. However, many local nobles and religious leaders objected to this sudden transfer. For almost twenty years the ownership of the monastery and its extensive landholdings and rights were tied up in courts. Finally in 1243 a bishop's court ruled in favor of the Knights. The population of Bern boycotted services in Köniz for another ten years, until 1253. During the 13th and 14th centuries the Commandery gained authority over the parish in Bern itself as well as other nearby parishes. The Commandery never had very many knights or lay brothers in residence, but most of the knights came from noble families in Switzerland.

In 1388 Bern acquired control over the county of Aarburgund, which included Köniz. This gave the Commandery religious control over Bern, while Bern had secular control over Köniz and the Commandery. For the next century, Bern struggled to regain religious authority over itself. The first step was beginning construction of the Bern Minster in 1421. In 1485 they established the college of Canons of St. Vincent and separated from the Commandery.

In 1528, Bern adopted the new faith of the Protestant Reformation and attempted to secularize the religious houses throughout the Canton. The Knights of the Commandery fled Köniz and refused the give up the rights to the building and their estates. In the following year, Bern annexed the Commandery buildings. However, in 1542, the powerful Teutonic Order forced Bern to return the buildings in Köniz. They offered to sell it back to Bern in 1552, but the city judged it too expensive. The Knights continued to collect rents from their lands, but lost their military and judicial authority.

In 1610 the main building was rebuilt and renovated. A west wing was added to the building in 1664. A granary was added in 1724. In 1729, the Canton of Bern decided to buy the buildings from the Knights and converted it into a district administration building. The Canton completely renovated it in 1785-87. Following the 1798 French invasion and the creation of the Helvetic Republic the district was dissolved and the building was used by several different institutions. It was an educational institution for boys from 1836–75, then for girls from 1875-89. In 1825 the west wing became the parsonage for the former monastery church. In 1890 it became an institution for the blind, which operated until 1919. From 1925 until 1994 it was a girls' home and school.

In 1994 it was sold to the community and part of it was converted into an artist's space, art gallery and meeting center, known as the Kulturhof. In December 2011 the municipality voted to create the Schlosszone Köniz, a mixed use zone that includes the church, castle buildings, cemetery and green spaces. The Schlosszone will allow both businesses to develop in the area and help fund the restoration and maintenance of the historic buildings. Today the Swiss Reformed parish of Köniz uses the Commandery church as a parish church. The castle buildings house a restaurant, a music school, the Bern School Museum and the Kulturhof.

=== The commandery church ===
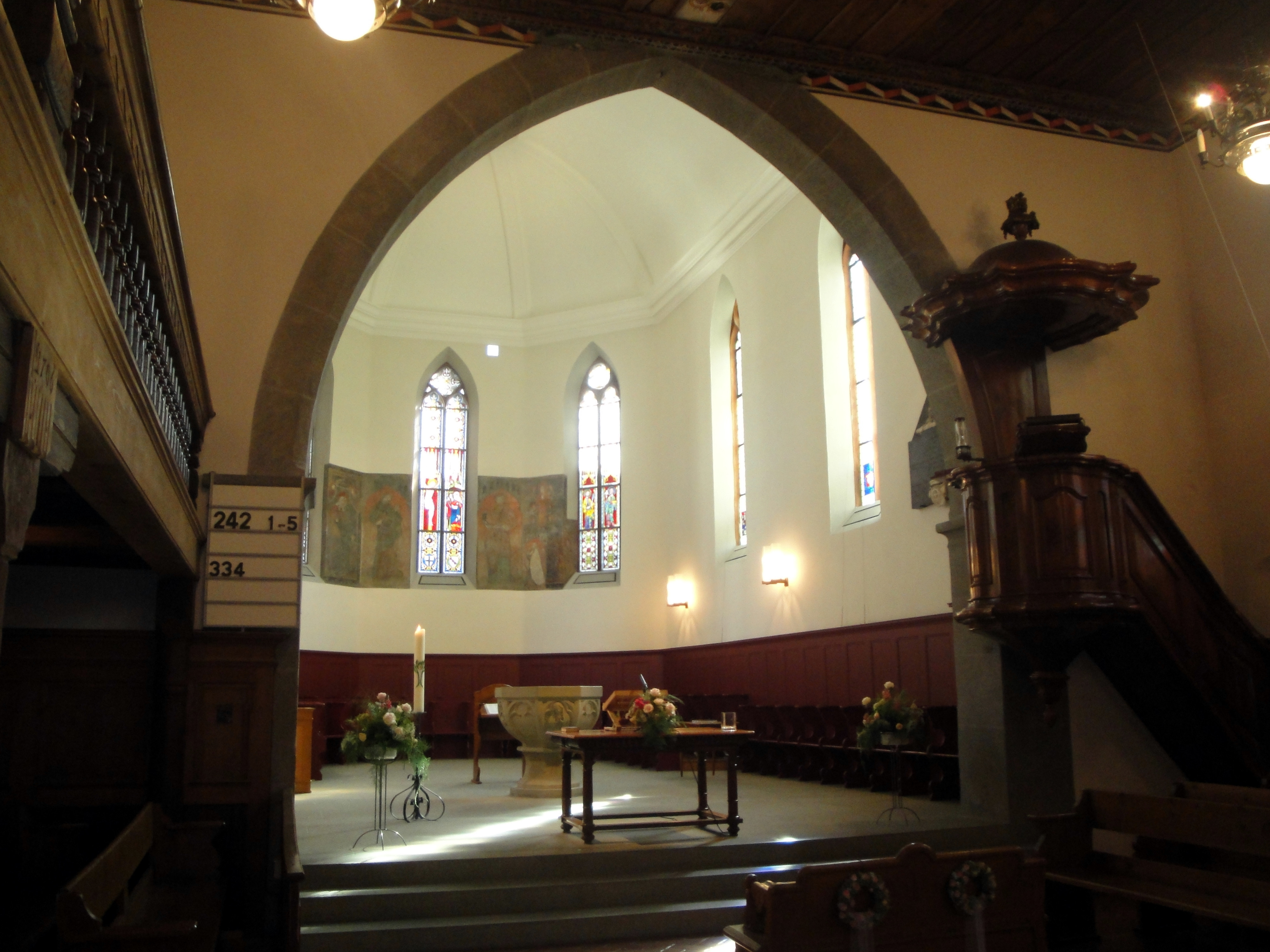
Choir and interior of the Commandery Church

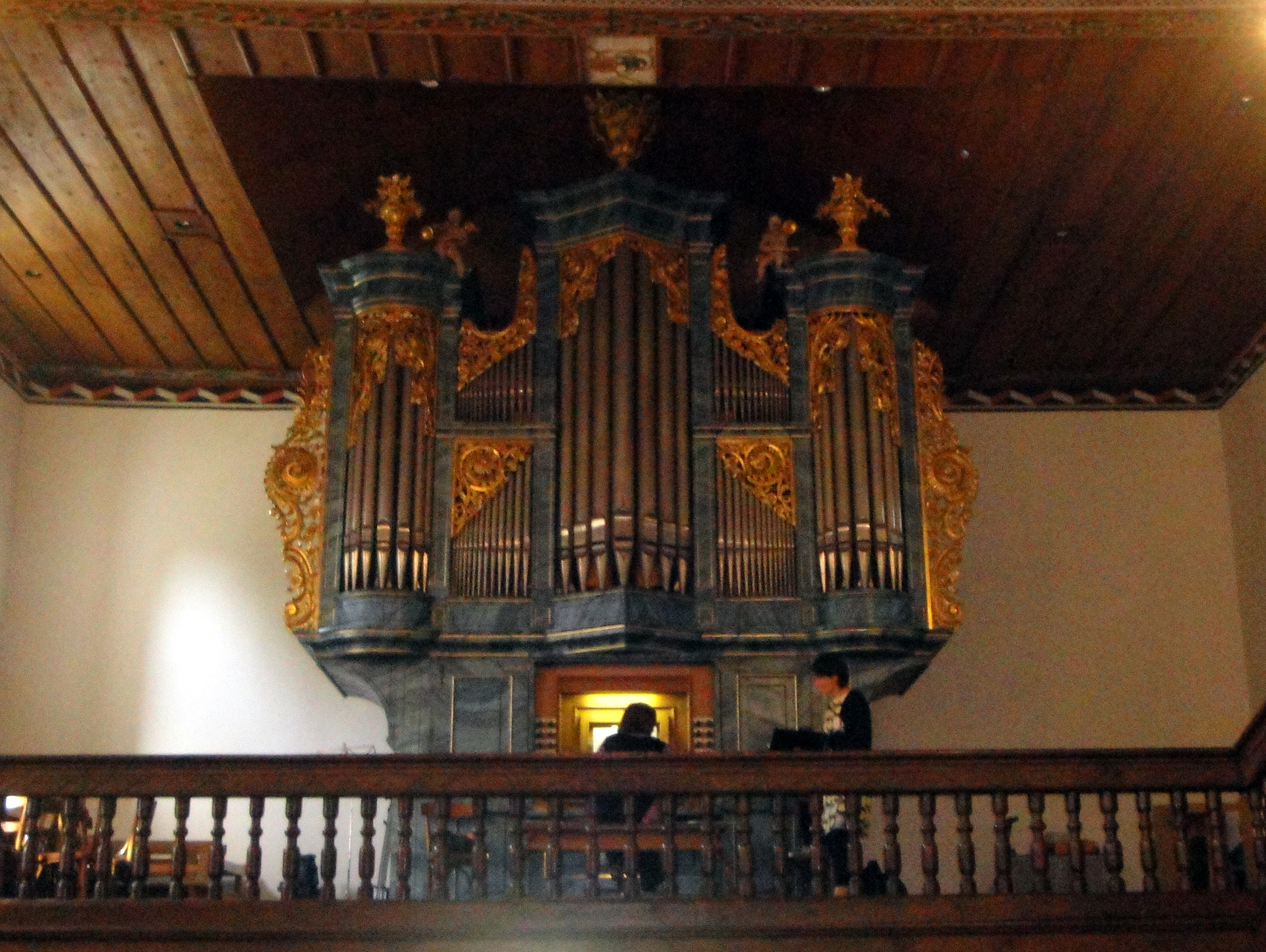
Organ of the Commandery Church

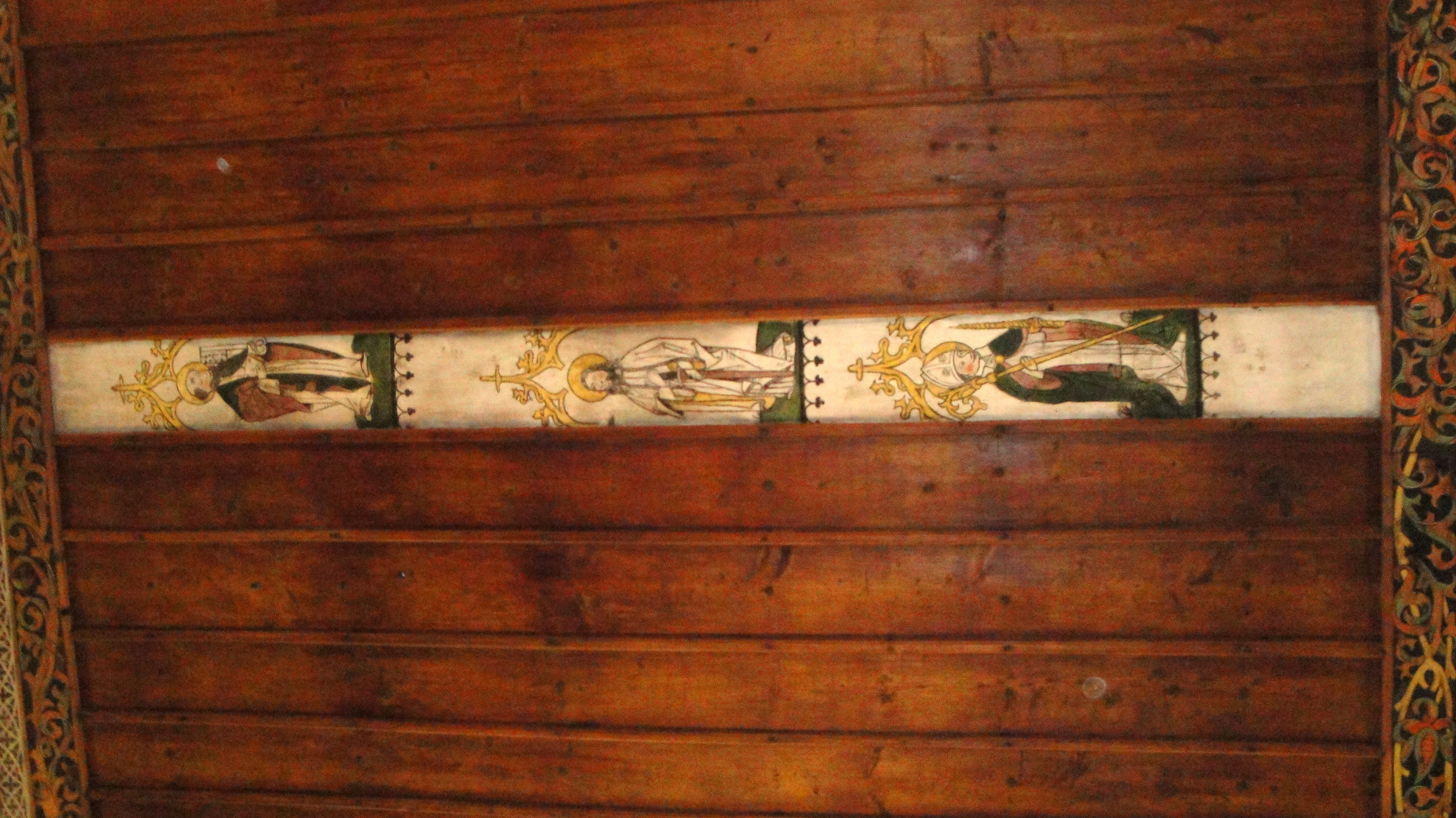
3 Saints from the ceiling of the Church

Portions of the nave were built in the Romanesque style in the 11th century, above an earlier church. In the 13th century the nave was extended and a bell tower was added on the north side. A new choir was added to the building in 1310. In the 16th century the church was rebuilt in the late-Gothic style. New windows were added to the southern nave wall and the ceilings were redone. A strip painting showing three saints is still visible from that project. After the Protestant Reformation, much of the art and sculpture were removed from the building. At some point before the castle was sold to Bern in 1729, the church choir was redone in the Baroque style. The entire building was renovated again in 1781-87. During the renovation, an organ loft and a five-part organ case were added by Karl Josef Maria Bosshardt. In 1937, Ernst Linck and Leo Steck added stained glass windows that represented the history of the church of Köniz. The most recent renovation was in 1981-83.

== List of the Komtur of Köniz ==
- Heinrich, um 1241, 1262
- Burkard, 1256
- Goezinus, 1263
- Konrad von Fischerbach, 1268, 1292
- Burkard von Schwanden, 1275
- Volpert, 1277
- Heinrich von Blansingen, 1279
- Werner Fasser, 1309, 1319
- Konrad Küchlin, 1310
- Otto von Schliengen, 1312
- Konrad von Sigolsheim, 1319-1322
- Peter von Strassburg, 1325-1329
- Konrad von Kramburg, 1331-1338
- Ulrich von Dettingen, 1344
- Hartmann von Ballwil, 1345-1346
- Heinrich von Dettingen, 1348-1355
- Mangold von Brandis, 1356
- Roman von Kuchimeister, 1356
- Werner von Brandis, 1357
- Ulrich von Königsegg, 1357/1358
- Franz Senno, 1364, 1398
- Vinzenz von Bubenberg, 1365-1368
- Friedrich von Ebersberg, 1368
- Günther von Strassburg, 1373-1376
- Arnold Schaler, 1377-1379
- Johann von Gerstungen, 1386-1388
- Johann Böcklin, 1392
- Henmann von Erlach, 1408-1414
- Daniel von Schletten, 1418, 1430
- Hans von Neuenhausen, 1442-1444
- Hans Truchsess von Rheinfelden, 1445-1451
- Henmann von Erlach, 1452-1454
- Rudolf von Rechberg, 1460, 1476
- Andreas Schmitt, 1462
- Christoph Reich von Reichenstein, 1485, 1500
- Rudolf von Andlau, 1497
- Rudolf von Friedingen, 1503-1519
- Albrecht von Breitenlandenberg, 1519-1523
- Hans Heinrich von Vogt von Altensumerau und Prasberg, 1523-1528

== Gallery ==
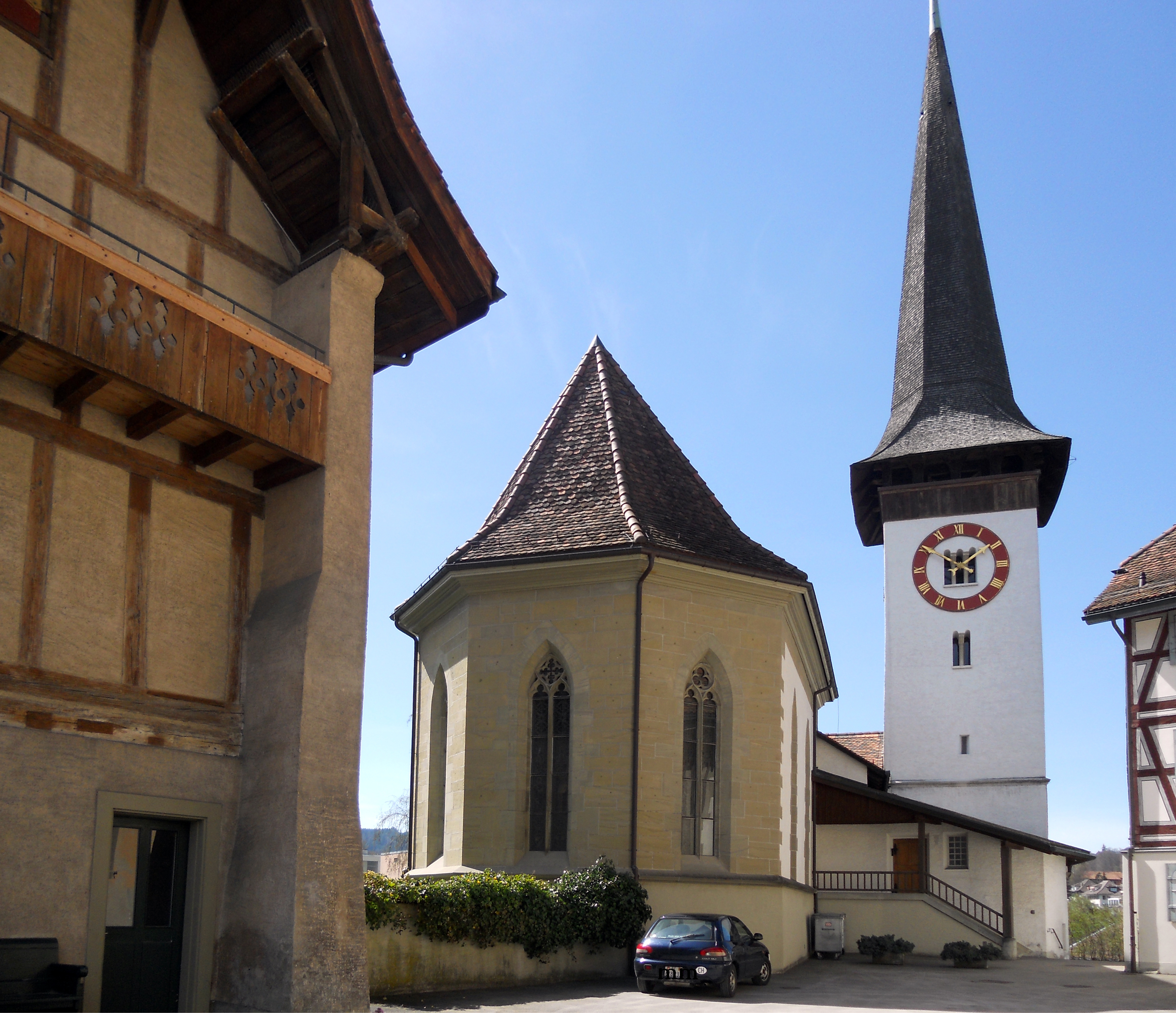
Commandery Church

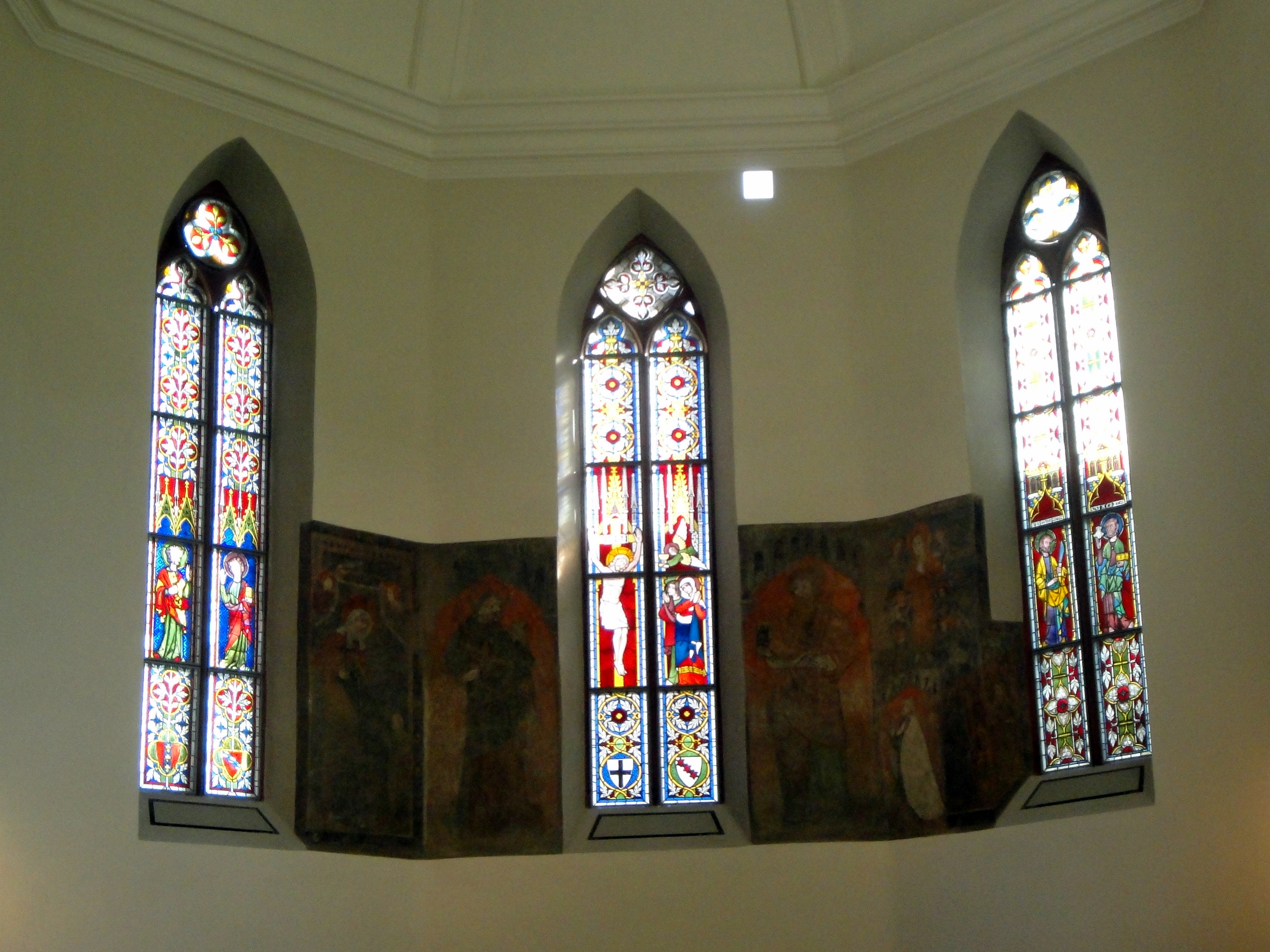
Stained glass inside the Commandery Church

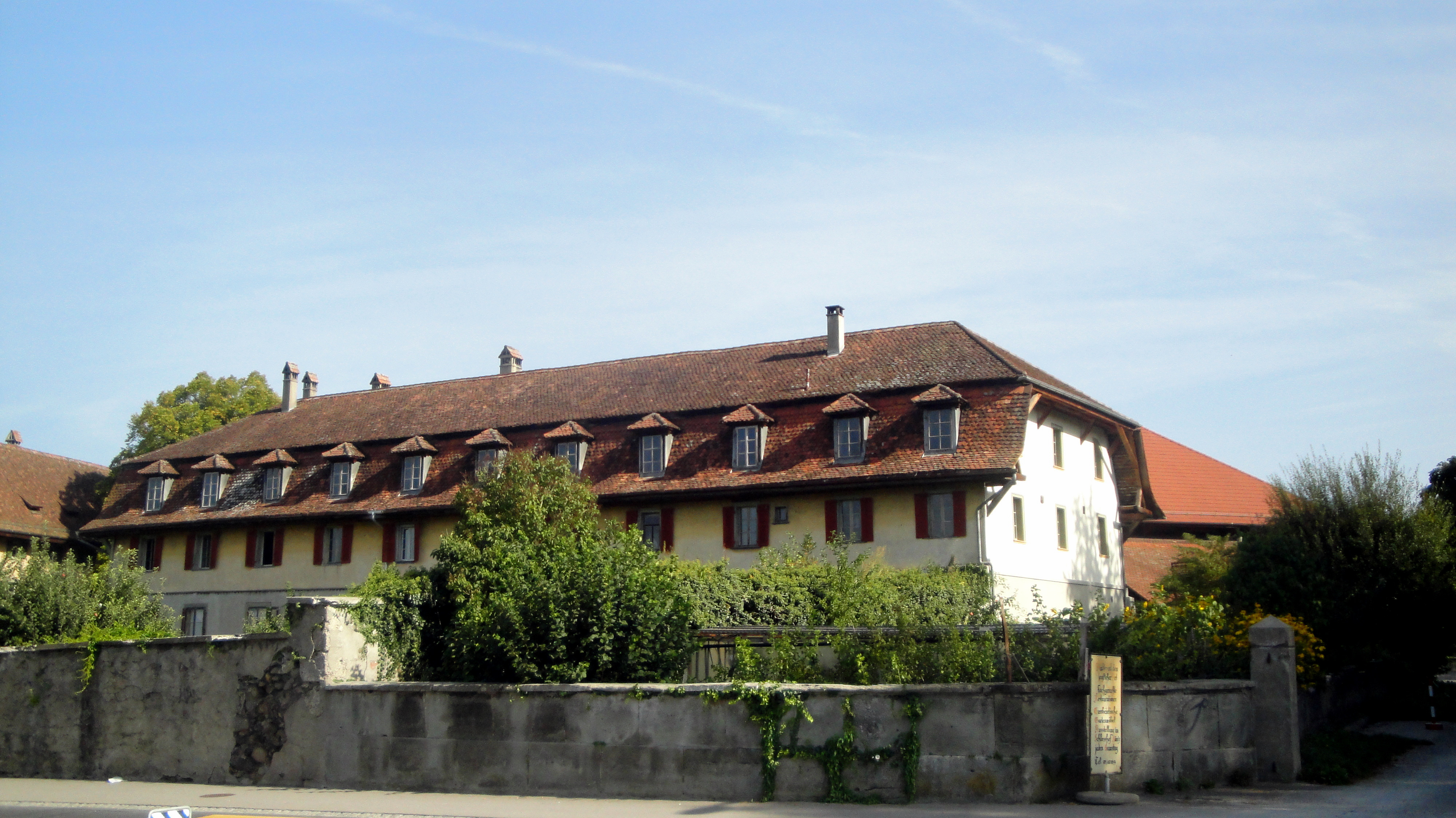
Commandery granary

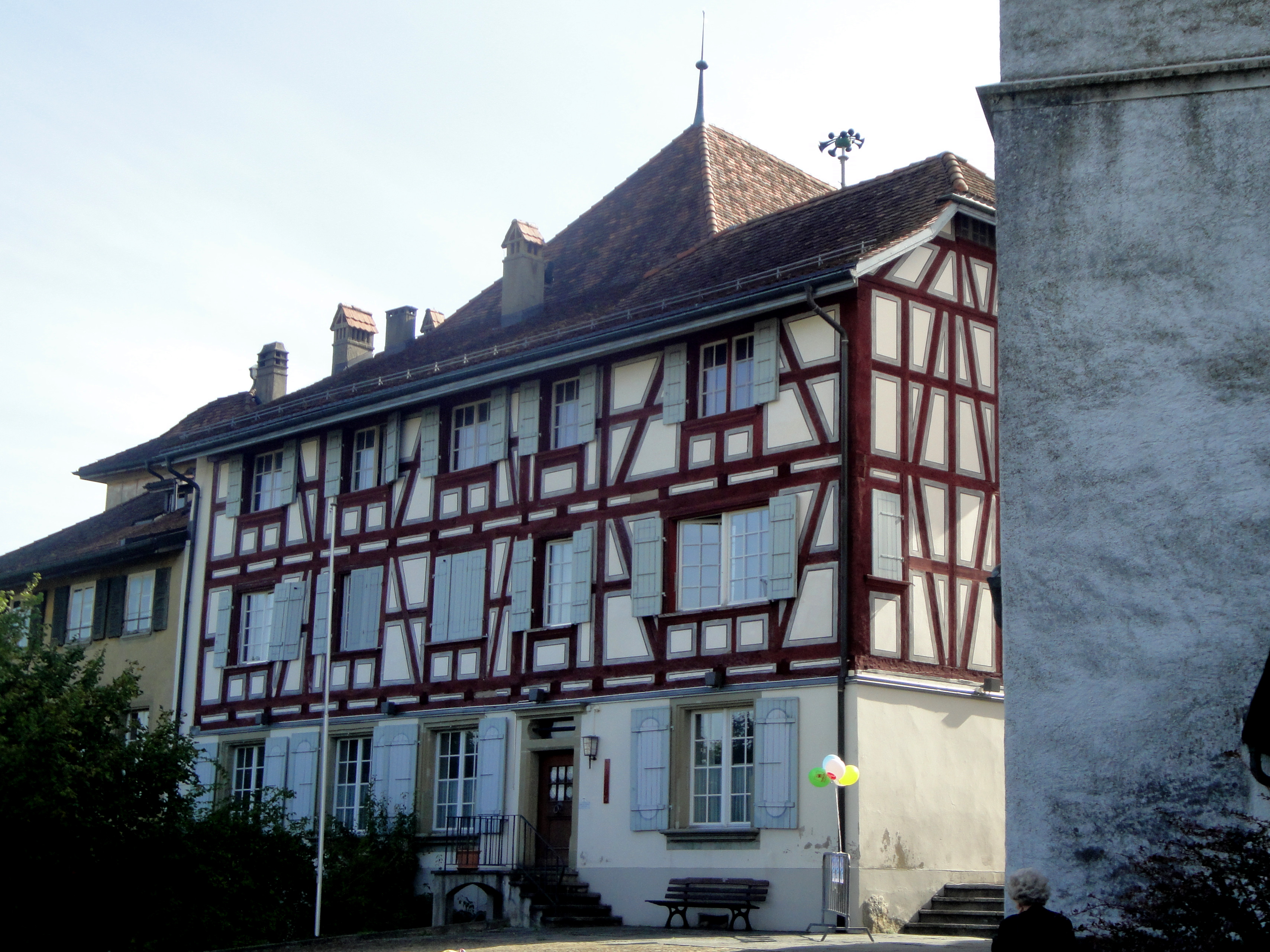
The Knights' hall

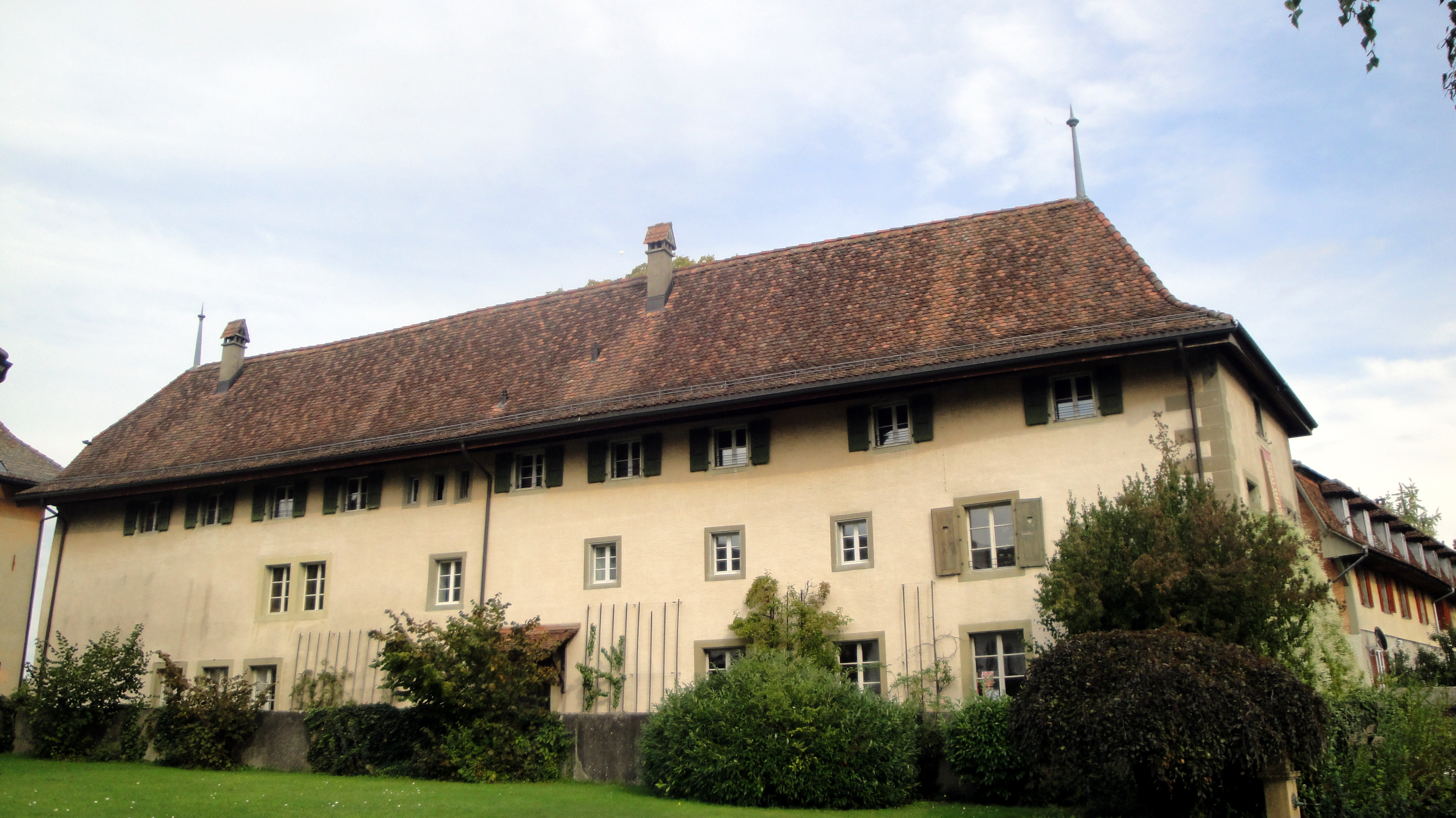
A castle outbuilding, today a school museum and restaurant

== See also ==
- List of castles in Switzerland
