= Realschule Hirschaid =

Location
- Realschulstraße 2-6; Bamberg; Hirschaid, 96114; Germany

Information
- School type: Realschule
- Status: Open
- Head teacher: Herr Arnold
- Staff: 100
- Grades: 5-10
- Age range: 10-19
- Website: www.rs-hirschaid.de

Realschule Hirschaid is a Realschule in the town of Hirschaid, Bamberg, Germany. It stands between the Autobahn and the Rhine–Main–Danube Canal.

== Classes ==
Classes start at 7:50 a.m. and usually end at 12:55, with optional afternoon classes. The school has around eight hundred pupils, between the ages of ten and eighteen. There are about thirty different classes from Grade 5 to Grade 10. Most pupils come by bus because they live in small villages in the periphery of Hirschaid. Some pupils go by train or bike. The train station is in walking distance.

== Staff ==
There are around sixty teachers and fourteen trainee teachers. The Headmaster of the school is Herr Lamprecht.

== Facilities ==
Every classroom has its own computer and projector. The school also has three computer rooms, two classrooms for music (with instruments) and a new assembly hall. Realschule Hirschaid can also offer special rooms for subjects like Arts, Religious Studies, Geography, Chemistry, Biology and Physics.

== Sport ==
The school has a large gymnasium, four table tennis places, facilities for athletic sports, e.g. running, high jump and long jump, two basketball courts and a football pitch. Students may undertake optional afternoon sports classes.
