= Erlach (Hirschaid) =

- Ortsteil of Hirschaid
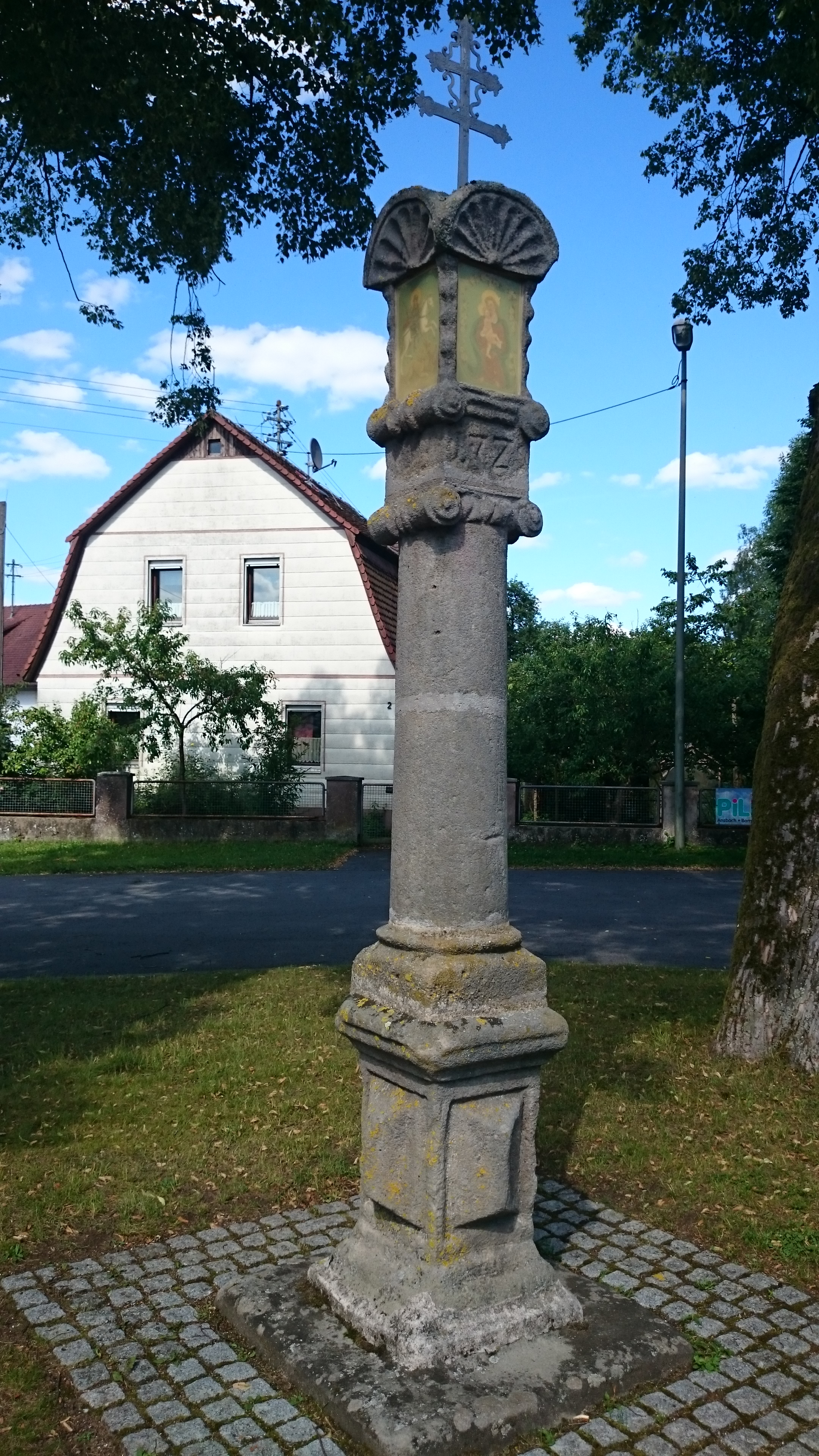
- Interactive map of Erlach
- Location within Germany Location within Bavaria
- Coordinates: 49°48′27″N 10°57′14″E
- Country: Germany
- State: Bavaria
- Admin. region: Upper Franconia
- District: Bamberg
- Municipality: Hirschaid
- Founded: 1062

Population (2019-12-31)
  - Total: 445
- Time zone: UTC+01:00 (CET)
  - Summer (DST): UTC+02:00 (CEST)

Erlach is a small village located in Bavaria, Germany. It is in Upper Franconia, in the Bamberg district. Erlach is a constituent community of Hirschaid.

In 2019, the village had a population of 445.

== Geography ==
Erlach lies about 12 kilometers south of Bamberg.

A stream called the Reiche Ebrach flows through the village. The Rhine–Main–Danube Canal is east of the village.

== History ==
The town was first mentioned in 1062 as Sconen erlaha ("the beautiful Erlach").

Today there is a small church, consecrated in 1954, with a cemetery attached to it.

A school was built in 1918, but it is no longer used today. The village also has one of the oldest mills in the region.

== Culture ==
There are several community organizations based in Erlach, including:

- "1. FC Eintracht Erlach e. V.": Sports club
- "Bayerischer Bauernverband": Bavarian farmers' association
- "Freiwillige Feuerwehr Erlach": Volunteer fire department
- "Jagdgenossenschaft Erlach": Hunting organization
- "Obst- und Gartenbauverein Erlach e.V.": Fruit and horticulture club
- "Ortskulturring Erlach": Local culture club
- "Soldatenkameradschaft Erlach": Veteran's group
- "Verein 'Gemütlichkeit' Erlach": Local culture club
