= Erlach family =

Bernese patrician family

Erlach
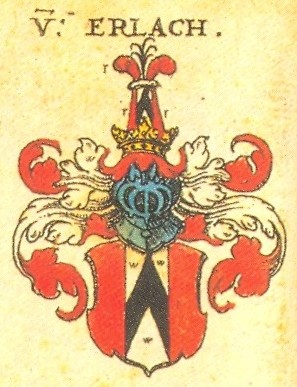
- Country: Bern, Switzerland
- Founded: Before 1299
- Titles: Reichsgraf

The Erlach family was a Bernese patrician family. They first became citizens of Bern around 1300. During the 17th and 18th centuries they were one of the leading families in Bern. For centuries the family served as senior military commanders in both Bern and in foreign armies. They were mayors of Bern and ruled over many other towns and cities in western Switzerland. Several family members received the upper nobility title "Reichsgraf".

== From landless knights to mayors of Bern ==
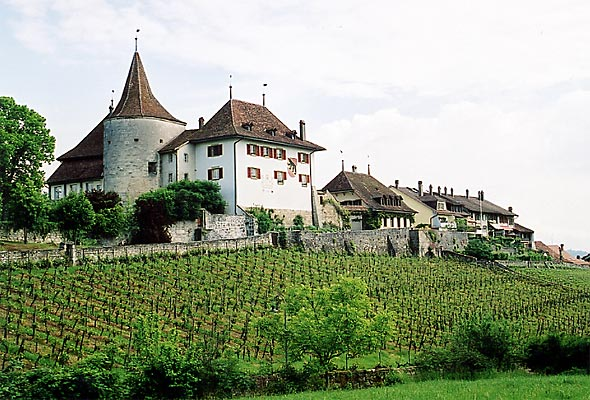
Erlach Castle

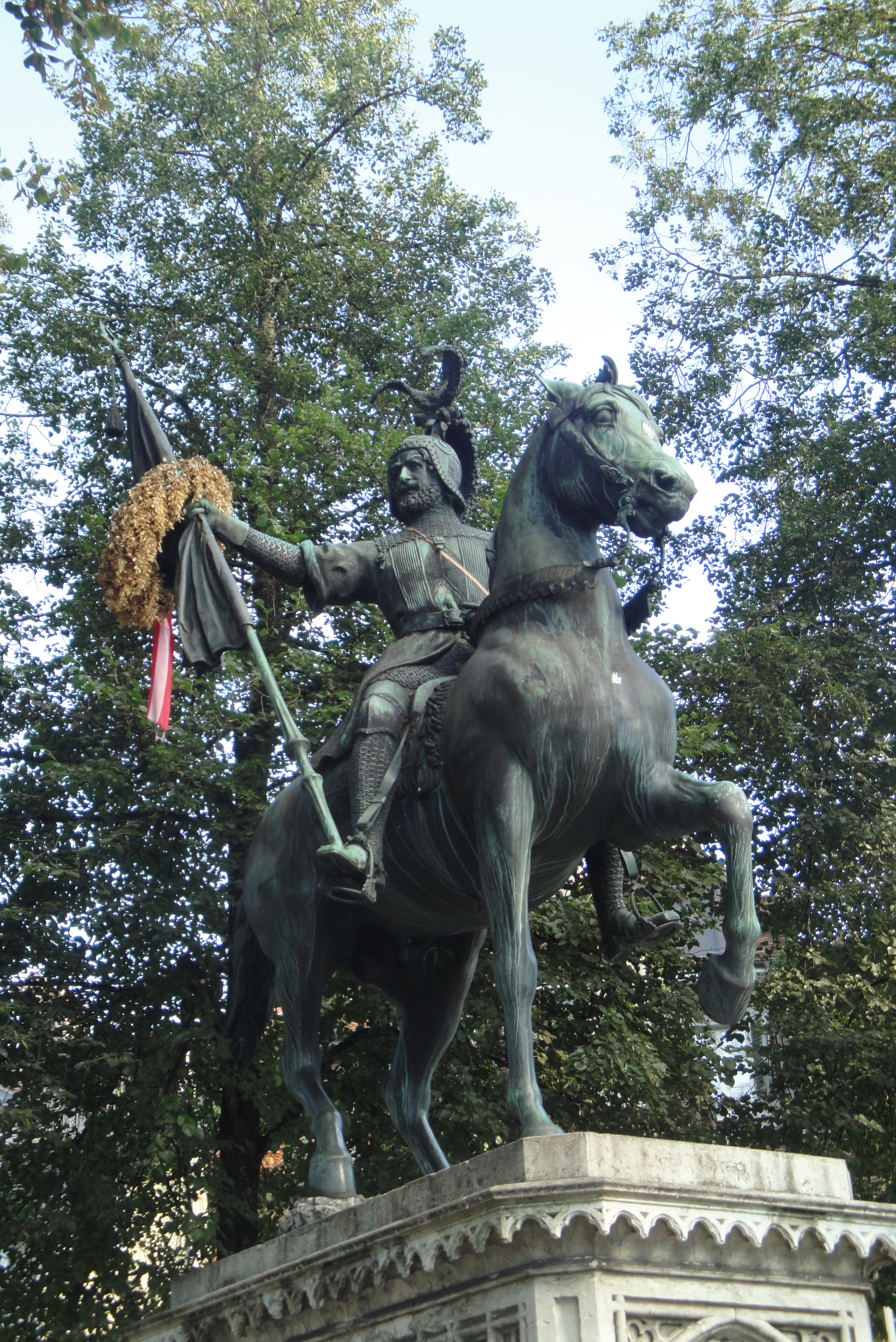
The Rudolf von Erlach memorial in Bern

The Erlach family is first mentioned as a ministerialis (or unfree knight) family in the service of the Counts of Nidau. Initially they were the castellans in Erlach Castle in the town of Erlach on Lake Biel. By 1300 they were citizens of Bern and had tied their fate to the city. According to the historian Conrad Justinger, in 1339 Rudolf von Erlach led the victorious Bernese forces at the Battle of Laupen. In the following year he led a Bernese army in a raid on the city of Fribourg. Before his death, in 1360, Rudolf bought property and governance rights in Jegenstorf and Reichenbach Castle (in Zollikofen).

In the 15th century they added the municipalities and villages of Hindelbank, Jegenstorf, Wyl (now part of Münchenbuchsee), Riggisberg and Bümpliz. They began to take a major role in politics in the city of Bern and married into a number of noble and wealthy patrician families. By the mid 15th century, Ulrich (died 1465) became the first of seven von Erlach Schultheissen (or Mayors) to serve in the city of Bern.

The next von Erlach family member to serve as Schultheiss was Rudolf (born 1448, died 1507). He was Schultheiss from 1479 until 1507 with several short interruptions. While still a member of the Kleinrat (small council) he led Bernese troops to besiege Grandson and Murten during the Burgundian Wars in 1476. During the Swabian War of 1499, Rudolf once again took command of a Bernese army and fought in the Hegau region and in the Battle of Dornach. Rudolf divided the family estates between his two sons, Johann (1474–1539) and Diebold (1485–1561).

== The family divides ==
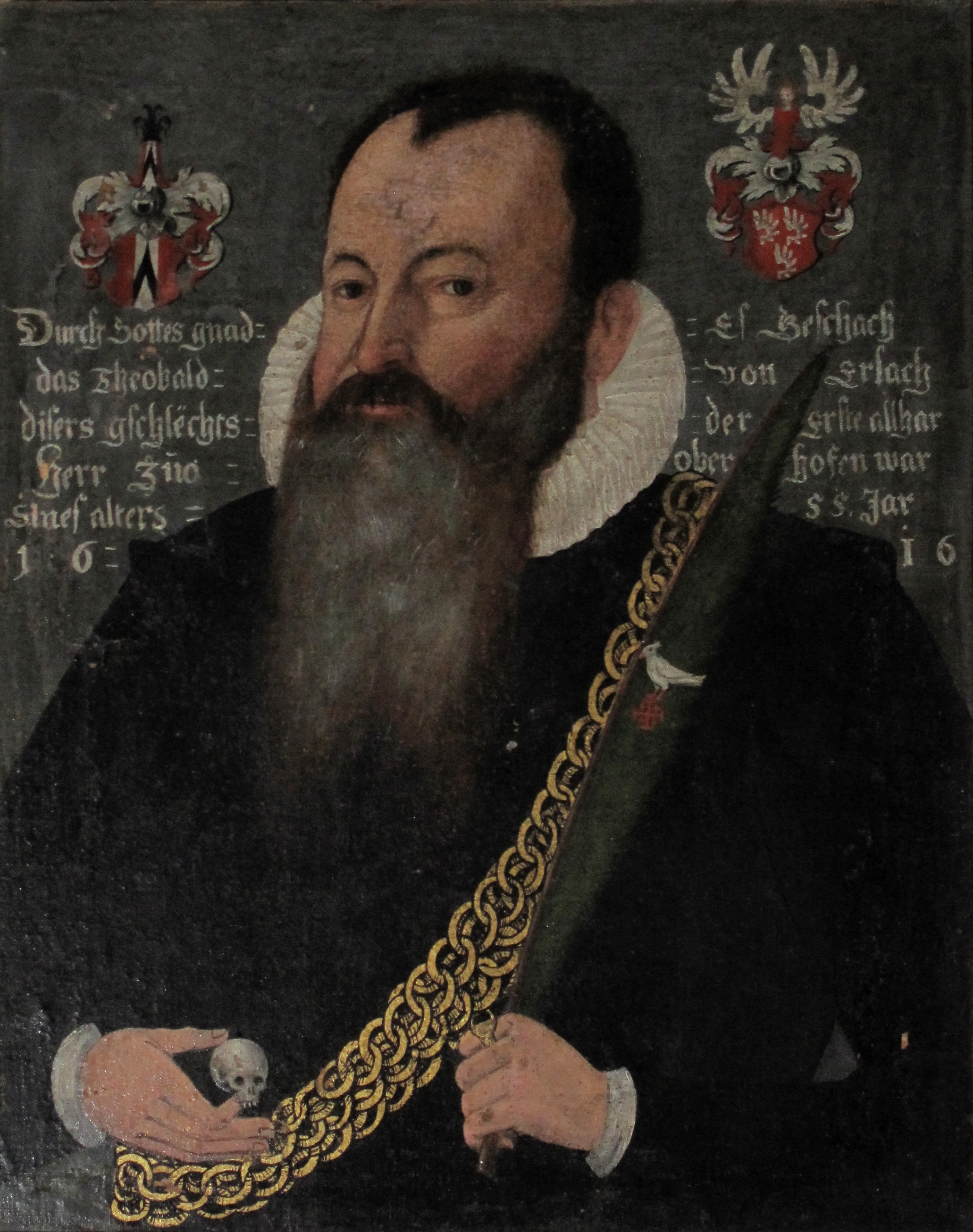
Diebold von Erlach also called Theobald von Erlach.

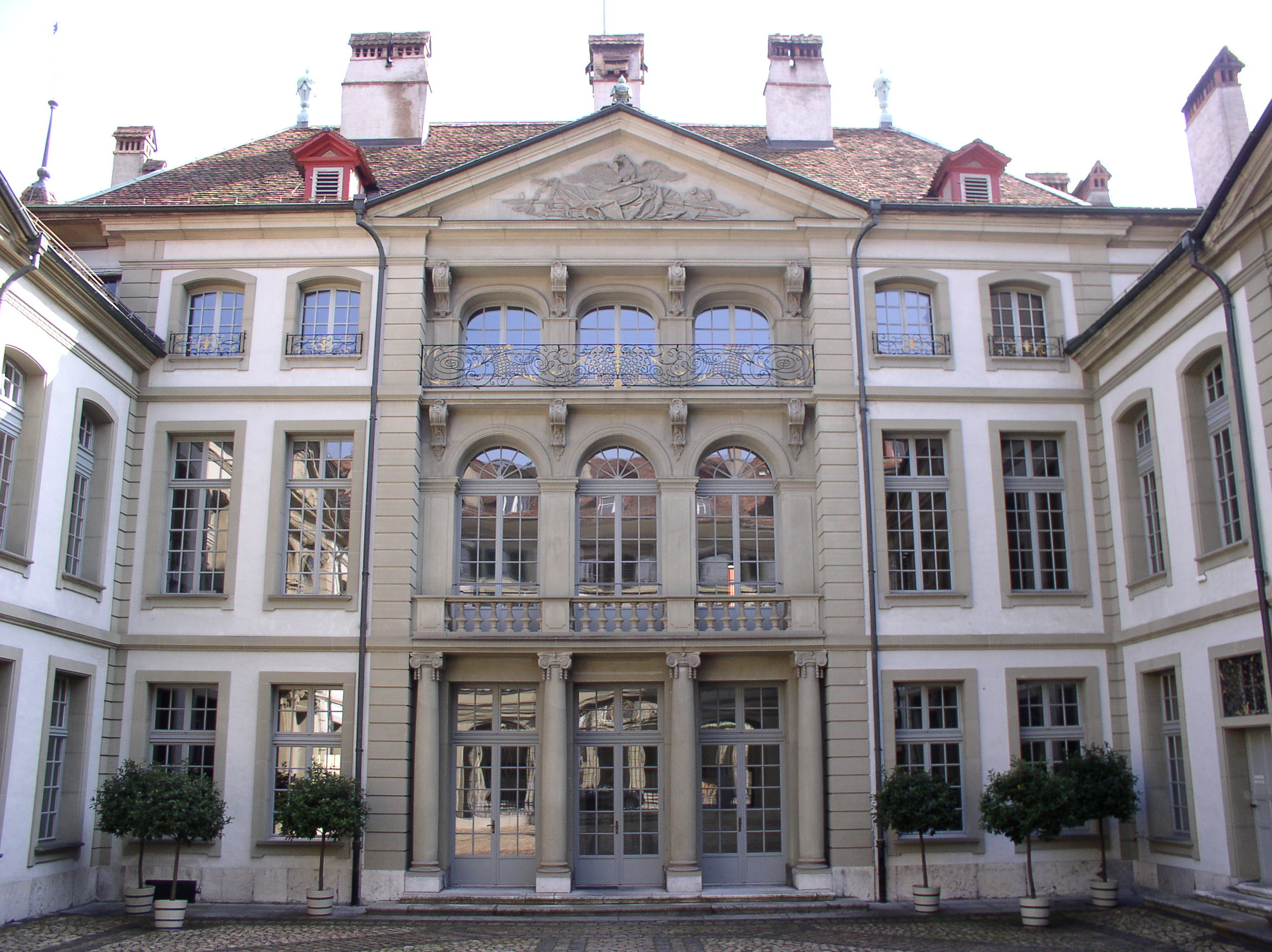
Erlacherhof on Junkerngasse in Bern

Rudolf's younger son, Diebold was given the family's estates in Bümpliz (now part of Bern). His descendants extended their estates to include Oberhofen am Thunersee, Kiesen and Kasteln. Diebold emigrated to America in the middle of the 16th century. However, Diebold's branch never had the political or economic power of the rest of the family. In the 18th century that line died out.

Johann inherited the remainder of Rudolf's land and rights. He followed in his father's footsteps and entered a career in politics and the military. He was sent as an ambassador from the Swiss Confederation to Neuchâtel in 1511 and in 1512 met with the Duke of Savoy in Geneva and then traveled to Milan to meet with the Pope. In 1513 he led an army toward Dijon and in 1515 marched on Milan. He became the third Schultheiss in 1519 and served, with interruptions, for twenty years. In 1528, Bern adopted the new faith of the Protestant Reformation and when the Oberland rebelled against the new faith, Johann marched as commander of an army to put down the rebellion. In the following years, he led the Protestant Bernese army in the First and Second Wars of Kappel.

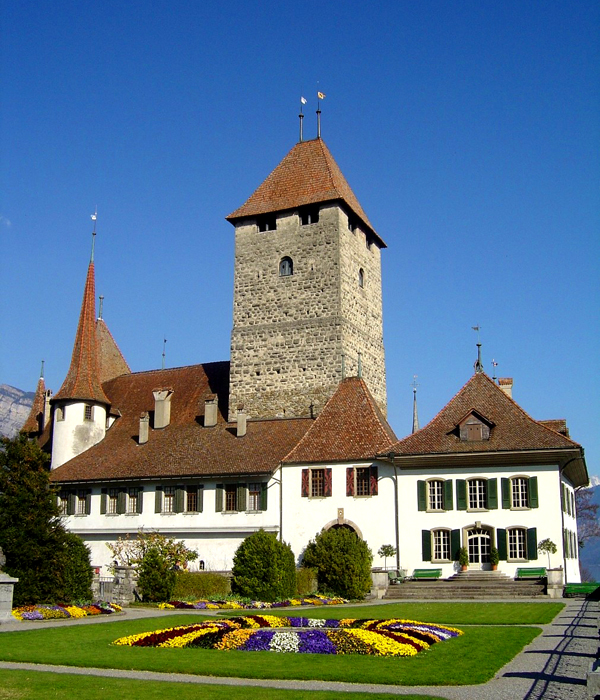
Spiez Castle

After Johann's death, the family estates were again divided between his two sons. Another family member, Ludwig von Erlach (1470–1522) had acquired the castle and town of Spiez and the Bubenberghäuser on Junkerngasse in Bern. After Johann's death the castle and the Bubenberghäuser were inherited by Johann's older son Hans Rudolf (1504–53). The remainder of the estates were inherited by his younger sons.

Hans Rudolf inherited estates in Spiez, Schadau, Bümpliz and Oberhofen as well as the house in Bern. Hans Rudolf's grandson Franz Ludwig (4 January 1575 – 1651) became the fourth von Erlach to become the Schultheiss of Bern. He was a member of the Grossrat (large council) in Bern after 1596 and was the Schultheiss of Burgdorf from 1604 until 1610. He was the Schultheiss in Bern from 1629 until 1651.

== Foreign military service ==
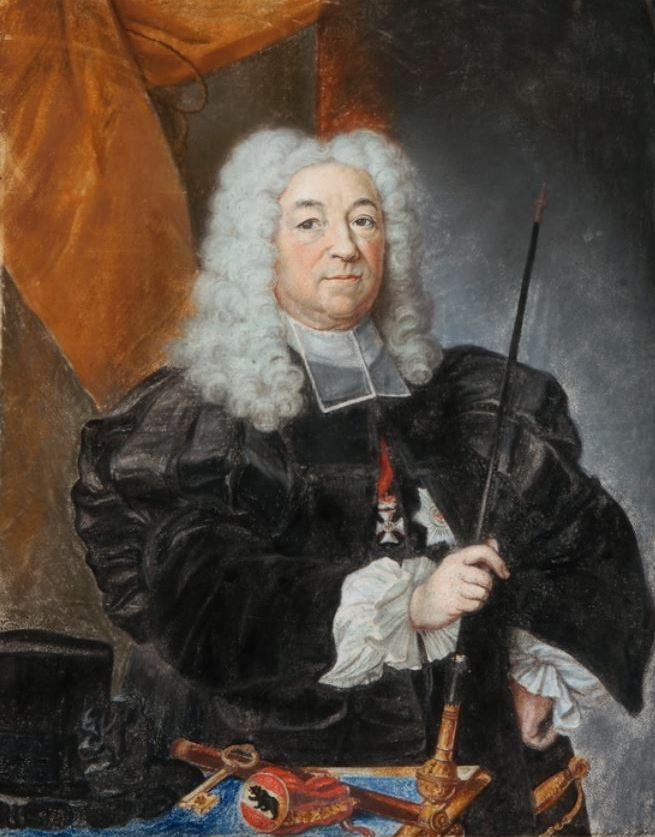
Hieronymus von Erlach

In the 17th century many of the von Erlach family left Switzerland to find work as Swiss mercenaries, often in service to the King of France. Johann Jakob von Erlach (25 May 1628 – 1694) became the first commander of the Bernese regiment in the French army in 1671. He rose to the rank of Lieutenant-General in 1688, but then converted to Catholicism and lost all his Bernese titles and his citizenship in Bern.

His relative Sigmund (3 October 1614 – 7 December 1699) was more successful. He rose to the rank of Colonel in service with Bernard of Saxe-Weimar and became a Major-General in the French army. When he returned home, he entered a career in politics becoming a member of the Grosser Rat in 1645. A few years later, Sigmund led Confederation troops successfully against the rebels in the Swiss peasant war of 1653. However, he was not as lucky in the 1st Battle of Villmergen in 1656. The Catholic forces were successful and the resulting treaty was unpopular in Bern. While Sigmund was heavily criticized for his defeat, his political career was unharmed. He was elected as the fifth von Erlach Schultheiss in 1675 and held the office until 1699. He died wealthy, successful but childless, so his estates passed on to other relatives.

Another cousin, Hieronymus von Erlach (31 March 1667 Bern-28 February 1748), reached even higher. He initially served in the Bernese regiment in the French army, but in 1702 he was a colonel of a regiment in the Imperial Austrian army during the War of the Spanish Succession. Early successes brought him promotions and in 1704 he was made a lieutenant field marshal. His star continued to rise, despite suspicions that he leaked Austrian plans to the French. In 1710 Emperor Joseph I made Hieronymus his chamberlain. Two years later Emperor Charles VI gave him the title of Reichsgraf or Imperial Count. A few years later he returned to Bern and entered politics and became the sixth von Erlach Schultheiss from 1721 until 1746.

== The family spreads and grows ==
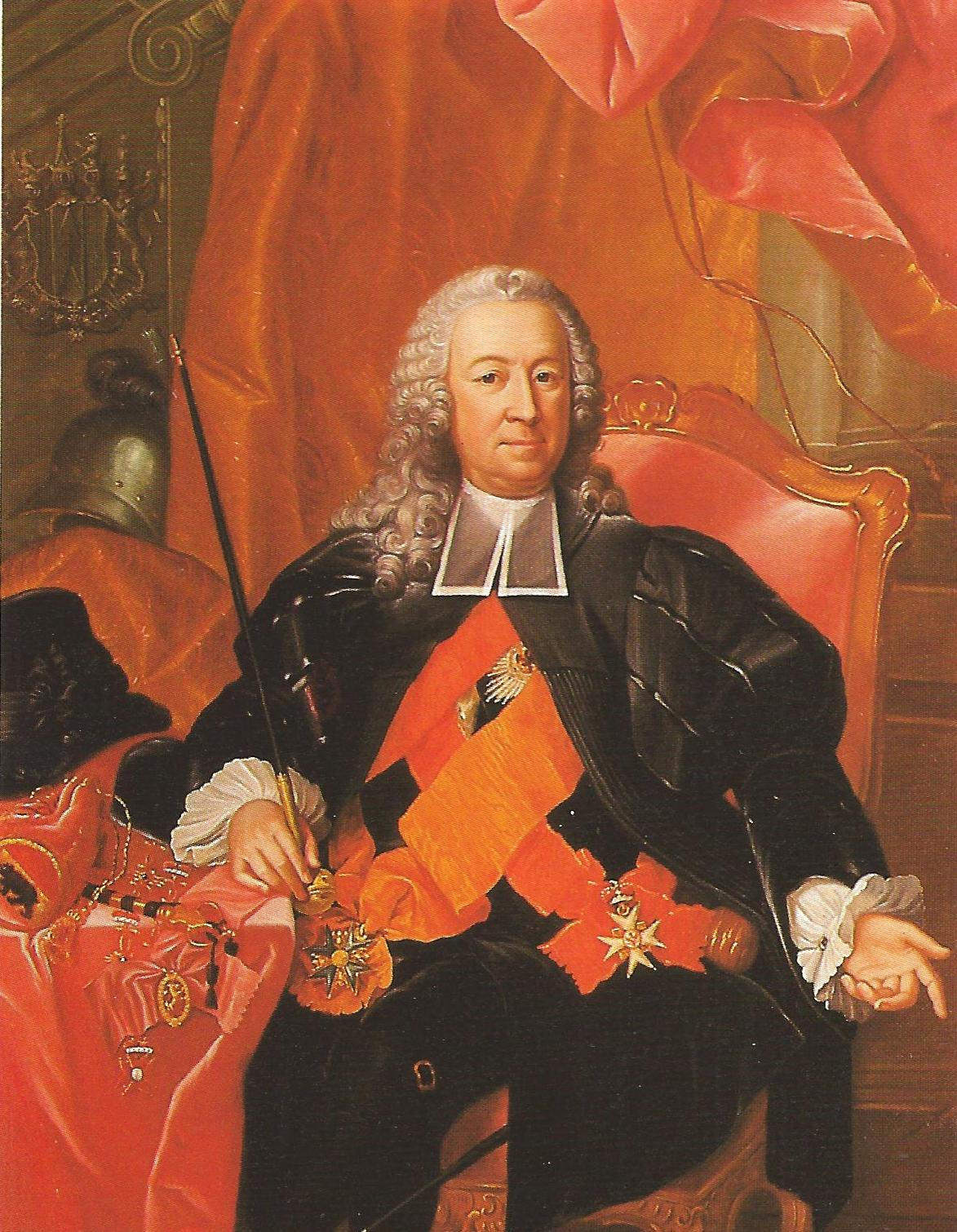
Albrecht Friedrich von Erlach as Schultheiss (mayor) of Bern

By the 17th and 18th centuries they were one of the six of the wohledelfesten families, who formed the highest class of Bernese patrician families. By the 18th century much of the elder line had died out or intermarried with the younger line. The estates, including Spiez Castle and the Bubenberghäuser, were now owned by descendants of Johann's younger sons. Albrecht von Erlach (1713–84) built a new castle next to the older Castle in Spiez. His cousin, Hieronymus (1667–1748), had a successful military and political career, and became the largest land holder in Bern. In 1745, he demolished the Bubenberghäuser and in its place had the Erlacherhof built. Unfortunately the mansion was not completed until about four years after Hieronymus' death. Other members of the family built new mansions and continued expanding their wealth and political power.

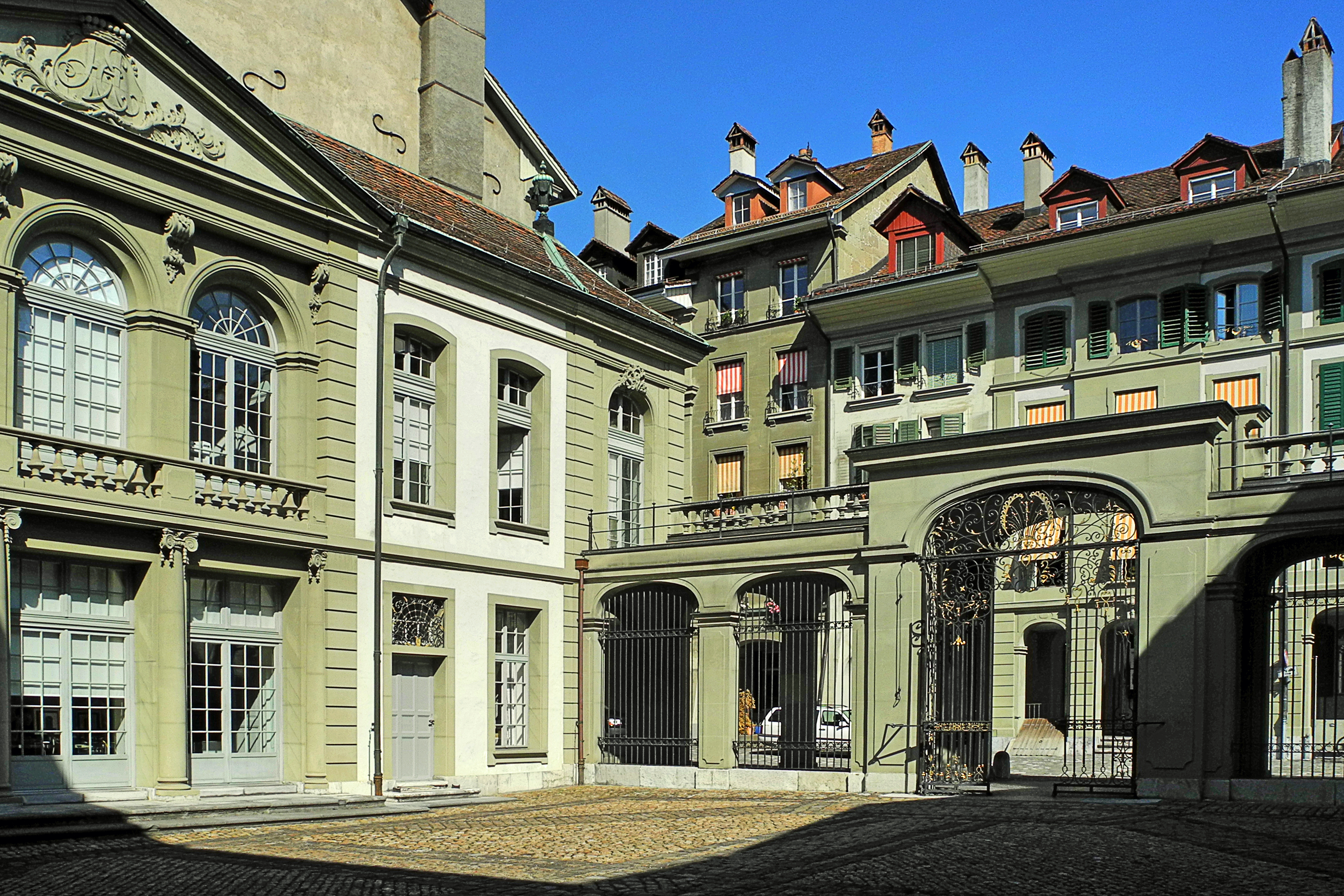
Erlacherhof courtyard

Hieronymus' son, Albrecht Friedrich (15 November 1696 – 27 August 1788), followed in his father's footsteps. He served in the Austrian army until he entered politics in Bern in 1727. In 1735, he was appointed chamberlain for Charles VI. After his father's death in 1748 he oversaw completion of the Erlacherhof in Bern. In 1759 he became the seventh von Erlach who was elected as Schultheiss, a position that he held several times until 1786.

During the 18th century a branch of the Erlach family settled in France and became fixtures in the Swiss Guard. Another branch joined the armies of Saxony-Anhalt and then Prussia. They eventually married into the local nobility and became firmly Prussian. By the mid 19th century both branches had died out, though the main line in Switzerland remained strong.

== French invasion of Switzerland ==
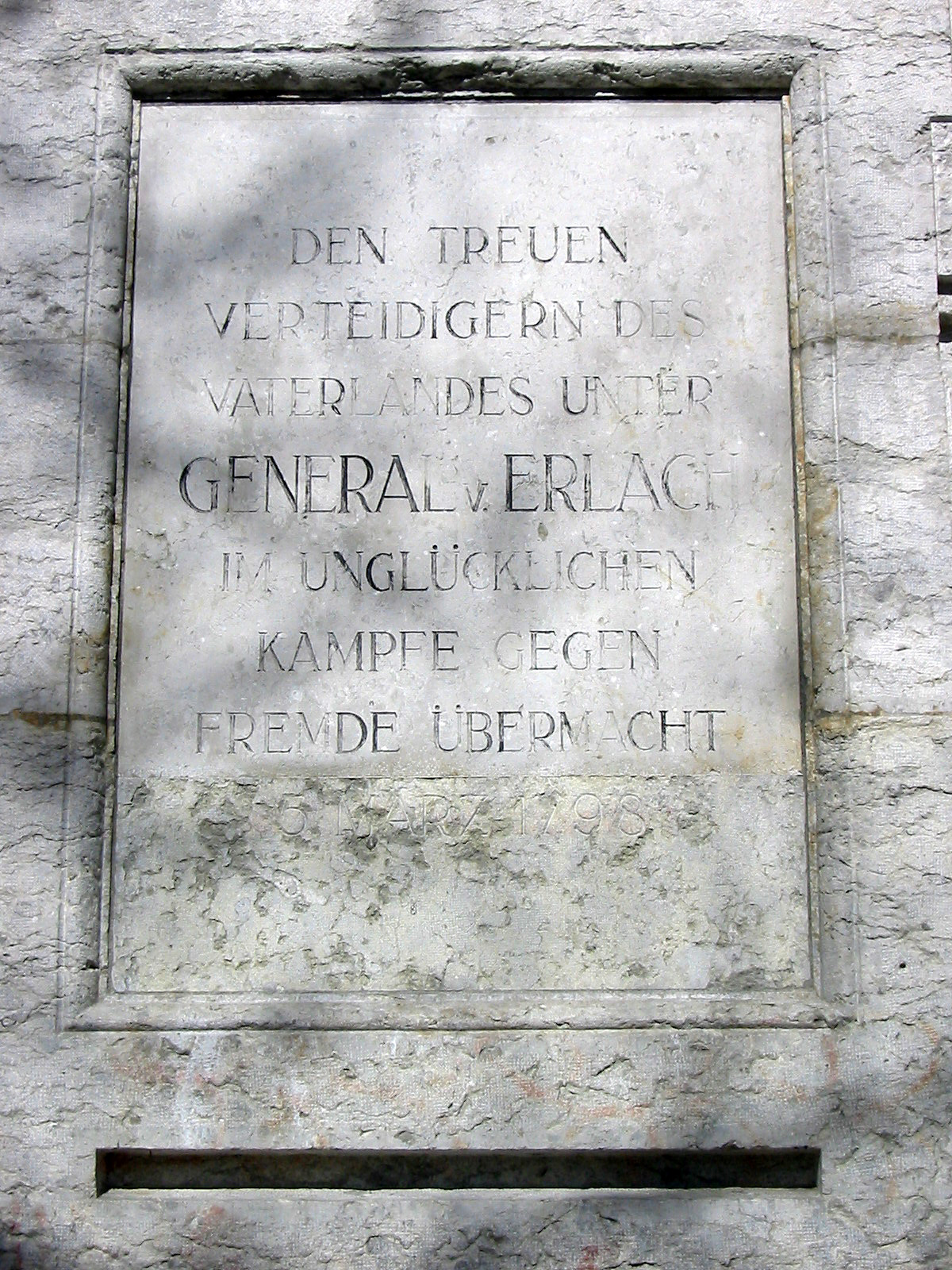
Tablet on the Grauholz memorial

In March 1798, the French Revolutionary Army swept into Switzerland. They invaded at the invitation of the Republican faction in Vaud, led by Frédéric-César de La Harpe. Vaud was under Bernese control, but chafed under a government with a different language and culture. The ideals of the French Revolution found a receptive audience in Vaud, and when Vaud declared itself a republic the French had a pretext to invade the confederation.

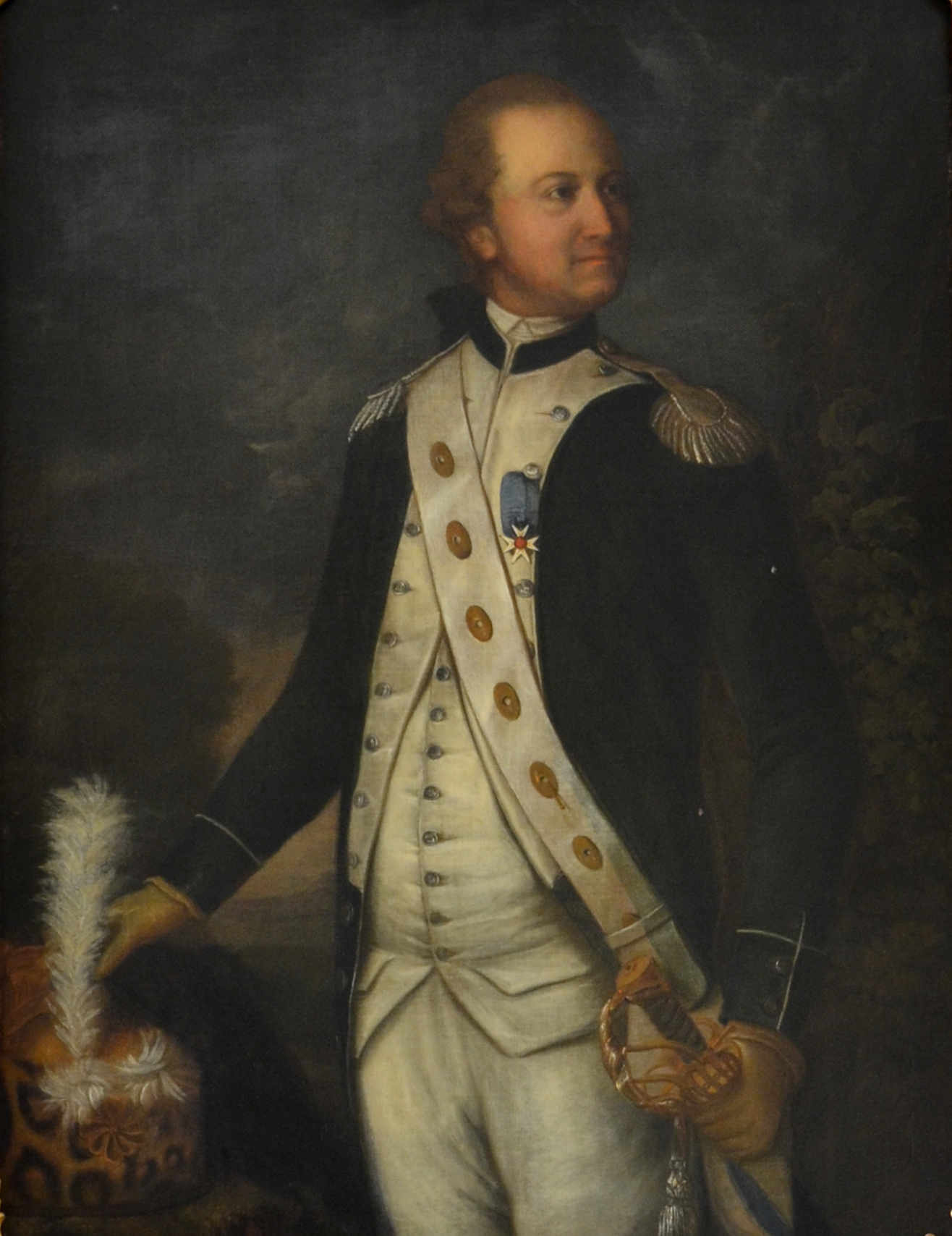
Karl Ludwig von Erlach

At the end of the 18th century, the increasingly powerful oligarchs, such as the von Erlach family, were widely hated by the majority of the Swiss. Most of the country was quickly captured by peasants who believed the ideals of the French Revolution would be better than the current system. Bern was the only Canton to field an effective army to repel the invaders. A Bernese army marched out to meet the French, under General Karl Ludwig von Erlach. Despite the Bernese government capitulating on 4 March 1798, the Bernese troops prepared to fight the invaders. They met the French at the Battle of Fraubrunnen but were driven back to Grauholz, a wooded hill near Bern. By this time General Erlach only had about two battalions of soldiers. While they held for several hours, in the end General von Erlach retreated with a portion of his army. He attempted to hold the Schosshalde and Felsenburg, the entrance to the Untertorbrücke and the city of Bern, but was unsuccessful. He then traveled south, preparing to move into the Bernese Oberland and organize a resistance. However, at Wichtrach he was attacked by either Bernese soldiers or farmers, who believed him to be a traitor, and murdered.

Once Bern's resistance collapsed, the French quickly established the Helvetic Republic on the principles of the French Revolution. The old feudal landlord and peasant structure was swept away. The von Erlach family had held the right to hold high and low courts or Zwing und Bann rights in many of the villages which they owned. Under the Republic the von Erlach family and all other Swiss nobles and patricians lost their traditional rights and the income that they had received. They no longer ruled over their peasants, however, they were allowed to keep the land that they owned. In 1802 some members of the family participated in the Stecklikrieg, an uprising that destroyed the Republic and led to the 1803 Act of Mediation.

== The family in the 20th and 21st century ==
While the von Erlach family lost their position at the center of Bernese politics, they remained wealthy. Many members of the family followed the tradition of joining the military or entering politics. Rudolf von Erlach (27 January 1891 – 7 August 1944) was a member of the Swiss General Staff and commanded Gebirgsbrigade 12 and later the 5. Division in Switzerland during World War II. Today members of the family occupy positions in banking, insurance and industry.

== Notable members ==
- Rudolf von Erlach (around 1299 – 1360) was a knight and victorious commander of the Swiss Confederation forces at the Battle of Laupen.
- Sigmund von Erlach (October 3, 1614 – December 7, 1699; sometimes given as "Sigismund von Erlach") was a Swiss military commander and a politician of Bern.
- Diebold von Erlach (1541–1565) was the first Swiss citizen in America

== Archive resources ==
- Staatsarchiv Bern, FA von Erlach I (1234–1990)
- Staatsarchiv Bern, FA von Erlach II (1369–1825), Zweig Gerzensee
- Staatsarchiv Bern, FA von Erlach III (1343–20 Jh.), Zweig Hindelbank
- Staatsarchiv Bern, FA von Erlach IV (17 Jh.–20 Jh.), Nachlass Hans-Ulrich von Erlach
- Burgerbibliothek Bern, Bestände zur Familie von Erlach

== Literature ==
- Hans Ulrich von Erlach: 800 Jahre Berner von Erlach. Die Geschichte einer Familie, Benteli, Bern 1989.
- Rolf Hasler: Der Wappenscheibenzyklus der Familie von Erlach aus der Schlosskirche Spiez, In: Schweizer Archiv für Heraldik: 117(2003), Nr. 1, S. 9–32.
- Ludwig Robert von Erlach von Hindelbank 1794–1879. In: Burgdorfer Jahrbuch: 1981, S. 13–86 und 1982, S. 13–77.
- Ernst Troesch: Hieronymus von Erlach 1667–1748. In: Jahrbuch des Oberaargaus. Jg. 24(1981), S. 109–120.
