= Battle of Laupen =

Battle in 1339 between Bern and Freiburg

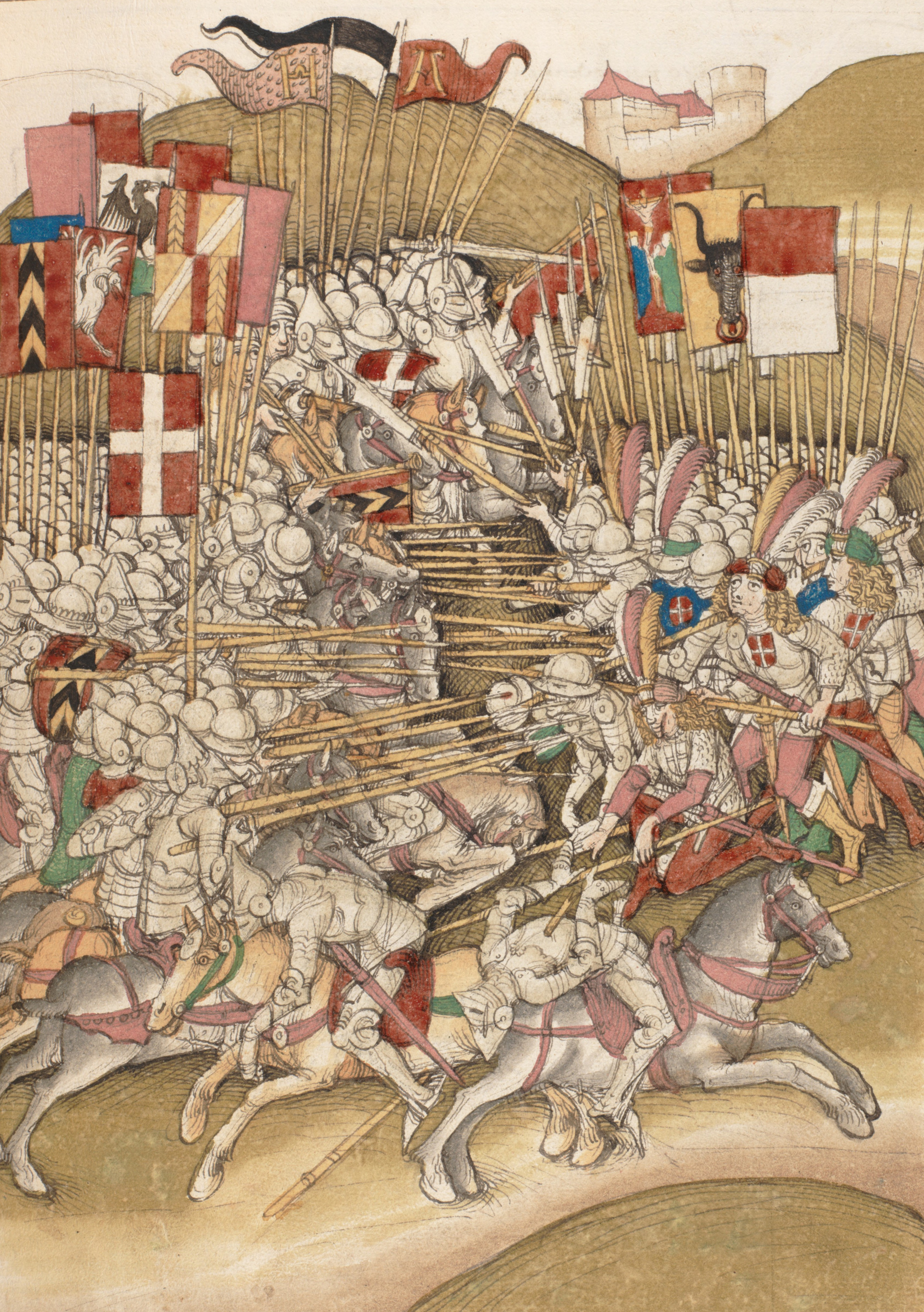
- Illustration by Diebold Schilling the Elder (Spiez chronicle, 1480s) showing the cavalry engagement of the Forest Cantons.
Date	21 June 1339
Location	Laupen, Bern (46°55′N 7°17′E)
Result	Bernese victory, tightening of the Bernese-Swiss relationship resulting in Bern's permanent accession to the Swiss Confederacy in 1353.

Belligerents
Bern and allies: Solothurn; Murten; Payerne; Burgdorf; Thun; Hasli; Lords of Weissenburg Old Swiss Confederacy: Uri; Schwyz; Unterwalden	Fribourg; County of Neuchâtel; Valangin; County of Gruyères; County of Savoy; County of Aarberg; County of Nidau; Belp-Montenach; Bishopric of Basel; Bishopric of Sion; Bishopric of Lausanne; Duchy of Austria (not engaged) County of Kyburg

Commanders and leaders
Rudolf von Erlach	Rudolf III von Nidau; Gérard de Valengin

Strength
6,000, including 1,000 from the Forest Cantons	16,000 infantry, 1,000 cavalry

Casualties and losses
Unknown	1–1,500

The Battle of Laupen was fought in June 1339, between Bern and its allies on one side, and Freiburg together with feudal landholders from the County of Burgundy and Habsburg territories on the other. Bern was victorious, consolidating its position in the region. As a consequence of the conflict, the relations of Bern and the Swiss Confederacy tightened, resulting in Bern's permanent accession in 1353.

This is also the first battle that the white cross was documented as being used as a field sign worn by Swiss combatants.

== Background ==
Prior to hostilities the free imperial city of Bern had undergone heavy expansion, however this expansion came at high expense to the feudal lords in the area and led to increasing competition with the neighbouring city of Fribourg. Bern had been allied with Fribourg since 1241, but Fribourg had been sold to the House of Habsburg in 1277.

Fribourg entered a league with neighbouring feudal lords, including the County of Neuchâtel, the County of Savoy and the Prince-Bishop of Basel, raising a force of some 17,000 men, including a force of some 1,000 heavy cavalry under the command of Rudolf von Nidau and Gérard de Valengin. While the cavalry were a powerful force, much of the infantry, with the exception of the Freiburg contingent, were poorly equipped and unmotivated

This force set out to confront Bern by besieging Laupen Castle. To raise the siege, Bern raised a force of 6,000, consisting of Bernese, supported by Forest Cantons of Uri, Schwyz and Unterwalden (who had entered a military alliance with Bern in 1323), and other allies (Simmental, Weissenburg, Oberhasli).

The Habsburg Duke of Austria and the Count of Kyburg assembled a force in Aargau and threatened Bern from the east. This is likely the reason that the relief force sent to Laupen was not led by the Bernese Schultheiss, Johann II von Bubenberg, who would have remained in the city preparing for a possible siege.

== The battle ==
The Bernese army marched to the relief of Laupen, arriving in the afternoon of 21 June. Rather than attempt an attack on the Freiburger siege lines, they drew up their army on a hill called the Bramberg, some 3 km east-northeast of Laupen Castle, as a challenge to their enemies to come and fight. The formation of the Bernese consisted of one or more haufen, deep bodies of infantry. To one flank, probably the left, stood the troops of the Forest Cantons. The arrival of the Bernese was noted by the Freiburgers and they rapidly armed and arrayed themselves for battle. Late in the afternoon, they launched their attack.

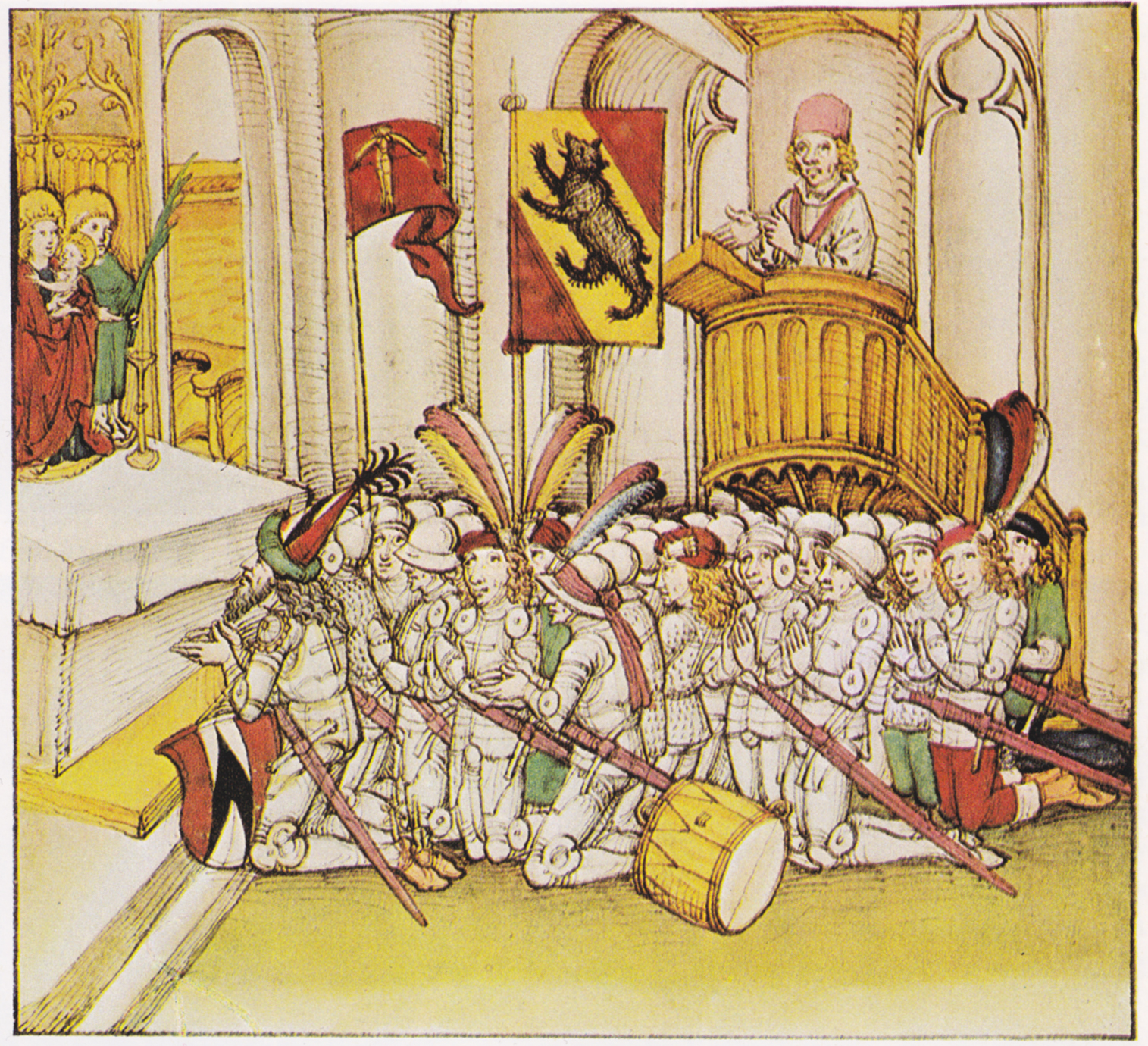
Prayer of the Bernese before the battle. Rudolf von Erlach is shown with his coat of arms, kneeling next to the altar.

The Freiburg force was led by their cavalry, followed by the larger body of infantry. An unknown number of troops were left in the siege camp, to protect the equipment and prevent a sally by the 600 strong Bernese garrison. The cavalry vanguard moved to threaten the Bernese, with a number of newly dubbed knights riding close to the Bernese lines waving their swords, but the Bernese force held its position. When the Freiburg infantry formed up, the cavalry launched an assault which brought them into contact with the Forest Canton contingent, who rapidly formed an all-round defensive formation known as a hedgehog (Igel). Away from this flank action, the Freiburger infantry advanced up the hill. The Bernese threw forward a screen of crossbowmen and stone-throwers to harass this advance but these quickly fell back as the Freiburgers closed. This seems to have caused a panic in the rear ranks of the Bernese army and a large number (up to 2,000) men fled into the forest behind the Bramberg. Remarkably, the rest of the army held firm. The two infantry lines then clashed. Despite their numerical advantage, the Freiburgers were quickly broken and fled away towards Laupen, the flight being led by the feudal contingent from Vaud. The contingent from Freiburg suffered particularly heavily, losing their Burgomeister and the City standard bearer. Showing great control, a part of the Bernese army reordered itself and marched to relieve the Forest Cantons, who were still surrounded by the Freiburger's cavalry. The action here was possibly the fiercest of the day, with the horsemen now fighting on two fronts themselves. After a short bloody struggle, the cavalry were routed and suffered heavy casualties. At least 80 nobles fell, including the Counts of Nidau, Valengin and Aarburg and the son of Louis II of Vaud. The evening was now drawing on, which limited pursuit, but the Bernese forces marched into Laupen, where celebrations and services of thanksgiving for the victory were held.

== Aftermath ==
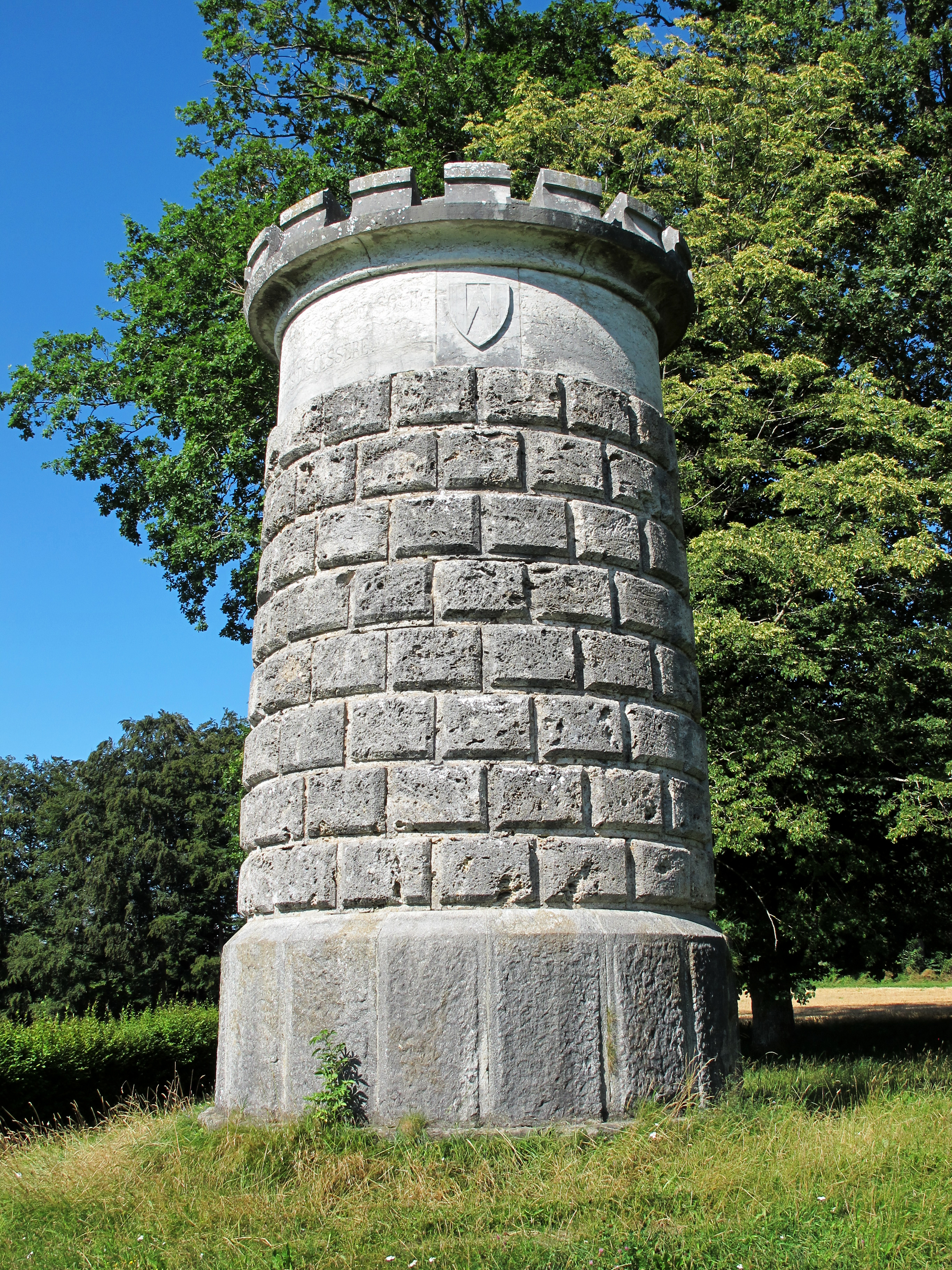
Monument to the battle on Bramberg, Neuenegg municipality, design by Karl Marcell Heigelin (1798–1833), inscribed In memoriam proelii Laupensis e quo Bernenses cum sociis die 21 junii 1339 victore discessere, with the coat of arms of Erlach, Hic lapis positus est 1853.

The Habsburg force in the east could not reach Laupen in time for joining the battle and dispersed upon receiving news of the defeat. The victory of the Bernese/Swiss against all odds, outnumbered two-to-one by an army containing such a force of mounted chivalry, came as a surprise, and chroniclers record that comments like "God himself must have become a Bernese citizen" were heard among the retreating Habsburg troops.

Bern was drawn into closer association with the Swiss Confederacy, becoming one of the Eight Cantons in 1353.

The rivalry between Bern and Fribourg continued throughout the 14th century but did not erupt into military conflict again. Fribourg acquired substantial territories in the vicinity of Bern, but these were all lost again in the wake of the Battle of Sempach, with the 1389 peace treaty between Habsburg and the Swiss Confederacy. Fribourg renewed its alliance with Bern in 1403 and abandoned its expansionist policies, focusing on the acquisition of territories in its immediate neighbourhood. This permitted the rise of Bern as the most powerful city republic north of the alps by the early modern period, and paved the way for the accession of Fribourg as an associate of the Swiss Confederacy by 1454 and as a full member in 1481.

== Wider significance ==
Comparable to the Battle of Bannockburn 25 years earlier, Laupen was one of a string of battles presaging the definite decline of high medieval heavy cavalry (the classical "knights" of the 12th and 13th centuries) in the face of improving infantry tactics during the following century.

The battle is also the first occasion for which use of the Swiss cross as a badge to identify confederate troops is attested; it was shown on combatants' clothing as two stripes of textile. Diebold Schilling the Elder in the 1480s makes a point of showing this field sign as worn by troops of the Forest Cantons as a white cross in a red field, while it is not yet attached to the cantonal banners. In the same illustrations, the attacking Savoyard cavalry displays the white-on-red cross of Savoy both in its banner and on cavalry shields.

The battle has an important position in Swiss military history as the first victory in open battle of the Swiss Confederacy over Habsburg. The Swiss had already routed a Habsburg army in the Battle of Morgarten in 1315, but this had been an ambush on a marching army and not an open field battle. The drawn-out conflict with Habsburg was one of the main driving forces of the foundation and growth of the Confederacy, lasting for full two centuries, from the death of Habsburg king Rudolf I of Germany in 1291 until the peace treaty of 1511 in the aftermath of the Swabian War. It was the continued conflict with Albert II of Habsburg that prompted the accession of Zürich, Glarus, Zug and Bern to the confederacy, forming the Eight Cantons. After a brief Habsburg-Confederate alliance against an external threat in the so-called Gugler war of 1375, the conflict re-emerged in the 1380s, culminating in the Habsburg defeat in the Battle of Sempach in 1386.

== See also ==
- Battles of the Old Swiss Confederacy

== Sources ==
- De Vries, Kelly (1996). Infantry Warfare in the Early Fourteenth Century. Woodbridge: Boydell Press. pp. 129–136. ISBN 0-85115-567-7.
- Oman, Charles (1991) [1924]. A History of the Art of War in the Middle Ages Vol.2. London: Greenhill. pp. 241–5. ISBN 1-85367-105-3.
- Delbrück, Hans (1990) [1923]. History of the Art of War Vol III : The Middle Ages. trans. W.J. Renfroe. University of Nebraska Press. ISBN 978-0-8032-6585-1.
- Carey, Brian Todd; Alfree, Joshua B.; Cairns, John (2006). Warfare in the Medieval World (PDF). Pen & Sword Military. pp. 184–8. ISBN 978-1-84415-339-8. Archived from the original (PDF) on 22 June 2010.
- Heath, Ian (1982). Armies of the Middle Ages, volume 1: The Hundred Years' War, the Wars of the Roses and the Burgundian Wars, 1300-1487. Wargames Research Group. pp. 58–9.
