= Rudolf von Erlach (1299–1360) =

Bernese knight and army commander

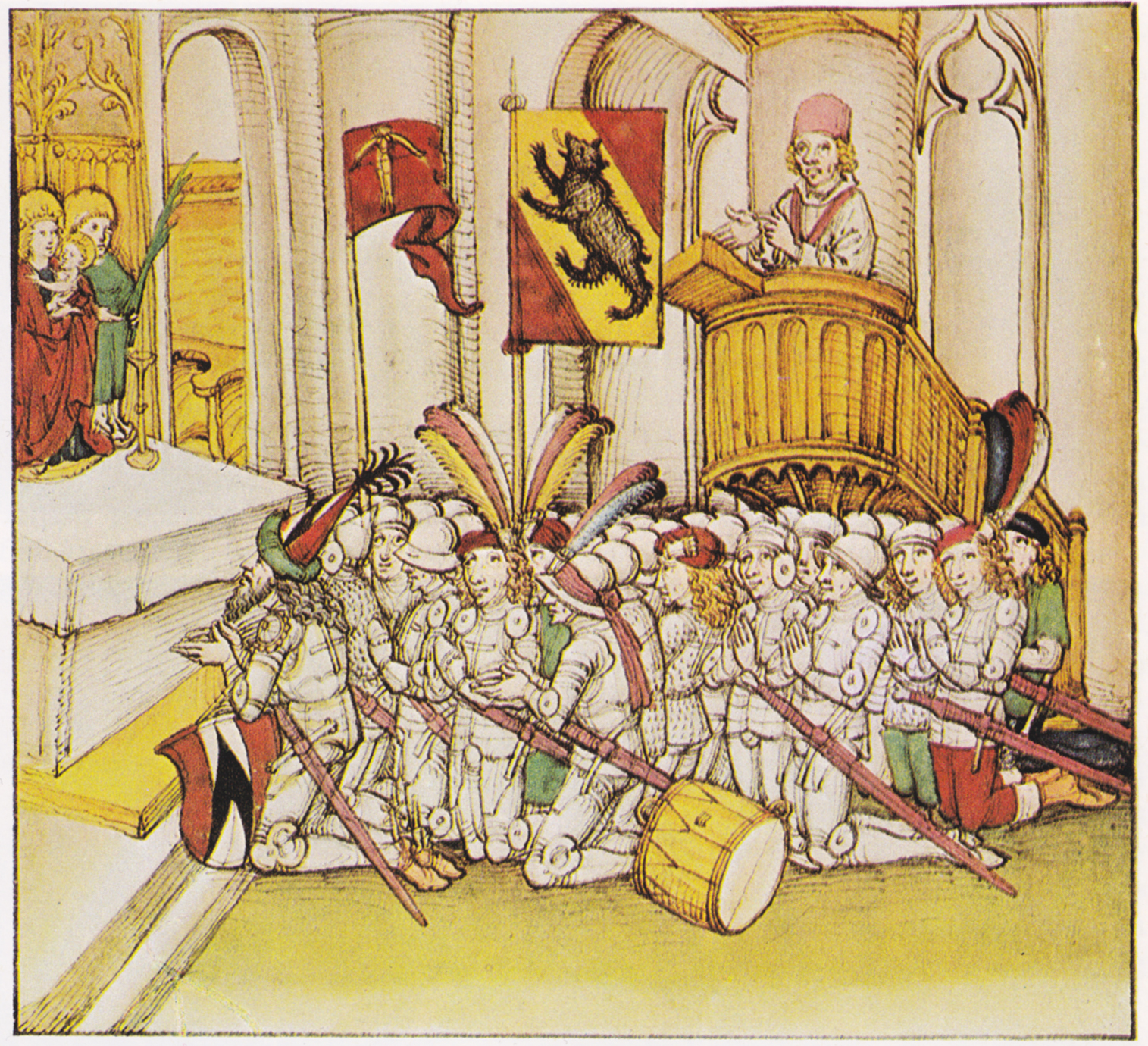
Rudolf von Erlach as field commander of Berne kneeling in prayer before the battle of Laupen 1339 (illustration from Spiezer Chronik, c. 1485). Rudolf is shown with his family coat or arms and wearing a pointed hat with his heraldic colours.

Rudolf von Erlach (born around 1299 in Bern, died in 1360 in Reichenbach Castle) was a knight and commander of the Swiss Confederation forces at the Battle of Laupen.

He was the son of Ulrich, a knight and steward, and Mechtilde of Rheinfelden. The von Erlach family had been Bernese citizens since the late 13th century. In 1316, Rudolf married Elisabeth Rych, the daughter of Ulrich of Solothurn. He was a squire, knight, and ministerialis (or unfree knight) in the service of Count Rudolf III of Nidau. He was the castellan in Erlach and owner of Reichenbach castle. He served as the guardian of the young Count of Nidau. According to Konrad Justinger, he led the Confederation armies in the Battle of Laupen in 1339. The Confederation victory against Freiburg army and feudal landholders from the County of Burgundy and the Habsburgs. His victory led to Bern and Freiburg avoiding further warfare. Bern was drawn into closer association with the Swiss Confederation, becoming one of the Eight Cantons in 1353. Freiburg itself would become an associate of the Confederation in 1454 and a full member in 1481. He was killed in 1360 by his son-in-law Jost of Rudenz of Unterwalden. They had argued with each other on the subject of a dowry, when Jost saw the sword from the Battle of Laupen hanging against wall. In sudden anger he seized it and plunged it the heart of Rudolf. He then fled, pursued by his father in law's hounds and was never seen again.

Family
Mother	Mechthild Von Rheinfelden
Father	Urlich Von Erlach
Spouse	Elisabeth Rych
Children	Urlich Von Erlach Claire Von Erlach
Religion	Protestant
