= Hirschaid =

- Municipality
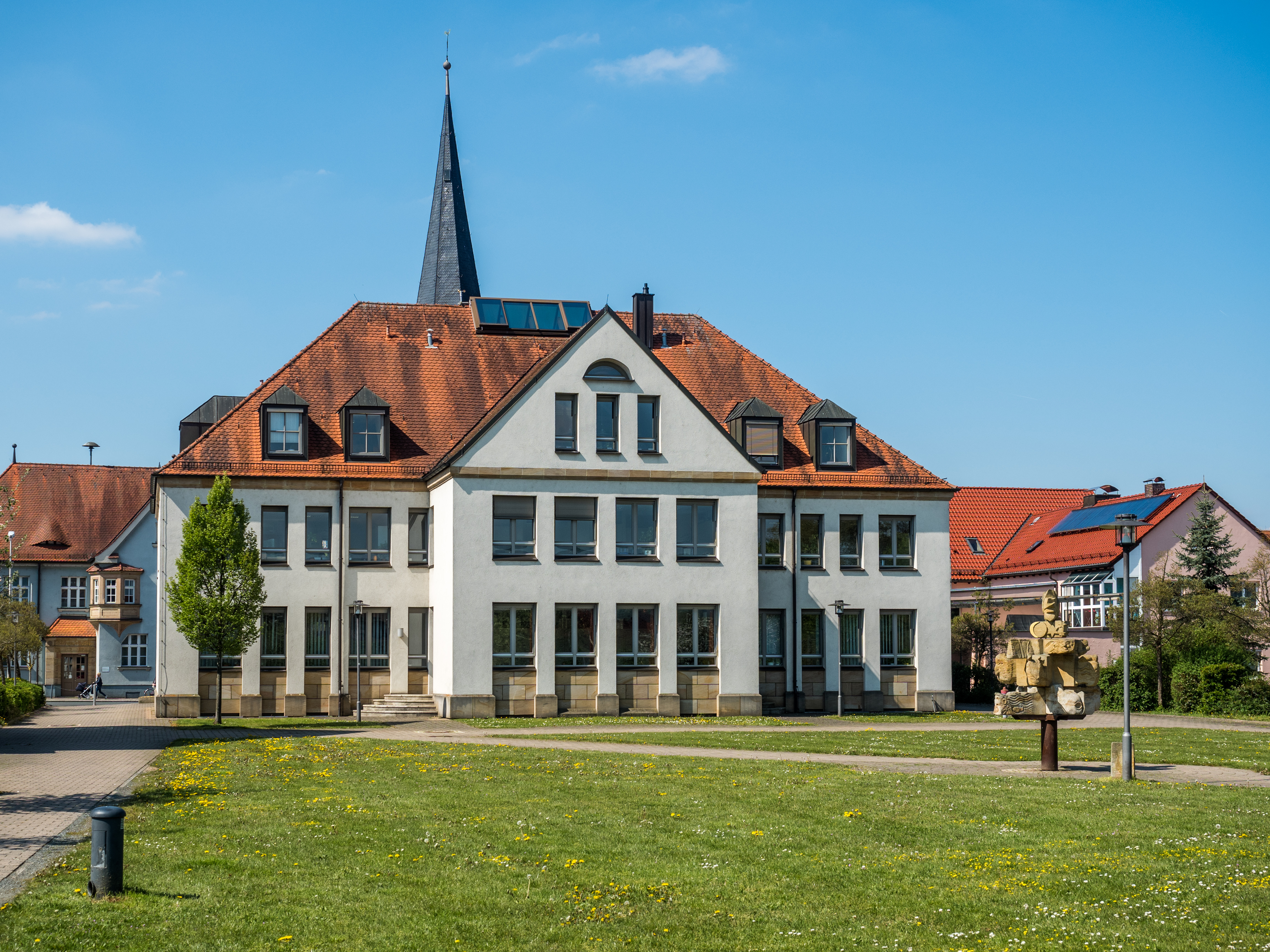
- Town hall

- Coat of arms

- Location of Hirschaid within Bamberg district
- Interactive map of Hirschaid
- Location within Germany Location within Bavaria
- Coordinates: 49°49′N 10°59′E
- Country: Germany
- State: Bavaria
- Admin. region: Oberfranken
- District: Bamberg
- Subdivisions: 10 Gemeindeteile

Government
  - Mayor (2020–26): Klaus Homann (CSU)

Area
  - Total: 40.95 km^{2} (15.81 sq mi)
- Elevation: 248 m (814 ft)

Population (2025-12-31)
  - Total: 12,425
  - Density: 303.4/km^{2} (785.9/sq mi)
- Time zone: UTC+01:00 (CET)
  - Summer (DST): UTC+02:00 (CEST)
- Postal codes: 96114
- Dialling codes: 09543
- Vehicle registration: BA
- Website: www.hirschaid.de

Hirschaid is a German market town in the Upper Franconian district of Bamberg and lies roughly twelve kilometres south of Bamberg on the Regnitz and the Main-Danube Canal.

== Geography ==
=== Location ===
The community's main centre lies south-southeast of Bamberg where the Reiche Ebrach empties into the Regnitz.

For various reasons, among them the community's favourable location on the A 73 and its close proximity to Bamberg (12 km), Forchheim (13 km), Erlangen (about 30 km), Fürth (about 40 km) and Nuremberg (about 50 km), Hirschaid has grown markedly since the 1960s.

=== Constituent communities ===
Hirschaid's main and namesake centre is by far the biggest of its Gemeindeteile with a population of 6,465. The community furthermore has these outlying centres, each given here with its own population figure (as of 31.12.2024):

- Erlach 441
- Friesen 361
- Großbuchfeld 105
- Juliushof 509
- Kleinbuchfeld 125
- Köttmannsdorf next to Hirschaid 632
- Röbersdorf 808
- Rothensand 327
- Sassanfahrt 2,163
- Seigendorf 812

Ironically, Großbuchfeld (“Great Beech Field”) is actually smaller than Kleinbuchfeld (“Little Beech Field”).

== History ==
The community's name goes back to the von Hirzheide noble family whose coat of arms were charged with a hart, still seen in the community's arms today.

Hirschaid lies not far from the former via regia, an ancient road that since antiquity joined the north in the area around Lüneburg with the south all the way to Lower Austria. The name Hirschaid refers to the former landscape and wildlife (Hirsch is “hart” in German).

Finds dug up on the Regnitz Valley terraces bear witness to an early settlement beginning no later than the New Stone Age. Bearing witness to the later La Tène culture (Celtic) are above all the finds and wall remains on the nearby Friesener Warte

In 1079, Hirschaid became historical for the first time through a document issued by King Heinrich IV. In 1979, this date was duly celebrated in the community's 900th anniversary celebration. From 1300, it was the seat of the Lords, ministeriales and Vögte (sing. Vogt – reeve) of Hirzheide. Their Frankish line died out in 1590, although a Swedish-Livonian line still lives today. The coat of arms that they bore then, showing a golden hart in silver climbing out of a blue three-knolled hill (a charge called a Dreiberg in German heraldry), foreshadowed the one now borne by the community.

Although Hirschaid was mostly spared in the German Peasants' War, the community, lying on the main through road, was hard hit in the Thirty Years' War. A chronicler reports from this time: “After Candlemas 1633 the Swedes also came here and dwelt in the Swedish way. They plundered and robbed whatever they could get; nothing was holy to them. The House of God had its windows and doors beaten in, the inside was demolished, the bells taken away and broken up...”

Further plunderings had to be suffered in the Seven Years' War and especially in the Napoleonic Wars, when on 6 August 1793 a heavy cavalry and artillery battle broke out right near the community between the Imperial Army and French troops.

With Secularization, Hirschaid, which had been assigned to the tithing area of Eggolsheim, passed along with its 105 “autonomous houses” to Bavaria.

The building of the Ludwig Danube-Main Canal in 1834 and the opening of the Nuremberg-Bamberg railway line in 1844 yielded the first industrial incentives for Hirschaid. Basket weaving, which was introduced about this time, offered others work and a livelihood. About 1900, the population had grown to roughly 1,120, and the number of houses to 173.

Because of its favourable location, determined by the railway station on the Nuremberg-Bamberg railway line and the community's lying right near the highways, but also by administrative reform in 1972, the market community of Hirschaid with its constituent communities has grown to have more than 11,000 inhabitants and is developing itself appreciably into a small transport and economic centre.

=== Religion ===
- Roman Catholic: 80%
- Evangelical Lutheran: 10%
- Other, no religion: 10%

All figures are rough.

== Politics ==
=== Community council ===
The community council is made up of 24 members, listed here by party or voter community affiliation, and also with the number of seats that each holds according to the 2020 local elections :

- CSU 8
- Grüne/Ökologische Liste Hirschaid (ÖLH) 3
- Freie Wähler 3
- Wählergemeinschaft West (WGW)/(WGSKR) 2
- Wählergemeinschaft Regnitzau (WGR) 2
- Freie Wählergemeinschaft Röbersdorf (FWG Röb) 2
- Wählergemeinschaft Regnitzau 2
- SPD 2
- BürgerNahe Liste Hirschaid (BNL) 1
- FDP 1

=== Coat of arms ===
Hirschaid's arms might heraldically be described thus: In argent a mullet of eight azure halved per fess emerging therefrom above a hart attired springing sable.

== Economy and infrastructure ==
=== Education ===
The community is served by Realschule Hirschaid.

=== Established businesses ===
- Schaeffler KG ball and roller bearings, engine components, linear transfer technology

=== Sport and leisure ===
The Frankenlagune swimming pool, opened in May 2000 has an 82 m^{2} indoor basin with whirlpool, a 66 m^{2} heated outdoor basin and a 38 m^{2} mother-child basin.

== Town partnerships ==
On 11 September 1999, the partnership with the community of Ivančna Gorica, Slovenia, about 30 km southeast of the capital Ljubljana, was founded.

== Famous people ==
=== Honorary citizens ===
- Alfred E. Hierold, Catholic theologian and canonist
