= Jegenstorf =

- Municipality
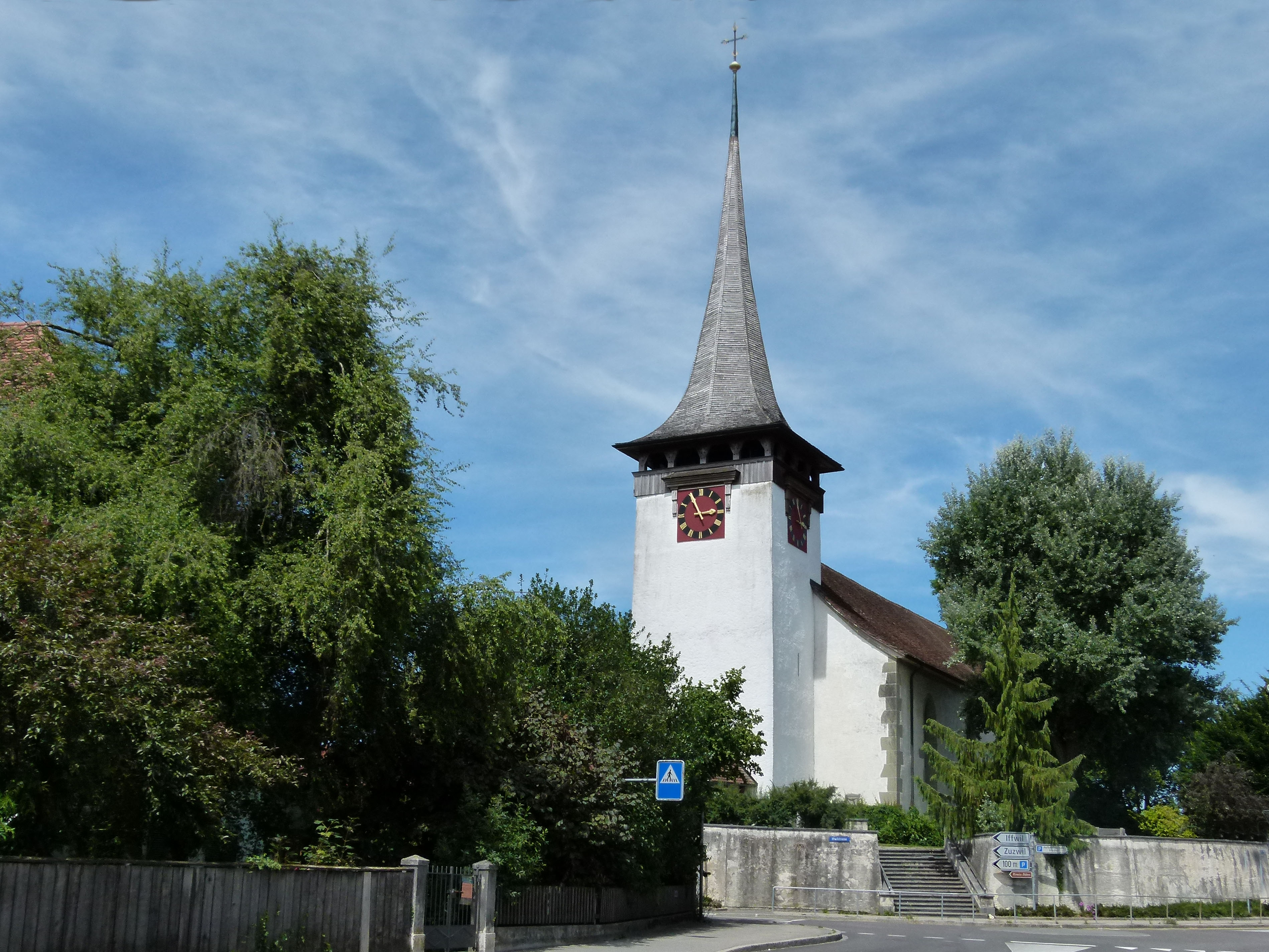

- Flag Coat of arms
- Location of Jegenstorf
- Location within Switzerland Location within Canton of Bern
- Coordinates: 47°3′N 7°30′E
- Country: Switzerland
- Canton: Bern
- District: Bern-Mittelland

Government
  - Executive: Gemeinderat with 7 members
  - Mayor: Gemeindepräsident; Sandra Lyoth SPS/PSS (as of 2026)

Area
  - Total: 8.9 km^{2} (3.4 sq mi)
- Elevation: 521 m (1,709 ft)

Population (December 2020)
  - Total: 5,738
  - Density: 640/km^{2} (1,700/sq mi)
- Time zone: UTC+01:00 (CET)
  - Summer (DST): UTC+02:00 (CEST)
- Postal code: 3303
- SFOS number: 540
- ISO 3166 code: CH-BE
- Surrounded by: Grafenried, Iffwil, Mattstetten, Münchringen, Urtenen-Schönbühl, Zauggenried, Zuzwil
- Website: www.jegenstorf.ch

Jegenstorf is a municipality in the Bern-Mittelland administrative district in the canton of Bern in Switzerland. On 1 January 2010 the former municipality of Ballmoos merged into Jegenstorf and on 1 January 2014 Münchringen and Scheunen merged into Jegenstorf.

== History ==
Aerial view from 300 m by Walter Mittelholzer (1925)

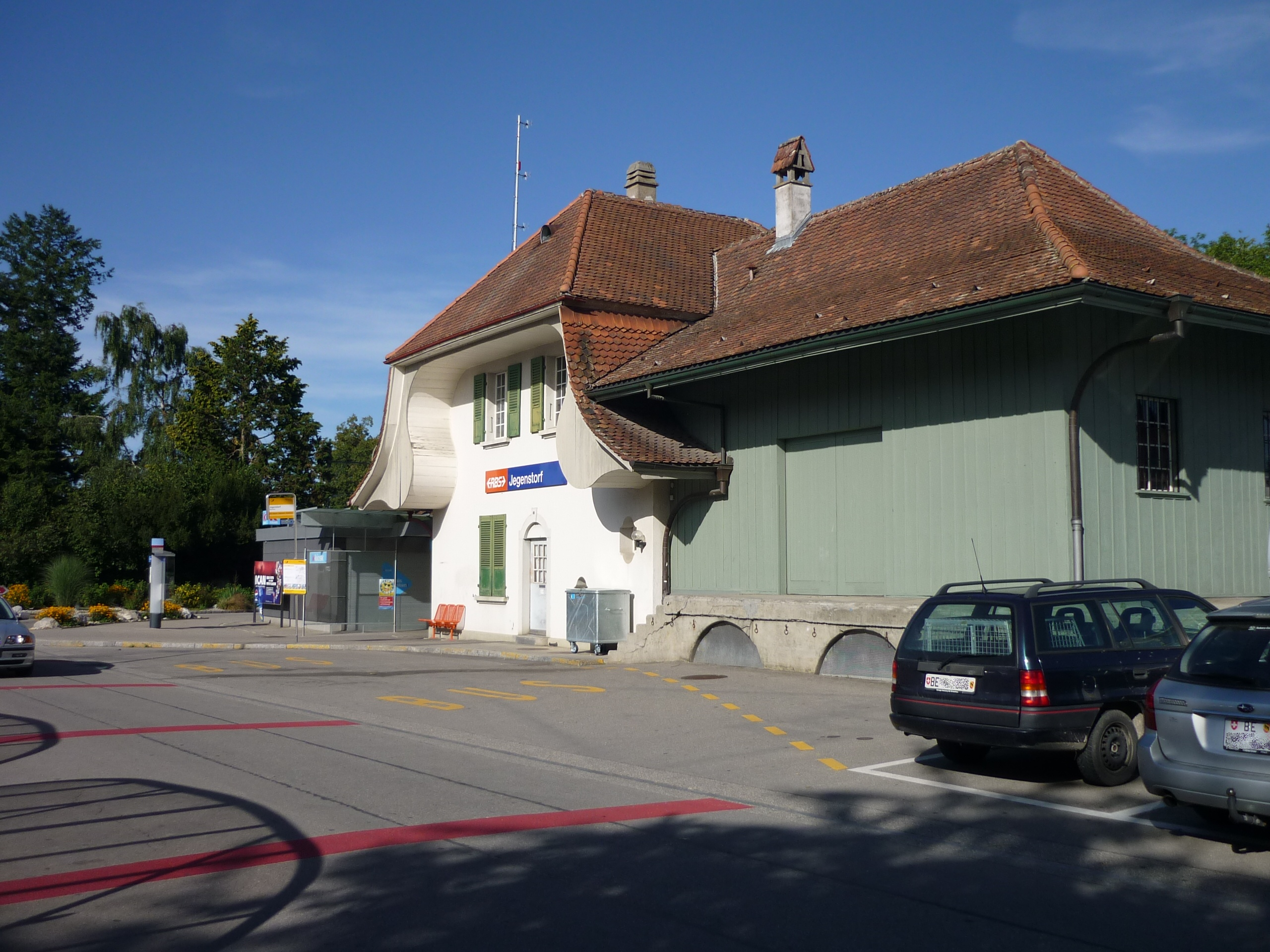
Jegenstorf rail station

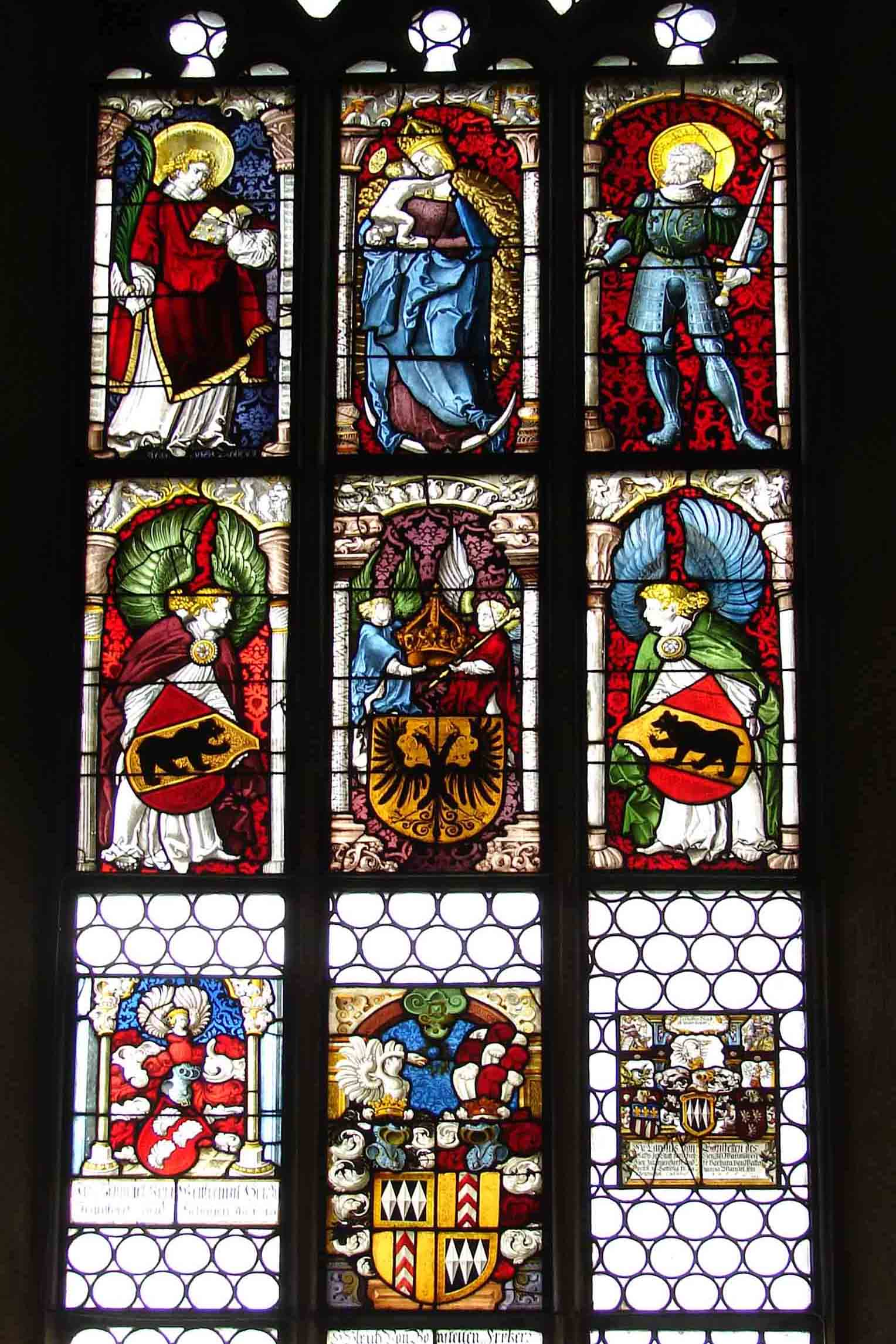
Stained glass in the church in Jegenstorf

Jegenstorf is first mentioned in 1131 as Igistorf. In 1255 it was mentioned as Jegistorf.

The earliest trace of human settlements in the area are several Hallstatt burial mounds which were found on the border with Münchringen. The mounds contain a rich collection of arrowheads, pottery and gold artifacts. The remains of a Gallo-Roman estate, including a wall, parts of pillars, bricks and ceramics, have been discovered near the village church.

During the Middle Ages the village was held by the Zähringen Ministerialis (unfree knights in the service of a feudal overlord) family of Jegenstorf. The Jegenstorfs built a moated castle near the village in the 12th century. When the Zähringens died out, the village became part of the Kyburg court of Zollikofen. A low court was held in front of the Gasthof Kreuz in Jegenstorf. In 1406 Bern acquired many of the Kyburg villages including Jegenstorf. Under Bernese rule, the court continued to be held in front of the Gasthof or Inn.

At some time before 1300, a portion of the Jegenstorf lands were acquired by the Erlach family. In 1300, the Jegenstorf family died out and the remainder of the village passed into other nobles' possession. The Erlachs continued to gain power and in the 15th century acquired the castle, the entire village and the courts. The castle remained under Erlach control until 1584. The Bonstetten family owned it 1584-1675, followed by the Wattenwyl between 1675-1720 and again the Erlach family in 1720-58. Karl Ludwig von Erlach sold the castle and estate in 1758, but kept the right to rule over the village. They held the rulership over the village until the 1798 French invasion when it transferred to the Canton of Bern. In 1810 the Canton compensated the Erlachs for the village.

During the Swiss peasant war of 1653, the residents of Jegenstorfer attacked and plundered the castle. In retaliation, a Bernese army burned the village.

In 1720 Albrecht Friedrich von Erlach had the castle rebuilt into a baroque country house. He demolished the fortifications and replaced them with parks and gardens. After they sold the castle in 1758, it was a summer residence for the patrician Stürler family for almost two centuries. The Stürlers sold the castle in 1934 and two years later the Society for the Preservation of Jegenstorf Castle (Verein zur Erhaltung des Schlosses Jegenstorf) converted it into the Museum for Bernese Home Decor. In 1955, management of the castle passed to the Jegenstorf Castle Foundation (Stiftung Schloss Jegenstorf).

A local priest for the village church was first mentioned in 1180. The Jegenstorf family had patronage rights for the church. After the family died out, several Bernese patrician families had the patronage right. In 1424 the Niedere Spital (Lower Hospital) took the church over. The current building was built in 1514-15 and the stained glass is from the 16th and 17th century. In 1528 Jegenstorf accepted the Protestant Reformation along with most of the Canton of Bern. The parish of Jegenstorf was much larger than the political municipality. It included the municipalities of Ballmoos, Iffwil, Jegenstorf, Münchringen, Oberscheunen, Zauggenried, Zuzwil, Mattstetten and Urtenen-Schönbühl.

In Jegenstorf during the Early Modern era, as in many other Swiss villages, a minority of large landowners held all the power. In 1802 about 18% of the population were large landowners, but they controlled virtually all leadership positions in the village. The small farmers, about 9%, and the Tauner or disenfranchised common laborers, 73% of the population, had no voice in government. This began to change with the privatization of common lands and forests in 1825 and the Regeneration period which began in 1830. Throughout the 19th and early 20th century the village remained generally rural and agricultural. While Jegenstorf was located on the old Bern-Solothurn road, the new railroads and highways bypassed the municipality. A local narrow gauge railway was built to the village in 1916, but it remained under utilized until the 1960s when the growth of the agglomeration of Bern made Jegenstorf attractive to commuters. In 1970 the Interdiscount group built a facility in the municipality. It grew into the largest employer in Jegenstorf. With the growing population, new schools and neighborhoods were built. Jegenstorf's secondary school opened in 1879. The municipal hospital opened in 1891. It was rebuilt in 1976 and expanded in 1990, but closed in 1999.

=== Münchringen ===
Münchringen is first mentioned around 1261-63 as Munderchingen. The Holzmühle settlement was first mentioned in 1271.

The oldest trace of a settlement in the area is a cluster of Hallstatt era grave mounds at Hursch and Waldäcker. By the 13th century Münchringen and Holzmühle were both owned by the Counts of Kyburg and were part of the Kyburg low court in Alchenflüh. After the extinction of the Kyburg line, the villages came under Bern's control. In 1518 the villages successfully requested that they would henceforth be administered from Kernenried. Following the Act of Mediation, Münchringen became part of the Fraubrunnen district. In 1844-45, the formerly independent hamlet of Holzmühle became part of the political municipality of Münchringen. However, Holzmühle remained part of the parish of Jegenstorf.

In 1944-46, levees and canals helped control the Urtenen river and prevent periodic flooding. The completion of a highway on the municipal border in 1965 encouraged population and industrial growth in Münchringen. The formerly agricultural village is now commuter town with almost four fifths of the working population traveling to the region around Bern for work.

=== Scheunen ===
Scheunen is first mentioned in 1226 as Schunon.

The oldest trace of a settlement in the area are Hallstatt era grave mounds at Steinholz and Junkholz. During the Early Middle Ages the grave mounds were used as a cemetery again. The settlements that today make up Scheunen were originally the two independent villages of Oberscheunen and Jegenstorf-Scheunen. They were part of the parishes of Jegenstorf and Messen-Scheunen. After 1530 they both joined the new Reformed parish of Messen in the Canton of Solothurn. They two villages formed a school district in 1795. However, they both remained politically independent until they were merged by decree in 1911. Starting in 2007, the municipal clerk in Iffwil assumed responsibility for Scheunen.

They were both originally part of the Kyburg low court of Jegenstorf. After the extinction of the Kyburg family in 1406, Bern acquired the villages and placed them under the court at Zollikofen. After the 1803 Act of Mediation they became part of the district of Fraubrunnen.

== Geography ==
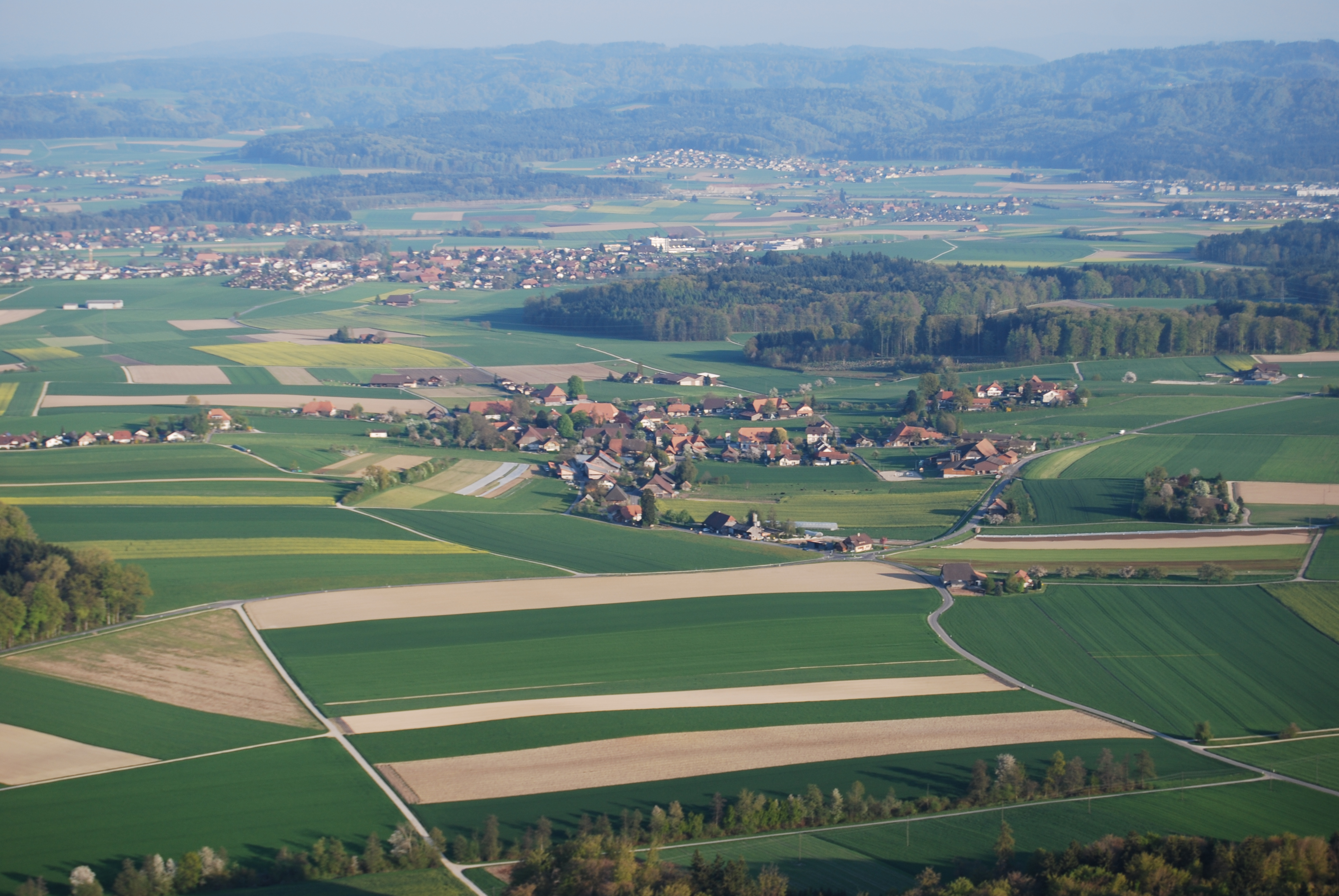
Iffwil, Jegenstorf and surrounding fields

Jegenstorf has an area, (as of the 2004/09 survey) of 13.49 km^{2} (5.21 sq mi). Of this area, about 63.5% is used for agricultural purposes, while 23.5% is forested. Of the rest of the land, 12.0% is settled (buildings or roads) and 1.0% is unproductive land. In the 2013/18 survey a total of 115 ha (280 acres) or about 8.5% of the total area was covered with buildings, an increase of 35 ha (86 acres) over the 1982 amount. Over the same time period, the amount of recreational space in the municipality increased by 7 ha (17 acres) and is now about 0.96% of the total area.

Of the agricultural land, 7 ha (17 acres) is used for orchards and vineyards and 840 ha (2,100 acres) is fields and grasslands. Since 1982 the amount of agricultural land has decreased by 44 ha (110 acres). Rivers and lakes cover 14 ha (35 acres) in the municipality.

Jegenstorf is located on the Rapperswil Plateau and includes the village of Jegenstorf and multiple new neighborhoods including; Bachtelen, Bimer, Solecht and Risere.

== Coat of arms ==
The blazon of the municipal coat of arms is Per pale first per chevron dancety Argent and Gules and second per angeled fess Gules and Argent.

== Demographics ==
Jegenstorf has a population (as of 31 December 2020) of 5,738. As of 2014, 10.0% of the population are resident foreign nationals. Over the last 4 years (2010-2014) the population has changed at a rate of 6.25%. The birth rate in the municipality, in 2014, was 10.5, while the death rate was 6.8 per thousand residents.

Most of the population (as of 2000) speaks German (3,741 or 93.5%) as their first language, French is the second most common (45 or 1.1%) and Albanian is the third (43 or 1.1%). There are 38 people who speak Italian.

As of 2014, children and teenagers (0–19 years old) make up 20.7% of the population, while adults (20–64 years old) are 56.3% of the population and seniors (over 64 years old) make up 22.9%. In 2015 there were 2,191 single residents, 2,733 people who were married or in a civil partnership, 274 widows or widowers and 411 divorced residents.

In 2014 there were 2,511 private households in Jegenstorf with an average household size of 2.23 persons. In 2015 about 63.4% of all buildings in the municipality were single family homes, which is greater than the percentage in the canton (48.4%) and greater than the percentage nationally (57.4%). Of the 858 inhabited buildings in the municipality, in 2000, about 62.4% were single family homes and 22.6% were multiple family buildings. Additionally, about 12.2% of the buildings were built before 1919, while 12.6% were built between 1991 and 2000. In 2013 the rate of construction of new housing units per 1000 residents was 8.74. The vacancy rate for the municipality, in 2015, was 5.36%.

== Historic population ==
The historical population is given in the following chart:

== Heritage sites of national significance ==
The Swiss Reformed church at Solothurnstrasse 1 and Jegenstorf Castle are listed as Swiss heritage site of national significance.

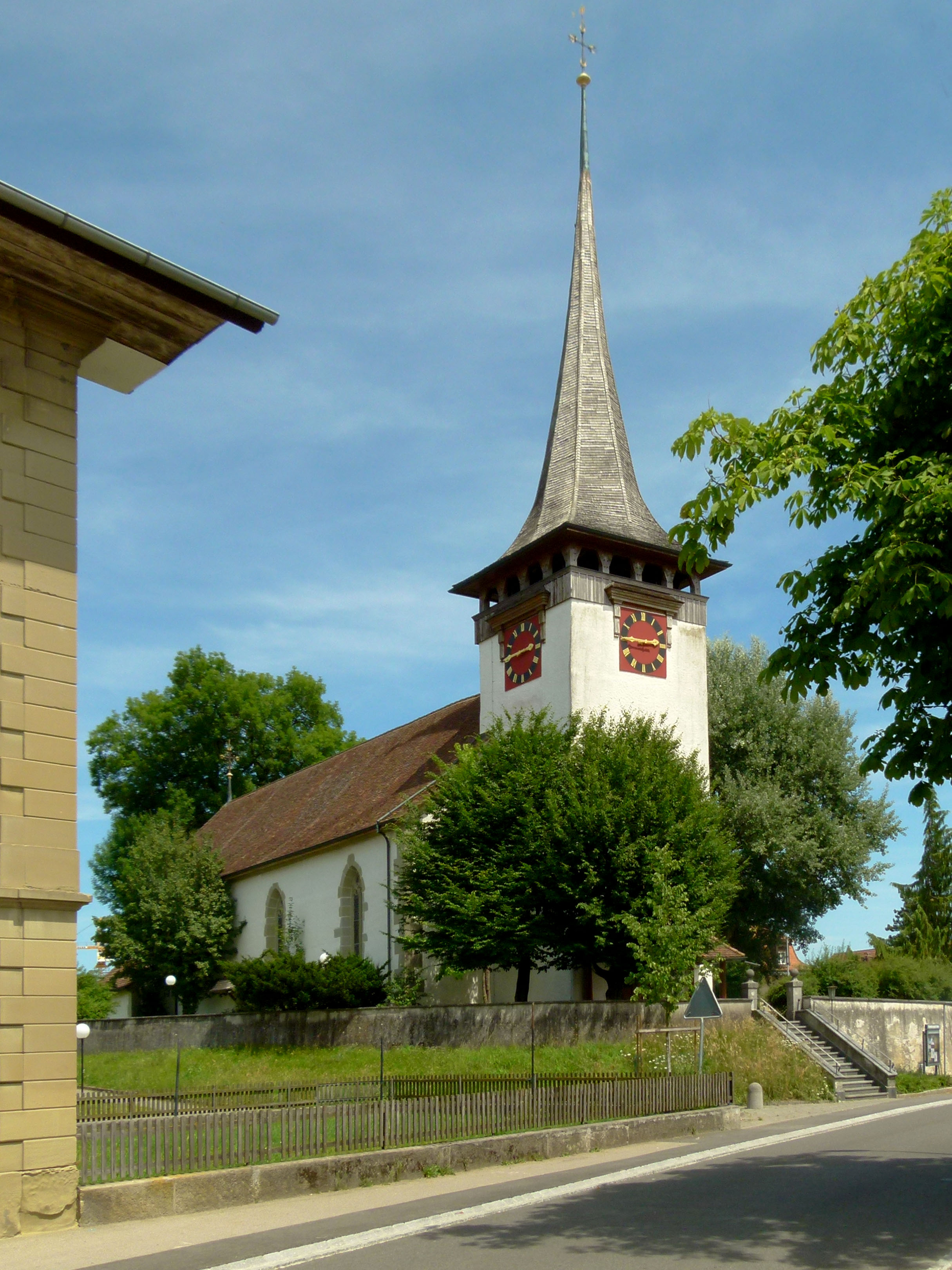
Swiss Reformed church

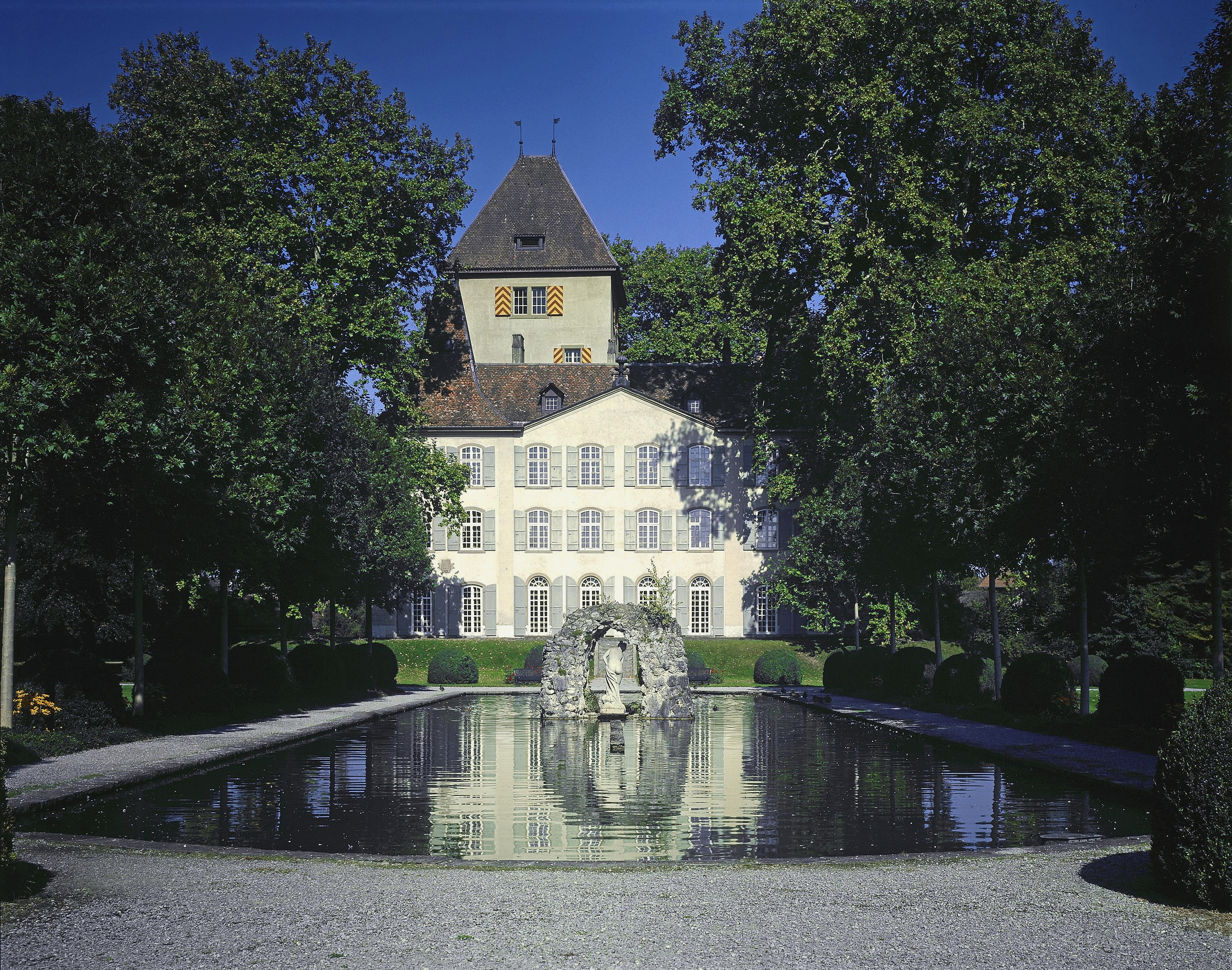
Jegenstorf Castle

== Politics ==
In the 2015 federal election the most popular party was the SVP with 26.2% of the vote. The next three most popular parties were the SP (18.6%), the BDP (17.2%) and the FDP (11.3%). In the federal election, a total of 2,233 votes were cast, and the voter turnout was 53.4%.

In the 2011 federal election the most popular party was the Swiss People's Party (SVP) which received 22.8% of the vote. The next three most popular parties were the Conservative Democratic Party (BDP) (19.5%), the Social Democratic Party (SP) (18.8%) and the FDP.The Liberals (10.4%). In the federal election, a total of 2,041 votes were cast, and the voter turnout was 57.2%.

== Economy ==
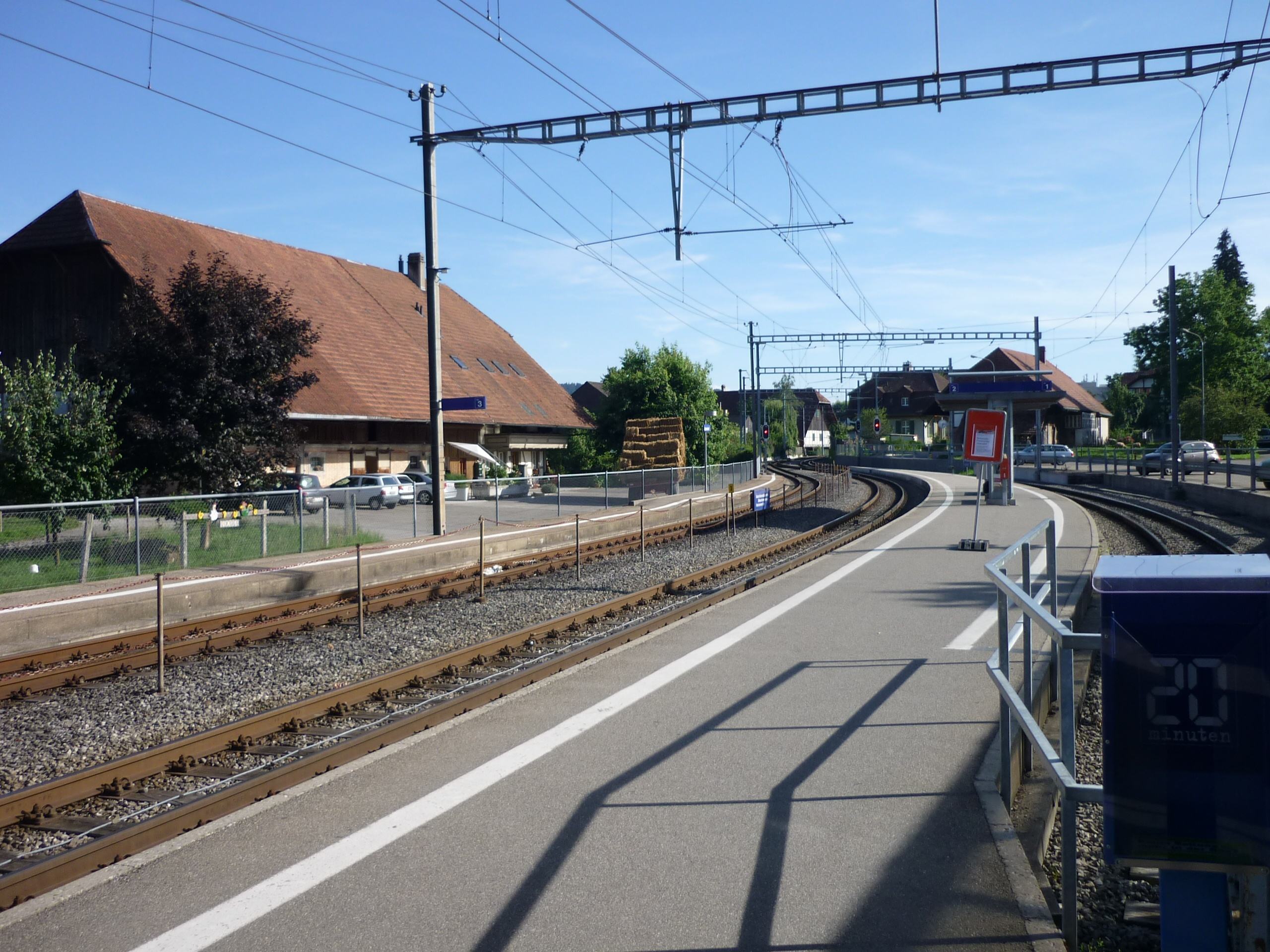
Jegenstorf rail station

Jegenstorf is classed as a periurbane community in a metropolitan region. The municipality is part of the agglomeration of Bern.

As of 2016, there were a total of 2,140 people employed in the municipality. Of these, a total of 98 people worked in 33 businesses in the primary economic sector. The secondary sector employed 282 workers in 44 separate businesses. Finally, the tertiary sector provided 1,760 jobs in 250 businesses, of which 840 people worked in businesses with more than 50 employees.

In 2014 a total of 8.7% of the population received social assistance. In 2011 the unemployment rate in the municipality was 1.9%.

In 2015 the average cantonal, municipal and church tax rate in the municipality for a couple with two children making SFr 80,000 was 6.6% while the rate for a single person making SFr 150,000 was 17.7%. The canton has a slightly higher than average tax rate for those making SFr 80,000 and a slightly higher than average rate for those making SFr 150,000. In 2013 the average income in the municipality per tax payer was SFr 81,871 and the per person average was SFr 36,157, which is greater than the cantonal averages of SFr 72,796 and SFr 31,504 respectively In contrast, the national tax payer average is SFr 82,682, while the per person average is SFr 35,825.

In 2000, there were 1,091 workers who commuted into the municipality and 1,658 workers who commuted away. The municipality is a net exporter of workers, with about 1.5 workers leaving the municipality for every one entering.

== Religion ==
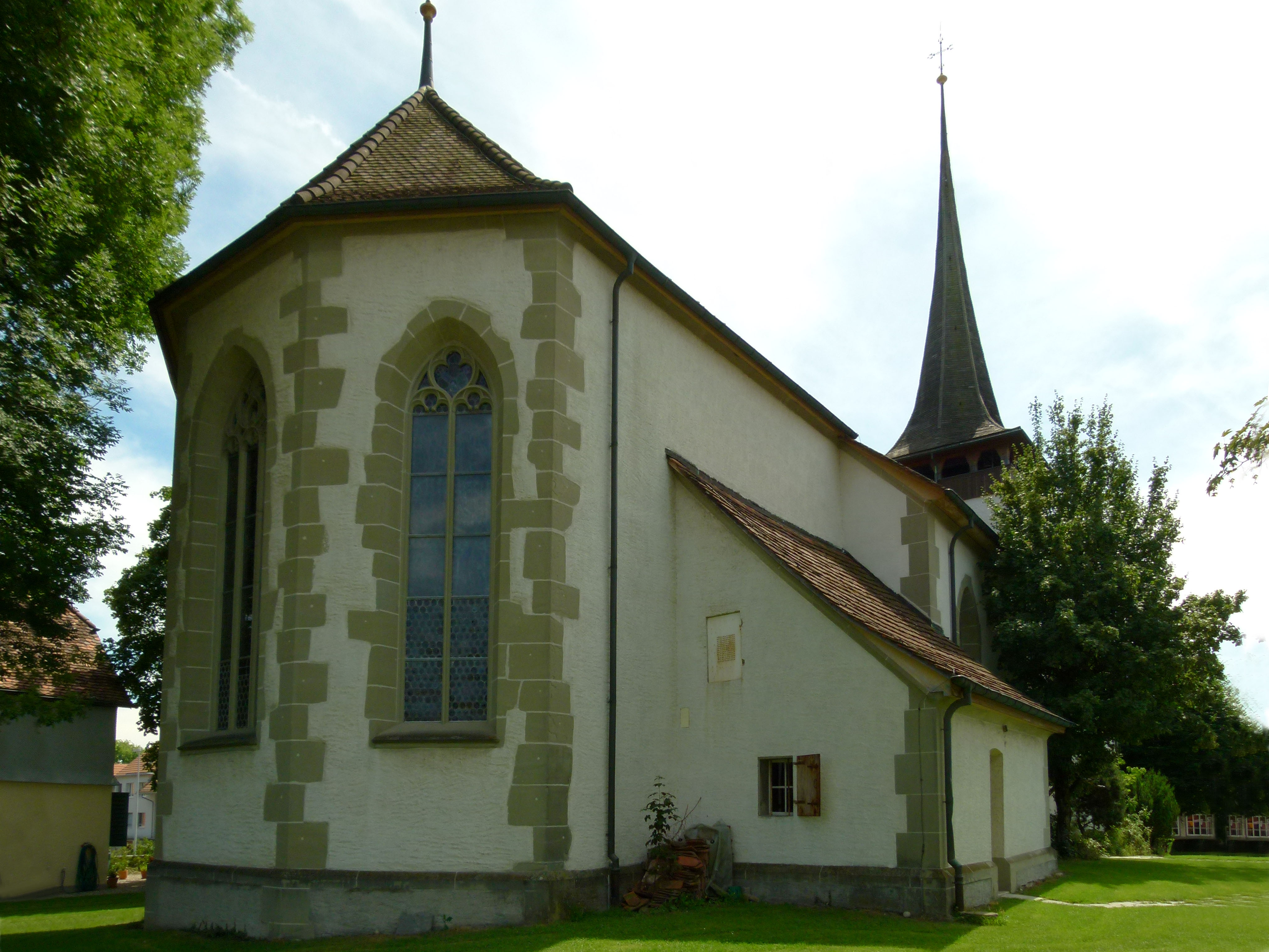
Reformed church in Jegenstorf

From the 2000 census, 537 or 13.4% were Roman Catholic, while 2,775 or 69.4% belonged to the Swiss Reformed Church. Of the rest of the population, there were 56 members of an Orthodox church (or about 1.40% of the population), there were 3 individuals (or about 0.08% of the population) who belonged to the Christian Catholic Church, and there were 239 individuals (or about 5.98% of the population) who belonged to another Christian church. There were 2 individuals (or about 0.05% of the population) who were Jewish, and 82 (or about 2.05% of the population) who were Islamic. There were 8 individuals who were Buddhist, 15 individuals who were Hindu and 3 individuals who belonged to another church. 287 (or about 7.18% of the population) belonged to no church, are agnostic or atheist, and 109 individuals (or about 2.73% of the population) did not answer the question.

== Education ==
In Jegenstorf about 1,701 or (42.5%) of the population have completed non-mandatory upper secondary education, and 600 or (15.0%) have completed additional higher education (either university or a Fachhochschule). Of the 600 who completed tertiary schooling, 73.7% were Swiss men, 22.3% were Swiss women, 2.2% were non-Swiss men and 1.8% were non-Swiss women.

The Canton of Bern school system provides one year of non-obligatory Kindergarten, followed by six years of Primary school. This is followed by three years of obligatory lower Secondary school where the students are separated according to ability and aptitude. Following the lower Secondary students may attend additional schooling or they may enter an apprenticeship.

During the 2010-11 school year, there were a total of 585 students attending classes in Jegenstorf. There were 4 kindergarten classes with a total of 82 students in the municipality. Of the kindergarten students, 13.4% were permanent or temporary residents of Switzerland (not citizens) and 20.7% have a different mother language than the classroom language. The municipality had 17 primary classes and 329 students. Of the primary students, 11.6% were permanent or temporary residents of Switzerland (not citizens) and 16.4% have a different mother language than the classroom language. During the same year, there were 9 lower secondary classes with a total of 174 students. There were 7.5% who were permanent or temporary residents of Switzerland (not citizens) and 6.9% have a different mother language than the classroom language.

As of 2000, there were 106 students in Jegenstorf who came from another municipality, while 140 residents attended schools outside the municipality.

Jegenstorf is home to the Gemeindebibliothek Jegenstorf (municipal library of Jegenstorf). The library has (as of 2008) 12,366 books or other media, and loaned out 38,136 items in the same year. It was open a total of 282 days with average of 14 hours per week during that year.
