= Bäriswil =

Bäriswil is the name of two places in Switzerland:

- Bäriswil, Bern, in the Canton of Bern
- Bäriswil, Solothurn, in the Canton of Solothurn
