= Mattstetten =

- Municipality
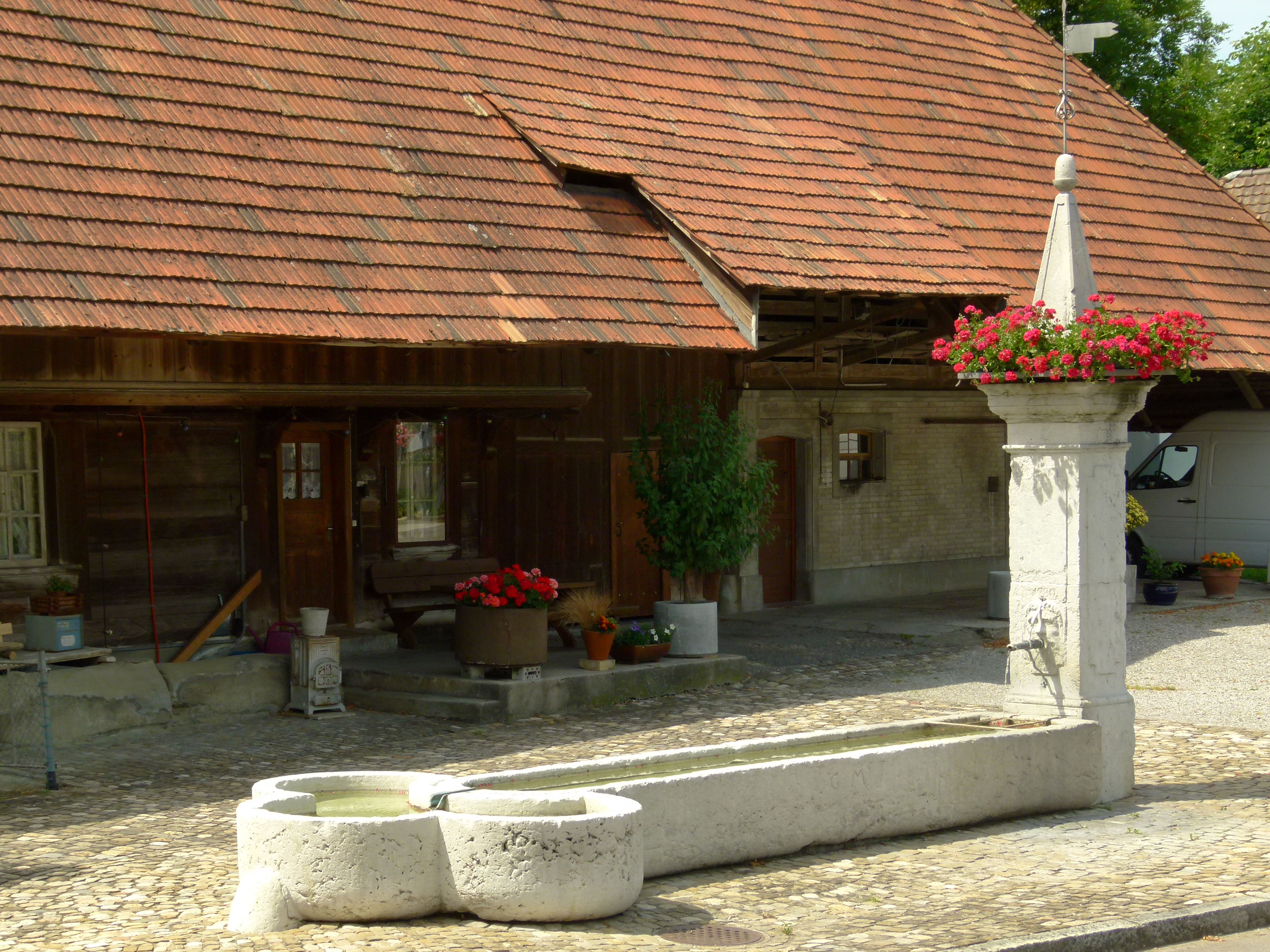
- Mattstetten village fountain

- Flag Coat of arms
- Location of Mattstetten
- Location within Switzerland Location within Canton of Bern
- Coordinates: 47°2′N 7°31′E
- Country: Switzerland
- Canton: Bern
- District: Bern-Mittelland

Government
  - Executive: Gemeinderat with 5 members
  - Mayor: Gemeindepräsident(in); Dominique-Bert Bösiger (as of 2026)

Area
  - Total: 3.8 km^{2} (1.5 sq mi)
- Elevation: 516 m (1,693 ft)

Population (December 2020)
  - Total: 580
  - Density: 150/km^{2} (400/sq mi)
- Time zone: UTC+01:00 (CET)
  - Summer (DST): UTC+02:00 (CEST)
- Postal code: 3322
- SFOS number: 543
- ISO 3166 code: CH-BE
- Surrounded by: Bäriswil, Bolligen, Hindelbank, Jegenstorf, Krauchthal, Münchringen, Urtenen-Schönbühl
- Website: www.mattstetten.ch

Mattstetten is a municipality in the Bern-Mittelland administrative district in the canton of Bern in Switzerland.

== History ==
Mattstetten is first mentioned in 1201 as Mahtsteten.

During the Middle Ages, Ministerialis (unfree knights in the service of a feudal overlord) family of Mattstetten built a tower in the village. The family held the village as a fief for the Dukes of Zähringen and then the Counts of Kyburg. In the 14th century the village and surrounding land was held by the Knightly family of Rohrmoos. In the 15th century it was combined with Urtenen and was held by several Bernese patrician families including; the Diesbachs, the Bonstettens, the Willadings and the Erlachs. The local low court was in Urtenen, while the high court was in Zollikofen.

In 1831 a village school was built. Previously students had attended school in Urtenen. The fields around the village were often flooded by the Urtenen river until the river channel was deepened (in 1780, 1855 and 1917) and levees were built in 1944–46. While the village remained generally rural and agrarian the population slowly grew. In 1965 the new neighborhoods of Schulhausbitz, Neumatt and Breite were built for the new residents. Today many of the residents commute to jobs in Bern.

== Geography ==
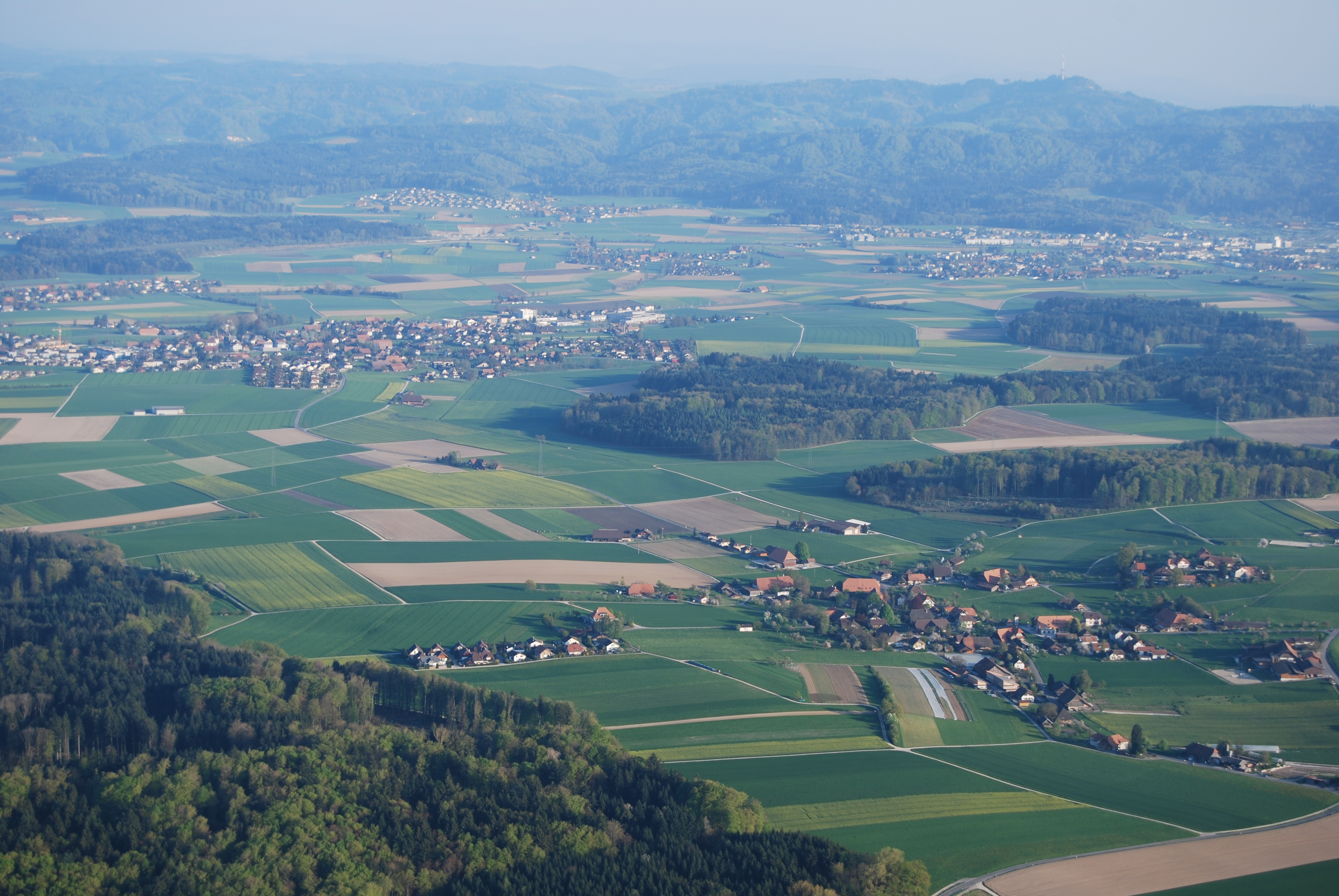
Aerial view of the area around Mattstetten. Mattstetten is in the center background.

Mattstetten has an area of 3.79 km^{2} (1.46 sq mi). Of this area, 1.89 km^{2} (0.73 mi^{2}) or 49.7% is used for agricultural purposes, while 1.28 km^{2} (0.49 mi^{2}) or 33.7% is forested. Of the rest of the land, 0.58 km^{2} (0.22 mi^{2}) or 15.3% is settled (buildings or roads), 0.04 km^{2} (9.9 acres) or 1.1% is either rivers or lakes.

Of the built up area, industrial buildings made up 1.6% of the total area while housing and buildings made up 5.0% and transportation infrastructure made up 7.4%. Power and water infrastructure as well as other special developed areas made up 1.3% of the area Out of the forested land, all of the forested land area is covered with heavy forests. Of the agricultural land, 44.2% is used for growing crops and 5.0% is pastures. All the water in the municipality is flowing water.

The village is located in the Urtenen valley, with part on Krauchthaler Mountain.

On 31 December 2009 Amtsbezirk Fraubrunnen, the municipality's former district, was dissolved. On the following day, 1 January 2010, it joined the newly created Verwaltungskreis Bern-Mittelland.

== Coat of arms ==
The blazon of the municipal coat of arms is Gules two Swan Heads addorsed couped Argent beaked Or.

== Demographics ==
Mattstetten has a population (as of December 2020) of 580. As of 2010, 2.8% of the population are resident foreign nationals. Over the last 10 years (2000-2010) the population has changed at a rate of 1.6%. Migration accounted for 0.9%, while births and deaths accounted for 0.7%.

Most of the population (as of 2000) speaks German (566 or 97.1%) as their first language, French is the second most common (4 or 0.7%) and Dutch is the third (3 or 0.5%). There are 2 people who speak Italian.

As of 2008, the population was 50.5% male and 49.5% female. The population was made up of 283 Swiss men (48.8% of the population) and 10 (1.7%) non-Swiss men. There were 281 Swiss women (48.4%) and 6 (1.0%) non-Swiss women. Of the population in the municipality, 124 or about 21.3% were born in Mattstetten and lived there in 2000. There were 261 or 44.8% who were born in the same canton, while 151 or 25.9% were born somewhere else in Switzerland, and 32 or 5.5% were born outside of Switzerland.

As of 2010, children and teenagers (0–19 years old) make up 18.4% of the population, while adults (20–64 years old) make up 62.6% and seniors (over 64 years old) make up 19%.

As of 2000, there were 225 people who were single and never married in the municipality. There were 317 married individuals, 22 widows or widowers and 19 individuals who are divorced.

As of 2000, there were 42 households that consist of only one person and 17 households with five or more people. In 2000, a total of 206 apartments (93.2% of the total) were permanently occupied, while 14 apartments (6.3%) were seasonally occupied and one apartment was empty.

The historical population is given in the following chart:

== Heritage sites of national significance ==
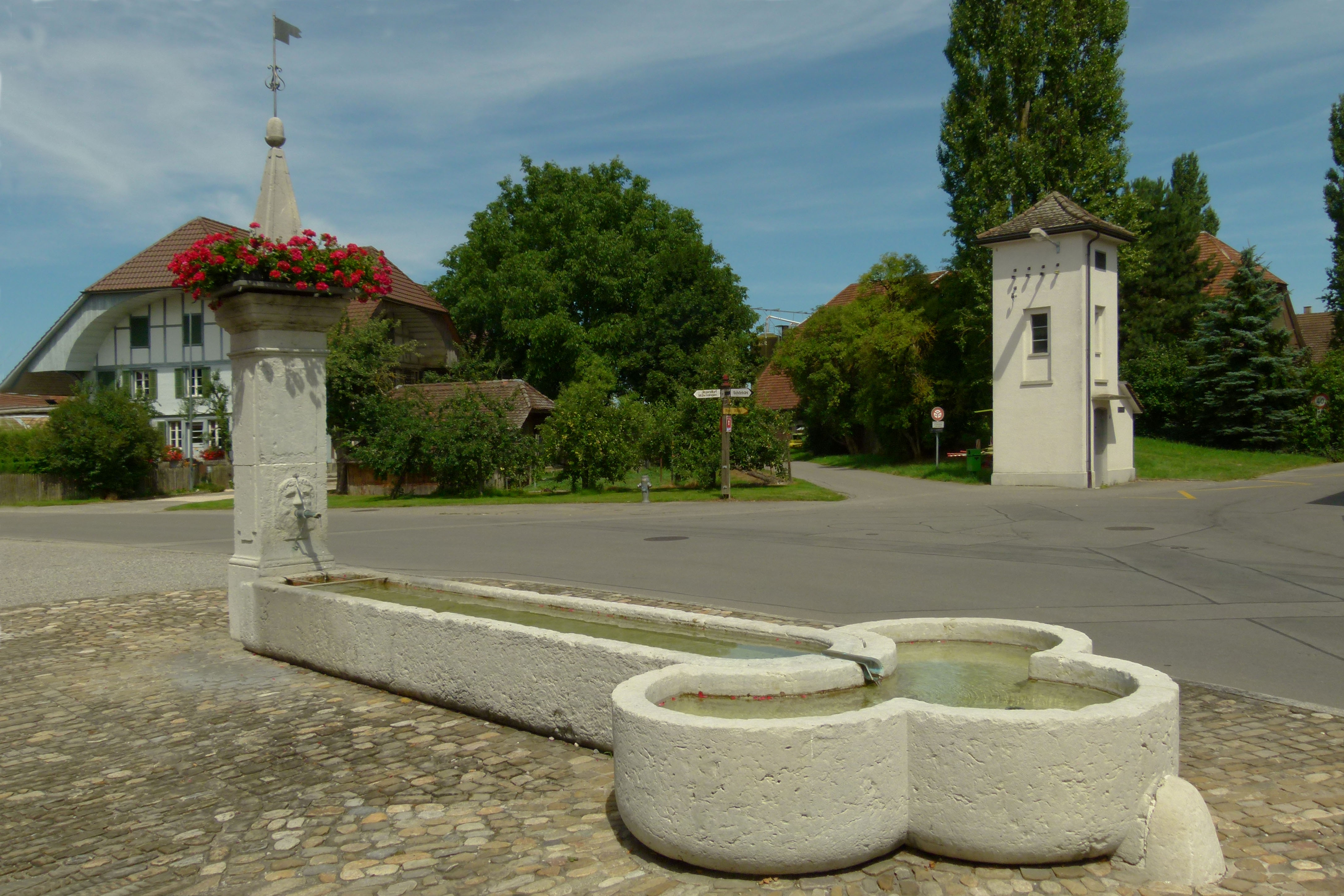
Dorfbrunnen (Village fountain) of Mattstetten

The Dorfbrunnen (fountain) is listed as a Swiss heritage site of national significance.

== Politics ==
In the 2011 federal election the most popular party was the Swiss People's Party (SVP) which received 29.3% of the vote. The next three most popular parties were the Conservative Democratic Party (BDP) (17.7%), the Social Democratic Party (SP) (11.8%) and the FDP.The Liberals (10%). In the federal election, a total of 275 votes were cast, and the voter turnout was 58.1%.

== Economy ==
As of 2011, Mattstetten had an unemployment rate of 1.44%. As of 2008, there were a total of 145 people employed in the municipality. Of these, there were 25 people employed in the primary economic sector and about 8 businesses involved in this sector. 13 people were employed in the secondary sector and there were 4 businesses in this sector. 107 people were employed in the tertiary sector, with 13 businesses in this sector. There were 312 residents of the municipality who were employed in some capacity, of which females made up 43.3% of the workforce.

In 2008 there were a total of 112 full-time equivalent jobs. The number of jobs in the primary sector was 13, all in agriculture. The number of jobs in the secondary sector was 11, all in construction. The number of jobs in the tertiary sector was 88. In the tertiary sector; 51 or 58.0% were in wholesale or retail sales or the repair of motor vehicles, 23 or 26.1% were in the movement and storage of goods, 10 or 11.4% were in a hotel or restaurant and 2 or 2.3% were technical professionals or scientists.

In 2000, there were 68 workers who commuted into the municipality and 245 workers who commuted away. The municipality is a net exporter of workers, with about 3.6 workers leaving the municipality for every one entering. Of the working population, 26.3% used public transportation to get to work, and 47.8% used a private car.

== Religion ==
From the 2000 census, 91 or 15.6% were Roman Catholic, while 435 or 74.6% belonged to the Swiss Reformed Church. Of the rest of the population, there were 32 individuals (or about 5.49% of the population) who belonged to another Christian church. There was 1 individual who was Islamic. There were 2 individuals who were Hindu. 31 (or about 5.32% of the population) belonged to no church, are agnostic or atheist, and 7 individuals (or about 1.20% of the population) did not answer the question.

== Education ==
In Mattstetten about 265 or (45.5%) of the population have completed non-mandatory upper secondary education, and 99 or (17.0%) have completed additional higher education (either university or a Fachhochschule). Of the 99 who completed tertiary schooling, 74.7% were Swiss men, 21.2% were Swiss women.

The Canton of Bern school system provides one year of non-obligatory Kindergarten, followed by six years of Primary school. This is followed by three years of obligatory lower Secondary school where the students are separated according to ability and aptitude. Following the lower Secondary students may attend additional schooling or they may enter an apprenticeship.

During the 2010-11 school year, there were a total of 46 students attending classes in Mattstetten. There was one kindergarten class with a total of 15 students in the municipality. Of the kindergarten students, 40.0% were permanent or temporary residents of Switzerland (not citizens) and 40.0% have a different mother language than the classroom language. The municipality had 2 primary classes and 31 students. Of the primary students, 3.2% were permanent or temporary residents of Switzerland (not citizens).

As of 2000, there was one student in Mattstetten who came from another municipality, while 47 residents attended schools outside the municipality.
