= Münchringen =

- Former municipality
- Flag Coat of arms
- Location of Münchringen
- Location within Switzerland Location within Canton of Bern
- Coordinates: 47°3′N 7°31′E
- Country: Switzerland
- Canton: Bern
- District: Bern-Mittelland

Area
  - Total: 2.4 km^{2} (0.93 sq mi)
- Elevation: 522 m (1,713 ft)

Population (Dec 2011)
  - Total: 596
  - Density: 250/km^{2} (640/sq mi)
- Time zone: UTC+01:00 (CET)
  - Summer (DST): UTC+02:00 (CEST)
- Postal code: 3303
- SFOS number: 547
- ISO 3166 code: CH-BE
- Surrounded by: Hindelbank, Jegenstorf, Kernenried, Mattstetten, Zauggenried
- Website: SFSO statistics

Münchringen is a former municipality in the Bern-Mittelland administrative district in the canton of Bern in Switzerland. On 1 January 2014 the former municipalities of Münchringen and Scheunen merged into the municipality of Jegenstorf.

== History ==
Münchringen is first mentioned around 1261–63 as Munderchingen. The Holzmühle settlement was first mentioned in 1271.

The oldest trace of a settlement in the area is a cluster of Hallstatt era grave mounds at Hursch and Waldäcker. By the 13th century Münchringen and Holzmühle were both owned by the Counts of Kyburg and were part of the Kyburg low court in Alchenflüh. After the extinction of the Kyburg line, the villages came under Bern's control. In 1518 the villages successfully requested that they would henceforth be administered from Kernenried. Following the Act of Mediation, Münchringen became part of the Fraubrunnen district. In 1844–45, the formerly independent hamlet of Holzmühle became part of the political municipality of Münchringen. However, Holzmühle remained part of the parish of Jegenstorf.

In 1944–46, levees and canals helped control the Urtenen river and prevent periodic flooding. The completion of a highway on the municipal border in 1965 encouraged population and industrial growth in Münchringen. The formerly agricultural village is now commuter town with almost four fifths of the working population traveling to the region around Bern for work.

== Geography ==
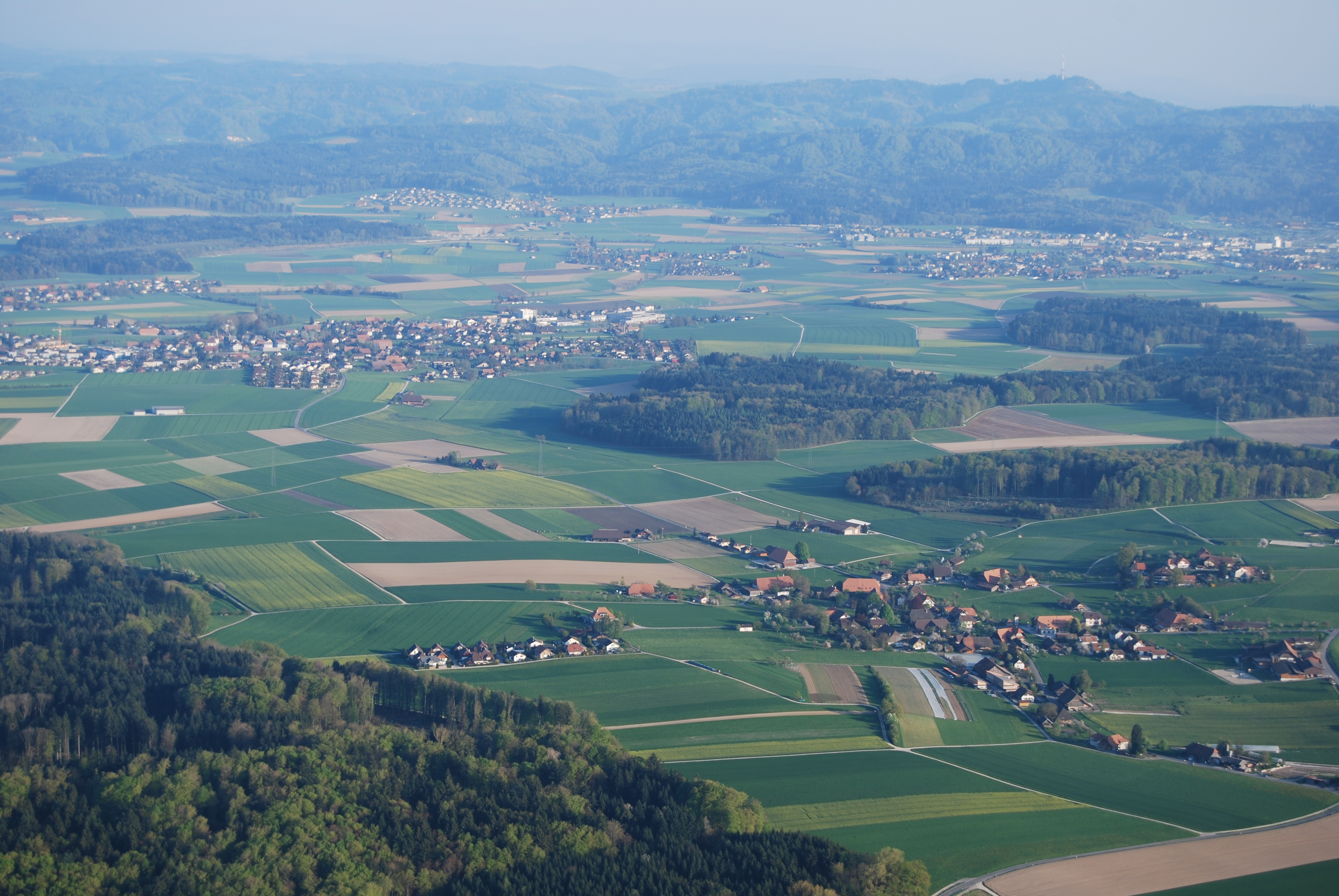
Aerial view of the land around Münchringen. Münchringen is visible in the upper left corner.

Before the merger, Münchringen had a total area of 2.4 km^{2} (0.93 mi^{2}). Of this area, 1.84 km^{2} (0.71 mi^{2}) or 76.7% is used for agricultural purposes, while 0.24 km^{2} (0.093 mi^{2}) or 10.0% is forested. Of the rest of the land, 0.24 km^{2} (0.093 mi^{2}) or 10.0% is settled (buildings or roads), 0.06 km^{2} (15 acres) or 2.5% is either rivers or lakes and 0.01 km^{2} (2.5 acres) or 0.4% is unproductive land.

Of the built up area, housing and buildings made up 6.7% and transportation infrastructure made up 2.9%. Out of the forested land, all of the forested land area is covered with heavy forests. Of the agricultural land, 66.3% is used for growing crops and 10.4% is pastures. All the water in the municipality is flowing water.

The former municipality is located in the Urtenen valley. It includes the village of Münchringen and the hamlet of Holzmühle.

On 31 December 2009 Amtsbezirk Fraubrunnen, the municipality's former district, was dissolved. On the following day, 1 January 2010, it joined the newly created Verwaltungskreis Bern-Mittelland.

== Coat of arms ==
The blazon of the municipal coat of arms is Per pale Gules and Argent overall a Ploughshare conjoined with a Patriarchal Cross and in chief two Mullets all chounterchanged.

== Demographics ==
Münchringen had a population (as of 2011) of 596. As of 2010, 2.9% of the population are resident foreign nationals. Over the last 10 years (2000–2010) the population has changed at a rate of 8.5%. Migration accounted for 7.7%, while births and deaths accounted for 1.3%.

Most of the population (as of 2000) speaks German (513 or 96.2%) as their first language, French is the second most common (4 or 0.8%) and Romansh is the third (4 or 0.8%). There are 2 people who speak Italian.

As of 2008, the population was 49.1% male and 50.9% female. The population was made up of 277 Swiss men (47.1% of the population) and 12 (2.0%) non-Swiss men. There were 294 Swiss women (50.0%) and 5 (0.9%) non-Swiss women. Of the population in the municipality, 117 or about 22.0% were born in Münchringen and lived there in 2000. There were 271 or 50.8% who were born in the same canton, while 105 or 19.7% were born somewhere else in Switzerland, and 26 or 4.9% were born outside of Switzerland.

As of 2010, children and teenagers (0–19 years old) make up 23.1% of the population, while adults (20–64 years old) make up 59% and seniors (over 64 years old) make up 17.9%.

As of 2000, there were 200 people who were single and never married in the municipality. There were 293 married individuals, 22 widows or widowers and 18 individuals who are divorced.

As of 2000, there were 37 households that consist of only one person and 22 households with five or more people. In 2000, a total of 194 apartments (98.5% of the total) were permanently occupied, while 2 apartments (1.0%) were seasonally occupied and one apartment was empty. As of 2010, the construction rate of new housing units was 1.7 new units per 1000 residents. The vacancy rate for the municipality, in 2011, was 0.43%.

The historical population is given in the following chart:

== Politics ==
In the 2011 federal election the most popular party was the Conservative Democratic Party (BDP) which received 21.7% of the vote. The next three most popular parties were the Social Democratic Party (SP) (16.9%), the Swiss People's Party (SVP) (16.8%) and the Evangelical People's Party (EVP) (11.5%). In the federal election, a total of 301 votes were cast, and the voter turnout was 64.0%.

== Economy ==
As of 2011, Münchringen had an unemployment rate of 1.33%. As of 2008, there were a total of 59 people employed in the municipality. Of these, there were 26 people employed in the primary economic sector and about 8 businesses involved in this sector. 8 people were employed in the secondary sector and there were 4 businesses in this sector. 25 people were employed in the tertiary sector, with 9 businesses in this sector. There were 309 residents of the municipality who were employed in some capacity, of which females made up 41.7% of the workforce.

In 2008 there were a total of 42 full-time equivalent jobs. The number of jobs in the primary sector was 17, all of which were in agriculture. The number of jobs in the secondary sector was 6 of which 3 were in manufacturing and 3 were in construction. The number of jobs in the tertiary sector was 19. In the tertiary sector; 3 or 15.8% were in wholesale or retail sales or the repair of motor vehicles, 2 or 10.5% were in a hotel or restaurant, 1 was in the information industry, 9 or 47.4% were technical professionals or scientists, and 2 or 10.5% were in health care.

In 2000, there were 35 workers who commuted into the municipality and 262 workers who commuted away. The municipality is a net exporter of workers, with about 7.5 workers leaving the municipality for every one entering. Of the working population, 24.9% used public transportation to get to work, and 55% used a private car.

== Religion ==
From the 2000 census, 63 or 11.8% were Roman Catholic, while 413 or 77.5% belonged to the Swiss Reformed Church. Of the rest of the population, there was 1 member of an Orthodox church, there were 5 individuals (or about 0.94% of the population) who belonged to the Christian Catholic Church, and there were 34 individuals (or about 6.38% of the population) who belonged to another Christian church. There was 1 individual who was Islamic. There were 4 individuals who were Hindu. 12 (or about 2.25% of the population) belonged to no church, are agnostic or atheist, and 16 individuals (or about 3.00% of the population) did not answer the question.

== Education ==
In Münchringen about 246 or (46.2%) of the population have completed non-mandatory upper secondary education, and 83 or (15.6%) have completed additional higher education (either university or a Fachhochschule). Of the 83 who completed tertiary schooling, 75.9% were Swiss men, 24.1% were Swiss women.

The Canton of Bern school system provides one year of non-obligatory Kindergarten, followed by six years of Primary school. This is followed by three years of obligatory lower Secondary school where the students are separated according to ability and aptitude. Following the lower Secondary students may attend additional schooling or they may enter an apprenticeship.

During the 2010–11 school year, there were a total of 12 students attending classes in Münchringen. There was one kindergarten class with all 12 students. Of the kindergarten students, 8.3% were permanent or temporary residents of Switzerland (not citizens) and 25.0% have a different mother language than the classroom language.

As of 2000, there were 72 students from Münchringen who attended schools outside the municipality.
