= Urtenen =

Urtenen can refer to:

- Urtenen-Schönbühl, a municipality in the Canton of Bern, Switzerland, or a town within it.
- Urtenen (river), a stream in the Canton of Bern.
