= Jegenstorf Castle =

Castle in Jegensdorf, Bern, Switzerland

- Schloss Jegenstorf
- Jegenstorf
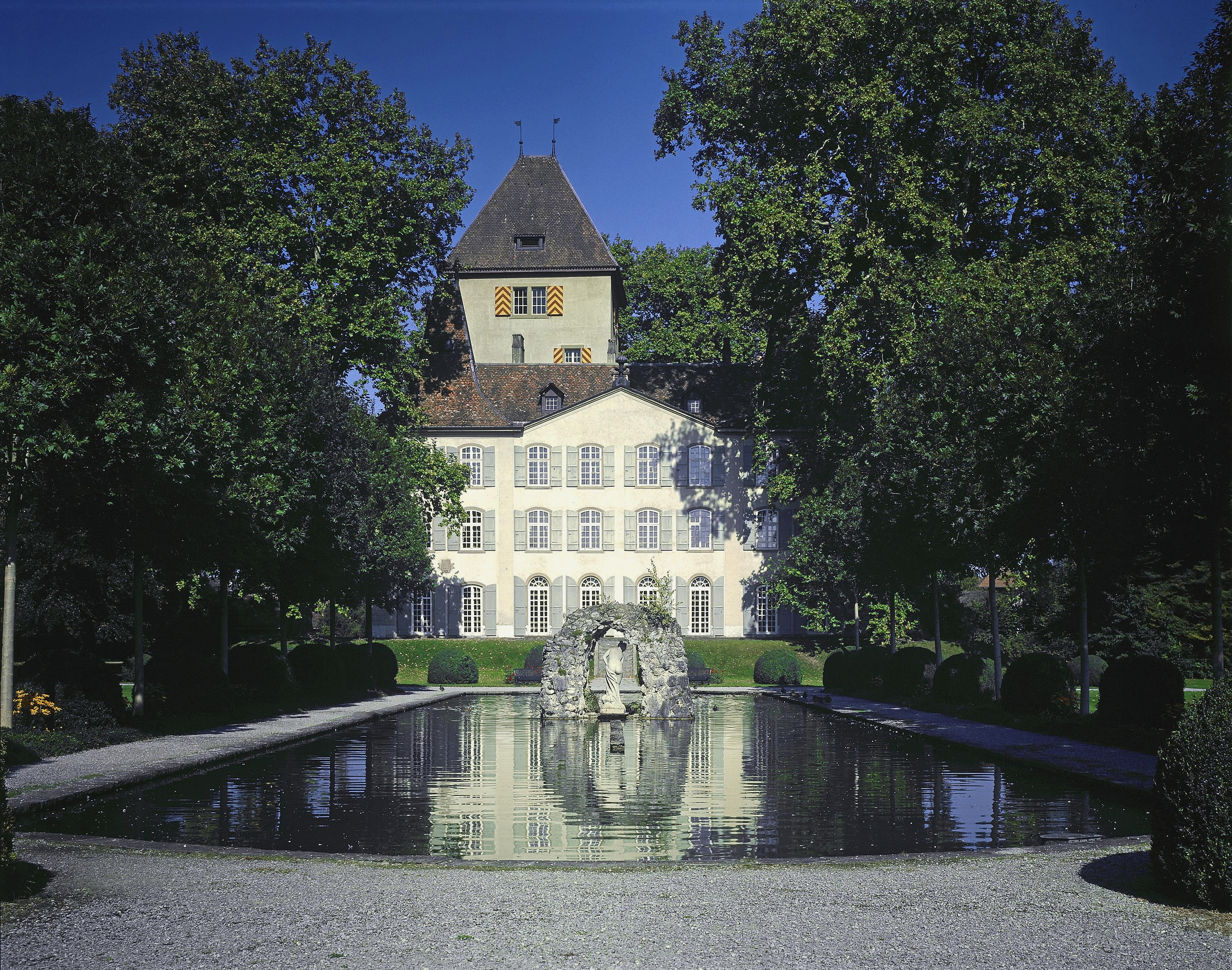
- Jegenstorf Castle

Site information
- Open to the public: yes
- Condition: converted into a museum

Location
- Coordinates: 47.047829°N 7.509621°E

Site history
- Built: begun in the 12th century
- Built by: Lords of Jegistorf
- Materials: Stone

Jegenstorf Castle is a castle in the municipality of Jegenstorf of the Canton of Bern in Switzerland. It is a Swiss heritage site of national significance.

== History ==
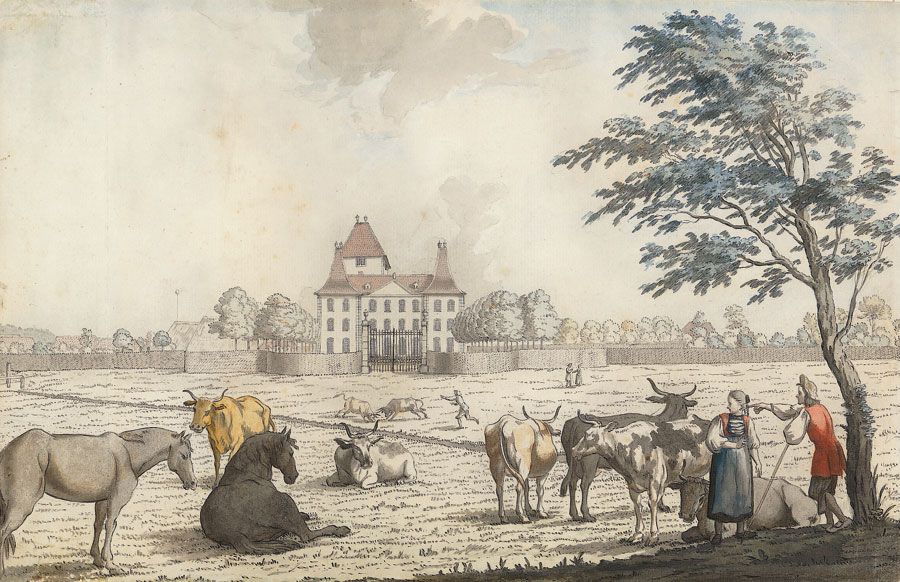
Jegenstorf Castle, by Samuel Hieronymus Grimm in 1764

The Lords of Jegistorf were first mentioned in the 12th century, in the service of the Dukes of Zähringen. They built the large square castle tower around that time. The original castle was probably surrounded by wooden walls. During the 13th and 14th centuries, the wooden walls were replaced with stone. In 1300, shortly before the Lords of Jegenstorf died out, the Erlach family acquired the herrschaft of Jegenstorf. However, the Jegistorf holdings had already been divided and the castle remained out of Erlach hands until the 14th or 15th century. Through a combination of political marriages and purchases, in 1519, Johann von Erlach (1474–1539) became the ruler of the castle, the village, the herrschaft and the Jegenstorf court. During the same year he also became the Schultheiss of Bern. It remained in Erlach hands until 1584. In 1584 it passed to the von Bonstetten family, who held it until 1675. It then went to the von Wattenwyl family who held it until 1720. In 1720 Albrecht Friedrich von Erlach bought the castle back. Under Albrecht Friedrich, the castle was expanded and renovated. The old tower was rebuilt as a baroque tower house and the castle converted into a country manor house.

In the 18th century the castle passed to the Stürler family. In 1765 Anton Ludwig Stürler sold the castle to his brother Johann Rudolf Stürler, who passed it on to his son Johann Rudolf in 1789. The castle was spared any damage during the 1798 French invasion. By 1812, however, Johann Rudolf was in financial difficulties and sold the castle to his cousin Rudolf Gabriel Stürler of Serraux. In 1913–1915 the house was renovated and modernized under Arthur Albert Vinzenz von Stürler. After the death of Arthur Albert Vinzenz in 1934, the castle was purchased by a preservation association.

On 9 October 1944 General Henri Guisan, the supreme commander of the Swiss Army, moved his command post from Interlaken to Jegenstorf. At the same time, much of the army's General Staff moved to Burgdorf. Guisan set up his command post in Jegenstorf castle. He was given two rooms in the castle in the south-west wing for his personal use.

In 1954, a foundation was created to preserve and operate the castle and create a museum. Since 1955, the village museum of Jegenstorf has been open in the castle.

== Castle site ==
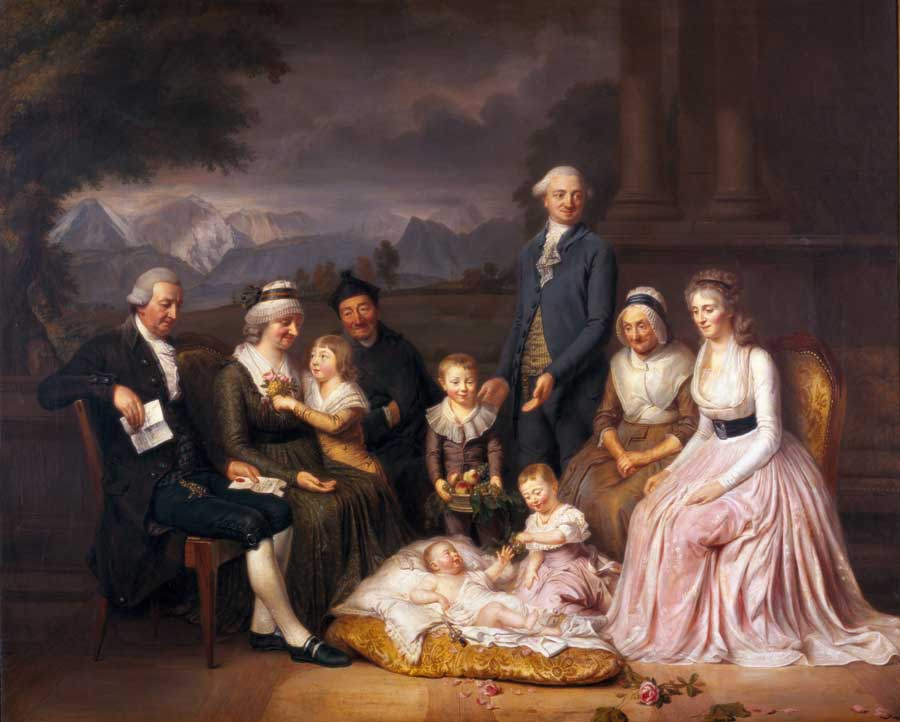
Painting of Samuel Brunner and his family from the Jegenstorf museum

Originally the castle consisted of a square tower. During the High Middle Ages it expanded to a castle with a keep, a corner tower, a housing wing and a central courtyard. The castle was surrounded by a double, water filled moat. In 1720 it was converted into a baroque manor house. Three more corner towers were added to join the original south-eastern corner tower and a hallway was added to join the towers together. The four towers formed a symmetrical box around the original keep. The main northern entrance into the keep was updated with a grand staircase, a balcony and decorative carvings. The south and eastern facades each received a triangular pediment.

The interior was redecorated in 1913–15. The dining room was decorated with a series of allegorical paintings of the affairs of Katharina Perregaux-von Wattenwyl, which were painted in 1690 by Joseph Werner for Reichenbach Castle. Several masonry heaters from the 18th century were moved into the castle during this renovation. Two of the most interesting are covered in blue glazed tiles and are signed and dated by Urs Johann Wiswalt in 1723. In the first upper story, the so-called Herkulessaal (Hercules hall) is decorated with a statue of Hercules battling the Hydra from the 17th century. The castle is surrounded by a large park with an 18th-century Orangery and a neo-Gothic pavilion which was built in 1890. The pavilion is decorated with a statue of Minerva which was carved by Johann Friedrich I Funk in 1773.

== See also ==
- List of castles in Switzerland
