= Kernenried =

- Municipality
- Flag Coat of arms
- Location of Kernenried
- Location within Switzerland Location within Canton of Bern
- Coordinates: 47°4′N 7°33′E
- Country: Switzerland
- Canton: Bern
- District: Emmental

Government
  - Executive: Gemeinderat with 5 members
  - Mayor: Gemeindepräsident(in); Adrian Zemp (as of 2026)

Area
  - Total: 3.3 km^{2} (1.3 sq mi)
- Elevation: 506 m (1,660 ft)

Population (December 2020)
  - Total: 547
  - Density: 170/km^{2} (430/sq mi)
- Time zone: UTC+01:00 (CET)
  - Summer (DST): UTC+02:00 (CEST)
- Postal code: 3309
- SFOS number: 411
- ISO 3166 code: CH-BE
- Surrounded by: Fraubrunnen, Hindelbank, Lyssach, Münchringen, Zauggenried
- Website: https://www.kernenried.ch/

Kernenried is a municipality in the administrative district of Emmental in the canton of Bern in Switzerland.

== History ==
Kernenried was first mentioned around 1261-63 as Reide, in 1318 it was mentioned as Kerrenriet.

The earliest trace of a settlement in the area is a Hallstatt grave mound near Oberholz-Schulwald. A horde of Roman era coins was discovered near the border with Zauggenried. During the Middle Ages the Herrschaft of Kernenried was owned by the Ministerialis (unfree knights in the service of a feudal overlord) family of Kerro, who were in the service of the Counts of Kyburg. The Kerro family ruled Kernenried from their water castle in Mösli. However, the castle was destroyed by Bern in 1318 and the Kerro lands were acquired by Bern. In the following years, the Bernese patrician von Erlach family received the village as part of a dowry. In 1579 the village was given to the obere Spital in Bern to help support this hospital. After the Act of Mediation in 1803, the village was assigned to Burgdorf district.

The village chapel was supported by the Kirchberg parish. After the Protestant Reformation the chapel was abandoned and eventually demolished. The village remains part of the Kirchberg parish.

Even though the proximity of a highway has encouraged some commuters to move into the village, it has retained its agricultural and small business character. Together with the nearby municipality of Zauggenried, they form a school district.

== Geography ==
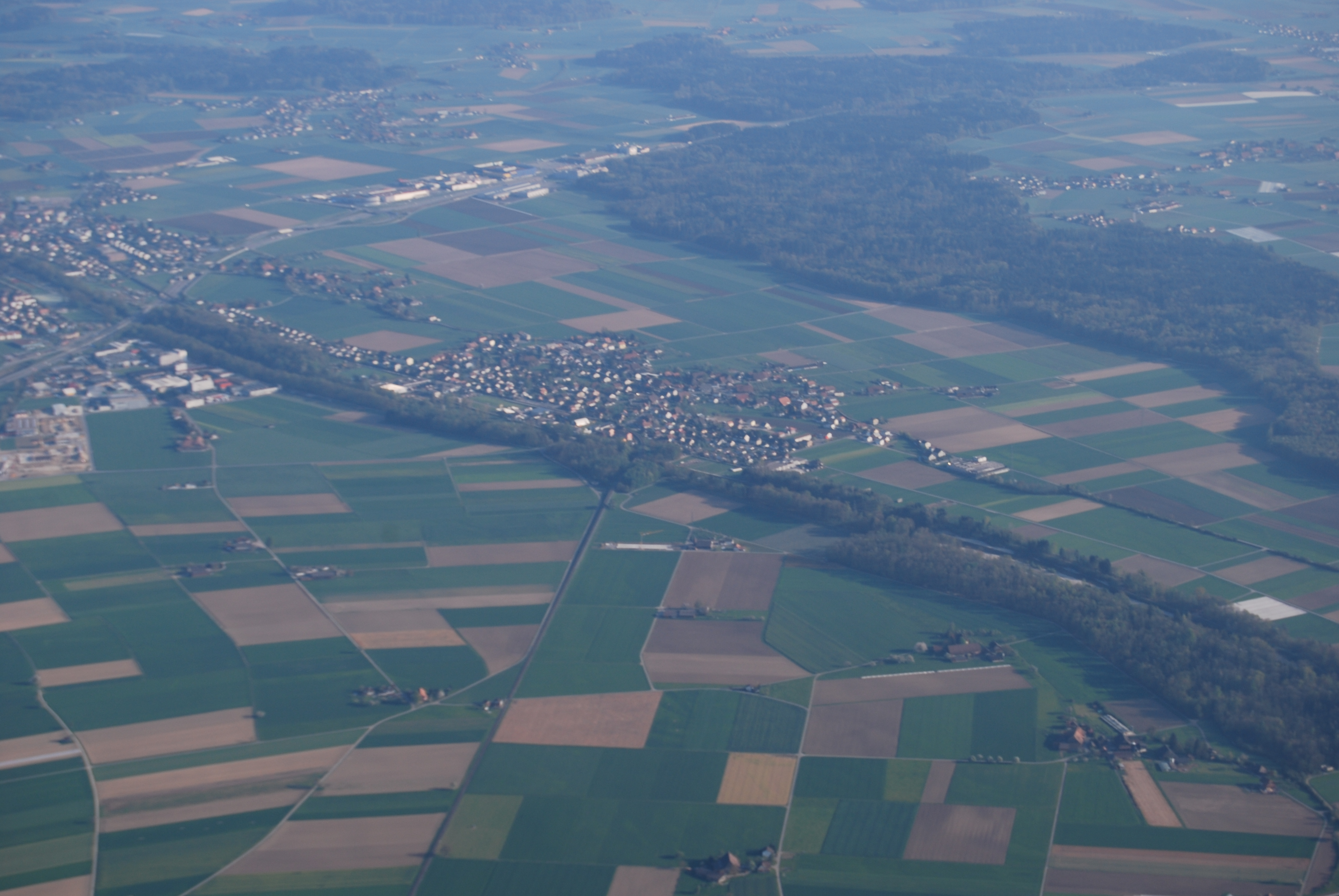
Aerial view that includes Kernenried in the upper right side.

Kernenried has an area of 3.33 km^{2} (1.29 sq mi). Of this area, 2 km^{2} (0.77 mi^{2}) or 60.1% is used for agricultural purposes, while 0.79 km^{2} (0.31 mi^{2}) or 23.7% is forested. Of the rest of the land, 0.49 km^{2} (0.19 mi^{2}) or 14.7% is settled (buildings or roads), 0.03 km^{2} (7.4 acres) or 0.9% is either rivers or lakes and 0.01 km^{2} (2.5 acres) or 0.3% is unproductive land.

Of the built up area, housing and buildings made up 3.9% and transportation infrastructure made up 9.3%. Power and water infrastructure as well as other special developed areas made up 1.5% of the area Out of the forested land, all of the forested land area is covered with heavy forests. Of the agricultural land, 51.4% is used for growing crops and 7.5% is pastures, while 1.2% is used for orchards or vine crops. All the water in the municipality is flowing water.

The municipality is located on the Urtenen river.

On 31 December 2009 Amtsbezirk Burgdorf, the municipality's former district, was dissolved. On the following day, 1 January 2010, it joined the newly created Verwaltungskreis Emmental.

== Coat of arms ==
The blazon of the municipal coat of arms is Gules a Bend and a Mullet Argent.

== Demographics ==
Kernenried has a population (as of December 2020) of 547. As of 2010, 6.8% of the population are resident foreign nationals. Over the last 10 years (2000-2010) the population has changed at a rate of -1.6%. Migration accounted for -1.8%, while births and deaths accounted for 1.6%.

Most of the population (as of 2000) speaks German (436 or 98.0%) as their first language, Macedonian is the second most common (4 or 0.9%) and French is the third (1 or 0.2%).

As of 2008, the population was 49.0% male and 51.0% female. The population was made up of 200 Swiss men (45.1% of the population) and 17 (3.8%) non-Swiss men. There were 213 Swiss women (48.1%) and 13 (2.9%) non-Swiss women. Of the population in the municipality, 142 or about 31.9% were born in Kernenried and lived there in 2000. There were 227 or 51.0% who were born in the same canton, while 51 or 11.5% were born somewhere else in Switzerland, and 16 or 3.6% were born outside of Switzerland.

As of 2010, children and teenagers (0–19 years old) make up 20.5% of the population, while adults (20–64 years old) make up 61.6% and seniors (over 64 years old) make up 17.8%.

As of 2000, there were 165 people who were single and never married in the municipality. There were 247 married individuals, 17 widows or widowers and 16 individuals who are divorced.

As of 2000, there were 28 households that consist of only one person and 16 households with five or more people. In 2000, a total of 163 apartments (93.1% of the total) were permanently occupied, while 9 apartments (5.1%) were seasonally occupied and 3 apartments (1.7%) were empty.

The historical population is given in the following chart:

== Politics ==
In the 2011 federal election the most popular party was the Swiss People's Party (SVP) which received 33.1% of the vote. The next three most popular parties were the Conservative Democratic Party (BDP) (26.6%), the Social Democratic Party (SP) (14.7%) and the Green Liberal Party (GLP) (6.9%). In the federal election, a total of 152 votes were cast, and the voter turnout was 44.7%.

== Economy ==
As of 2011, Kernenried had an unemployment rate of 1.59%. As of 2008, there were a total of 104 people employed in the municipality. Of these, there were 36 people employed in the primary economic sector and about 10 businesses involved in this sector. 13 people were employed in the secondary sector and there were 2 businesses in this sector. 55 people were employed in the tertiary sector, with 12 businesses in this sector.

In 2008 there were a total of 75 full-time equivalent jobs. The number of jobs in the primary sector was 26, all of which were in agriculture. The number of jobs in the secondary sector was 11, all of which were in manufacturing. The number of jobs in the tertiary sector was 38. In the tertiary sector; 16 or 42.1% were in wholesale or retail sales or the repair of motor vehicles, 8 or 21.1% were in a hotel or restaurant, 1 was a technical professional or scientist, 4 or 10.5% were in education.

In 2000, there were 25 workers who commuted into the municipality and 190 workers who commuted away. The municipality is a net exporter of workers, with about 7.6 workers leaving the municipality for every one entering. Of the working population, 11.8% used public transportation to get to work, and 53.7% used a private car.

== Religion ==
From the 2000 census, 28 or 6.3% were Roman Catholic, while 368 or 82.7% belonged to the Swiss Reformed Church. Of the rest of the population, there was 1 member of an Orthodox church, and there were 8 individuals (or about 1.80% of the population) who belonged to another Christian church. There were 5 (or about 1.12% of the population) who were Islamic. There were 2 individuals who belonged to another church. 28 (or about 6.29% of the population) belonged to no church, are agnostic or atheist, and 9 individuals (or about 2.02% of the population) did not answer the question.

== Education ==
In Kernenried about 201 or (45.2%) of the population have completed non-mandatory upper secondary education, and 60 or (13.5%) have completed additional higher education (either university or a Fachhochschule). Of the 60 who completed tertiary schooling, 73.3% were Swiss men, 26.7% were Swiss women.

The Canton of Bern school system provides one year of non-obligatory Kindergarten, followed by six years of Primary school. This is followed by three years of obligatory lower Secondary school where the students are separated according to ability and aptitude. Following the lower Secondary students may attend additional schooling or they may enter an apprenticeship.

During the 2010-11 school year, there were a total of 57 students attending classes in Kernenried. There was one kindergarten class with a total of 8 students in the municipality. The municipality had 3 primary classes and 49 students. Of the primary students 6.1% have a different mother language than the classroom language.

As of 2000, there were 24 students in Kernenried who came from another municipality, while 32 residents attended schools outside the municipality.
