= Krauchthal =

- Municipality
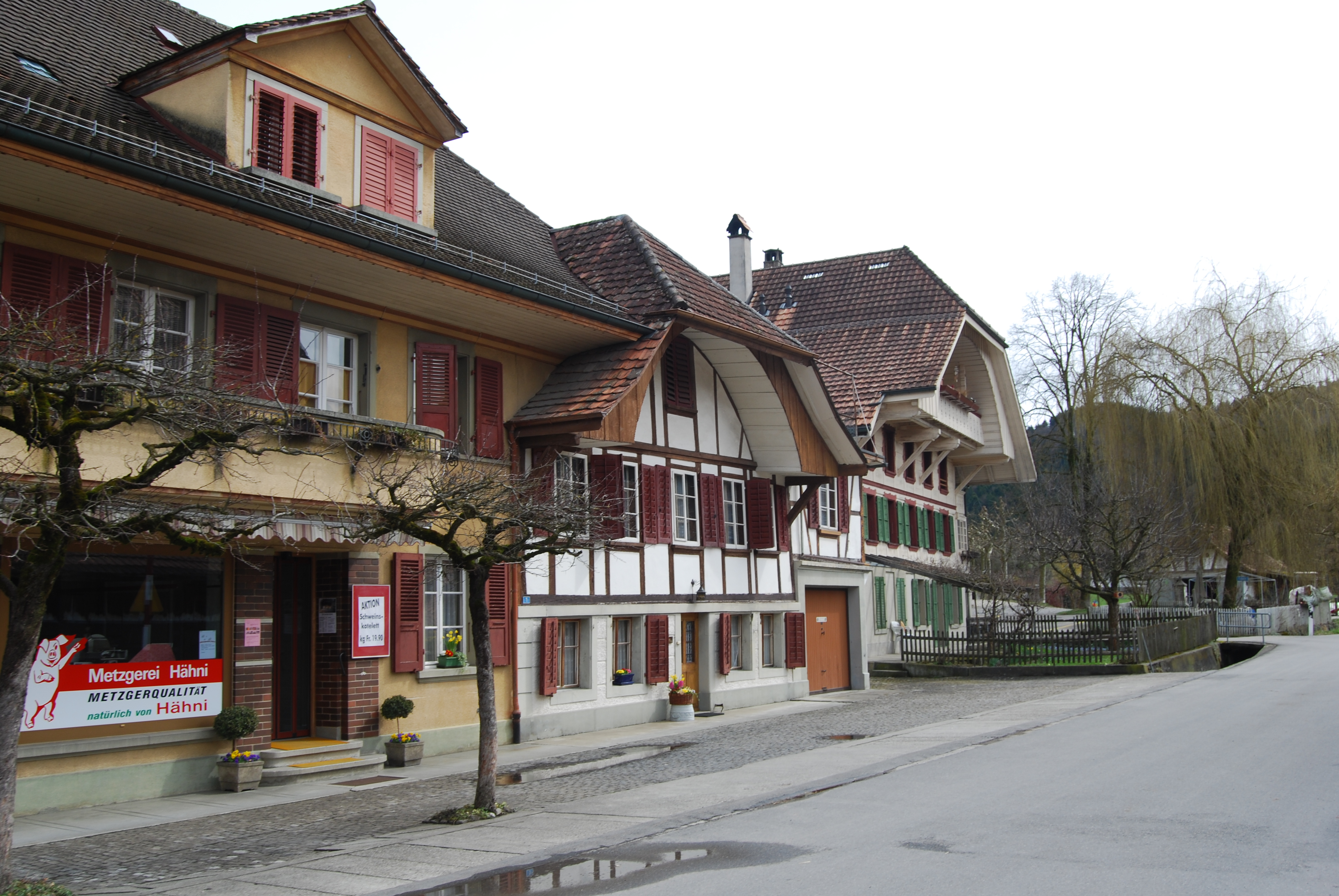
- Half-timbered houses in the center of Krauchthal village

- Flag Coat of arms
- Location of Krauchthal
- Location within Switzerland Location within Canton of Bern
- Coordinates: 47°1′N 7°34′E
- Country: Switzerland
- Canton: Bern
- District: Emmental

Government
  - Executive: Gemeinderat with 7 members
  - Mayor: Gemeindepräsident(in); Markus Iseli (as of 2026)

Area
  - Total: 19.44 km^{2} (7.51 sq mi)
- Elevation: 585 m (1,919 ft)

Population (December 2020)
  - Total: 2,384
  - Density: 122.6/km^{2} (317.6/sq mi)
- Time zone: UTC+01:00 (CET)
  - Summer (DST): UTC+02:00 (CEST)
- Postal code: 3326
- SFOS number: 414
- ISO 3166 code: CH-BE
- Localities: Dieterswald, Hettiswil, Hub, Krauchthal
- Surrounded by: Bäriswil, Bolligen, Burgdorf, Hindelbank, Lützelflüh, Mattstetten, Mötschwil, Oberburg, Vechigen
- Twin towns: Kamenný Újezd (Czech Republic)
- Website: www.krauchthal.ch

Krauchthal is a municipality in the administrative district of Emmental in the canton of Bern in Switzerland.

== History ==
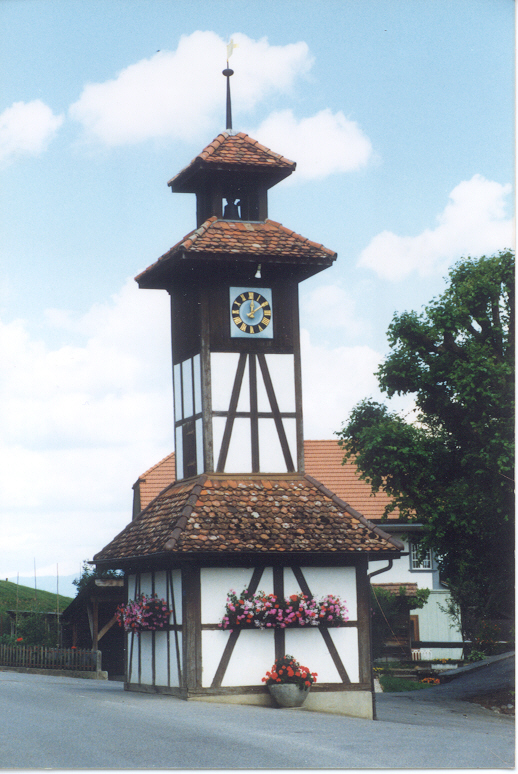
The Lindenzytli with a bell, that was part of the former Cluniac Priory of Hettiswil

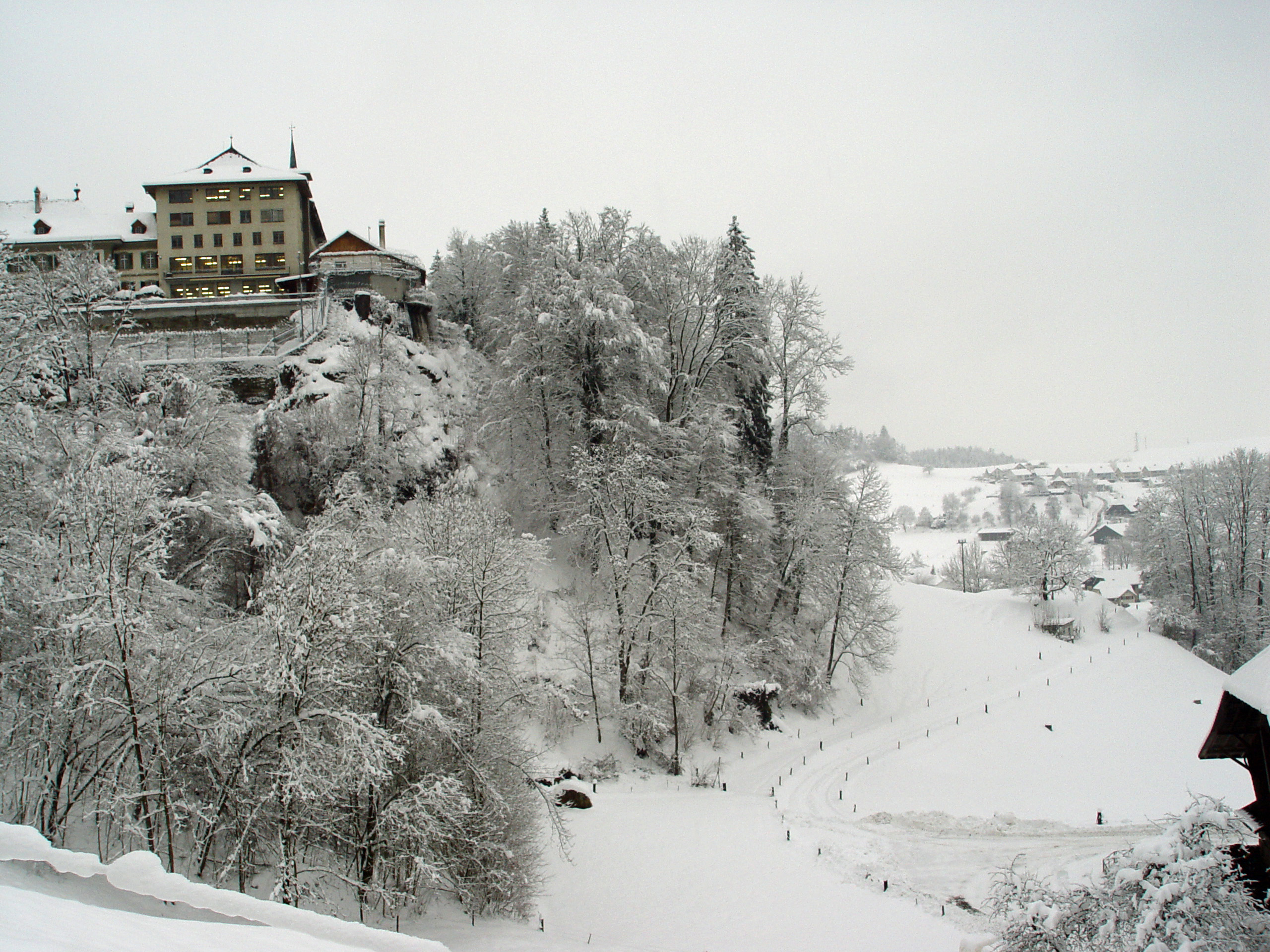
Thorberg prison in winter

Aerial view (1954)

Krauchthal was first mentioned around 1108-22 as Crouchtal and around 1181-82 as Crochtal. Hettiswil village was first mentioned in 1107 as Otthonis villare and in 1281 it was Ettiswile.

The oldest traces of settlements near Krauchthal are neolithic flints which were discovered in Mooshubel and Buech. The wooden posts of a Roman settlement were found on the Thornberg along the remains of a Roman manor on the north side of the valley. During the Middle Ages there were three castles or fortifications, Thorberg Castle, Liebenfels-Sodfluh Castle and the high medieval fortification of Tannstigli, within sight of each other in the modern borders of the municipality. Between 1175 and 1397 Thorberg Castle was home to the Lords of Thorberg. After the death of Peter von Thorberg, in 1397, he left his many estates to the Carthusians who converted the castle into a monastery or chapterhouse. The Carthusians became the largest land holders in Krauchthal. The Krauchthal village church of St. Mauritius was first mentioned in 1270.

The Cluniac Priory of Hettiswil was built during the High Middle Ages in the nearby village, but today only the foundation of the romanesque Priory church is visible. The Priory was responsible for a chapel on Sandhubel which was first mentioned in 1560, but no trace of the building exists. The village of Hettiswil and the right to hold the low court in the village were given to the Priory in 1107. In 1406 both the low and high courts in Hettiswil came under Bernese control, though the Priory remained a major landowner.

Beginning in the Middle Ages, there were cliff dwellings in the Linden valley (German: Lindental). They have been permanently inhabited since the 16th century.

Both Krauchthal and Hettiswil remained under the power of the Carthusian Monastery and the Cluniac Priory until Bern accepted the Protestant Reformation. In 1528, Bern secularized nearly all religious houses in the canton and acquired all their properties and rights. A Bernese vogt was appointed and ruled the municipality from Thorberg Castle. Hettiswil was made part of the parish of Krauchthal.

Thorberg Castle remained the seat of the Bernese vogt until 1798, but it also housed other care organizations including an almshouse. In 1805 the former almshouse became a reformatory, model school and "ancillary lunatic asylum". To these were added in 1807 a further institution for the accommodation of those who "had not really merited imprisonment". The care organisations were replaced on 1 November 1849 by a workhouse or forced labor unit. After the opening of the psychiatric clinic at Waldau near Bern, the "ancillary asylum" could be closed, in 1855. In 1893 a newly built cell block was opened as a prison; various other extensions were added during the 20th century, most recently in 1998.

Hettiswil, Krauchthal and Hub formed an agricultural cooperative that organized forest grazing and timber rights in 1470. By 1550, they had cleared the forest at Längenberg and divided it among their farmers. After the secularization of the monasteries, a representative of the Bernese vogt administered the former ecclesiastical land. However, in 1534 and in 1560 the land was sold to local farmers. By the early 19th century, many farmers switched from growing grain to raising dairy cattle and hay. In 1848 a dairy and cheese factory opened in the village. Between 1855 and 1863 the community drained the bogs on the valley floor, which opened up more farm land. In addition to agriculture, the institute and prison at Thorberg and a sandstone quarry provided jobs for the residents of the municipality.

== Geography ==
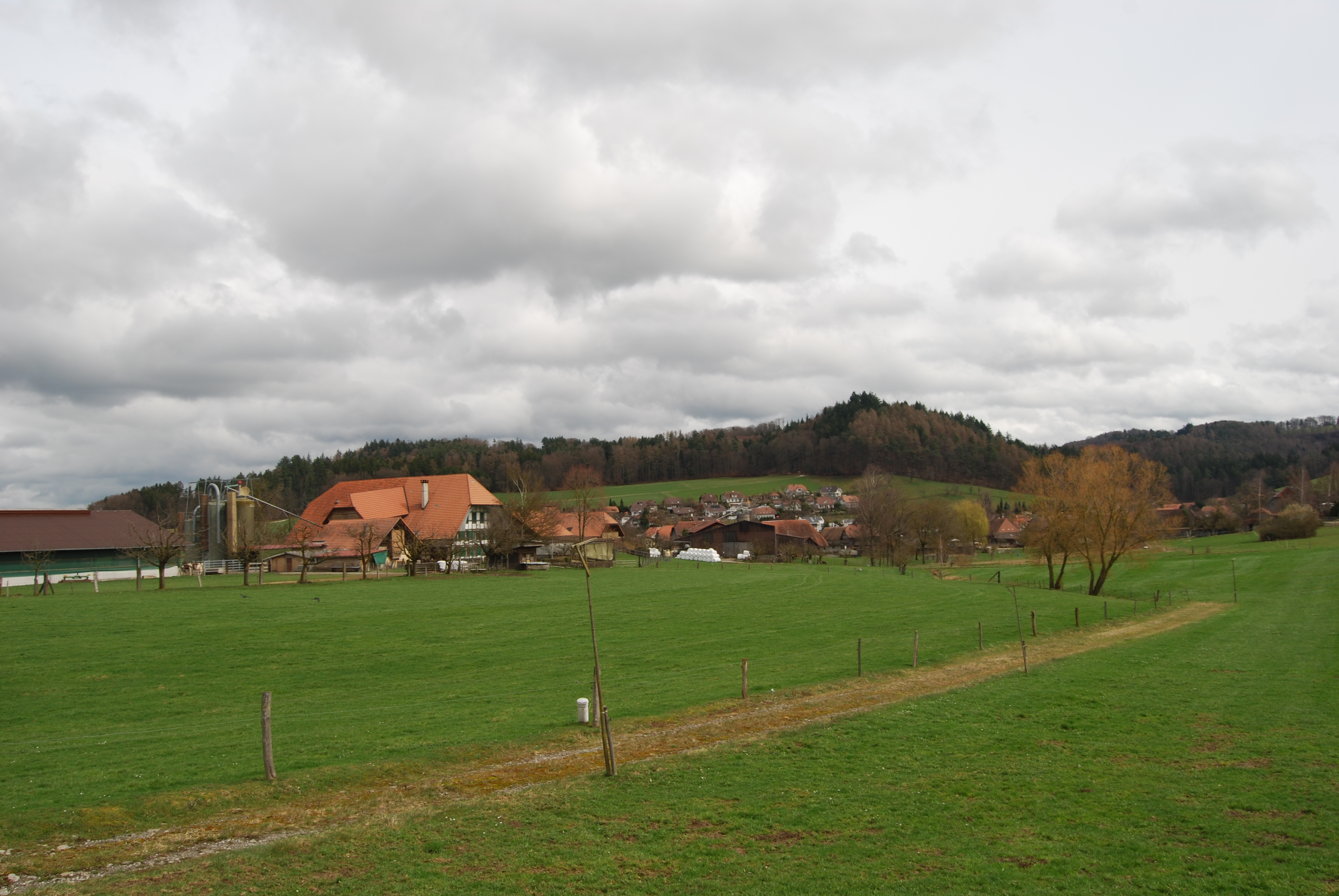
Hettiswil village, part of the municipality of Krauchthal

Krauchthal has an area of 19.43 km^{2} (7.50 sq mi). Of this area, 8.25 km^{2} (3.19 mi^{2}) or 42.5% is used for agricultural purposes, while 9.63 km^{2} (3.72 mi^{2}) or 49.6% is forested. Of the rest of the land, 1.36 km^{2} (0.53 mi^{2}) or 7.0% is settled (buildings or roads), 0.1 km^{2} (25 acres) or 0.5% is either rivers or lakes and 0.02 km^{2} (4.9 acres) or 0.1% is unproductive land.

Of the built up area, housing and buildings made up 3.4% and transportation infrastructure made up 3.0%. Out of the forested land, all of the forested land area is covered with heavy forests. Of the agricultural land, 19.5% is used for growing crops and 22.1% is pastures. All the water in the municipality is flowing water.

Krauchthal includes the village of Krauchthal, Hettiswil and Hub im Tal as well as Dieterswald and Thorberg on the hill.

On 31 December 2009 Amtsbezirk Burgdorf, the municipality's former district, was dissolved. On the following day, 1 January 2010, it joined the newly created Verwaltungskreis Emmental.

== Coat of arms ==
The blazon of the municipal coat of arms is Argent a Bend Gules between two Roses of the same barbed and seeded proper.

== Demographics ==
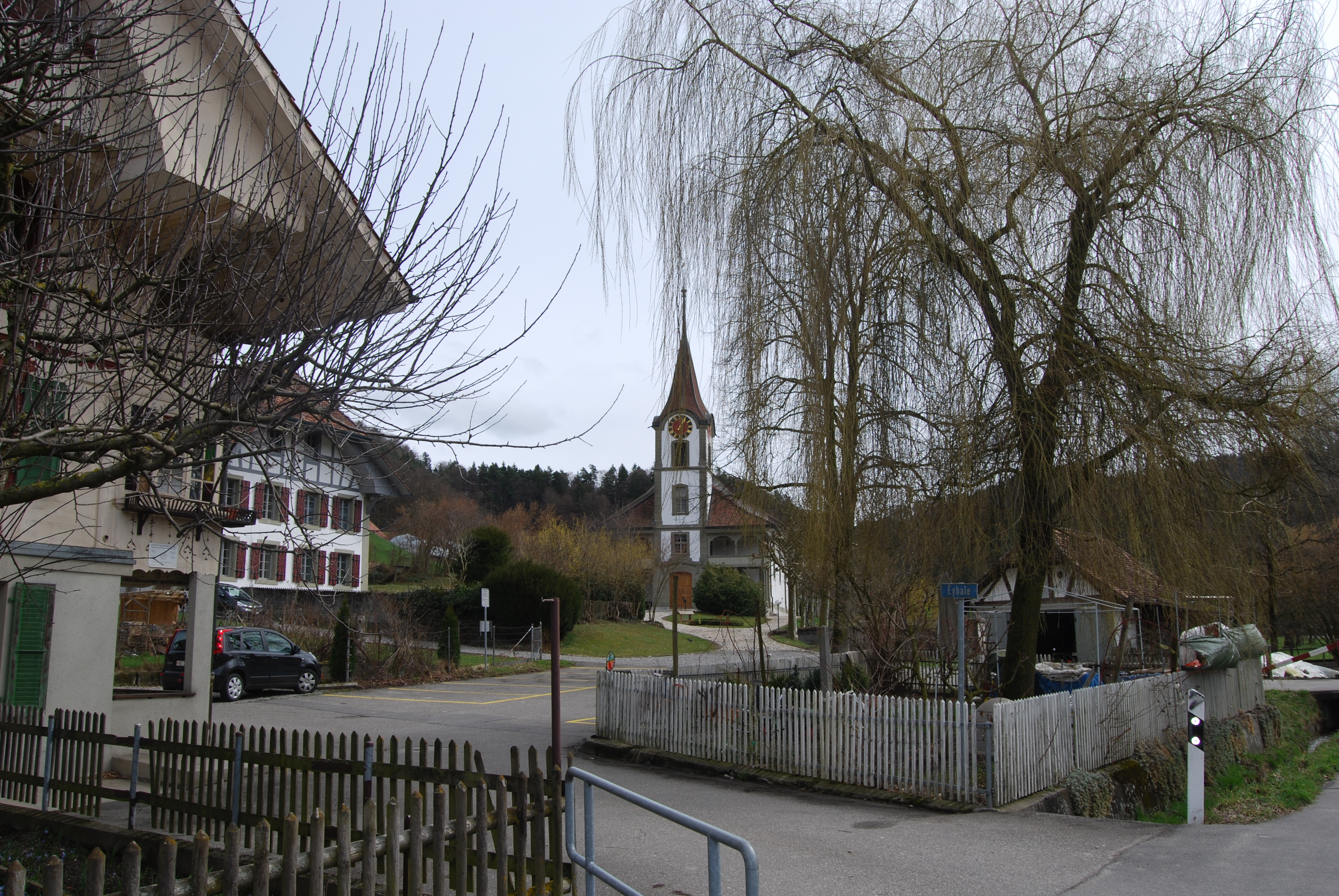
Church and village of Krauchthal

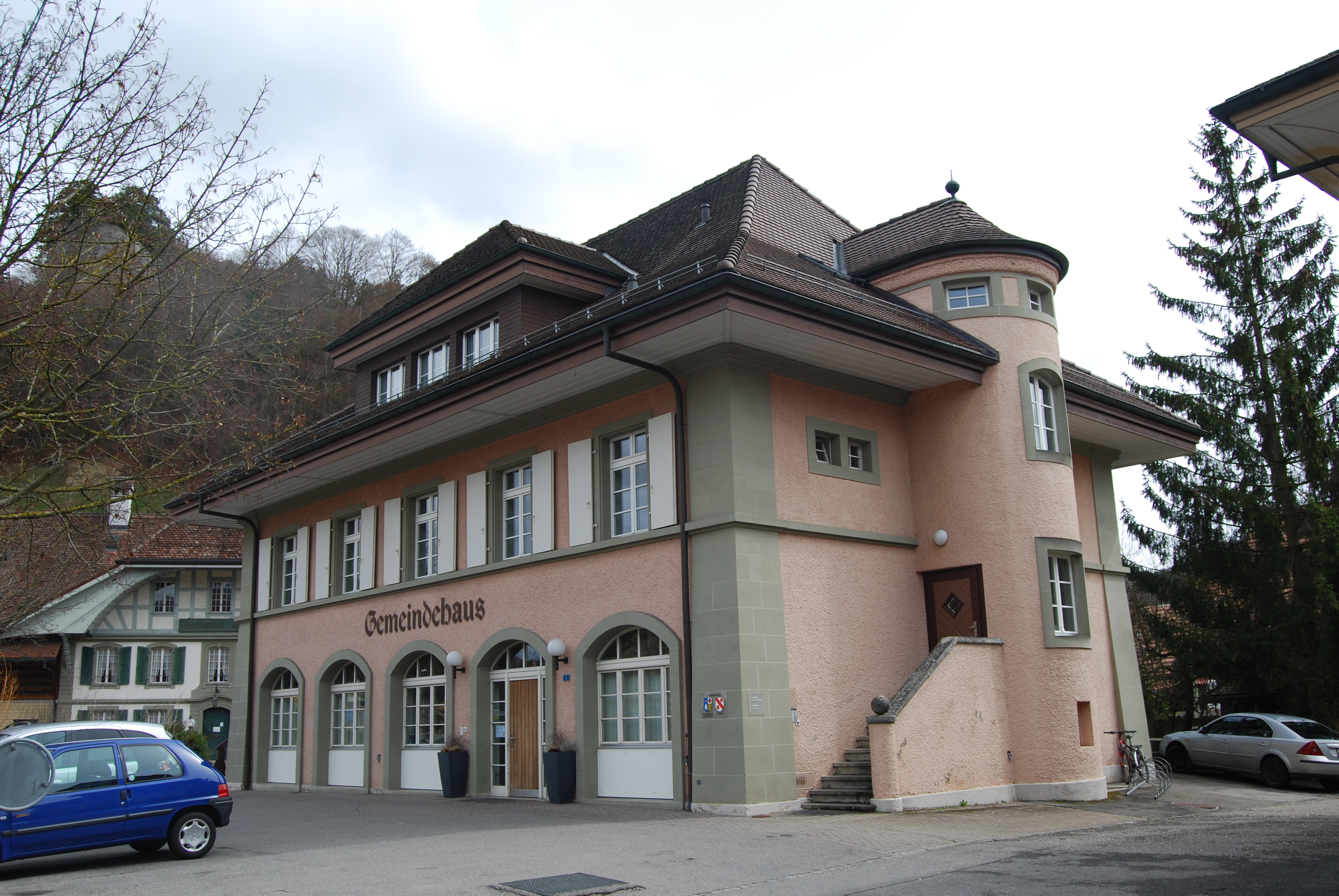
Municipal administration of Krauchthal

Krauchthal has a population (as of December 2020) of 2,384. As of 2010, 3.8% of the population are resident foreign nationals. Over the last 10 years (2000-2010) the population has changed at a rate of 0%. Migration accounted for -2.7%, while births and deaths accounted for 2.4%.

Most of the population (as of 2000) speaks German (2,265 or 91.3%) as their first language, Albanian is the second most common (78 or 3.1%) and French is the third (21 or 0.8%). There are 11 people who speak Italian.

As of 2008, the population was 51.2% male and 48.8% female. The population was made up of 1,128 Swiss men (49.0% of the population) and 50 (2.2%) non-Swiss men. There were 1,085 Swiss women (47.2%) and 38 (1.7%) non-Swiss women. Of the population in the municipality, 726 or about 29.3% were born in Krauchthal and lived there in 2000. There were 1,107 or 44.6% who were born in the same canton, while 299 or 12.1% were born somewhere else in Switzerland, and 267 or 10.8% were born outside of Switzerland.

As of 2010, children and teenagers (0–19 years old) make up 22.6% of the population, while adults (20–64 years old) make up 62.6% and seniors (over 64 years old) make up 14.7%.

As of 2000, there were 1,085 people who were single and never married in the municipality. There were 1,205 married individuals, 108 widows or widowers and 82 individuals who are divorced.

As of 2000, there were 219 households that consist of only one person and 83 households with five or more people. In 2000, a total of 853 apartments (93.8% of the total) were permanently occupied, while 32 apartments (3.5%) were seasonally occupied and 24 apartments (2.6%) were empty. As of 2010, the construction rate of new housing units was 1.3 new units per 1000 residents. The vacancy rate for the municipality, in 2011, was 0.3%.

The historical population is given in the following chart:

== Politics ==
In the 2011 federal election the most popular party was the Swiss People's Party (SVP) which received 37% of the vote. The next three most popular parties were the Conservative Democratic Party (BDP) (19%), the Social Democratic Party (SP) (16.1%) and the FDP.The Liberals (7.6%). In the federal election, a total of 913 votes were cast, and the voter turnout was 50.0%.

== Economy ==
As of 2011, Krauchthal had an unemployment rate of 1.46%. As of 2008, there were a total of 569 people employed in the municipality. Of these, there were 169 people employed in the primary economic sector and about 55 businesses involved in this sector. 166 people were employed in the secondary sector and there were 27 businesses in this sector. 234 people were employed in the tertiary sector, with 36 businesses in this sector.

In 2008 there were a total of 465 full-time equivalent jobs. The number of jobs in the primary sector was 112, of which 94 were in agriculture and 19 were in forestry or lumber production. The number of jobs in the secondary sector was 151 of which 88 or (58.3%) were in manufacturing and 52 (34.4%) were in construction. The number of jobs in the tertiary sector was 202. In the tertiary sector; 34 or 16.8% were in wholesale or retail sales or the repair of motor vehicles, 14 or 6.9% were in the movement and storage of goods, 17 or 8.4% were in a hotel or restaurant, 6 or 3.0% were technical professionals or scientists, 18 or 8.9% were in education and 1 was in health care.

In 2000, there were 201 workers who commuted into the municipality and 1,071 workers who commuted away. The municipality is a net exporter of workers, with about 5.3 workers leaving the municipality for every one entering. Of the working population, 11.3% used public transportation to get to work, and 62.1% used a private car.

== Religion ==
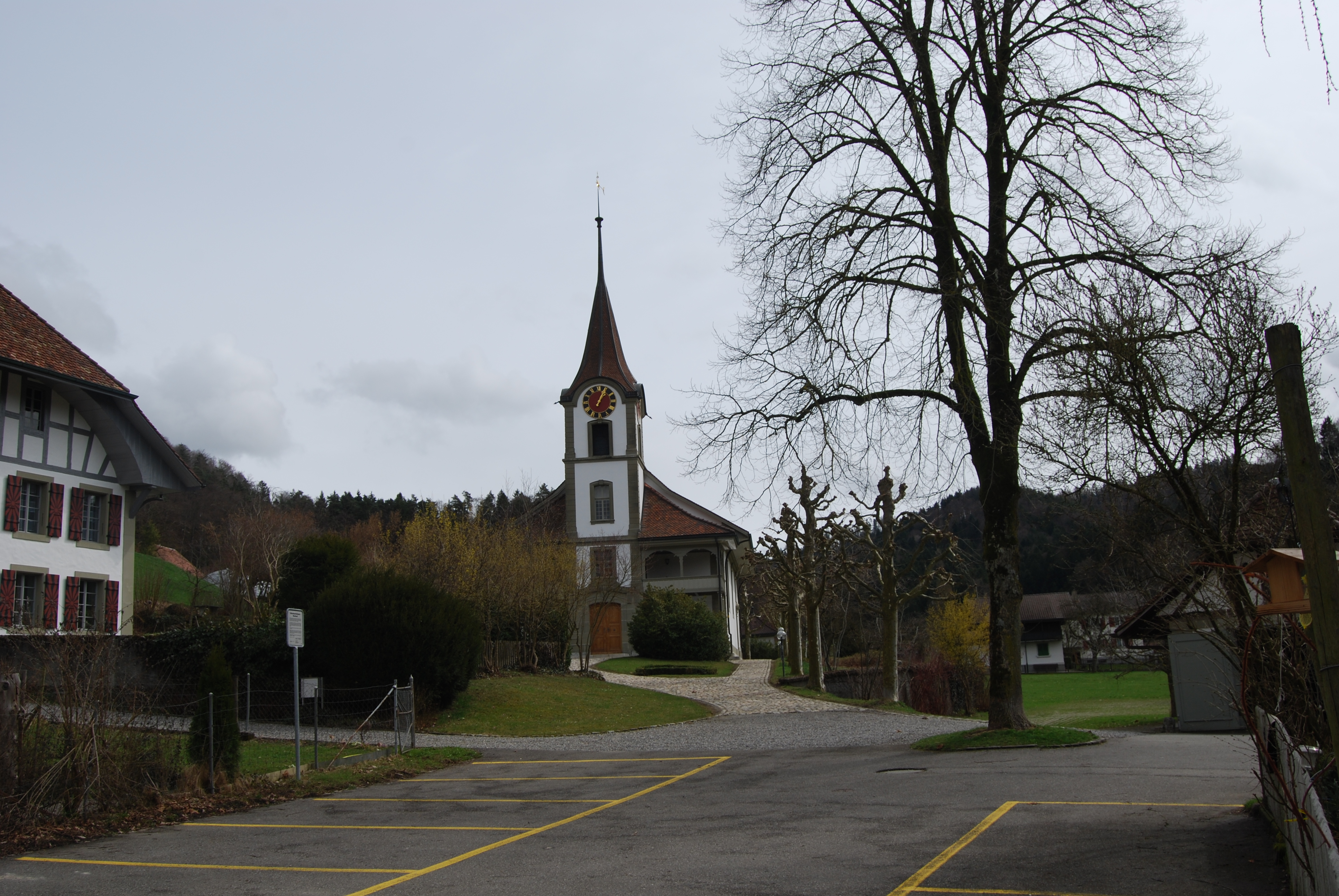
Krauchthal village church

From the 2000 census, 210 or 8.5% were Roman Catholic, while 1,825 or 73.6% belonged to the Swiss Reformed Church. Of the rest of the population, there were 19 members of an Orthodox church (or about 0.77% of the population), and there were 120 individuals (or about 4.84% of the population) who belonged to another Christian church. There were 114 (or about 4.60% of the population) who were Islamic. There were 4 individuals who were Buddhist and 12 individuals who were Hindu. 146 (or about 5.89% of the population) belonged to no church, are agnostic or atheist, and 89 individuals (or about 3.59% of the population) did not answer the question.

== Education ==
In Krauchthal about 1,057 or (42.6%) of the population have completed non-mandatory upper secondary education, and 283 or (11.4%) have completed additional higher education (either university or a Fachhochschule). Of the 283 who completed tertiary schooling, 71.0% were Swiss men, 20.8% were Swiss women, 6.0% were non-Swiss men and 2.1% were non-Swiss women.

The Canton of Bern school system provides one year of non-obligatory Kindergarten, followed by six years of Primary school. This is followed by three years of obligatory lower Secondary school where the students are separated according to ability and aptitude. Following the lower Secondary students may attend additional schooling or they may enter an apprenticeship.

During the 2010-11 school year, there were a total of 181 students attending classes in Krauchthal. There were 2 kindergarten classes with a total of 40 students in the municipality. Of the kindergarten students, 15.0% have a different mother language than the classroom language. The municipality had 8 primary classes and 141 students. Of the primary students, 2.8% were permanent or temporary residents of Switzerland (not citizens) and 7.1% have a different mother language than the classroom language.

As of 2000, there were 6 students in Krauchthal who came from another municipality, while 132 residents attended schools outside the municipality.
