= Bäriswil, Bern =

Bäriswil
- Municipality
- Flag Coat of arms
- Location of Bäriswil
- Location within Switzerland Location within Canton of Bern
- Coordinates: 47°1′N 7°32′E
- Country: Switzerland
- Canton: Bern
- District: Bern-Mittelland

Government
  - Executive: Gemeinderat with 5 members
  - Mayor: Gemeindepräsident; Roger Sauter (as of 2026)

Area
  - Total: 2.800 km^{2} (1.081 sq mi)
- Elevation: 546 m (1,791 ft)

Population (December 2020)
  - Total: 1,071
  - Density: 382.5/km^{2} (990.7/sq mi)
- Time zone: UTC+01:00 (CET)
  - Summer (DST): UTC+02:00 (CEST)
- Postal code: 3323
- SFOS number: 403
- ISO 3166 code: CH-BE
- Surrounded by: Hindelbank, Krauchthal, Mattstetten
- Website: www.baeriswil.ch

Bäriswil is a municipality in the district of Bern-Mittelland in the canton of Bern in Switzerland.

== History ==
Bäriswil is first mentioned in 861 as Perolteswilare when the Abbey of St. Gall acquired land and farms in Bäriswil. In 1310 it was mentioned as Berolswile.

Hallstatt era grave mounds have been discovered at Mittelberg and Kriegsholz.

Starting in the 14th century, various Bernese patrician families owned the village and surrounding lands. In 1720, Hieronymus of Erlach acquired the village and merged it into the Herrschaft of Hindelbank.

The village has remained mostly agricultural. During the 18th century it became slightly industrialized with a pottery factory and a sanding or cutting wheel plant. Starting in the 1960s it developed into a commuter town for the city of Bern. Today, the economy is dominated by small businesses and commuters.

== Geography ==
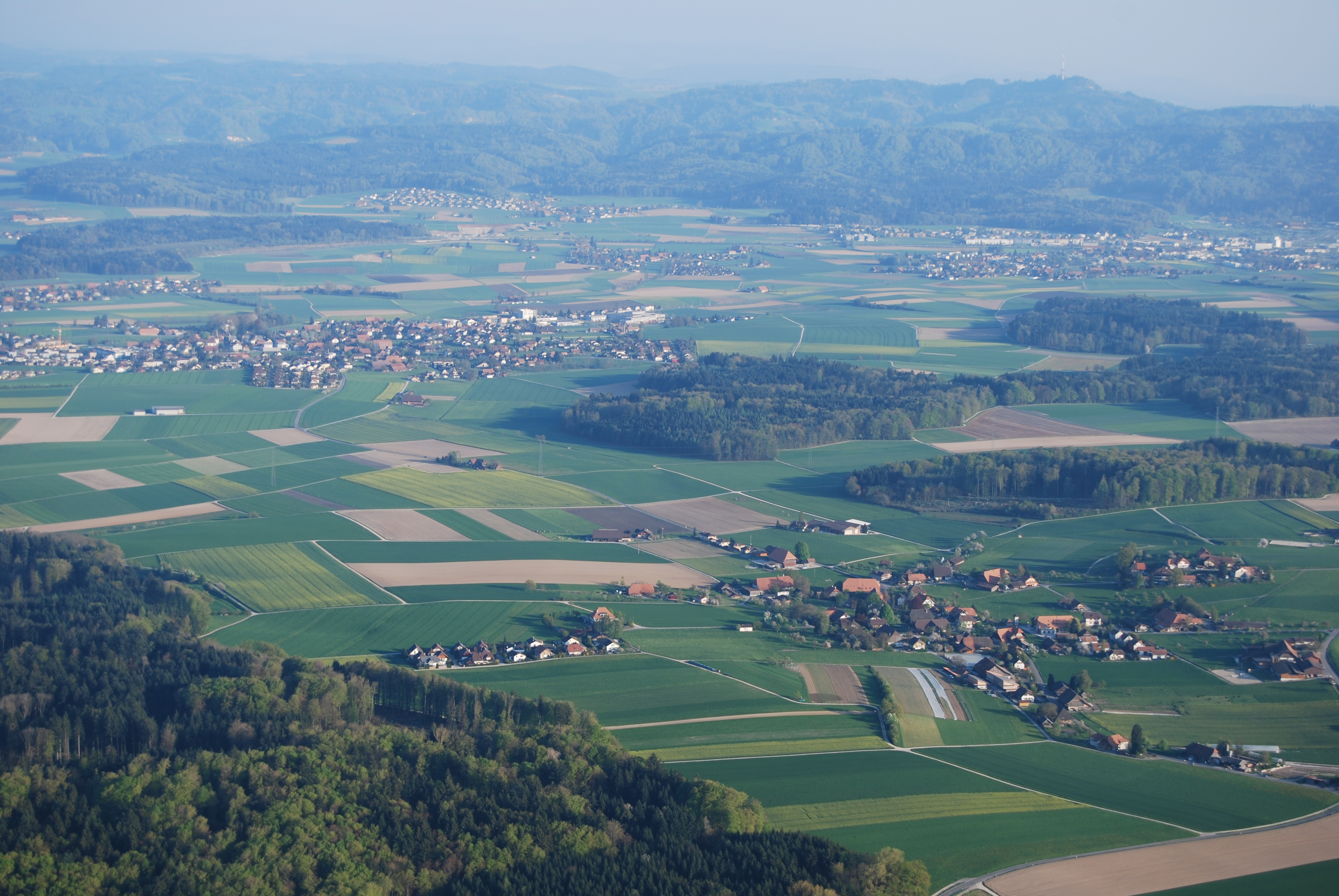
Aerial view of the land and villages around Bäriswil. Bäriswil is visible in the left-center background

Bäriswil has an area of 2.73 km^{2} (1.05 sq mi). Of this area, 1.27 km^{2} (0.49 mi^{2}) or 46.5% is used for agricultural purposes, while 1.15 km^{2} (0.44 mi^{2}) or 42.1% is forested. Of the rest of the land, 0.33 km^{2} (0.13 mi^{2}) or 12.1% is settled (buildings or roads) and 0.02 km^{2} (4.9 acres) or 0.7% is unproductive land.

Aerial view by Walter Mittelholzer (1925)

Of the built up area, housing and buildings made up 7.3% and transportation infrastructure made up 3.7%. Out of the forested land, all of the forested land area is covered with heavy forests. Of the agricultural land, 34.8% is used for growing crops and 8.4% is pastures, while 3.3% is used for orchards or vine crops.

It consists of the village of Bäriswil and several scattered farm houses.

On 31 December 2009 Amtsbezirk Burgdorf, the municipality's former district, was dissolved. On the following day, 1 January 2010, it joined the newly created Verwaltungskreis Bern-Mittelland.

== Coat of arms ==
The blazon of the municipal coat of arms is Argent three Pales Gules overall a Bear rampant Sable langued and viriled of the second. The bear (German: Bär) makes this an example of canting arms.

== Demographics ==
Bäriswil has a population (as of December 2020) of 1,071. As of 2010, 6.0% of the population are resident foreign nationals. Over the last 10 years (2000-2010) the population has changed at a rate of -2.5%. Migration accounted for -3.1%, while births and deaths accounted for 0.5%.

Most of the population (as of 2000) speaks German (996 or 97.0%) as their first language, French is the second most common (10 or 1.0%) and Dutch is the third (7 or 0.7%). There are 5 people who speak Italian.

As of 2008, the population was 50.4% male and 49.6% female. The population was made up of 467 Swiss men (46.9% of the population) and 34 (3.4%) non-Swiss men. There were 468 Swiss women (47.0%) and 26 (2.6%) non-Swiss women. Of the population in the municipality, 241 or about 23.5% were born in Bäriswil and lived there in 2000. There were 472 or 46.0% who were born in the same canton, while 217 or 21.1% were born somewhere else in Switzerland, and 56 or 5.5% were born outside of Switzerland.

As of 2010, children and teenagers (0–19 years old) make up 19.2% of the population, while adults (20–64 years old) make up 66% and seniors (over 64 years old) make up 14.8%.

As of 2000, there were 424 people who were single and never married in the municipality. There were 527 married individuals, 34 widows or widowers and 42 individuals who are divorced.

As of 2000, there were 67 households that consist of only one person and 28 households with five or more people. In 2000, a total of 376 apartments (91.0% of the total) were permanently occupied, while 16 apartments (3.9%) were seasonally occupied and 21 apartments (5.1%) were empty. As of 2010, the construction rate of new housing units was 3 new units per 1000 residents. The vacancy rate for the municipality, in 2011, was 0.68%.

The historical population is given in the following chart:

== Politics ==
In the 2011 federal election the most popular party was the SVP which received 29.6% of the vote. The next three most popular parties were the BDP Party (21.1%), the SPS (16.2%) and the Green Party (9.2%). In the federal election, a total of 440 votes were cast, and the voter turnout was 55.1%.

== Economy ==
As of 2011, Bäriswil had an unemployment rate of 1%. As of 2008, there were a total of 152 people employed in the municipality. Of these, there were 18 people employed in the primary economic sector and about 8 businesses involved in this sector. 22 people were employed in the secondary sector and there were 8 businesses in this sector. 112 people were employed in the tertiary sector, with 18 businesses in this sector.

In 2008 there were a total of 106 full-time equivalent jobs. The number of jobs in the primary sector was 10, all of which were in agriculture. The number of jobs in the secondary sector was 20 of which 16 were in manufacturing and 4 were in construction. The number of jobs in the tertiary sector was 76. In the tertiary sector; 12 or 15.8% were in wholesale or retail sales or the repair of motor vehicles, 13 or 17.1% were in the movement and storage of goods, 9 or 11.8% were in a hotel or restaurant, 1 was in the information industry, 2 or 2.6% were technical professionals or scientists, 6 or 7.9% were in education and 29 or 38.2% were in health care.

In 2000, there were 55 workers who commuted into the municipality and 486 workers who commuted away. The municipality is a net exporter of workers, with about 8.8 workers leaving the municipality for every one entering. Of the working population, 26.4% used public transportation to get to work, and 55.7% used a private car.

== Religion ==
From the 2000 census, 107 or 10.4% were Roman Catholic, while 791 or 77.0% belonged to the Swiss Reformed Church. Of the rest of the population, there was 1 member of an Orthodox church, there were 4 individuals (or about 0.39% of the population) who belonged to the Christian Catholic Church, and there were 51 individuals (or about 4.97% of the population) who belonged to another Christian church. There were 4 (or about 0.39% of the population) who were Islamic. There were 2 individuals who belonged to another church. 73 (or about 7.11% of the population) belonged to no church, are agnostic or atheist, and 19 individuals (or about 1.85% of the population) did not answer the question.

== Education ==
In Bäriswil about 473 or (46.1%) of the population have completed non-mandatory upper secondary education, and 132 or (12.9%) have completed additional higher education (either university or a Fachhochschule). Of the 132 who completed tertiary schooling, 74.2% were Swiss men, 19.7% were Swiss women and 3.8% were non-Swiss women.

The Canton of Bern school system provides one year of non-obligatory Kindergarten, followed by six years of Primary school. This is followed by three years of obligatory lower Secondary school where the students are separated according to ability and aptitude. Following the lower Secondary students may attend additional schooling or they may enter an apprenticeship.

During the 2009-10 school year, there were a total of 68 students attending classes in Bäriswil. There was one kindergarten class with a total of 18 students in the municipality. Of the kindergarten students, and 5.6% have a different mother language than the classroom language. The municipality had 3 primary classes and 50 students. Of the primary students, 12.0% were permanent or temporary residents of Switzerland (not citizens) and 8.0% have a different mother language than the classroom language.

As of 2000, there were 59 students from Bäriswil who attended schools outside the municipality.
