= Urtene =

River in Switzerland

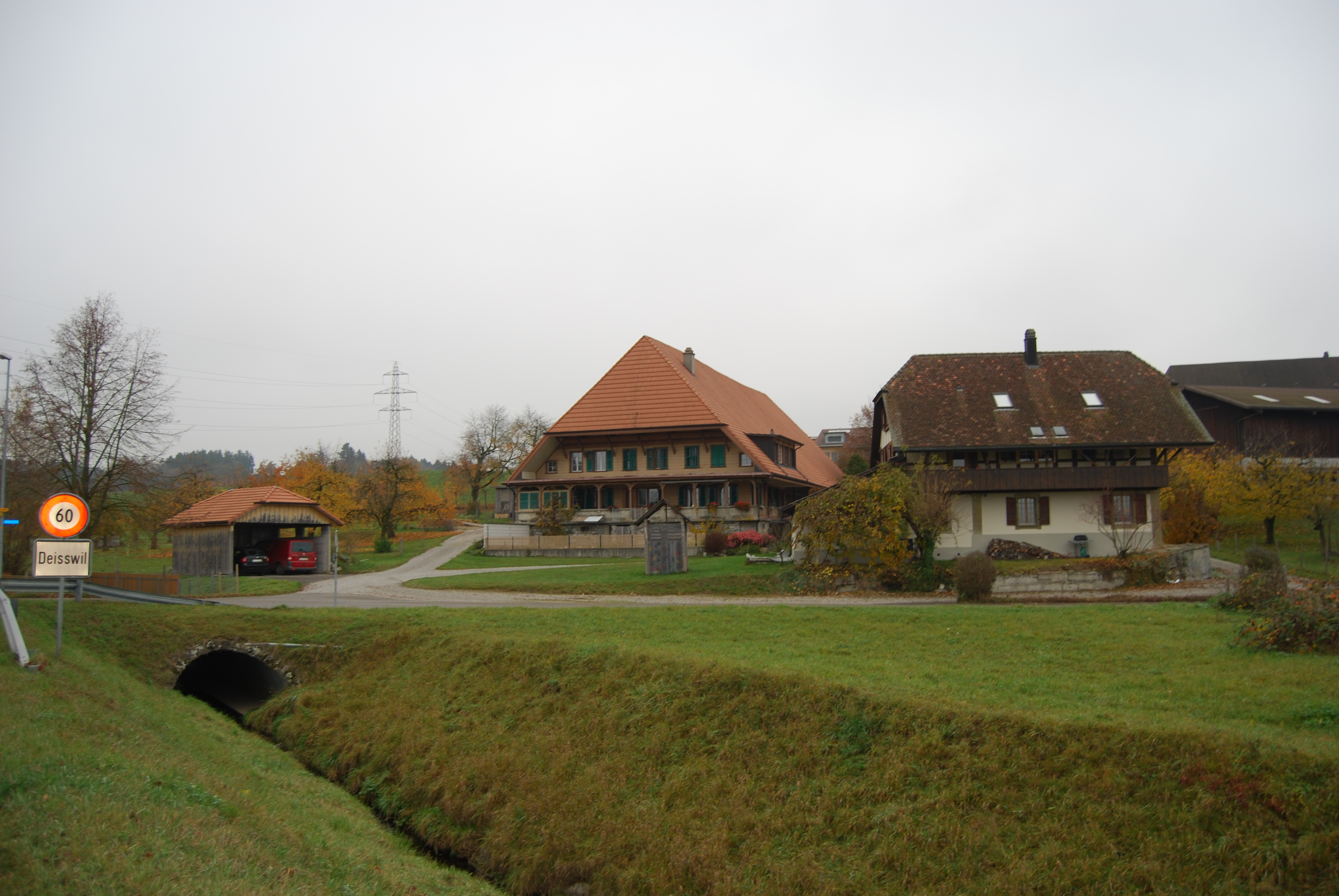
- Woolibach, a source of the Urtene near the village of Deisswil

Location
- Country: Switzerland
- State: Bern

Physical characteristics
- Source: A number of small streams in the Moossee Valley
  - location: Bern-Mittelland, Canton of Bern
  - coordinates: 47°1′49″N 7°26′44″E
- Mouth: Emme
  - location: below the Hof settlement between Bätterkinden and Schalunen, Bern-Mittelland, Canton of Bern, Switzerland
  - coordinates: 47°7′10″N 7°32′6″E
- Discharge
  - average: 2.03 m^{3}/s (72 cu ft/s)
  - minimum: 1.36 m^{3}/s (48 cu ft/s)
  - maximum: 2.81 m^{3}/s (99 cu ft/s)

Basin features
- Progression: Emme→ Aare→ Rhine→ North Sea

The Urtene, also called the Urtenenbach is a river in the Swiss Canton of Bern. It is an 18 km (11 mi) long tributary of the river Emme. It drains a portion of the central Bernese Midland and belongs to the catchment area of the Rhine. The Drainage basin of Urtene is about 96 km^{2} (37 sq mi). The yearly average flow at the mouth of the river is 2.03 m^{3}/s (72 cu ft/s).
