= Pauline Schwarz =

Swiss victim of coercive welfare measures

- Born: 1918; Buchs
- Died: 1982 (aged 63–64); Hergiswil bei Willisau
- Occupations: Domestic servant, farmer

Pauline Schwarz (1918 – 1982) was a Swiss domestic servant and farmer who was a convicted offender and a victim of Switzerland's coercive welfare measures. "Pauline Schwarz" is a pseudonym; her name was anonymized for archival-law reasons in the biography devoted to her in 2020.

== Life ==
The youngest of four children, Schwarz grew up in poverty in the St. Gallen Rhine Valley. Her father, a farmhand who had left Württemberg in 1900, had married a farmer's daughter from Schönenberg in 1909, and having fallen into poverty, the family could not afford the high costs of naturalization. Her mother died early. In 1941 her brother was expelled from Switzerland to Nazi Germany for minor offenses; condemned as a Volksschädling ("parasite of the people"), he died soon afterward in the Bruchsal house of correction near Mannheim.

From the age of 15, Schwarz had to support herself, working as a kitchen girl and domestic servant for private households, inns, and farms. First convicted at the age of 20 to a two-week prison sentence for a small theft, she was expelled from the canton of Thurgau. She subsequently fell into debt and, left without resources, returned to petty offending, begging small sums of money, food, or clothing under a false identity, which led to a further imprisonment. In 1939 she married a widowed farmer, much older than her and violent. At his request, their child was placed in foster care in Ticino, and Schwarz was interned by police order in 1941 at the Burghölzli cantonal psychiatric clinic. Passing over the domestic violence she had suffered and the removal of her child, the psychiatric assessment labeled her a "chronic cheat" and "swindler" and attributed to her "diminished criminal responsibility." After a further pregnancy and the birth of another child, she successfully opposed the sterilization demanded by the authorities, but could not prevent the placement of her newborn outside the family.

At the end of a four-month prison sentence for various thefts, Schwarz, who had by then divorced, was expelled in 1942 by the Zurich authorities to her home commune for "serious and repeated offenses." In 1943 she was the subject of a further psychiatric assessment at the Rosegg clinic, after which, by decision of the Solothurn district court, she was placed under guardianship under articles 369 and 370 of the Civil Code. At the same time, following the directives of the Solothurn cantonal government and notwithstanding her appeal, she was subjected by her home commune to a two-year administrative internment in the forced-labor establishment of Schachen at Deitingen.

During the 1940s she again committed thefts and frauds and was repeatedly sentenced to prison. In 1951 an assessment at the Königsfelden psychiatric hospital recommended her internment for an indefinite period as a "habitual offender" under article 42 of the Swiss Criminal Code, and she spent three years at the Lenzburg cantonal penitentiary. In 1963 she was sentenced to 14 months' imprisonment at the Hindelbank women's prison for fraud and falsification of documents, and was released early for good conduct. She then worked as a domestic servant and, after remarrying, as a farmer.

Between prisons, psychiatric clinics, and forced-labor establishments, Schwarz continually sought ways to lead a normal life. Married five times, she had five children: four were placed outside the family against her will, and the fifth was forcibly placed for adoption, and only after a long battle was she able to obtain custody of her youngest daughter. Her biography illustrates the role played by the authorities, the justice system, and psychiatry in the life of a woman who, trapped by poverty and domestic violence, committed offenses in her daily struggle to survive, and her case exemplifies the condemnation of female delinquency within a patriarchal view of gender roles.

== Bibliography ==
- Germann, Urs (2003). "Die 'Unschädlichmachung Gemeingefährlicher'. Anfänge und Entwicklung des psychiatrischen Massnahmenvollzugs im Kanton Bern zwischen 1850 und 1920". In Traverse, 10/1, pp. 32–46.
- Huonker, Thomas (2003). Diagnose: "moralisch defekt". Kastration, Sterilisation und Rassenhygiene im Dienst der Schweizer Sozialpolitik und Psychiatrie 1890–1970.
- Germann, Urs (2004). Psychiatrie und Strafjustiz. Entstehung, Praxis und Ausdifferenzierung der forensischen Psychiatrie in der deutschsprachigen Schweiz 1850–1950.
- Meier, Marietta; Bernet, Brigitta; et al. (2007). Zwang zur Ordnung. Psychiatrie im Kanton Zürich, 1870–1970.
- Herger, Lisbeth (2020). "moralisch defekt". Pauline Schwarz zwischen Psychiatrie und Gefängnis.
