= Gambling in Switzerland =

Overview of gambling in Switzerland

Federal Gambling Act
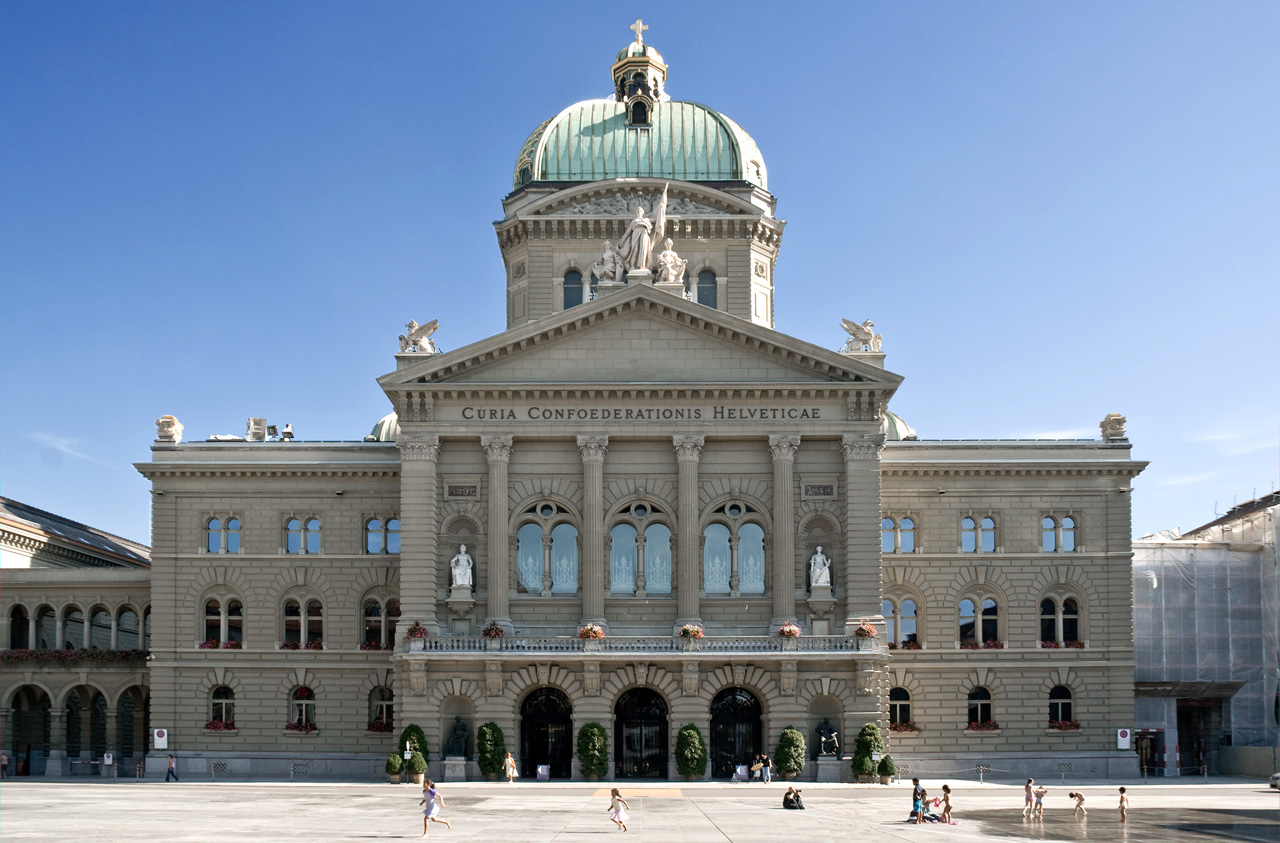

Federal Assembly of Switzerland
- Long title: (SR 935.51)
- Territorial extent: Switzerland
- Enacted by: Federal Assembly of Switzerland
- Enacted: 29 September 2017
- Commenced: 1 January 2019

Repeals
- Federal Act of June 8, 1923, on Lotteries and Professional Betting
- Status: Current legislation

Gambling in Switzerland is regulated by federal and cantonal authorities under the Federal Gambling Act, (Note: German: Geldspielgesetz, BGS; French: Loi fédérale sur les jeux d'argent, LJAr; Italian: Legge federale sui giochi in denaro, LGD) which entered into force on January 1, 2019. The legislation was approved by 73% of Swiss voters and established a comprehensive framework governing casino games, large-scale games including lotteries and sports betting, and small-scale games.

== Regulatory framework ==
Switzerland's gambling sector is supervised by multiple authorities depending on the type of gaming activity. The Federal Gaming Board (FGB) oversees casino operations, both land-based and online, while the intercantonal authority Gespa regulates large-scale games such as lotteries, sports betting, and skill games. Small-scale games including local sports betting, small lotteries, and small poker tournaments fall under cantonal jurisdiction.

The Federal Gambling Act defines gambling as games that offer a monetary gain or other financial advantage in exchange for a stake or legal transaction. All gambling operators must obtain appropriate licenses or concessions, which are valid only within Switzerland.

== Casino gambling ==
=== Land-based casinos ===
Switzerland operates 20 land-based casinos under a concession system managed by the Federal Council. Concessions are granted for 20-year periods, with the most recent distribution occurring on November 29, 2023, covering the period from 2025 to 2044.

Casinos are classified into two categories:

- Type A concessions, held by nine establishments including those in Baden, Basel, Lucerne, and Zürich, permit unlimited stakes and must direct 100% of gaming tax revenue to the federal old-age and survivors' insurance.
- Type B concessions, held by eleven casinos, restrict maximum stakes to 25 francs for automated games, and their host cantons may levy a cantonal tax on gross gaming revenue from land-based operations, up to 40% of the federal tax amount.

A new casino is scheduled to open in Prilly, Vaud in 2026

=== Online casinos ===
Since January 1, 2019, Swiss land-based casinos may apply for concession extensions to operate online gaming platforms. The Federal Council grants these extensions upon FGB recommendation. As of November 2025, nine casinos operate online platforms, with Casino Baden launching the first in July 2019, followed by Casino Lucerne and others.

=== Taxation ===
The Confederation levies a tax on gross gaming revenue (the difference between player stakes and payouts) to fund the old-age, survivors', and disability insurance systems. For land-based operations, the base rate is 40% on gross gaming revenue up to 10 million francs, then progressively increases by 0.5% per additional million francs to a maximum of 80%. For online casino games, the base rate is 20% on revenue up to 3 million francs, rising in five steps to a maximum of 80%.

== List of casinos ==
Casino name	Location	Canton	Type	Opening year	With online casino	Gross Gaming Revenue (mil. CHF, 2024)
Casino Baden	Baden	Aargau	A		Yes	98.5
Casino Basel	Basel	Basel-Stadt	A		Yes	63.4
Casino Bern	Bern	Bern	A		Yes	46.1
Casino Luzern	Lucerne	Lucerne	A		Yes	124.6
Casino Zürich	Zürich	Zürich	A		No	60.3
Casino Lugano	Lugano	Ticino	A		Yes	41.1
Casino Montreux	Montreux	Vaud	A		Yes	54.3
Casino Winterthur	Winterthur	Zürich	A	2025	No	—
Casino Prilly	Prilly	Vaud	A	2026 (planned)	No	—
Casino Bad Ragaz	Bad Ragaz	St. Gallen	B		No	12.4
Casino Courrendlin	Courrendlin	Jura	B		No	9.3
Casino Crans-Montana	Crans-Montana	Valais	B		No	12.4
Casino Davos	Davos	Grisons	B		Yes	31.8
Casino Granges-Paccot	Granges-Paccot	Fribourg	B		No	11.7
Casino Interlaken	Interlaken	Bern	B		Yes	24.0
Casino Locarno	Locarno	Ticino	B		No	16.2
Casino Mendrisio	Mendrisio	Ticino	B		Yes	71.6
Casino Meyrin	Meyrin	Geneva	B		Yes	69.2
Casino Neuchâtel	Neuchâtel	Neuchâtel	B		No	18.3
Casino Pfäffikon	Pfäffikon	Schwyz	B		Yes	94.4
Casino St. Gallen	St. Gallen	St. Gallen	B		No	24.9

== Market trends ==
The Swiss casino sector has experienced significant changes since the COVID-19 pandemic. While the industry has not returned to pre-2019 revenue levels, gross gaming revenue from land-based operations declined between 2022 and 2024.

Online gaming revenue has shown consistent growth following initial expansion during pandemic-era restrictions. According to Addiction Switzerland, land-based gaming activities declined by 5.8% in 2024 while online activities increased by 8.5%.

Some operators have withdrawn from online gaming. Groupe Barrière discontinued its online operations in 2025 after launching in 2021, citing significant market contraction that made continuation unviable in the short term. Casino Basel similarly ceased online operations, noting that casinos launching online platforms before COVID-19 captured substantial market share, and that many Swiss players use foreign sites.

== Problem gambling and player protection ==
=== Prevalence ===
Problem gambling has increased in Switzerland according to the Swiss Health Survey. The proportion of the population exhibiting excessive gambling behavior rose from 3.1% in 2017 to 4.3% in 2022, representing approximately 308,000 people. The rate of pathological gambling more than doubled from 0.2% to 0.5% during the same period. The increase is particularly pronounced among young people.

=== Social protection measures ===
Casinos and large-scale game operators must implement social protection programs addressing information provision, early identification of at-risk players, player self-control mechanisms, game limitations, exclusion measures, and staff training. They must provide comprehensive information about gambling risks, self-assessment questionnaires, information on self-control and exclusion options, and contact details for counseling services and support groups.

Operators may request financial documentation to verify that gambling behavior is financially sustainable. If a player fails to provide required documents within the specified timeframe, or if there are indications that gambling is not financially viable, operators must impose a gaming exclusion.

=== Exclusion system ===
Switzerland operates a centralized exclusion register for individuals banned from gambling due to addiction risk, over-indebtedness, or failure to meet financial obligations. All gambling operators who issue exclusions register excluded persons in this central database. Once registered, the exclusion applies throughout Switzerland and, since January 7, 2025, also in Liechtenstein. Excluded individuals are barred from casino games (both land-based and online) and large-scale online games such as lotteries.

In 2024, 18,216 new exclusions were registered. Approximately 40% (7,480) were voluntary self-exclusions. Half (9,200) resulted from failure to provide financial documentation.

Exclusions may be imposed by casino operators or requested voluntarily. They are not time-limited but can be lifted when the grounds for exclusion no longer exist, with voluntary exclusions removable no earlier than three months after registration.

While Swiss casinos exclude approximately 100,000 players, these individuals remain free to gamble in neighboring countries except Liechtenstein. Swiss politicians and prevention organizations have called for extending exclusion agreements to France, Austria, Germany, and Italy. Discussions with France began in 2024, though differences in legal frameworks present challenges, as French exclusions operate on a voluntary basis.

== Illegal online gambling ==
The Federal Gambling Act requires internet service providers to block access to unauthorized online gambling sites. The FGB and Gespa maintain and update lists of blocked sites within their respective jurisdictions, which are published through a reference in the Federal Gazette, and employ DNS blocking.

Implementation of the blocking system has faced criticism. The FGB updates its blocking list quarterly while Swiss casinos report new illegal sites monthly. As of mid-2025, approximately 2,300 illegal sites appeared on the blocking list, while an estimated 8,000 such sites operate globally.

In one documented case, the FGB took nine months to verify and block 80 sites operated by a Malta-based company after receiving a complaint from a recovering gambling addict. The FCG attributes processing delays to required publication in the Federal Gazette, coordination with internet service providers, and technical and administrative procedures, particularly when many domains must be processed simultaneously.

== Other forms of gambling ==
=== Poker tournaments ===
Small poker tournaments are permitted outside casinos under specific conditions established by the Federal Gambling Act. These tournaments require cantonal authorization and are classified as small-scale games. Federal law limits initial stakes and restricts the number of tournaments per day and location.

Large poker tournaments with high stakes and substantial prizes are restricted to the 20 licensed Swiss casinos and may be conducted both in-person and online.

=== Lotteries and sports betting ===
Small-scale lotteries and local sports betting fall under cantonal jurisdiction.
