= Counter-beam lighting =

Principle of road tunnel lighting

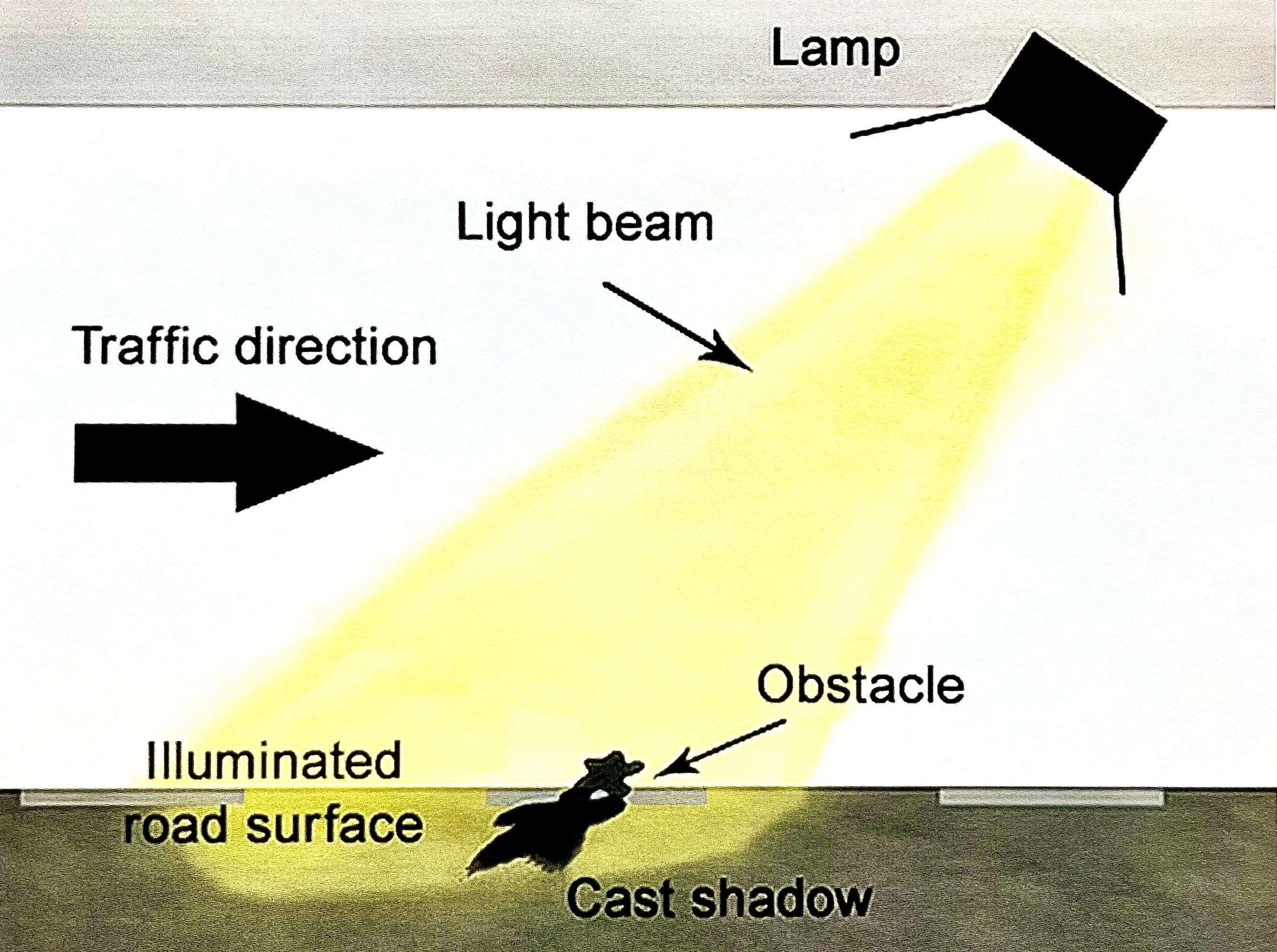
Light beam from road tunnel fixture inclined towards approaching vehicle such that contrast is enhanced of obstacle on road

Counter-beam lighting (German: Gegenstrahlbeleuchtung) is a type of road lighting used mainly in road tunnels, providing best visibility of obstacles on the lane, and thus traffic safety, while reducing light-energy cost. It is mostly installed at road tunnel entrances (transition zone) to counteract the few seconds of lower visibility while the eye adapts to new lighting conditions, which is especially impactful during sunshine and at high entry speeds. With conventional lighting technology, very high luminances with correspondingly high energy costs would have to be provided in these areas to make obstacles on the roadway sufficiently visible.

== Principle of counter-beam lighting ==
The light from the lamps does not shine perpendicularly down onto the roadway, but is angled towards oncoming vehicles. With a carefully chosen angle of inclination and suitable lighting fixtures, visibility is improved without dazzling the driver. The roadway acts as a mirror that scatters the light toward the vehicle. Since the road surface is a poor mirror (gray surface), the driver is not blinded, but perceives the road as a bright surface. Furthermore, any obstacle on the roadway casts a larger shadow on the road surface with this oblique incidence of light. This shadow, and the surface of the obstacle which is backlit, have a high contrast to the bright roadway. The black surface seen is larger than the obstacle itself, making it easier to perceive the hazard. With perpendicular light incidence, brighter, more expensive lamps with much higher energy requirements and greater maintenance overhead would have to be used to achieve equivalent visibility of obstacles. Therefore, counter-beam lighting can be considered an environmentally friendly contribution to road safety.

== History ==
Contrast lighting traces its origins to the work of Ing. W. Ernst Freiburghaus (* 1921, Berne, Switzerland, † 2006, Berne, Switzerland), who was commissioned by BKW (Bernische Kraftwerke AG, today BKW Energie), Berne, Switzerland, to prepare theoretical work and practical installations (Worblaufen underpass, Bern, Switzerland) in the early 1960s. The theoretical findings were further developed and published by the Swiss Federal Office of Metrology, today Federal Institute of Metrology, Berne, Switzerland (without crediting the author). On the basis of his developments, BKW requested by letter of February 24, 1968, the inclusion of counter-beam lighting (then called BKW system with oblique beam [System BKW mit Schrägstrahlung]) in the Guidelines for Public Lighting, 2nd part, Road Tunnels - and Underpasses, of the Swiss Lighting Commission, but this was rejected. Various Swiss highway tunnels have since been equipped with this lighting system (in the 1970s, for example, the Allmend Tunnel of the motorway [Autobahn] A6, the Leimern Tunnel and the Rugentunnel of the A8). The system in the Rugentunnel of the A8 was positively evaluated by the Technical Committee TC 4 of the CIE in 1980.

== Standards ==
Counter-beam lighting is incorporated into the recommendations of the International Commission on Illumination and some central European countries.

- International Commission on Illumination: CIE, Vienna, Austria; CIE 088:2004, 1990, Guide for the Lighting of Road Tunnels and Underpasses, ISBN 978-3-901906-31-2.
- Research Society für Street and Traffic Affairs Forschungsgesellschaft für Straßen- und Verkehrswesen (FGSV): Richtlinien für die Ausstattung und den Betrieb von Straßentunneln (RABT). Köln, Germany 2003.
- German Institute of Norms [ Deutsches Institut für Normung (DIN) e.V.], NA 058 Normenausschuss Lichttechnik (FNL): DIN 67 524-1, Beleuchtung von Straßentunnels und Unterführungen. Berlin 1987.
- Swiss Association for Standardization [ Schweizerische Normen-Vereinigung (SNV)]: (PDF; 70 kB)
- Austrian Research Society Street - Rail - Traffic Forschungsgesellschaft Straße – Schiene – Verkehr: Guidelines and Rules for Road Traffic Richtlinien und Vorschriften für das Straßenwesen (RVS) 09.02.41 Beleuchtung
