= Hindelbank Prison =

Women's prison in Hindelbank, Canton of Bern, Switzerland

Coordinates: 47.033°N 7.542°E

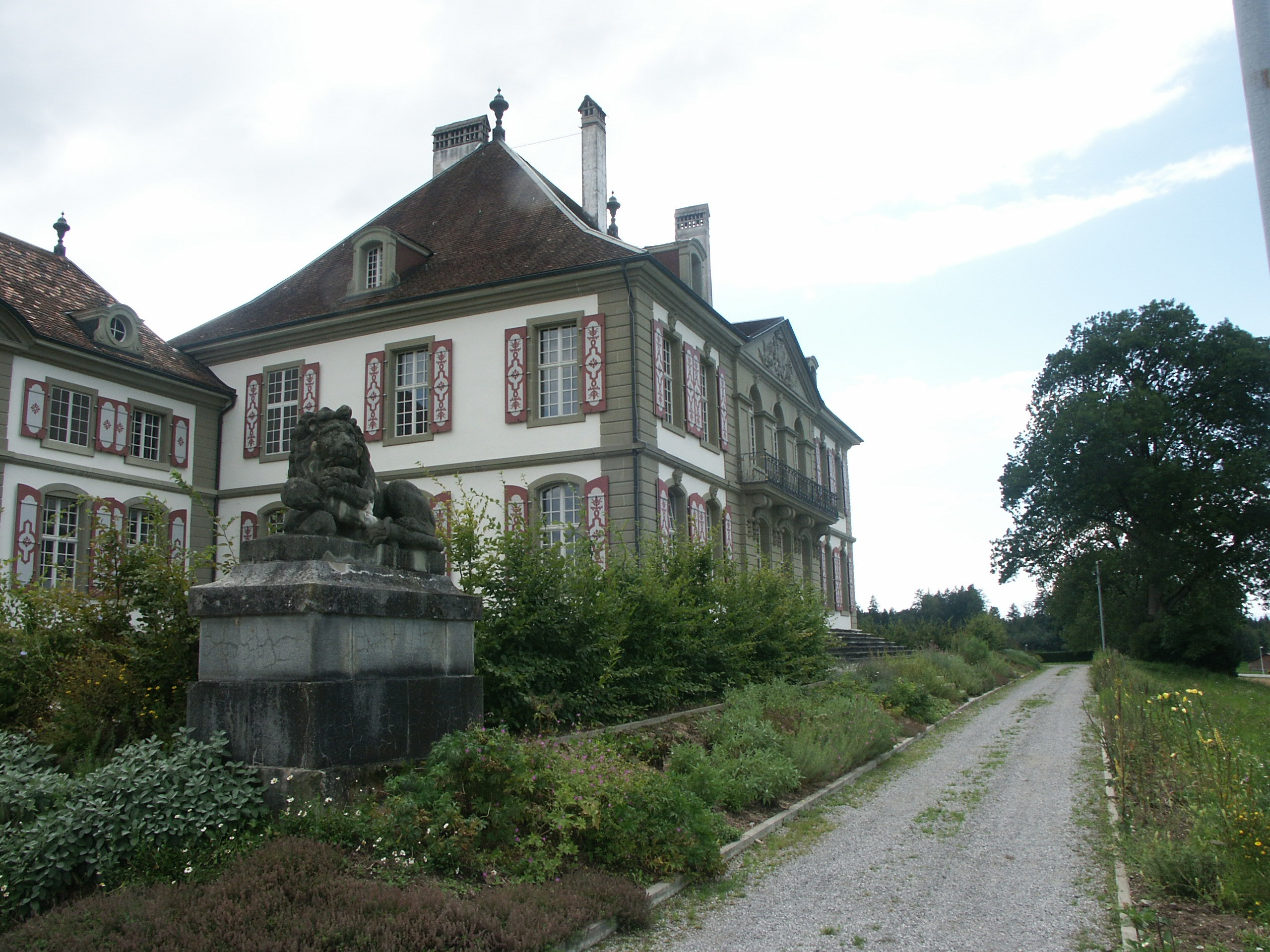
- Interactive map of Hindelbank Prison
- Location: Hindelbank
- Security class: Women's prison
- Capacity: 107 places
- Opened: 1896

The Hindelbank Prison (German: Justizvollzugsanstalt Hindelbank) is a Swiss prison for women located in the municipality of Hindelbank in the Canton of Bern. This facility is the only one in Switzerland exclusively dedicated to housing female inmates. It accommodates women sentenced to imprisonment or institutional therapeutic treatments.

== Overview ==
=== General Information ===
The penitentiary facility is located in the municipality of Hindelbank (Bern), near another cantonal prison, Thorberg.

The Hindelbank Prison is exclusively dedicated to the detention of women. It is the only facility of its kind in Switzerland, as other cantons have female sections within mixed facilities, such as La Tuilière Prison (Lonay - Vaud) or Champ-Dollon (Puplinge - Geneva). The women incarcerated there have been sentenced to imprisonment or institutional therapeutic treatments.

In 1966, the capacity of the Hindelbank Prison was 196 places (women). It has a capacity of 107 places in 2020.

The facility consists of 6 sectors:

- Open or closed ordinary detention spaces: sections for 16 to 23 inmates sentenced to imprisonment
- A therapeutic measures section: dedicated to inmates sentenced to therapeutic treatments
- A high-security detention space: section for dangerous inmates, who are generally isolated
- An integration space: section for vulnerable inmates, aimed at supporting their reintegration into ordinary detention
- A mother-child space: specific section with a daycare for six women caring for a child under three years old
- An external structure: located in Burgdorf, a section allowing women to work outside the penitentiary facility

In terms of training, the offerings at Hindelbank are more limited than those in men's penitentiaries, as only a housekeeping training program is available. The facility's management justifies this by stating it offers the most credible employability prospects for reintegration.

=== History ===
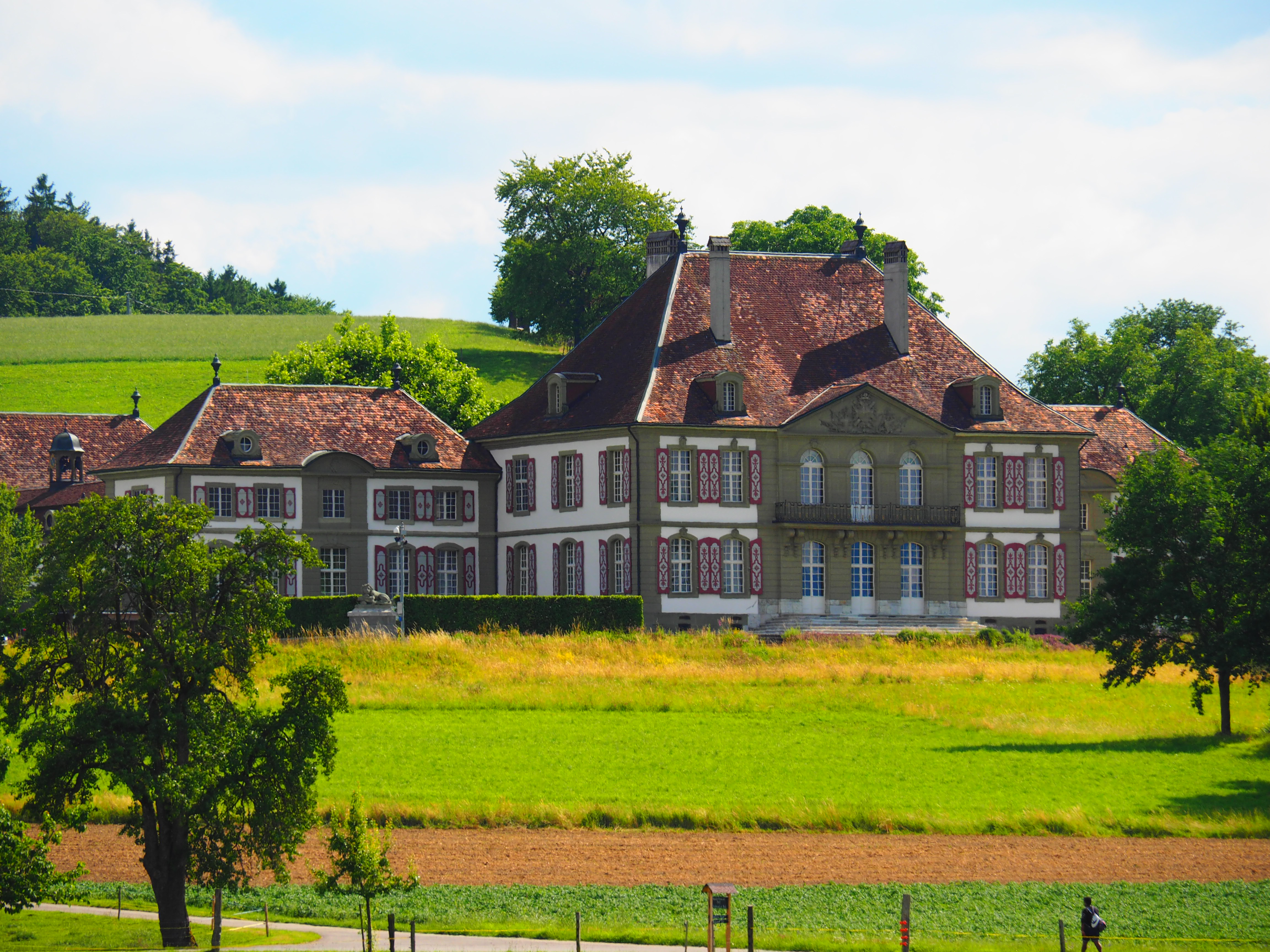
Former Hindelbank Castle

In 1866, the Canton of Bern purchased the Hindelbank Castle and established a charitable institution for women on the site. In 1896, Bernese authorities repurposed the facilities and established a forced labor institution for women. In 1912, the workhouse was converted into a detention facility for women.

The inmates occupied the castle and its outbuildings until 1959. At that time, several prison facilities were built on the site, becoming the main penitentiary spaces. Three years later, a section for mothers and their children was opened.

In 1999, a structure called “Steinhof” was opened in the municipality of Burgdorf. This off-site entity is designed for external detention, allowing women to work in the city.

A major renovation of the various infrastructures was completed in 1997. Regarding new constructions, a high-security unit was opened in 2002, and a unit specifically dedicated to therapeutic measures was opened in 2011.

=== Site development ===
In 2015, Bernese authorities indicated that Hindelbank's infrastructure was aging and required significant renovations in the short or medium term. However, due to difficulties in acquiring land around the facility, discussions were initiated regarding the potential closure of the Hindelbank site and the relocation of the women's facility to the Witzwil Prison site.

At the end of 2019, Bernese officials presented their penitentiary planning project. Contrary to what was suggested in 2015, the closure of the Hindelbank facility is no longer recommended. However, the overall program does not include major renovations for the Hindelbank site. Necessary work on the site is therefore planned within a different budgetary framework.

== Women's prison ==
=== Conditions ===
While some aspects of women's detention are similar to men's, there are significant differences that require specialized facilities. First, the rules governing female detention differ slightly from those for men, particularly in their practical application. For example, incarcerated mothers must be allowed to stay with their children under 3 years old, in accordance with the Convention on the Rights of the Child (UN), of which the Confederation is a signatory. Thus, several international law provisions have been incorporated into applicable Swiss law (Article 80 of the Swiss Penal Code) and result in specific and tailored measures within the detention framework.

In practical terms, women's detention is distinct primarily in the mother-child relationship. To allow mothers to stay with their children under 3 years old, Hindelbank Prison provides a daycare system during the day. This arrangement enables mothers to work during the day and care for their children independently the rest of the time. Additionally, cells are specially designed to allow a mother and her child to live separately from other cell and prison spaces.

More broadly, the facility promotes measures to enable mothers to maintain their parental authority. Since mothers often take on primary educational roles in many cultural contexts, their detention increases the risk of deficiencies for their children. Significant attention is therefore given to establishing regular contact between incarcerated women and their children, although distance sometimes complicates this, as in the case of extra-cantonal placements. Psycho-social support is also strengthened, as female inmates often experience significant psychological distress due to family separation.

Women's detention also requires the implementation of tailored sanitary and security procedures. The presence of specific medical conditions (such as breast cancer or gynecological issues) requires Hindelbank Prison to organize necessary screenings and follow-ups. Body searches are also adapted to respect inmates' privacy as much as possible, and handcuffing pregnant women is prohibited.

=== Overcrowding and extra-cantonal placements ===
In Switzerland, with women making up about 6% of the prison population in 2017, cantons face challenges in organizing their detention. The underrepresentation of this gender increases operating costs. This situation often leads to the closure of specialized facilities, as was the case with the Riant-Parc facility in Geneva. Lacking dedicated spaces for women's incarceration, the affected cantons must:

- Either incarcerate them in specific sections of men's prisons, as at Champ-Dollon, although detention conditions are not satisfactory
- Or manage to place their inmates in a specialized facility

As the only Swiss facility exclusively dedicated to women's detention, Hindelbank Prison's capacity is under significant pressure. The occupancy rate is consistently at 100%, with a substantial waiting list. For example, in 2017, 20 inmates were awaiting placement—nearly 20% of the facility's theoretical capacity. Additionally, 14 inmates in this German-speaking prison were from French-speaking Switzerland.

== Syringe distribution ==
In 1994, Hindelbank Prison installed a syringe dispenser for incarcerated individuals. Amid the HIV/AIDS pandemic, the authorities aimed to curb the spread of HIV within prison facilities, as inmates resorted to illicit drug injections despite bans, and to protect supervisory staff who could be injured by makeshift syringes during searches. The project was a world first and faced some opposition, with several officials arguing that prisons should not facilitate drug use.

== Administrative internments ==
From the 1910s, authorities in various cantons implemented a policy of interning individuals deemed unfit for decent social life. These internments, outside the standard penal system—neither crimes nor offenses—lacked incrimination or legal classification and were sometimes marked by arbitrariness (e.g., in Fribourg, only the prefect decided on internments). Administrative internments took place in penal institutions alongside common-law inmates. Alcoholics or impoverished individuals thus faced detention conditions similar to those of convicted prisoners.

For women, these measures led to significant repression of behaviors deemed contrary to good morals. Single mothers or pregnant unmarried women were particularly targeted. As one of the few facilities able to accommodate female inmates, Hindelbank was heavily used for administrative internments between 1930 (the peak of internment decisions) and 1981 (the abolition of the administrative internment regime).

The lives of women placed in internment at Hindelbank were almost identical to those of convicted inmates, except for wearing a different uniform. Victims described the violence of their detention (harassment, forced labor, deprivation of liberty) and their incomprehension of this repressive system. Some also mentioned the isolation they experienced within the facility, with visits being rare and package contents generally censored.

Criticized for its abuses and violations of human rights, the administrative internment regime has been extensively studied by historians and legal scholars, leading to significant publications and public outreach efforts. Federal and cantonal authorities have supported this work of memory and recognition of the victims' suffering. A ceremony of apology was held at the Hindelbank site in 2010.

== Incidents ==
=== Escape ===
In 2017, an inmate escaped from the facility's premises. Taking advantage of outdated security elements, she managed to climb a fence before fleeing. She was arrested six months later by Italian police

== See also ==
- National Commission for the Prevention of Torture
