= Federal Office of Justice =

Swiss government agency

- (in German) Bundesamt für Justiz (in French) Office fédéral de la justice (in Italian) Ufficio federale di giustizia

Agency overview
- Jurisdiction: Federal administration of Switzerland
- Headquarters: Bern
- Minister responsible: Élisabeth Baume-Schneider, Federal Councillor
- Parent agency: Federal Department of Justice and Police
- Website: bj.admin.ch

The Federal Office of Justice (FOJ) (Note: German: Bundesamt für Justiz, BJ, French: Office fédéral de la justice, OFJ, Italian: Ufficio federale di giustizia, UFG) is a Swiss federal authority subordinated to the Federal Department of Justice and Police.

== Background ==
The FOJ is responsible for the development and formulation of ordinances on the main areas of law, including private law, criminal law, debt collection and bankruptcy law, international private law and public and administrative law, which are issued by the Federal Council.

Additionally, it oversees various registers such as the commercial register, births registry, marriage registry, and deaths registry, land registry, criminal convictions, and enforces criminal penalties. At an international level, it represents Switzerland in various organizations, including the Strasbourg human rights bodies. It is also the national agency for cases of international child abduction and collaborates with foreign authorities in areas of judicial assistance and extraditions.

== Full-time positions since 2001 ==
Raw data

"Federal Finance Administration FFA: State financial statements".
"Federal Finance Administration FFA: Data portal".
