= Federal Gaming Board =

Swiss casino regulatory authority

- Eidgenössische Spielbankenkommission; Commission fédérale des maisons de jeu Commissione federale delle case da gioco

Agency overview
- Headquarters: Bern, Switzerland
- Parent department: Federal Department of Justice and Police
- Website: www.esbk.admin.ch

The Federal Gaming Board (FGB; German: Eidgenössische Spielbankenkommission, ESBK; French: Commission fédérale des maisons de jeu, CFMJ; Italian: Commissione federale delle case da gioco, CFCG) is an independent Swiss federal authority responsible for supervising casinos, levying casino tax, and combating illegal gambling.

== Responsibilities ==
The FGB monitors compliance with legal provisions relating to casinos and casino licensing, ensuring that casino games are operated transparently and safely. It oversees casino implementation of measures to prevent money laundering and terrorist financing, as well as player protection measures against gambling-related harms.

The authority assesses and collects casino tax on behalf of the federal government. It also combats illegal gambling by blocking access to unauthorized online gambling platforms and prosecuting illegal gambling operations.

== Organization ==
The FGB operates as an independent authority, administratively attached to the Federal Department of Justice and Police. Its headquarters are located in Bern.

== See also ==
- Gambling in Switzerland
