= National Commission for the Prevention of Torture =

- (in German) Nationale Kommission zur Verhütung von Folter (in French) Commission nationale de prévention de la torture (in Italian) Commissione nazionale per la prevenzione della tortura

Independent administrative authority overview
- Formed: 2010; 16 years ago
- Jurisdiction: Switzerland
- Headquarters: Schwanengasse, 2; 3003 Bern
- Website: https://www.nkvf.admin.ch/

The National Commission for the Prevention of Torture (NCPT) is an independent Swiss federal body. It was created by the Federal Council in 2010 following the ratification of the UN Optional Protocol against Torture. Its role is to monitor respect for human rights in Switzerland and to make recommendations to the authorities where necessary. The NCPT is strongly committed to the issues of detention conditions, conditions of deportation of migrants and living conditions in institutions (e.g. psychiatric institutions). In addition to its regular reports (visits to detention facilities, etc.), the Commission publishes reports on specific topics.

== Overview ==
=== Background ===
On 24 September 2009 the Swiss Confederation became the fiftieth state to sign the UN Optional Protocol against Torture. One of the conditions for signing was the creation of a commission dedicated to the monitoring and prevention of torture on the territory of the country in question, and the Federal Council established the National Commission for the Prevention of Torture for this purpose in 2010.

=== Legal framework ===
Besides the UN Optional Protocol, the activities of the National Commission for the Prevention of Torture are governed and regulated by the Federal Act on the Commission for the Prevention of Torture.

=== Missions and activities ===
The commission's main task is to visit places of deprivation of liberty. The commission's main task is to visit places of deprivation of liberty. This definition should be understood in a very broad sense. Thus, while prisons are the primary places of detention, the scope of the NCPT's visit also includes police stations (many of which have cells for police custody), psychiatric hospitals and administrative detention centres. These places are inherently prone to human rights abuses.

Initially, it was not the task of the commission to observe deportation flights of rejected migrants. However, it was acquired in 2012 after severe criticism of the methods used by the federal administration and the need for the Confederation to bring itself into legal conformity with European directives.

The main activities of the committee are the publication of reports on the visits of the institutions carried out by its members. It also publishes specific reports on issues within its remit. Finally, it can carry out lobbying activities, including public statements as in 2012.

=== Membership and organisation ===
The commission is composed of 12 members, all experts in criminal justice or deprivation of liberty.

A group of observers, also experts in these fields, may be mandated by the commission to observe repatriation flights.

=== History ===
In 2006, the Federal Council submitted a proposal for the creation of a commission for the prevention of torture to the Parliament. This was part of the process of ratifying the UN Optional Protocol against Torture.

In 2009, the Confederation launched a campaign to recruit experts in order to create the National Commission for the Prevention of Torture the following year. At the same time, the Parliament voted to create the NCPT.

The National Commission for the Prevention of Torture is established in 2010.

In 2012, at the end of its second year of operation, the President of the NCPT calls for changes in the organisation of the commission. It indicates in particular that its organisational structure should be reviewed in order to legally clarify several observation missions carried out outside its initial administrative framework.

== Mission extension: observers of deportations of rejected migrants ==
In the early 2010s, Switzerland was marked by a major controversy concerning the deportation of rejected migrants. Following the death of a 29-year-old Nigerian during deportation, the methods used by the Federal Office for Migration during repatriation are being strongly criticised. The violence surrounding the special flights is being denounced.

In order to return people who refuse to take a scheduled flight to their country of origin, including under police escort, the Swiss administration has chosen to operate special flights. These flights, which numbered 45 in 2008 and 43 in 2009, are specially chartered by the authorities to deport recalcitrant people. Migrants are shackled to get on the plane, even tied to chairs and carried if they resist boarding. Once on the plane, they are tied to their seats.

In 2011, the National Commission for the Prevention of Torture published a severe report on the methods of deportation during special flights by the Federal Office for Migration. Although the frequency of special flights was slowed down by the criminal investigation in 2010, the commission's observers report that the procedure used to deport recalcitrant migrants remained almost the same as when the young Nigerian died. The only significant difference is the presence of a doctor on the aircraft. However, there are insufficient doctors and their training is not adapted to this context. The members of the committee are particularly critical of the systematic use of the maximum security procedure, where other countries apply procedures in a more gradual and nuanced way. For example, the use of heavy restraints and shackles is the norm on Swiss special flights, while the Austrian authorities explain that restraints and handcuffs are used in only 5% of cases.

Moreover, in violation of a European regulation, the Federal Office for Migration did not appoint independent observers to monitor the proper conduct and respect for human rights during deportations. In March 2012, a solution was found by adding the accompanying of returned migrants to the scope of the NCPT's tasks. This monitoring of the NCPT requires a set of legal adjustments to ensure the independence of the observers. For example, it is not the Federal Office for Migration that mandates the commission to observe the smooth running of special flights.

== Concerns and criticisms ==
Even before the establishment of the commission, reservations were expressed about the tasks and usefulness of the body. The reservations and criticisms generally concern the lack of resources allocated to the commission, its usefulness in relation to its resources and also the usefulness of signing up to binding international agreements on this issue.

=== Lack of funds ===
During the parliamentary debate to establish the commission, Amnesty criticised the Federal Council's proposals. While the association defends the merits of a body to monitor places of deprivation of liberty, it criticises the political authorities for the lack of resources that it is planned to allocate to it, given its broad field of competence (visits to prisons, but also to psychiatric hospitals, police stations, etc.).

The President of the NCPT considers in 2010 that the budget foreseen for the functioning of the commission is insufficient.

In 2019, the UN delegation of the Subcommittee on Prevention of Torture made its first official visit to Switzerland. After several days of visits to prisons, police stations, psychiatric hospitals and administrative detention centres in the cantons of Zurich, Geneva, Bern and Vaud, the UN experts called on the Confederation to increase the financial resources made available to the commission to carry out its tasks.

=== Alibi Committee ===
The parliamentary debate that preceded the creation of the commission shows the tensions generated by the authority of such a body. While associations such as Amnesty or MPs such as Martine Brunschwig Graf recommend an ambitious policy and an extensive use of the NCPT, including the creation of a permanent secretariat (an essential condition to ensure its effectiveness according to the association), the Council of States is more reserved. Besides removing the reference to a permanent secretariat, it removes the notion of regularity for visits. A series of subsequent amendments reintroduce the regularity of visits but fail to create the permanent secretariat, which is merely foreseen. The position of the Swiss MPs therefore makes human rights defenders fear that the commission does not have sufficient credibility and legitimacy to be effective. The NCPT could then become counterproductive in the fight against torture, serving as an alibi for the authorities to dismiss critics.

Furthermore, the members of the committee recognise the difficulty they have in adopting an objective position on certain issues. Indeed, having been chosen for their expertise and experience, the various members sometimes find themselves in conflicting positions. They then ask not to work on certain subjects, complicating the organisation of the NCPT's follow-up and raising fears of potential conflicts of interest.

Finally, it is the Commission itself which, noting the lack of resources and certain operational difficulties for the experts, fears playing an alibi role.

=== Usefulness of international agreements against torture ===
Consistent with its sovereignist positions and its refusal to see the Confederation sign the Protocol, the Swiss People's Party (SVP) criticises the creation of the commission, which it considers unnecessary. For the party representatives, such international conventions have little impact, as they are not signed by states that engage in reprehensible practices and create a complex legal situation for countries that are already active in this area. In a more general way, it is the obligation to comply with binding international standards (obligation of visits by an independent body) that is rejected by this political movement. The SVP points out that Swiss places of detention are visited, including by foreign bodies, without the need for a legal framework and the ratification of international agreements.

Human rights groups counter by pointing out that the strength of these agreements comes from the signatory countries and their willingness to create a binding legal framework on these issues. They also indicate that the practical implementation of the agreements is leading authorities to innovate and create useful new structures. For example, the creation of monitoring commissions was not envisaged at the beginning of the UN's reflections on the Optional Protocol. It is only with practice that the various actors have concluded that these bodies are important.

== Legal activity ==
In 2012, the National Commission for the Prevention of Torture called on the federal and political authorities to include the crime of torture in the Swiss criminal code. The members of the NCPT explain that the legal provisions in force in the country must be brought into line with UN standards. They are too ambiguous and their application is too restrictive. The aim is to clarify local situations in which appellants cannot invoke international law. This position paper is part of the preparation of the Universal Periodic Review before the Human Rights Council and echoes the demands of several associations involved in the issue in Switzerland.

== Acceptance of the committee's work ==
In its first year of operation in 2011, the Commission publishes two reports on the Hindelbank prison (Bern) and the administrative detention centre in Grenchen (Valais). In the face of the Bernese authorities' distrust of the commission's work, associations indicate that the administrative authorities should rather rely on the commission's authority and influence in order to obtain support.

During its Universal Periodic Review before the Human Rights Council in Geneva, Switzerland highlights its concrete achievements in the defence of human rights. In this respect, the creation of the National Commission for the Prevention of Torture is considered a success by the authorities.

The establishment of the National Commission for the Prevention of Torture has been welcomed by many international bodies involved in humanitarian and human rights issues. For example, during the review of Switzerland by the UN Human Rights Committee in 2017, the UN specialists welcomed the creation and progress made possible by the National Commission for the Prevention of Torture (the previous review dated from 2009, before the creation of the NCPT). On this occasion, the Committee recommends that the Confederation ensure the presence of CNPT observers during the removal of rejected migrants.

== See also ==
=== Related articles ===
- Human rights
- Federal Department of Justice and Police
- Federal administration of Switzerland

=== External links ===
- Website of the National Commission for the Prevention of Torture

== Appendices ==
- Optional Protocol to the Convention against Torture and Other Cruel, Inhuman or Degrading Treatment or Punishment (2002)
- Federal Act on the Commission for the Prevention of Torture of March 20, 2009 (as of January 1, 2020), SR 150.1.
