= SNV =

SNV may refer to:

- Schweizerische Normen-Vereinigung (Swiss Association for Standardization), Swiss technical association for participation in international standards development
- Sin Nombre virus, agent of hantavirus pulmonary syndrome
- Single-nucleotide variant, an example of single-nucleotide polymorphism
- Southern Nevada
- Srpsko narodno vijeće (Serb National Council), group representing ethnic Serbs in Croatia
- SNV (typeface), a typeface used on road signs in some countries
- SNV Netherlands Development Organisation (formerly Stichting Nederlandse Vrijwilligers, "Foundation of Netherlands Volunteers"), a Dutch NGO for international development
- SNV Valiant, U.S. Navy version of the Vultee BT-13 Valiant trainer aircraft
- Systemic necrotizing vasculitis (Systemic vasculitis), inflammation of blood vessels leading to necrosis
