= Federal Department of Justice and Police =

Swiss government department

- Eidgenössisches Justiz- und Polizeidepartement (German); Département fédéral de justice et police (French); Dipartimento federale di giustizia e polizia (Italian); Departament federal da giustia e polizia (Romansh)

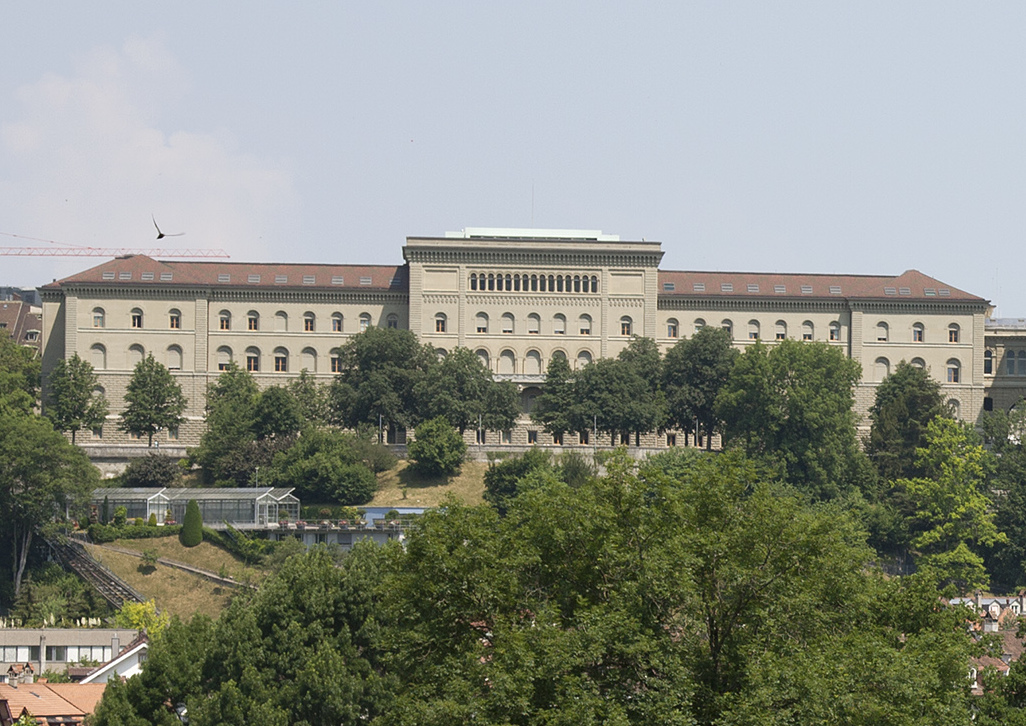
- The west wing of the Federal Palace of Switzerland

Agency overview
- Formed: 1848; 178 years ago
- Jurisdiction: Federal administration of Switzerland
- Headquarters: Federal Palace (west wing), Bern
- Employees: 2,203
- Annual budget: Expenditure: CHF 1.4 billion; Revenue: CHF 130.8 million (2009)
- Minister responsible: Beat Jans, Federal Councillor
- Child agencies: State Secretariat for Migration; Federal Office of Justice; Federal Office of Police; Federal Institute of Metrology; Swiss Federal Institute of Intellectual Property; Swiss Institute of Comparative Law; Federal Gaming Board; National Commission for the Prevention of Torture; Federal Commission on Migration; Federal Commission for the Administration of Copyright and Related Rights; Federal Audit Oversight Authority; Federal Commission for the Assessment of the Possibilities for the Treatment of Persons Interned for Life
- Website: www.ejpd.admin.ch/ejpd/en/home.html

The Federal Department of Justice and Police (FDJP; German: Eidgenössisches Justiz- und Polizeidepartement; French: Département fédéral de justice et police; Italian: Dipartimento federale di giustizia e polizia; Romansh: Departament federal da giustia e polizia) is one of the seven departments of the Swiss federal government, and is equivalent to a ministry of justice in other countries. As of 2024, it is headed by Federal Councillor Beat Jans. Until 1979, the department was known as the Department of Justice and Police.

== Organisation ==
The department is composed of the following offices and institutes:

- General Secretariat (GS-FDJP)
  - IT Service Centre (ISC-FDJP)
  - Post and Telecommunications Surveillance Service (PTSS)
- Federal Offices
  - State Secretariat for Migration (SEM): Responsible for matters relating to foreign nationals and asylum seekers.
  - Federal Office of Justice (FOI): Responsible for providing legal advice to the administration, preparing general legislation, supervising government registers and collaborating on international judicial assistance.
  - Federal Office of Police (fedpol): Responsible for intercantonal and international information, coordination and analysis in internal security matters. It also operates the domestic intelligence service (Service for Analysis and Prevention SAP), and the Federal Criminal Police (FCP), which investigates crimes subject to federal jurisdiction.
- Institutes
  - Federal Institute of Metrology (METAS): Provides calibration and accreditation services, supervises the use of measuring instruments and provides training in metrology.
  - Swiss Federal Institute of Intellectual Property (IPI): Registration authority for patents, trademarks and industrial design.
  - Swiss Institute of Comparative Law (SICL): Provides consultancy services on issues of comparative law.
- Commissions
  - Federal Gaming Board (FGB): Regulates casinos and enforces Swiss gambling law (except lotteries, which are regulated by the cantons).
  - National Commission for the Prevention of Torture
  - Federal Commission on Migration
  - Federal Commission for the Administration of Copyright and Related Rights
- Administratively assigned
  - Federal Audit Oversight Authority (FAOA)
  - Federal Commission for the Assessment of the Possibilities for the Treatment of Persons Interned for Life
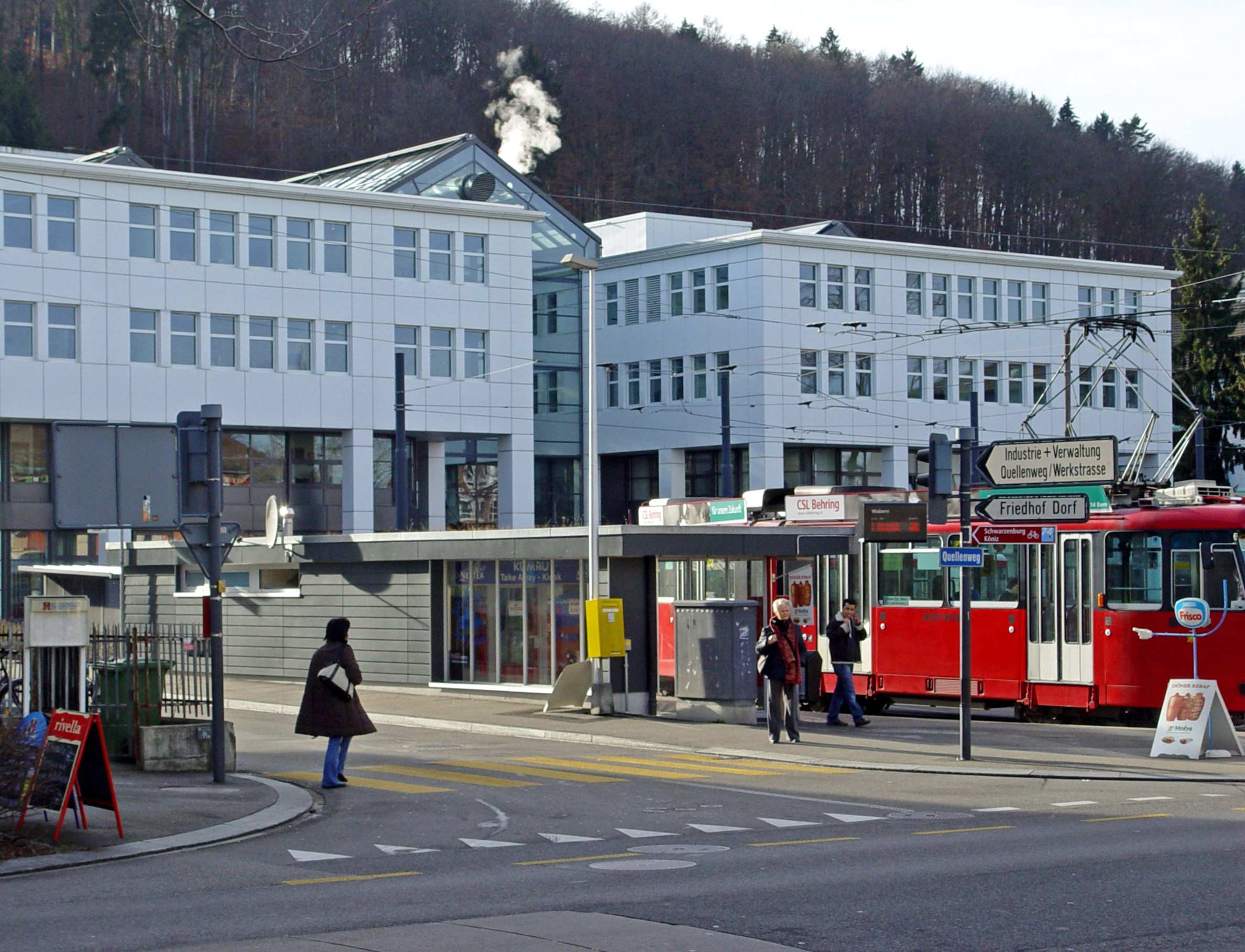
Building of the Federal Office for Migration (later renamed State Secretariat for Migration) in Bern

== List of heads of the department ==
- 1848–1849: Henri Druey
- 1850–1851: Jonas Furrer
- 1852 only: Henri Druey
- 1853–1854: Jonas Furrer
- 1855 only: Jakob Stämpfli
- 1856–1857: Jonas Furrer
- 1858 only: Josef Martin Knüsel
- 1859–1861: Jonas Furrer
- 1861–1863: Jakob Dubs
- 1864–1865: Josef Martin Knüsel
- 1866 only: Jakob Dubs
- 1867–1873: Josef Martin Knüsel
- 1874–1875: Paul Cérésole
- 1876–1880: Fridolin Anderwert
- 1881 only: Emil Welti
- 1882 only: Antoine Louis John Ruchonnet
- 1883 only: Adolf Deucher
- 1884–1893: Antoine Louis John Ruchonnet
- 1894–1895: Eugène Ruffy
- 1895–1897: Eduard Müller
- 1897–1900: Ernst Brenner
- 1901 only: Robert Comtesse
- 1902–1907: Ernst Brenner
- 1908 only: Josef Anton Schobinger
- 1908 only: Ludwig Forrer
- 1909–1911: Ernst Brenner
- 1911 only: Arthur Hoffmann
- 1912 only: Eduard Müller
- 1913 only: Camille Decoppet
- 1914–1919: Eduard Müller
- 1920–1934: Heinrich Häberlin
- 1934–1940: Johannes Baumann
- 1941–1951: Eduard von Steiger
- 1952–1958: Markus Feldmann
- 1959 only: Friedrich Traugott Wahlen
- 1960–1971: Ludwig von Moos
- 1972–1982: Kurt Furgler
- 1983–1984: Rudolf Friedrich
- 1984–1989: Elisabeth Kopp
- 1989–1999: Arnold Koller
- 1999–2003: Ruth Metzler
- 2004–2007: Christoph Blocher
- 2008–2010: Eveline Widmer-Schlumpf
- 2010-2018: Simonetta Sommaruga
- 2019-2022: Karin Keller-Sutter
- 2023 only: Élisabeth Baume-Schneider
- Since 2023: Beat Jans

== Full-time positions since 2001 ==
Raw data

"Federal Finance Administration FFA: State financial statements".
"Federal Finance Administration FFA: Data portal".

== See also ==
- Organisation suisse d'aide aux réfugiés
