= Swiss Gambling Supervisory Authority =

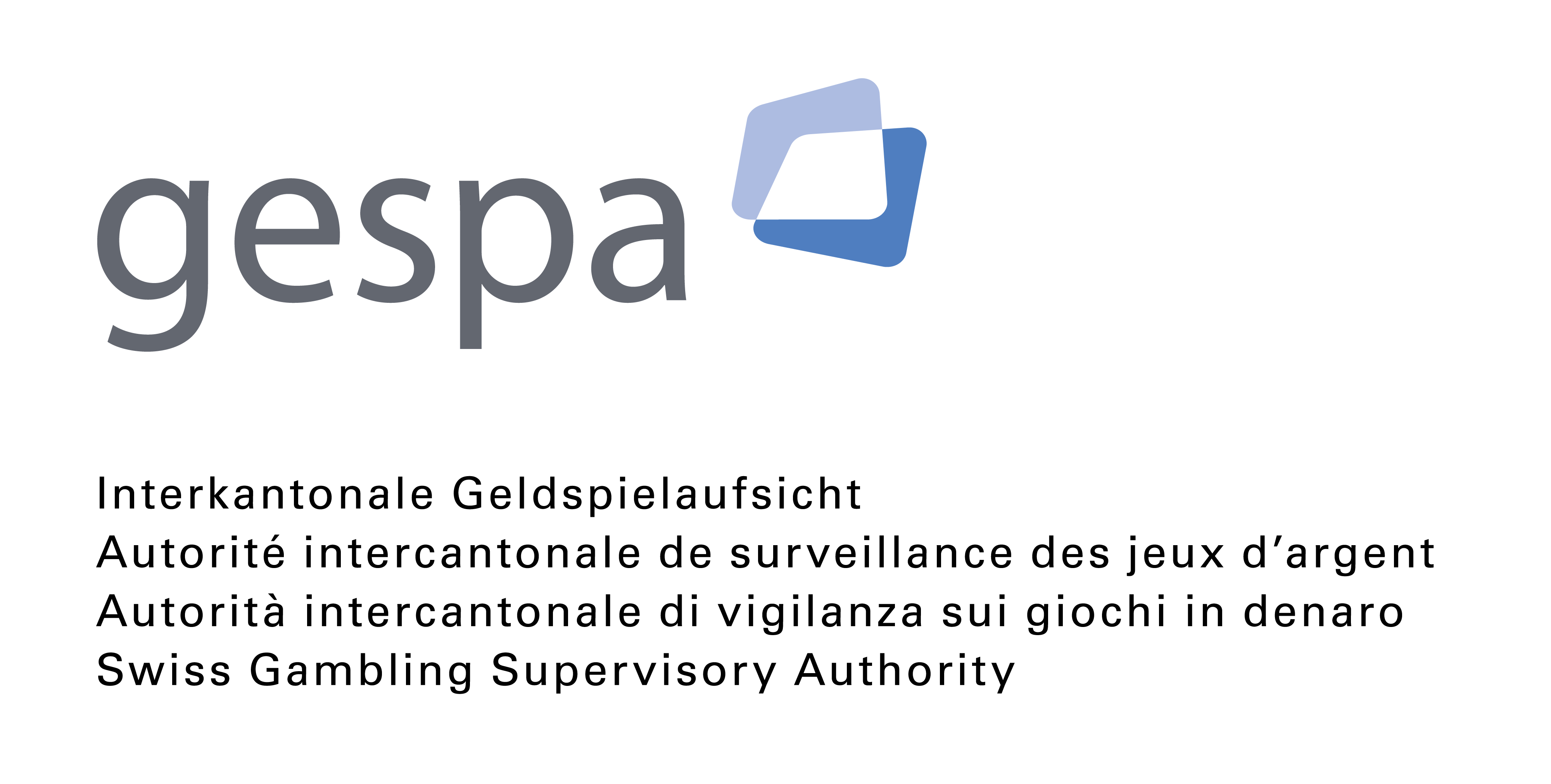

Government agency overview
- Formed: 2006
- Headquarters: Bern
- Employees: 16
- Government agency executive: Jean-Michel Cina
- Website: www.gespa.ch/en

The Swiss Gambling Supervisory Authority (or Gespa; Interkantonale Geldspielaufsicht in German, Autorité intercantonale de surveillance des jeux d'argent in French, Autorità intercantonale di vigilanza sui giochi in denaro in Italian) is the licensing and supervisory authority for so-called large-scale Gambling activities, i.e. lotteries, sports betting and skill-based games run intercantonally, online or by automated means. It has its seat in Bern.

== Founding and organisation ==
Gespa (until 31.12.2020 Comlot) commenced its certification and oversight tasks on July 1, 2006. On 1 January 2021, the Concordat on Gambling (GSK) has entered into force. The Concordat replaces the Intercantonal Convention on Licensing and Supervision of Intercantonal and National Lotteries and Bets IVLW. All litigation pending with Comlot and all of Comlot’s rights and responsibilities have been transferred to Gespa.

=== Supervisory board ===
The Supervisory Board is Gespa’s executive body. It consists of five members including its president, Jean-Michel Cina. Two commission members each are from French and German-speaking Switzerland, while one member is from Italian-speaking Switzerland (canton of Ticino).

The president and the supervisory board members are nominated by the Swiss cantonal executives by the Conference of Cantonal Directors – Money Games (FDKG).

On 1 January 2022, Jean-Michel Cina took over as President of Gespa. He succeeds Jean-François Roth, who had been in post since Gespa (formerly Comlot) was founded in 2006.

=== Head office ===
The Supervisory Board is assisted by a permanent office that runs Gespa's operations. The office is headed by the Director, Manuel Richard, and employs 16 people (as of January 2021).

== Tasks ==
=== Supervision of authorized large-scale gambling ===
On the basis of the relevant legislation, Gespa’s task is to ensure that large-scale gambling operators pay proper attention to the risks involved (fraud, money laundering, problem gambling). A particular focus is laid on youth protection and prevention of excessive gambling. Before granting a licence, Gespa assesses the risk potentials of the game to be licensed using tried-and-tested methods. Depending on such assessment, appropriate protective measures may be demanded.

=== Fighting illegal gambling ===
Gespa runs regulatory investigations on suspected cases within its sphere of responsibility and assists law enforcement agencies in combatting the illegal market under criminal law. In close cooperation with the Federal Gaming Board and Swiss internet providers, Gespa deploys technical measures to ban illegal online gambling operators from accessing the Swiss market. The aim is to prevent operators that evade regulatory supervision by means of an offshore home base from being active in Switzerland.

The Gambling Act entrusts Gespa with important responsibilities with regard to taking steps against competition manipulation in sports.

=== Centre of expertise for money games ===
Gespa is the centre of expertise of the cantons for all gambling-related issues.

== Goals ==
Gespa supervises the enforcement of the Federal Act on Gambling, of the Ordinance, and of the Gambling Concordat. It ensures that residents of Switzerland can participate in lotteries, sports betting and skill-based games in a safe and socially responsible manner.

Legislators and regulatory bodies lay their focus on problem gambling (in particular addiction) and gambling-related crime (such as fraud or money laundering). They further strive to ensure that large parts of the revenues generated by gambling accrue to the state.
