= Hindelbank Castle =

- Schloss Hindelbank (German)
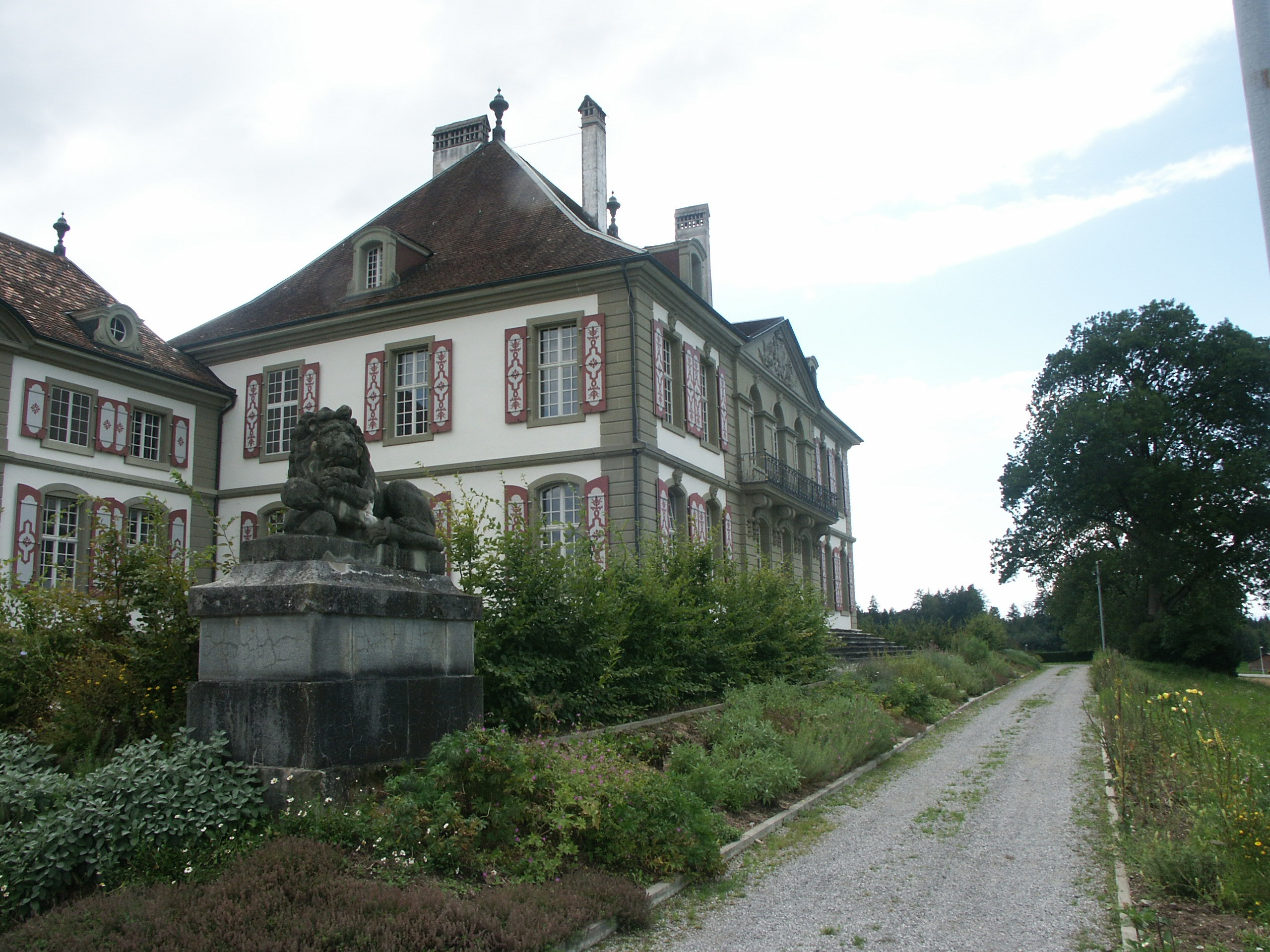
- Hindelbank Castle exterior

- Location within Switzerland
- 47°02′00″N 7°32′28″E
- Type: Castle
- Location: Hindelbank, Bern, Switzerland

History
- Built: 1721-25

Site notes
- Architect: Joseph Abeille
- Owner: Canton of Bern

Swiss Cultural Property of National Significance
- Reference no.: 942

Hindelbank Castle is a castle in the municipality of Hindelbank of the Canton of Bern in Switzerland. It is a Swiss heritage site of national significance. It was sold to the canton in 1866 and later became a workhouse and a prison. Currently, it is the administration building of the only women's prison in Switzerland.

== History ==
Hindelbank Castle was built in 1720-25 for Schultheiss Hieronymus von Erlach by Daniel Stürler (1674-1746) based on plans from the French architect Joseph Abeille. The floor plan was based on Thunstetten Castle which Abeille had designed for von Erlach in 1711. The castle remained in the Erlach family until 1866 when Robert von Erlach sold the castle to the Canton of Bern and the surrounding land to a private buyer. Under the canton's ownership, the castle became a workhouse for poor women, until 1896 when it became a women's reformatory. It was extensively renovated in 1962-66 and again in 1996. After the first renovation it became the administrative center for Switzerland's only women's prison, a role that it still fulfills today.

== Design and layout ==
The imposing castle was built with a north facing cour d'honneur or three-sided courtyard with a two-story corps de logis topped with a steep hipped roof. The façade of the central building features two rows of seven symmetrical windows and doors.

== See also ==
- List of castles in Switzerland
