= Federal Institute of Metrology =

Swiss government agency

- (in German) Eidgenössisches Institut für Metrologie (in French) Institut fédéral de métrologie (in Italian) Istituto federale di metrologia (in Romansh) Institut federal da metrologia

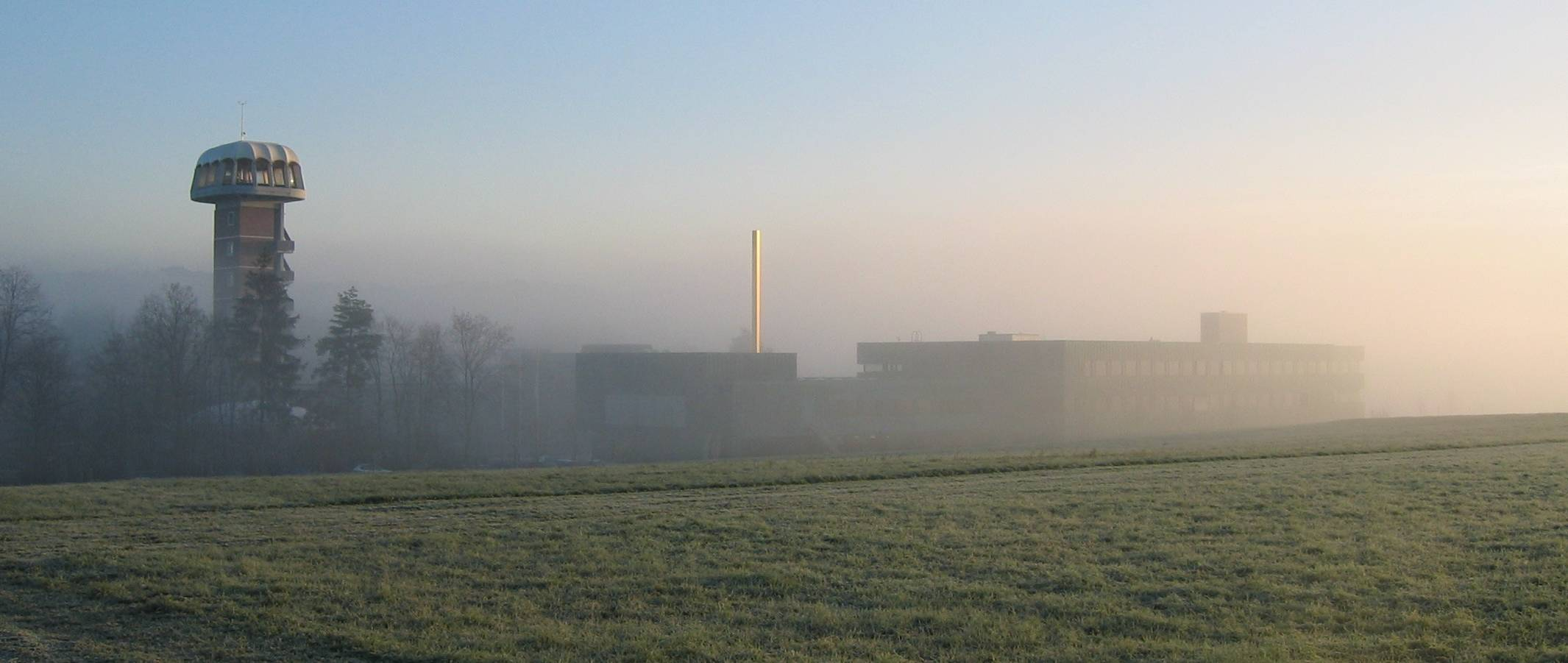
- Headquarters in Wabern, in late autumn (2003).

Agency overview
- Jurisdiction: Federal administration of Switzerland
- Headquarters: Wabern
- Minister responsible: Simonetta Sommaruga, Federal Councillor
- Parent agency: Federal Department of Justice and Police
- Website: www.metas.ch

The Federal Institute of Metrology (METAS) (Note: German: Eidgenössisches Institut für Metrologie, French: Institut fédéral de métrologie, Italian: Istituto federale di metrologia, Romansh: Institut federal da metrologia) is the Swiss national metrology organization. It is part of the Federal Department of Justice and Police.
