= Hindelbank =

- Municipality
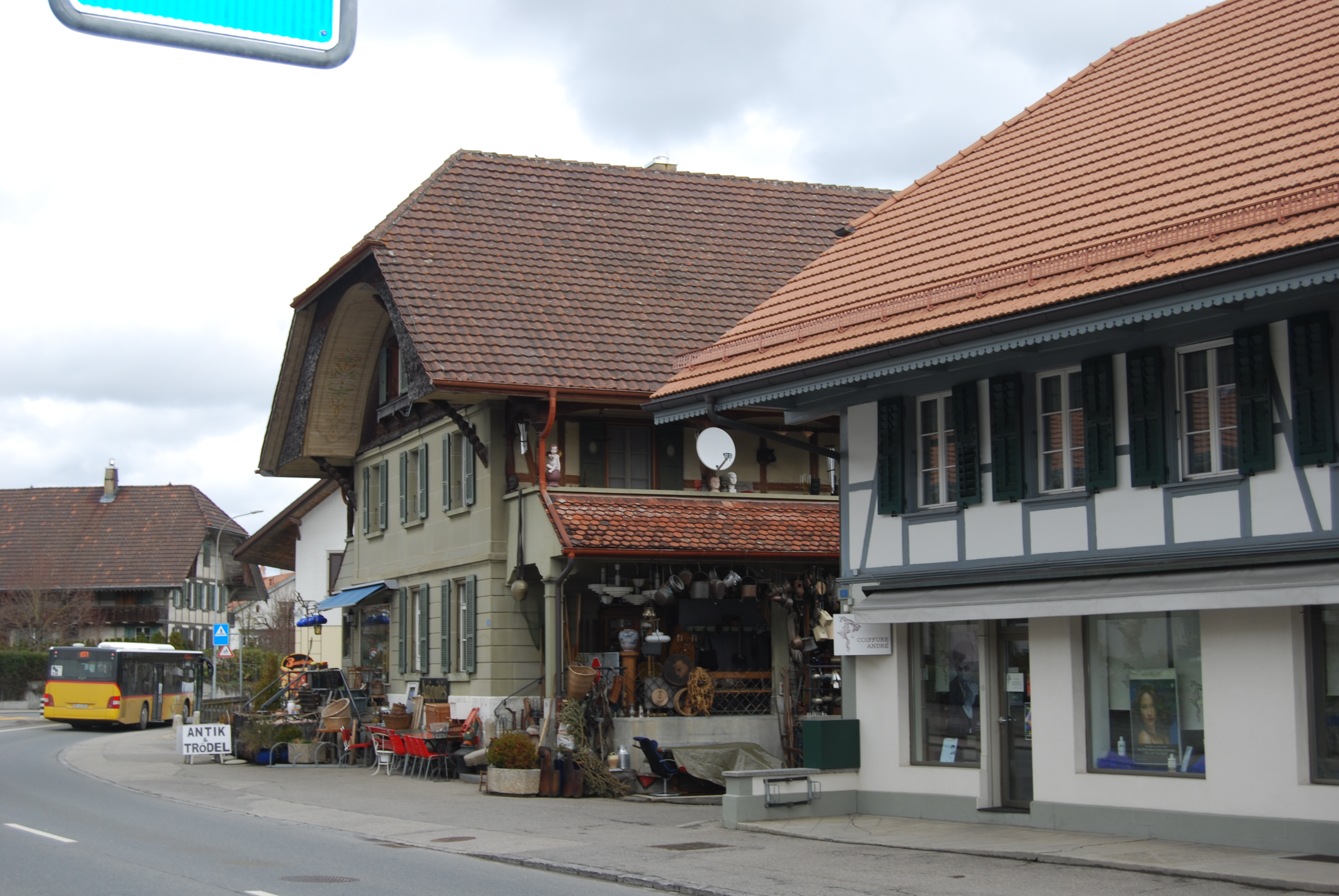
- Hindelbank

- Flag Coat of arms
- Location of Hindelbank
- Location within Switzerland Location within Canton of Bern
- Coordinates: 47°3′N 7°32′E
- Country: Switzerland
- Canton: Bern
- District: Emmental

Area
  - Total: 6.74 km^{2} (2.60 sq mi)
- Elevation: 519 m (1,703 ft)

Population (December 2020)
  - Total: 2,519
  - Density: 374/km^{2} (968/sq mi)
- Time zone: UTC+01:00 (CET)
  - Summer (DST): UTC+02:00 (CEST)
- Postal code: 3324
- SFOS number: 409
- ISO 3166 code: CH-BE
- Surrounded by: Bäriswil, Kernenried, Krauchthal, Lyssach, Mattstetten, Münchringen
- Website: www.hindelbank.ch

Hindelbank is a municipality in the administrative district of Emmental in the canton of Bern in Switzerland. On 1 January 2021 the former municipality of Mötschwil merged into Hindelbank.

== History ==
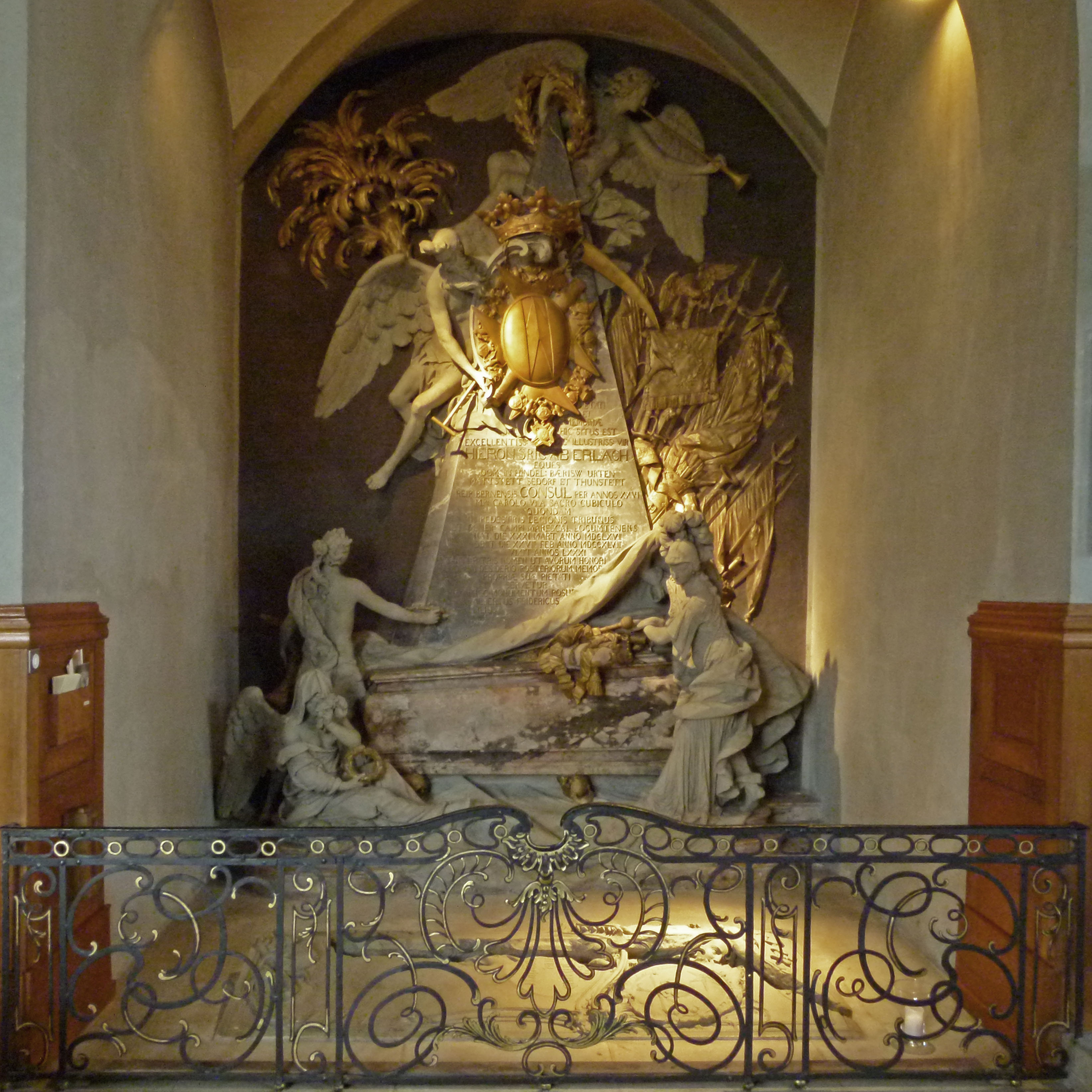
Monumental tomb for Hironymus von Erlach who died in 1748. On the floor is the tomb of Maria Magdalena Langhans, the wife of a pastor, who died in 1751. Both tombs are the work of Johann August Nahl.

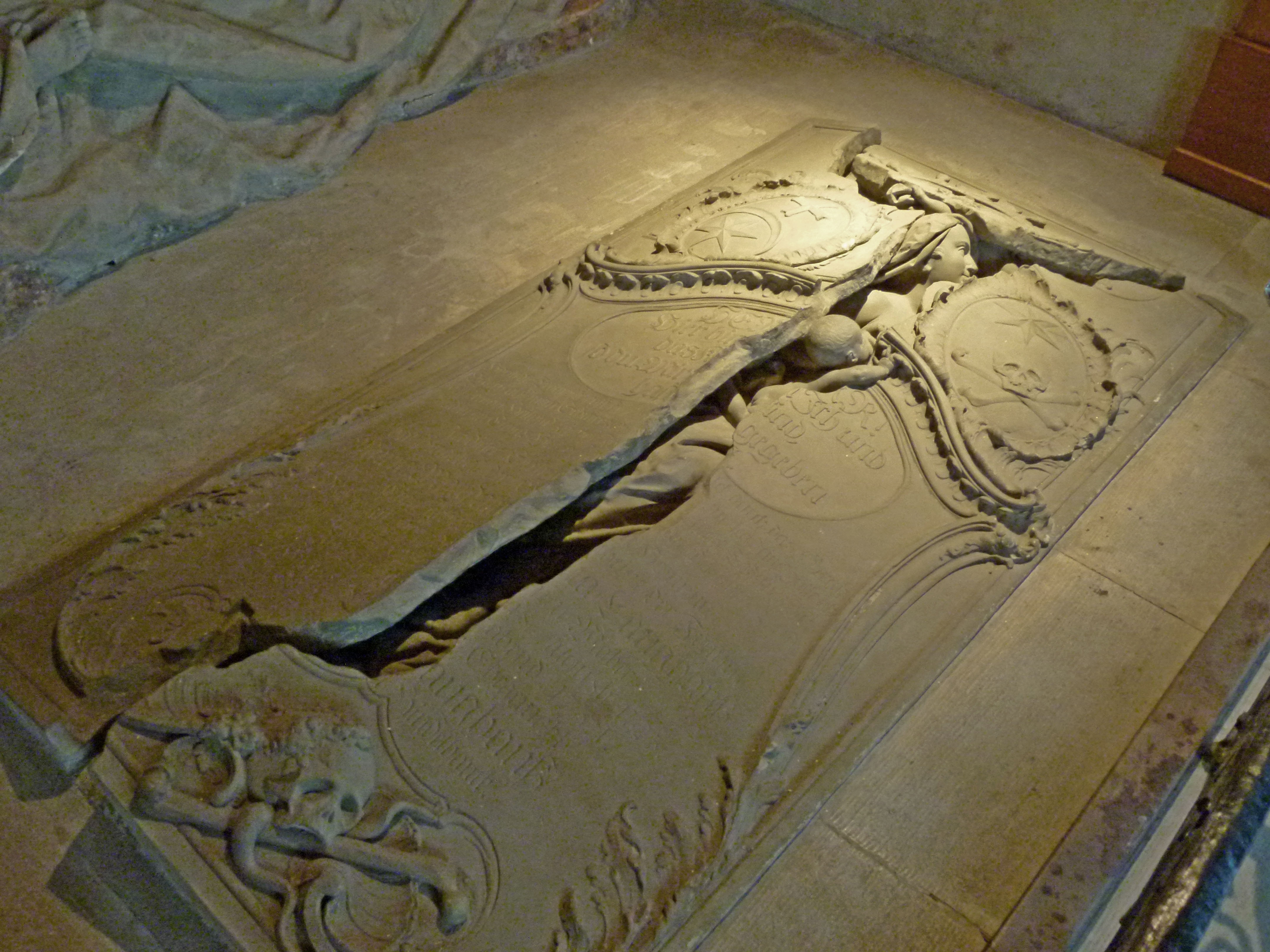
Tomb of Maria Magdalena Langhans by Johann August Nahl

Hindelbank is first mentioned in 1275 as Hundelwanc.

The earliest human traces are some possibly neolithic items have been discovered in the village. The remains of a Roman era settlement were discovered at Lindachfeld. The village formed the center of a small lower court. Beginning in 1347 the village and its court passed through the hands of a number of local nobles as it was sold, divided and inherited repeatedly. In 1406 the village was acquired by Bern and the court continued to pass through the hands of Bernese nobles. After the 1798 French invasion, under the Helvetic Republic the local court was dissolved. Five years later, under the Act of Mediation, it became part of the district of Burgdorf.

The village church was first mentioned in 1275. The old church was replaced with a new building in 1514-18. The church tower was built almost a century and a half later in 1666-68. After a fire in 1911, the building was repaired and renovated. Two monumental tombs were carved in the church by Johann August Nahl.

The village converted to mechanized farming relatively early. In 1878 the regional Dampfdresch-Genossenschaft or steam farming cooperative was established in the village. The dairy and potato distillery in the village led to the creation, in 1888, of a yeast factory. Several other factories opened as well, including a biscuit factory in 1920, a gravel mine in 1960 and a laundry. In the 1960s a freight yard opened which took advantage of the nearby A1 motorway. Good transportation links, including the motorway and the railroad, have allowed the village's population to grow rapidly. While several factories were built in the early 20th century, in the later half century the population grew while industry remained constant. Today many residents commute to jobs in neighboring towns.

The first village school opened in 1662, while the current schoolhouse was built in 1903. In 1839, the rectory was converted into a teacher training school which remained in operation until it relocated to Thun in 1918.

In 1721-25 Schultheiss Hieronymus von Erlach built an elegant manor house known as Hindelbank Castle near the ruins of the old castle in Wiler. During the 18th century the castle became an internationally renowned center of high society. In 1866 Robert von Erlach sold the castle's lands to a private party, while the castle was sold to the Canton of Bern. The canton built a poorhouse and in 1896 a women's prison on the castle grounds. The castle was used as an administrative center.

=== Mötschwil ===
Mötschwil was first mentioned in 1328 as Mötschwile. Until 1910 it was known as Mötschwil-Schleumen.

The oldest trace of a settlement in the area is a La Tène cemetery. Politically and judicially, the village of Mötschwil, Schleumen and Grüt were part of the village of Alchenflüh. However, they were part of the parish of Hindelbank and part of the military district of Zollikofen. In 1331 Fraubrunnen Abbey became one of the large land owners in the villages.

Starting in 1804, Mötschwil Lyssach and Rohrmoos (part of the Oberburg municipality) formed a school district. They built a school in the settlement of Kreuzweg in 1806. Despite being located close to the railroad stations of Hindelbank and Lyssach the municipality remained largely rural and agricultural.

== Geography ==
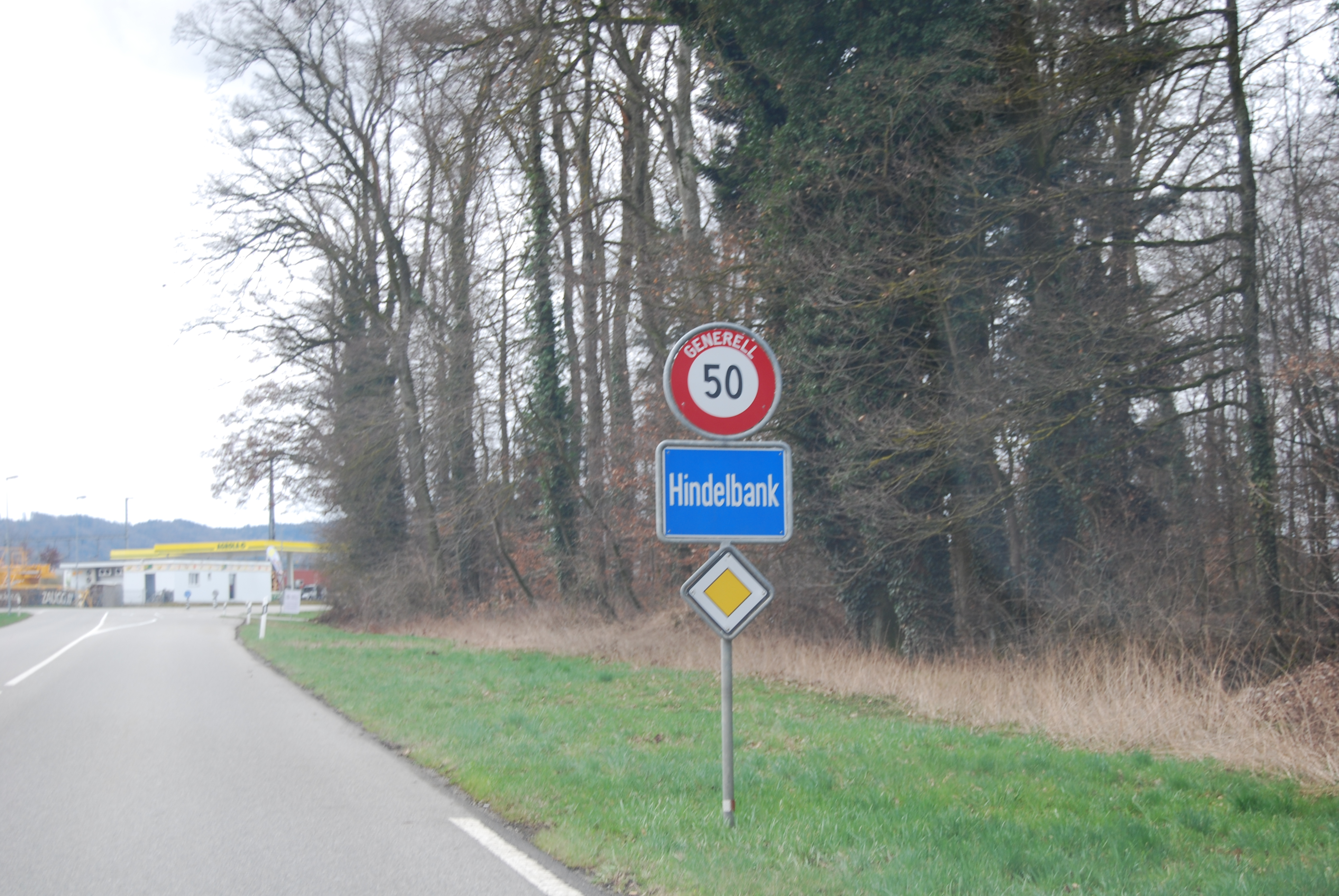
Entrance to the village

Aerial view by Walter Mittelholzer (1922)

Hindelbank has an area of 9.7 km^{2} (3.75 sq mi). Of this area, 4.09 km^{2} (1.58 mi^{2}) or 60.8% is used for agricultural purposes, while 1.49 km^{2} (0.58 mi^{2}) or 22.1% is forested. Of the rest of the land, 1.1 km^{2} (0.42 mi^{2}) or 16.3% is settled (buildings or roads), 0.03 km^{2} (7.4 acres) or 0.4% is either rivers or lakes and 0.01 km^{2} (2.5 acres) or 0.1% is unproductive land.

Of the built up area, industrial buildings made up 1.3% of the total area while housing and buildings made up 5.9% and transportation infrastructure made up 7.4%. Out of the forested land, all of the forested land area is covered with heavy forests. Of the agricultural land, 51.4% is used for growing crops and 8.9% is pastures. All the water in the municipality is flowing water.

Hindelbank includes the Ribbon road village of Hindelbank and the women's prison in Wiler.

On 31 December 2009 Amtsbezirk Burgdorf, the municipality's former district, was dissolved. On the following day, 1 January 2010, it joined the newly created Verwaltungskreis Emmental.

== Coat of arms ==
The blazon of the municipal coat of arms is Azure a Hind Argent statant on a Base Or.

== Demographics ==
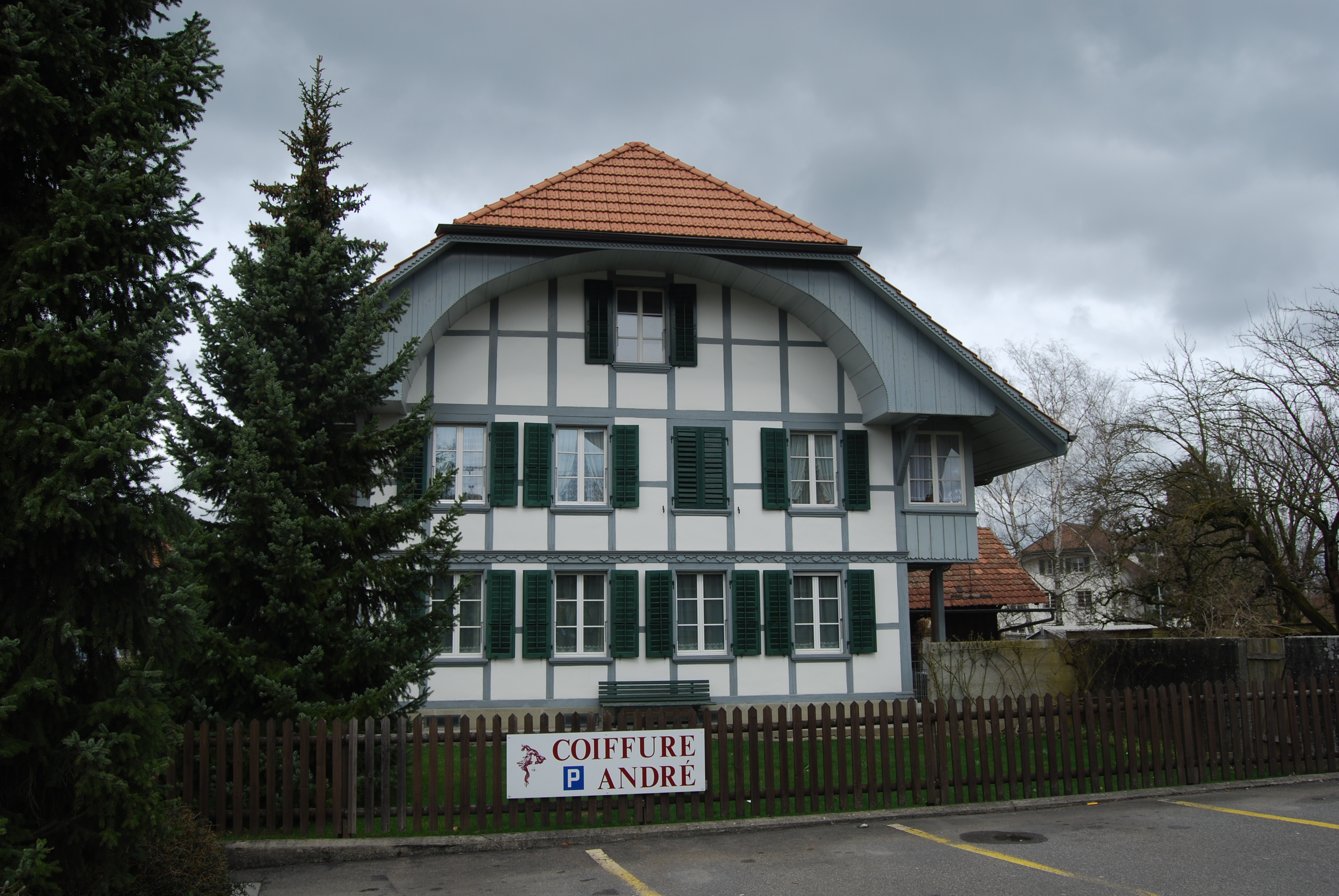
Half-timbered house in Hindelbank

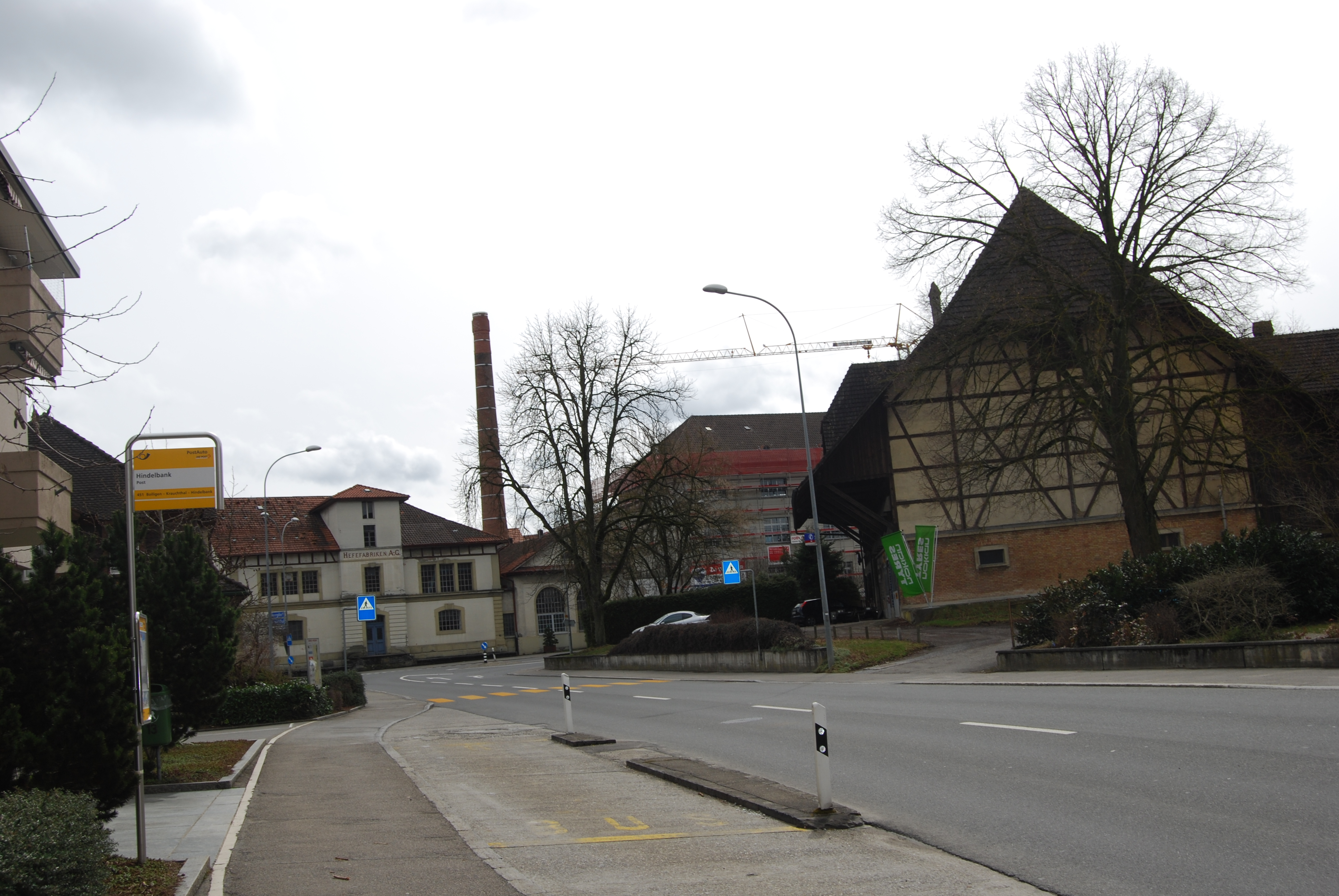
Hindelbank village center

Hindelbank has a population (as of December 2020) of 2,519. As of 2010, 7.8% of the population are resident foreign nationals. Over the last 10 years (2000-2010) the population has changed at a rate of 7.2%. Migration accounted for 0.6%, while births and deaths accounted for 3.5%.

Most of the population (as of 2000) speaks German (1,857 or 92.9%) as their first language, French is the second most common (23 or 1.2%) and Portuguese is the third (17 or 0.9%). There are 12 people who speak Italian and 1 person who speaks Romansh.

As of 2008, the population was 49.3% male and 50.7% female. The population was made up of 924 Swiss men (45.0% of the population) and 88 (4.3%) non-Swiss men. There were 969 Swiss women (47.2%) and 73 (3.6%) non-Swiss women. Of the population in the municipality, 428 or about 21.4% were born in Hindelbank and lived there in 2000. There were 947 or 47.4% who were born in the same canton, while 322 or 16.1% were born somewhere else in Switzerland, and 219 or 11.0% were born outside of Switzerland.

As of 2010, children and teenagers (0–19 years old) make up 20.6% of the population, while adults (20–64 years old) make up 62.8% and seniors (over 64 years old) make up 16.6%.

As of 2000, there were 793 people who were single and never married in the municipality. There were 996 married individuals, 111 widows or widowers and 100 individuals who are divorced.

As of 2000, there were 236 households that consist of only one person and 50 households with five or more people. In 2000, a total of 784 apartments (92.5% of the total) were permanently occupied, while 41 apartments (4.8%) were seasonally occupied and 23 apartments (2.7%) were empty. As of 2010, the construction rate of new housing units was 1 new units per 1000 residents. The vacancy rate for the municipality, in 2011, was 0.5%.

The historical population is given in the following chart:

== Heritage sites of national significance ==
The church, the rectory and Hindelbank Castle are listed as Swiss heritage site of national significance. The grounds and land surrounding the castle and the hamlet of Mötschwil are part of the Inventory of Swiss Heritage Sites.

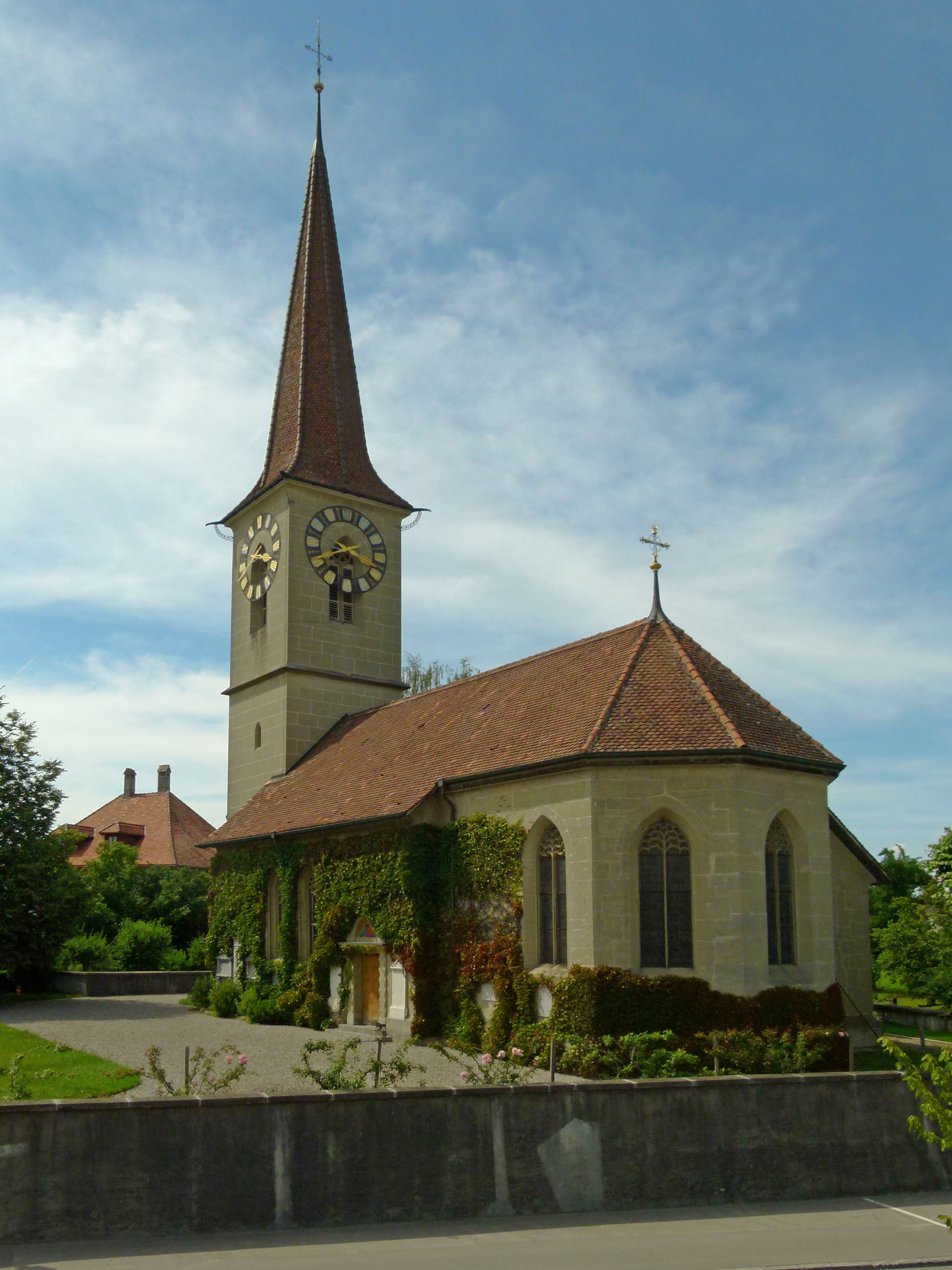
Hindelbank village church

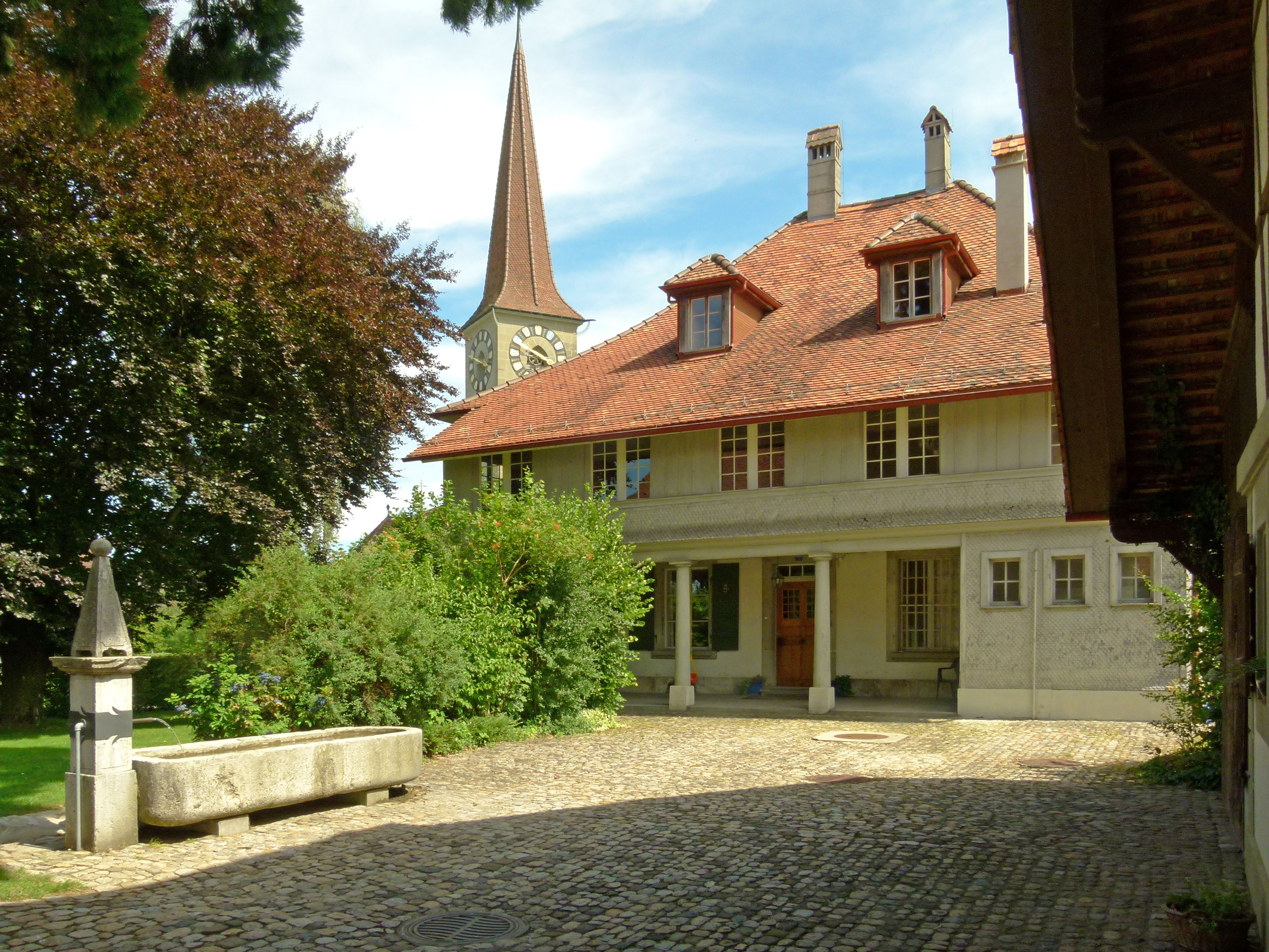
Hindelbank rectory

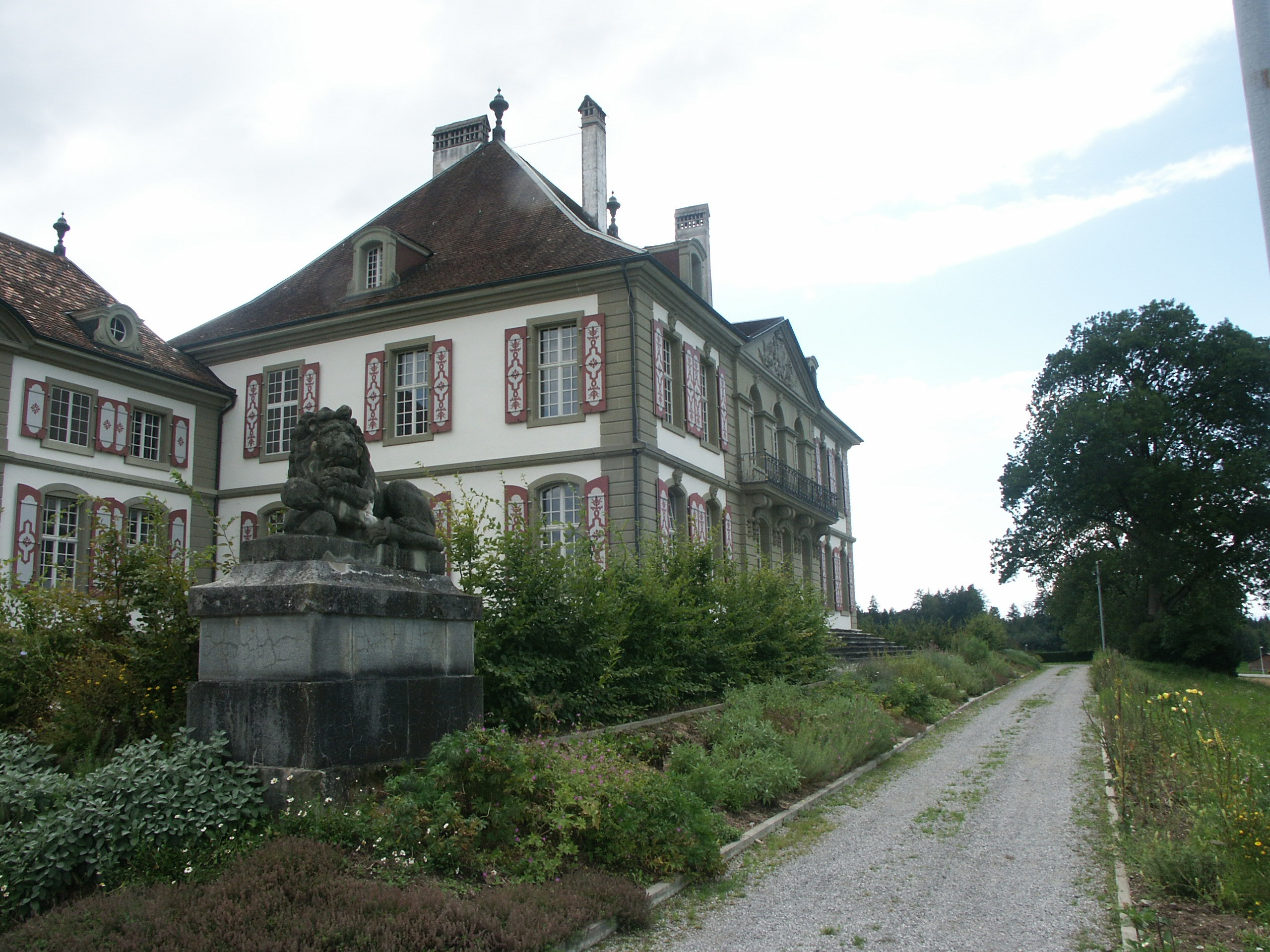
Hindelbank Castle

== Politics ==
In the 2011 federal election the most popular party was the Swiss People's Party (SVP) which received 33.2% of the vote. The next three most popular parties were the Conservative Democratic Party (BDP) (19%), the Social Democratic Party (SP) (14.8%) and the Green Party (6.2%). In the federal election, a total of 760 votes were cast, and the voter turnout was 48.7%.

== Economy ==
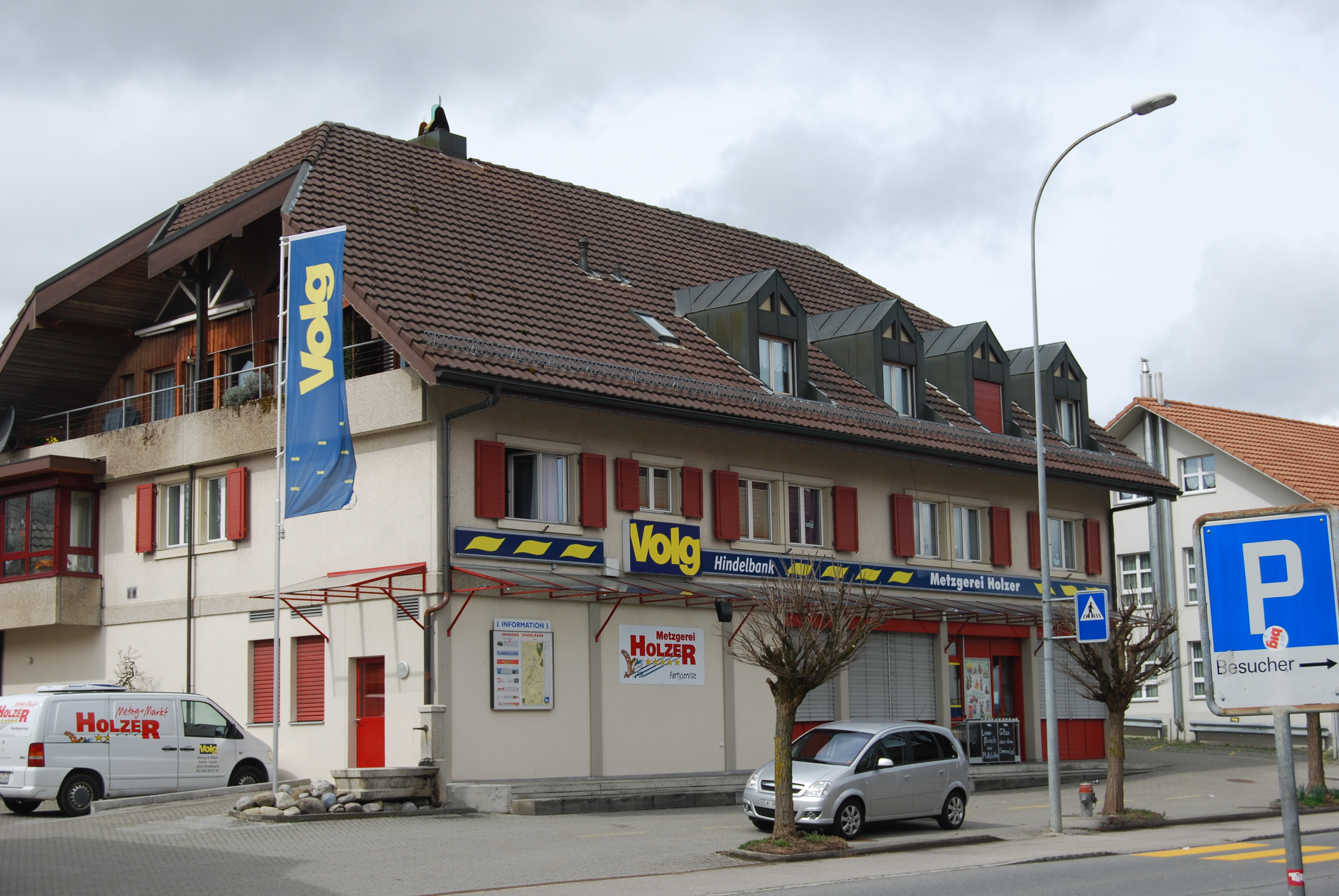
Volg supermarket in Hindelbank

As of 2011, Hindelbank had an unemployment rate of 2.18%. As of 2008, there were a total of 820 people employed in the municipality. Of these, there were 57 people employed in the primary economic sector and about 17 businesses involved in this sector. 172 people were employed in the secondary sector and there were 24 businesses in this sector. 591 people were employed in the tertiary sector, with 81 businesses in this sector.

In 2008 there were a total of 650 full-time equivalent jobs. The number of jobs in the primary sector was 36, all of which were in agriculture. The number of jobs in the secondary sector was 158 of which 44 or (27.8%) were in manufacturing, 49 or (31.0%) were in mining and 61 (38.6%) were in construction. The number of jobs in the tertiary sector was 456. In the tertiary sector; 143 or 31.4% were in wholesale or retail sales or the repair of motor vehicles, 13 or 2.9% were in the movement and storage of goods, 19 or 4.2% were in a hotel or restaurant, 5 or 1.1% were in the information industry, 5 or 1.1% were the insurance or financial industry, 43 or 9.4% were technical professionals or scientists, 30 or 6.6% were in education and 44 or 9.6% were in health care.

In 2000, there were 444 workers who commuted into the municipality and 780 workers who commuted away. The municipality is a net exporter of workers, with about 1.8 workers leaving the municipality for every one entering. Of the working population, 20.9% used public transportation to get to work, and 49.4% used a private car.

== Religion ==
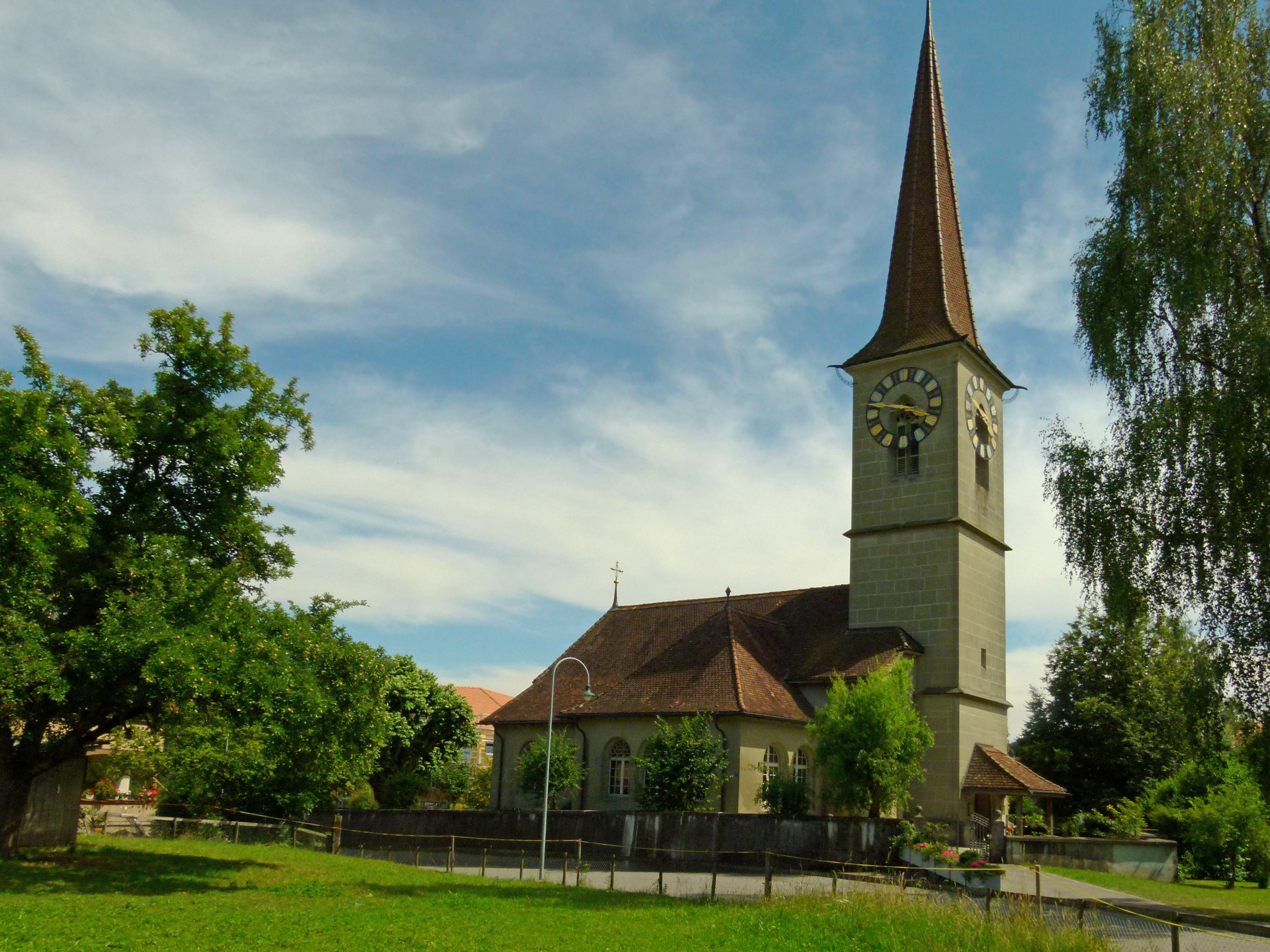
Hindelbank village church

From the 2000 census, 208 or 10.4% were Roman Catholic, while 1,448 or 72.4% belonged to the Swiss Reformed Church. Of the rest of the population, there were 17 members of an Orthodox church (or about 0.85% of the population), and there were 180 individuals (or about 9.00% of the population) who belonged to another Christian church. There were 6 individuals (or about 0.30% of the population) who were Jewish, and 51 (or about 2.55% of the population) who were Islamic. There were 7 individuals who were Buddhist, 13 individuals who were Hindu and 1 individual who belonged to another church. 104 (or about 5.20% of the population) belonged to no church, are agnostic or atheist, and 54 individuals (or about 2.70% of the population) did not answer the question.

== Education ==
In Hindelbank about 864 or (43.2%) of the population have completed non-mandatory upper secondary education, and 250 or (12.5%) have completed additional higher education (either university or a Fachhochschule). Of the 250 who completed tertiary schooling, 73.2% were Swiss men, 18.4% were Swiss women, 4.0% were non-Swiss men and 4.4% were non-Swiss women.

The Canton of Bern school system provides one year of non-obligatory Kindergarten, followed by six years of Primary school. This is followed by three years of obligatory lower Secondary school where the students are separated according to ability and aptitude. Following the lower Secondary students may attend additional schooling or they may enter an apprenticeship.

During the 2010-11 school year, there were a total of 350 students attending classes in Hindelbank. There were 2 kindergarten classes with a total of 37 students in the municipality. Of the kindergarten students, 2.7% were permanent or temporary residents of Switzerland (not citizens) and 5.4% have a different mother language than the classroom language. The municipality had 6 primary classes and 126 students. Of the primary students, 17.5% were permanent or temporary residents of Switzerland (not citizens) and 13.5% have a different mother language than the classroom language. During the same year, there were 11 lower secondary classes with a total of 187 students. There were 7.0% who were permanent or temporary residents of Switzerland (not citizens) and 7.0% have a different mother language than the classroom language.

As of 2000, there were 111 students in Hindelbank who came from another municipality, while 54 residents attended schools outside the municipality.

Hindelbank is home to the Gemeindebibliothek Hindelbank (municipal library of Hindelbank). The library has (as of 2008) 5,400 books or other media, and loaned out 5,095 items in the same year. It was open a total of 360 days with average of 7.5 hours per week during that year.

== Transportation ==
The municipality has a railway station, Hindelbank, on the Olten–Bern line. It has regular service to Bern, Thun, Langnau i.E., Solothurn, and Sumiswald-Grünen.
