= Stalden im Emmental =

Former municipality in the canton of Bern, Switzerland

- Former municipality
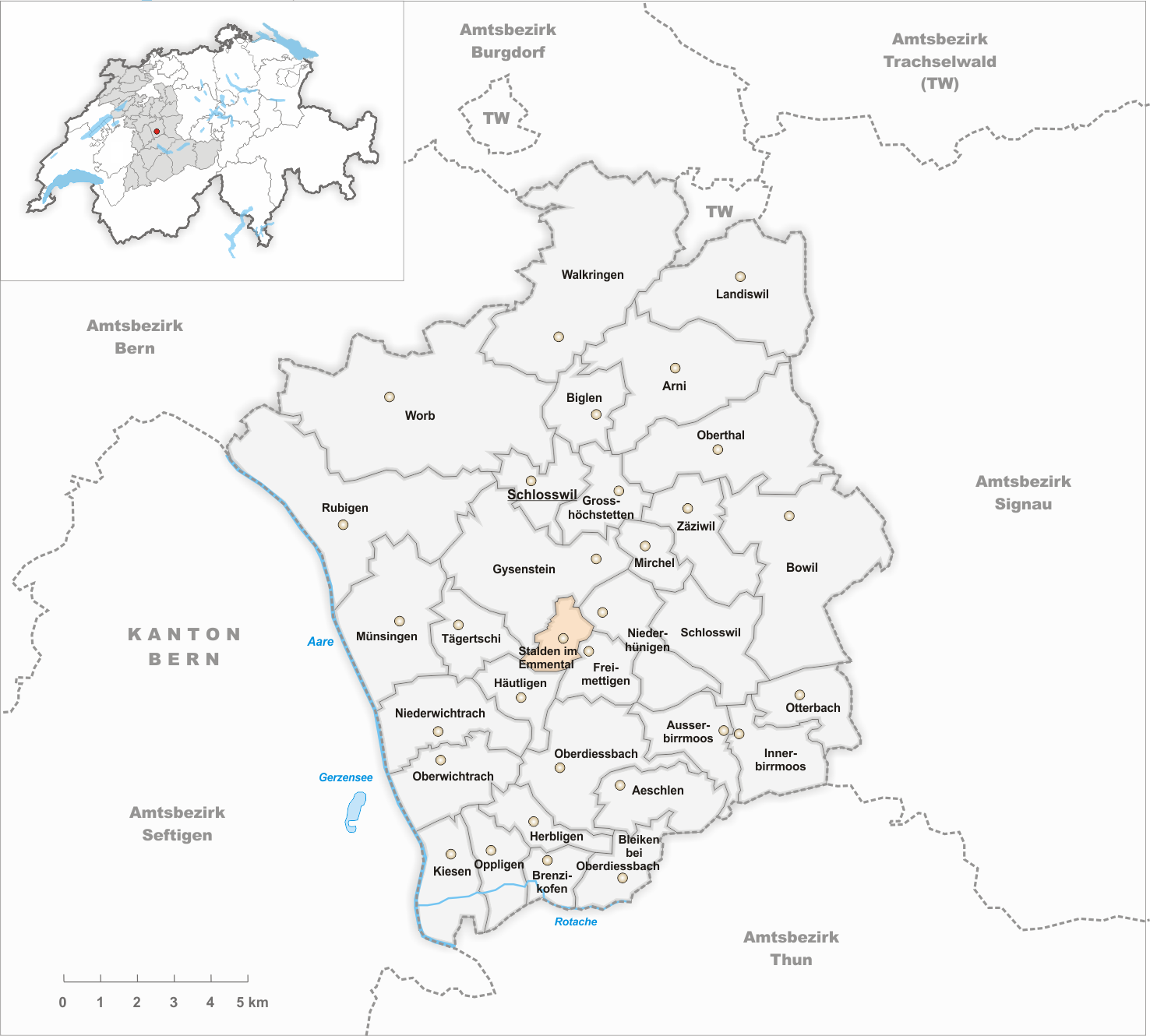
- Municipal boundaries before the merger of 1 January 1933
- Coordinates: 46.8713°N 7.6211°E
- Country: Switzerland
- Canton: Bern
- District: Bern-Mittelland

Area
  - Total: 1.86 km^{2} (0.72 sq mi)
- Elevation: 657 m (2,156 ft)

Population (1930)
  - Total: 943
- Postal code: 3510

Stalden im Emmental is an Ortschaft in the municipality of Konolfingen, in the Bern-Mittelland administrative district of the canton of Bern, Switzerland. A former municipality, it merged with Gysenstein to form the municipality of Konolfingen on 1 January 1933.

== History ==
Stalden im Emmental comprised the village of Stalden and the hamlet of Ämligen, which was transferred to Tägertschi in 1923. It was first mentioned as Stalden in 1258. The population was 99 in 1764, 274 in 1850, 447 in 1900, and 943 in 1930.

Until 1798 Stalden im Emmental belonged to the city court of Bern and to the lower part of the regional court of Konolfingen. From 1803 it was part of the Oberamt and, from 1831 to 2009, of the district (Amtsbezirk) of Konolfingen, forming a political municipality from 1831 to 1932. Until the construction of the branch church in Stalden in 1898, the village belonged ecclesiastically to the Tägertschi quarter in the parish of Münsingen. In 1911 it separated from Münsingen to form the independent parish of Stalden im Emmental, which was renamed Konolfingen after the merger with Gysenstein in 1934.

The railway station on the Bern–Langnau–Lucerne line was built in 1864. With the establishment of the Berneralpen Milchgesellschaft near the station in 1892, on the border with Gysenstein, a new village center developed.

The medieval moated castle of the Senn von Münsingen, east of Stalden, was replaced in 1554 by Hünigen Castle, built for Niklaus von Scharnachtal. From 1588 to 1922 it was the summer residence of the Bern patrician family von May. In 1922 the Evangelical Society of the canton of Bern acquired the castle and converted it into a hotel, which continued in private ownership after changes of hands in 2011 and 2019.

== Bibliography ==
- Hans Schmocker, Konolfingen. Texte und Bilder über eine bernische Gemeinde, 1983
- Jean-Pierre Anderegg, Bauinventar der Gemeinde Konolfingen. Aufnahme des erhaltenswerten Baubestandes, 1990
