= Gysenstein =

Former municipality in the canton of Bern, Switzerland

- Former municipality
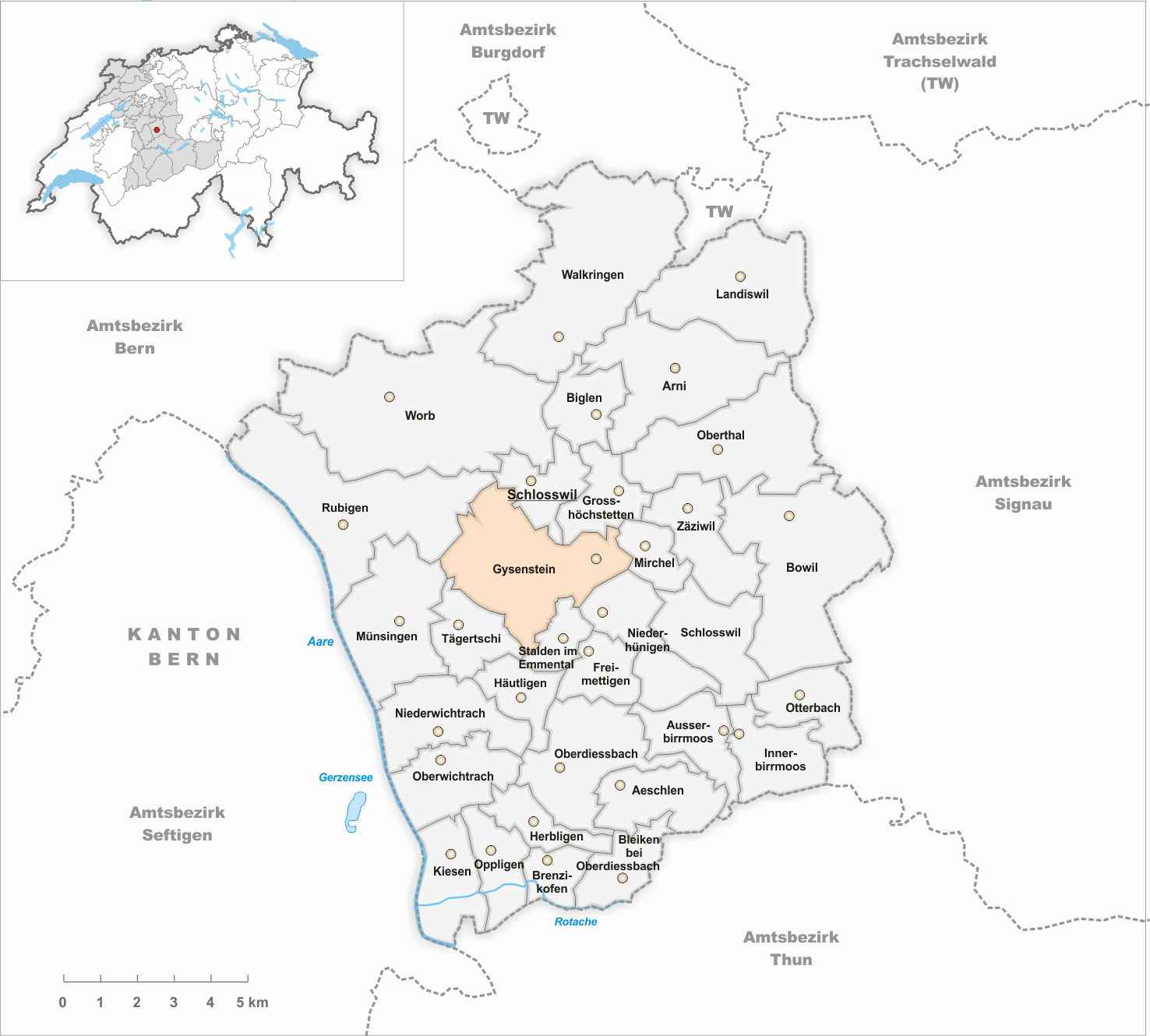
- Municipal boundaries before the merger of 1 January 1933
- Coordinates: 46.8902°N 7.5915°E
- Country: Switzerland
- Canton: Bern
- District: Bern-Mittelland

Area
  - Total: 9.68 km^{2} (3.74 sq mi)
- Elevation: 738 m (2,421 ft)

Population (1930)
  - Total: 2,004
- Postal code: 3503

Gysenstein is a settlement (Ortschaft) in the municipality of Konolfingen, in the Bern-Mittelland administrative district of the canton of Bern, Switzerland. A former municipality, it was merged with Stalden im Emmental to form the new municipality of Konolfingen on 1 January 1933.

== History ==
The residents' municipality (Einwohnergemeinde) of Gysenstein was made up of four local communities (Ortsgemeinden)—Gysenstein, Konolfingen (the two of which were also school communities), Ursellen, and Hötschigen—and comprised, besides these villages, that of Herolfingen, together with the hamlets of Niedergysenstein, Buchli, Hürnberg, and Ballenbühl. It was first mentioned as Gisenstein in 1226. The population was 632 in 1764, 1,353 in 1850, 1,583 in 1900, and 2,004 in 1930.

Isolated Neolithic and Bronze Age finds were discovered at Gysenstein, a tumulus with traces of burning at Herolfingen, and a possible prehistoric earthwork south of Gysenstein on the Bachsbühl. Until 1798 Gysenstein was one of the four lower-court districts of the lordship of Wil. As the Gysenstein quarter it belonged ecclesiastically to Münsingen; after the construction of the branch church in Stalden (1911), the Gysenstein school community remained with Münsingen and only joined the parish of Konolfingen in 1958. The Gysenstein area still stands out today as agricultural in character, in contrast to the more industrial rest of Konolfingen.

== Bibliography ==
- Schmocker, Hans (1983). Konolfingen: Texte und Bilder über eine bernische Gemeinde [Konolfingen: Texts and pictures about a Bernese municipality] (in German). Bern: Einwohnergemeinde Konolfingen.
