= Monika Steiner =

American painter

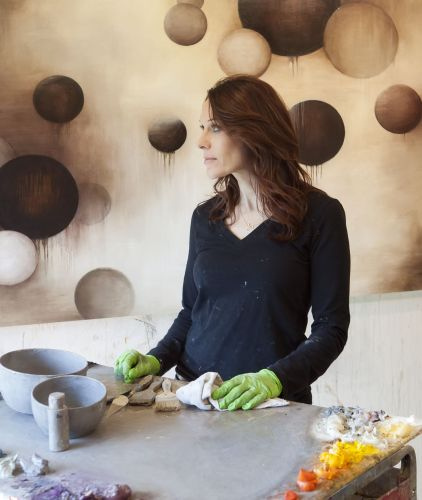
- Born: 1972 (age 53–54); Gysenstein, Switzerland
- Education: University of Bern, Sonoma State University
- Known for: Painting, Sculpture
- Movement: Abstract art

Monika Steiner (born 1972) is an artist and sculptor that lives in Fairfax, California.

== Personal life ==
Monika Steiner was born in 1972 in Gysenstein, Switzerland. She earned a Bachelor of Arts and Teaching Credential at the University of Bern, and became a teacher at Bönigen elementary school, where she incorporated art into her classroom. In 2000 Steiner moved to the United States where she earned a Bachelor of Fine Arts at Sonoma State University. She currently splits her time between northern California and Bern. Her art at this time dealt with her internal struggles, such as the difficulty of experiencing and adapting to culture shock.

== Career ==
The December 2006 showing of 11 pieces at the Bank of America Center in San Francisco, CA (since renamed 555 California Street), called Confluence, was influential in launching her art career.

In 2008 she held an exhibition at the Dorfmusem Bönigen. She had originally taught in this town as a schoolteacher.

As an abstract artist, Steiner describes her work as an outward expression of her innermost thoughts and feelings, a tangible expression of personal memories, situations, moments and feelings. "I am attracted to spheres because they are nature's most perfect shape - requiring the least amount of structure to enclose the greatest possible volume. I am amazed by their ability to conjure entities as massive as planets or as small as subatomic particles."

Rather than traditional canvas, Steiner prefers birchwood platforms prepared with rabbit-skin glue for its hard, smooth surface. In addition to painting, Steiner sculpts in bronze, engaging in the ancient lost-wax casting process integral to working with the medium.

In 2011 Steiner was invited to speak at TEDx Silicon Valley at Stanford University.

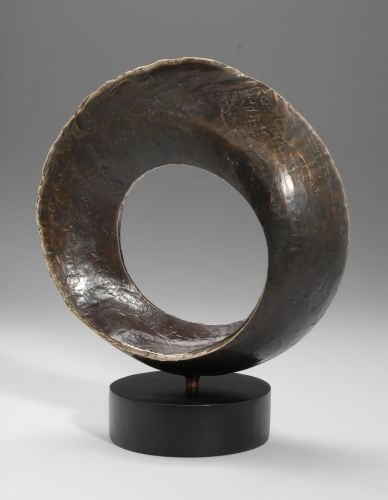
Infinity Sculpture

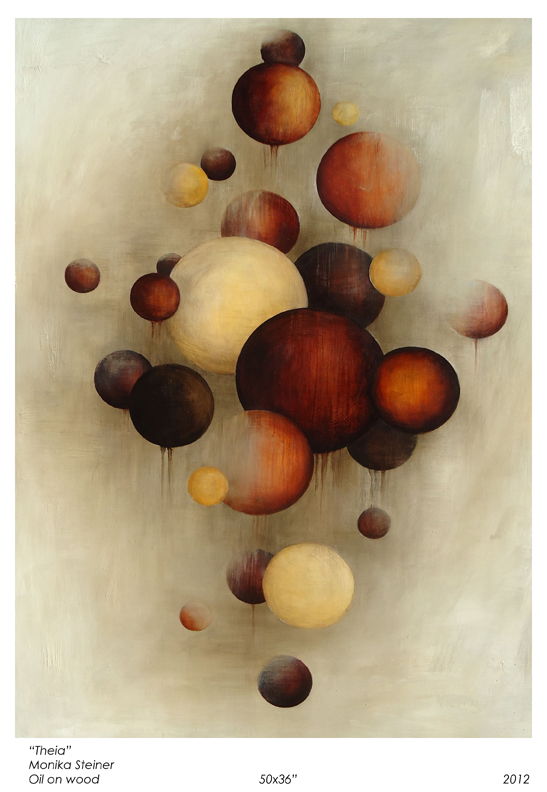
Theia by Monika Steiner

== Major collections ==
Major collections of Steiner's artwork are held by the San Luis Obispo Museum of Art in San Luis Obispo, California and the Maturango Museum in Ridgecrest, California, as well as by the Ashlyn Dyer Foundation, and the Dorfmusem Bönigen.
