= Niederhünigen =

- Municipality
- Flag Coat of arms
- Location of Niederhünigen
- Location within Switzerland Location within Canton of Bern
- Coordinates: 46°53′N 7°38′E
- Country: Switzerland
- Canton: Bern
- District: Bern-Mittelland

Government
  - Executive: Gemeinderat with 6 members
  - Mayor: Gemeindepräsident(in); Anton Schmutz (as of 2026)

Area
  - Total: 5.4 km^{2} (2.1 sq mi)
- Elevation: 685 m (2,247 ft)

Population (December 2020)
  - Total: 657
  - Density: 120/km^{2} (320/sq mi)
- Time zone: UTC+01:00 (CET)
  - Summer (DST): UTC+02:00 (CEST)
- Postal code: 3504
- SFOS number: 617
- ISO 3166 code: CH-BE
- Surrounded by: Freimettigen, Konolfingen, Linden, Mirchel, Oberhünigen
- Website: niederhuenigen.ch

Niederhünigen is a municipality in the Bern-Mittelland administrative district in the canton of Bern in Switzerland.

== History ==
Niederhünigen is first mentioned in 1148 as Huningen inferior.

During the Middle Ages, Niederhünigen village was part of the Herrschaft of Hünigen. It was originally ruled by the Ministerialis (unfree knights in the service of a feudal overlord) family of Senn von Münsingen. By 1380 or 1393 the village was owned by the Bokess family from Thun. After they sold it in 1421, it passed through a number of owners. In the 16th century the medieval Hünigen water castle outside the village was destroyed in a fire. In 1554, Niklaus von Scharnachtal had a new Hünigen Castle built near the mill at Stalden. In 1588, the Bernese patrician von May family acquired the village and castle, which they occupied until 1922. The von May family also ruled the village until the 1798 French invasion and the creation of the Helvetic Republic. In 1933, the village of Stalden, with the castle, merged with Gysenstein to form Konolfingen. Niederhünigen has remained generally rural and agricultural into the 21st century.

Niederhünigen was part of the parish of Münsingen until 1911 when the parish of Stalden was formed. In the following year, the parish was renamed to Konolfingen and Niederhünigen remained a part of the new parish.

== Geography ==
Niederhünigen has an area of 5.42 km^{2} (2.09 sq mi). Of this area, 2.77 km^{2} (1.07 mi^{2}) or 51.2% is used for agricultural purposes, while 2.28 km^{2} (0.88 mi^{2}) or 42.1% is forested. Of the rest of the land, 0.33 km^{2} (0.13 mi^{2}) or 6.1% is settled (buildings or roads).

Of the built up area, housing and buildings made up 4.1% and transportation infrastructure made up 1.8%. Out of the forested land, all of the forested land area is covered with heavy forests. Of the agricultural land, 28.3% is used for growing crops and 20.7% is pastures, while 2.2% is used for orchards or vine crops.

The municipality is located on the Kurzenberg and includes the village of Niederhünigen, the scattered settlement of Holz and part of the Kiesental (Kiesen Valley).

On 31 December 2009 Amtsbezirk Konolfingen, the municipality's former district, was dissolved. On the following day, 1 January 2010, it joined the newly created Verwaltungskreis Bern-Mittelland.

== Coat of arms ==
The blazon of the municipal coat of arms is Gules two Swan Heads addorsed couped Argent beaked Or and in a Chief of the second a Mullet of the first.

== Demographics ==
Niederhünigen has a population (as of December 2020) of 657. As of 2010, 3.3% of the population are resident foreign nationals. Over the last 10 years (2001–2011) the population has changed at a rate of -2%. Migration accounted for -3.7%, while births and deaths accounted for 1.2%.

Most of the population (as of 2000) speaks German (589 or 95.9%) as their first language, Albanian is the second most common (13 or 2.1%) and French is the third (3 or 0.5%).

As of 2008, the population was 48.1% male and 51.9% female. The population was made up of 298 Swiss men (46.1% of the population) and 13 (2.0%) non-Swiss men. There were 327 Swiss women (50.6%) and 8 (1.2%) non-Swiss women. Of the population in the municipality, 176 or about 28.7% were born in Niederhünigen and lived there in 2000. There were 333 or 54.2% who were born in the same canton, while 51 or 8.3% were born somewhere else in Switzerland, and 39 or 6.4% were born outside of Switzerland.

As of 2011, children and teenagers (0–19 years old) make up 25.3% of the population, while adults (20–64 years old) make up 62.7% and seniors (over 64 years old) make up 12%.

As of 2000, there were 300 people who were single and never married in the municipality. There were 277 married individuals, 23 widows or widowers and 14 individuals who are divorced.

As of 2000, there were 59 households that consist of only one person and 28 households with five or more people. In 2000, a total of 216 apartments (87.4% of the total) were permanently occupied, while 18 apartments (7.3%) were seasonally occupied and 13 apartments (5.3%) were empty. As of 2010, the construction rate of new housing units was 3.1 new units per 1000 residents.

The historical population is given in the following chart:

== Politics ==
In the 2011 federal election the most popular party was the Swiss People's Party (SVP) which received 31.9% of the vote. The next three most popular parties were the Conservative Democratic Party (BDP) (16.4%), the Social Democratic Party (SP) (15%) and the Evangelical People's Party (EVP) (8.7%). In the federal election, a total of 262 votes were cast, and the voter turnout was 53.5%.

== Economy ==
As of 2011, Niederhünigen had an unemployment rate of 0.94%. As of 2008, there were a total of 115 people employed in the municipality. Of these, there were 54 people employed in the primary economic sector and about 20 businesses involved in this sector. 38 people were employed in the secondary sector and there were 8 businesses in this sector. 23 people were employed in the tertiary sector, with 6 businesses in this sector. There were 332 residents of the municipality who were employed in some capacity, of which females made up 43.1% of the workforce.

In 2008 there were a total of 83 full-time equivalent jobs. The number of jobs in the primary sector was 34, all of which were in agriculture. The number of jobs in the secondary sector was 34 of which 13 or (38.2%) were in manufacturing and 21 (61.8%) were in construction. The number of jobs in the tertiary sector was 15. In the tertiary sector; 1 was in wholesale or retail sales or the repair of motor vehicles and 10 or 66.7% were in education.

In 2000, there were 25 workers who commuted into the municipality and 276 workers who commuted away. The municipality is a net exporter of workers, with about 11.0 workers leaving the municipality for every one entering. Of the working population, 19.6% used public transportation to get to work, and 55.1% used a private car.

== Religion ==
From the 2000 census, 493 or 80.3% belonged to the Swiss Reformed Church, while 27 or 4.4% were Roman Catholic. Of the rest of the population, there was 1 member of an Orthodox church, and there were 84 individuals (or about 13.68% of the population) who belonged to another Christian church. There were 13 (or about 2.12% of the population) who were Islamic. There was 1 person who was Buddhist and 5 individuals who were Hindu. 21 (or about 3.42% of the population) belonged to no church, are agnostic or atheist, and 11 individuals (or about 1.79% of the population) did not answer the question.

== Education ==
In Niederhünigen about 248 or (40.4%) of the population have completed non-mandatory upper secondary education, and 62 or (10.1%) have completed additional higher education (either university or a Fachhochschule). Of the 62 who completed tertiary schooling, 72.6% were Swiss men, 19.4% were Swiss women.

The Canton of Bern school system provides one year of non-obligatory Kindergarten, followed by six years of Primary school. This is followed by three years of obligatory lower Secondary school where the students are separated according to ability and aptitude. Following the lower Secondary students may attend additional schooling or they may enter an apprenticeship.

During the 2010–11 school year, there were a total of 79 students attending classes in Niederhünigen. There was one kindergarten class with a total of 8 students in the municipality. The municipality had 3 primary classes and 57 students. Of the primary students, 3.5% were permanent or temporary residents of Switzerland (not citizens) and 3.5% have a different mother language than the classroom language. During the same year, there was one lower secondary class with a total of 14 students. There were 7.1% who were permanent or temporary residents of Switzerland (not citizens) and 21.4% have a different mother language than the classroom language.

As of 2000, there were 13 students in Niederhünigen who came from another municipality, while 31 residents attended schools outside the municipality.
