= Ursina =

Ursina can refer to:

- 860 Ursina, a minor planet orbiting the Sun.
- Ursina, Pennsylvania, a borough in Somerset County, Pennsylvania, United States.
- Vrsno, Kobarid, a village in western Slovenia, named Ursina in Italian
- Ursina (company), a former Swiss dairy company that merged into Nestlé
