= Ursina (company) =

Former Swiss dairy company

- Formerly: Berneralpen Milchgesellschaft
- Company type: Joint-stock company
- Industry: Dairy
- Founded: 1892 in Bern, Switzerland (as Berneralpen Milchgesellschaft)
- Founder: César Ritz
- Fate: Merged with Nestlé (1971)
- Headquarters: Konolfingen, Switzerland
- Products: Condensed milk, infant formula, dairy products
- Number of employees: over 8,000 (1966)

Ursina, founded as the Berneralpen Milchgesellschaft, was a Swiss dairy company known for its "Bärenmarke" condensed milk. It grew into an international group before merging with Nestlé in 1971.

== History ==
To make commercial use of a patent for the sterilization of milk in the hotel industry, the hotel pioneer César Ritz founded the Berneralpen Milchgesellschaft in Bern in 1892. Prominent shareholders included Emanuel Muheim, Jean von Wattenwyl, Georges Marcuard, Hans Pfyffer von Altishofen, Numa Droz, and Auguste Escoffier. In its founding year the company began operations at Stalden im Emmental with four workers and a share capital of 400,000 francs, and soon became the largest employer in the Konolfingen area.

In 1895 the milk-processing business—which from 1901 also produced Staldencrème—achieved its breakthrough with an exportable unsweetened condensed milk ("Bärenmarke"). The company expanded to Bavaria in 1900 and, with the Compagnie générale du lait, to France in 1917. In 1926 production and distribution in Switzerland were combined in the operating company Berneralpen Milchgesellschaft and, together with the foreign operations, brought into the holding company Ursina AG (based in Geneva, then Stans, and from 1934 Konolfingen), which made possible its expansion into a large international group.

With more than 8,000 employees, the group's turnover reached 1 billion francs in 1966. In 1970 the firm comprised 24 companies, including Guigoz SA of Vuadens (infant formula) and Disch AG of Othmarsingen (confectionery), as well as further operations in Germany, France, Italy, the Netherlands, Great Britain, and Australia. In 1970 it took over the Franck group, adopting the new company name Ursina-Franck, and in 1971 it merged with Nestlé.

== Bibliography ==
- 75 Jahre Ursina, [1967]
- H. Schmocker, Konolfingen, 1983, 26–28, 87–92
- J. Heer, Nestlé, 1991, 339–360
