= Oberhünigen =

- Municipality
- Flag Coat of arms
- Location of Oberhünigen
- Location within Switzerland Location within Canton of Bern
- Coordinates: 46°53′N 7°40′E
- Country: Switzerland
- Canton: Bern
- District: Bern-Mittelland

Government
  - Executive: Gemeinderat with 5 members
  - Mayor: Gemeindepräsident(in); Christa Krähenbühl (as of 2026)

Area
  - Total: 6.0 km^{2} (2.3 sq mi)
- Elevation: 852 m (2,795 ft)

Population (December 2020)
  - Total: 316
  - Density: 53/km^{2} (140/sq mi)
- Time zone: UTC+01:00 (CET)
  - Summer (DST): UTC+02:00 (CEST)
- Postal code: 3504
- SFOS number: 629
- ISO 3166 code: CH-BE
- Surrounded by: Bowil, Linden, Mirchel, Niederhünigen, Zäziwil
- Website: http://www.oberhuenigen.ch/ SFSO statistics

Oberhünigen is a municipality in the Bern-Mittelland administrative district in the canton of Bern in Switzerland.

== History ==
Oberhünigen is first mentioned in 1148 as Huningen superior. Until 1980 it was an exclave of the municipality of Schlosswil.

Throughout its history, Oberhünigen was a small farming village on the edge of the forest. It was part of the court of Wil until 1834 when it became an exclave of Schlosswil. Even after it left the political municipality of Schlosswil, it remained part of the parish.

== Geography ==
Oberhünigen has an area of 6.01 km^{2} (2.32 sq mi). As of 2012, a total of 2.33 km^{2} (0.90 mi^{2}) or 38.7% is used for agricultural purposes, while 3.43 km^{2} (1.32 mi^{2}) or 57.0% is forested. Of the rest of the land, 0.21 km^{2} (0.081 mi^{2}) or 3.5% is settled (buildings or roads), 0.04 km^{2} (9.9 acres) or 0.7% is either rivers or lakes.

During the same year, housing and buildings made up 1.5% and transportation infrastructure made up 2.0%. Out of the forested land, all of the forested land area is covered with heavy forest. Of the agricultural land, 11.5% is used for growing crops and 26.2% is pastures. All the water in the municipality is flowing water.

The municipality includes the village of Oberhünigen, the hamlet of Äbersold and individual farm houses on the Kurzenberg. Until 1980 it was an exclave of Schlosswil.

More than half of the municipality is covered by the Toppwald (Topp Forest).

On 31 December 2009 Amtsbezirk Konolfingen, the municipality's former district, was dissolved. On the following day, 1 January 2010, it joined the newly created Verwaltungskreis Bern-Mittelland.

== Coat of arms ==
The blazon of the municipal coat of arms is Per fess Sable two Swan Heads issuant Argent beaked Or and of he last.

== Demographics ==
Oberhünigen has a population (as of December 2020) of 316. As of 2010, 1.5% of the population are resident foreign nationals. Over the last 10 years (2001–2011) the population has changed at a rate of -2.1%. Migration accounted for -0.6%, while births and deaths accounted for -0.3%.

Most of the population (as of 2000) speaks German (285 or 96.3%) as their first language, Serbo-Croatian is the second most common (6 or 2.0%) and Dutch is the third (2 or 0.7%). There is 1 person who speaks French.

As of 2008, the population was 46.4% male and 53.6% female. The population was made up of 150 Swiss men (45.2% of the population) and 4 (1.2%) non-Swiss men. There were 177 Swiss women (53.3%) and 1 (0.3%) non-Swiss women. Of the population in the municipality, 106 or about 35.8% were born in Oberhünigen and lived there in 2000. There were 135 or 45.6% who were born in the same canton, while 27 or 9.1% were born somewhere else in Switzerland, and 15 or 5.1% were born outside of Switzerland.

As of 2011, children and teenagers (0–19 years old) make up 26.8% of the population, while adults (20–64 years old) make up 58.2% and seniors (over 64 years old) make up 15.1%.

As of 2000, there were 135 people who were single and never married in the municipality. There were 137 married individuals, 14 widows or widowers and 10 individuals who are divorced.

As of 2000, there were 35 households that consist of only one person and 16 households with five or more people. In 2000, a total of 112 apartments (93.3% of the total) were permanently occupied, while 7 apartments (5.8%) were seasonally occupied and one apartment was empty. The vacancy rate for the municipality, in 2011, was 1.53%.

The historical population is given in the following chart:

== Politics ==
In the 2011 federal election the most popular party was the Swiss People's Party (SVP) which received 43.1% of the vote. The next three most popular parties were the Conservative Democratic Party (BDP) (16.8%), the Federal Democratic Union of Switzerland (EDU) (11.1%) and the Social Democratic Party (SP) (9.1%). In the federal election, a total of 149 votes were cast, and the voter turnout was 60.8%.

== Economy ==
As of 2011, Oberhünigen had an unemployment rate of 0.81%. As of 2008, there were a total of 85 people employed in the municipality. Of these, there were 50 people employed in the primary economic sector and about 22 businesses involved in this sector. 16 people were employed in the secondary sector and there were 4 businesses in this sector. 19 people were employed in the tertiary sector, with 5 businesses in this sector. There were 172 residents of the municipality who were employed in some capacity, of which females made up 40.1% of the workforce.

In 2008 there were a total of 59 full-time equivalent jobs. The number of jobs in the primary sector was 32, all of which were in agriculture. The number of jobs in the secondary sector was 14 of which 11 or (78.6%) were in manufacturing and 2 (14.3%) were in construction. The number of jobs in the tertiary sector was 13. In the tertiary sector; 3 or 23.1% were in wholesale or retail sales or the repair of motor vehicles, 4 or 30.8% were in a hotel or restaurant, 5 or 38.5% were in education.

In 2000, there were 7 workers who commuted into the municipality and 104 workers who commuted away. The municipality is a net exporter of workers, with about 14.9 workers leaving the municipality for every one entering. Of the working population, 11.6% used public transportation to get to work, and 47.7% used a private car.

== Religion ==
From the 2000 census, 222 or 75.0% belonged to the Swiss Reformed Church, while 16 or 5.4% were Roman Catholic. Of the rest of the population, there were 48 individuals (or about 16.22% of the population) who belonged to another Christian church. There were 6 (or about 2.03% of the population) who were Islamic. 17 (or about 5.74% of the population) belonged to no church, are agnostic or atheist, and 11 individuals (or about 3.72% of the population) did not answer the question.

== Education ==
In Oberhünigen about 119 or (40.2%) of the population have completed non-mandatory upper secondary education, and 32 or (10.8%) have completed additional higher education (either university or a Fachhochschule). Of the 32 who completed tertiary schooling, 65.6% were Swiss men, 25.0% were Swiss women.

The Canton of Bern school system provides one year of non-obligatory Kindergarten, followed by six years of Primary school. This is followed by three years of obligatory lower Secondary school where the students are separated according to ability and aptitude. Following the lower Secondary students may attend additional schooling or they may enter an apprenticeship.

During the 2010–11 school year, there were a total of 51 students attending classes in Oberhünigen. There was one kindergarten class with a total of 13 students in the municipality. The municipality had one primary class and 33 students. During the same year, there was one lower secondary class with a total of 5 students.

As of 2000, there were 6 students in Oberhünigen who came from another municipality, while 23 residents attended schools outside the municipality.
