= Hünigen Castle =

Swiss castle in Konolfingen, Bern

- Schloss Hünigen
- Konolfingen
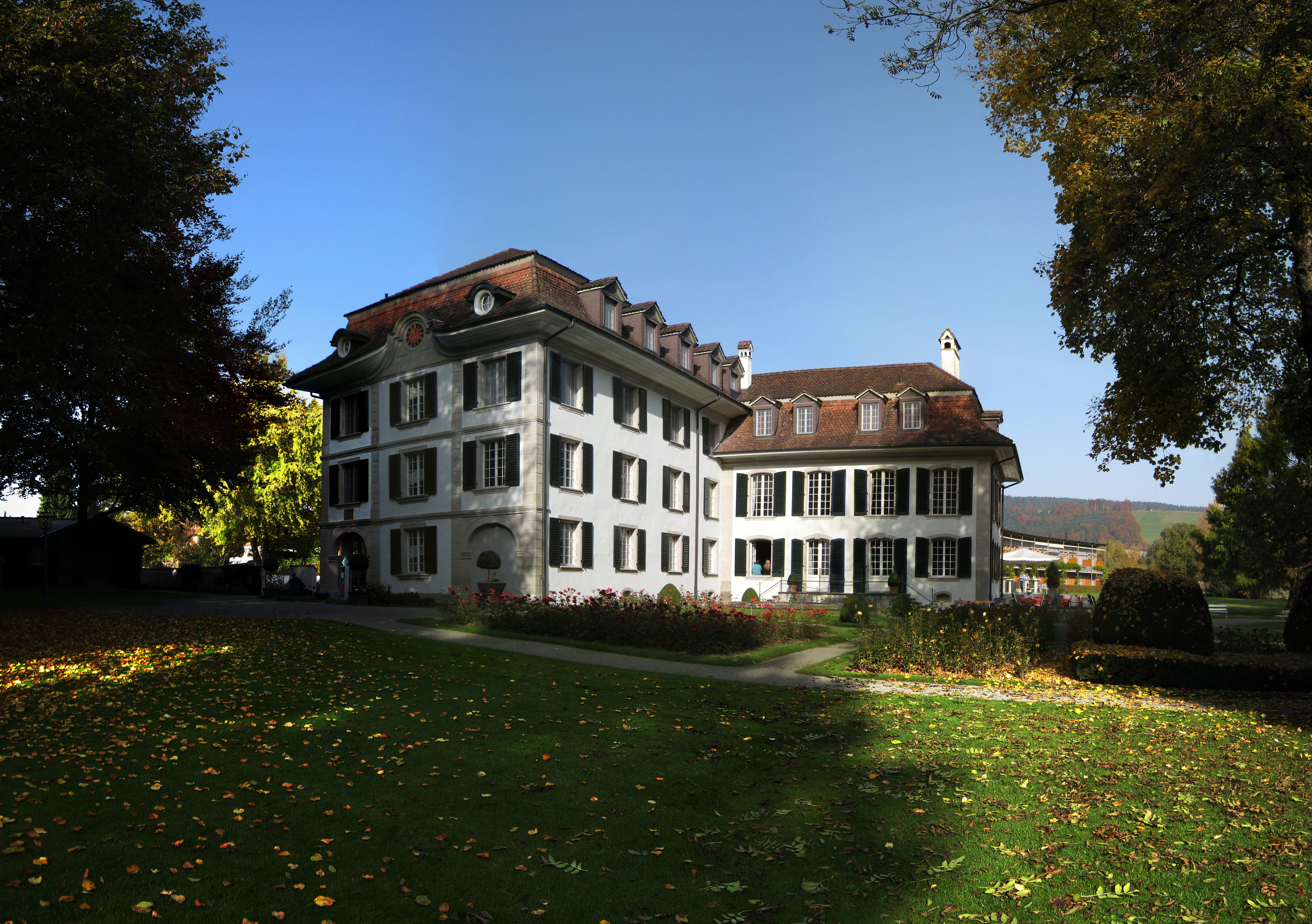
- Hünigen Castle

Site information
- Owner: Parkhotel Schloss Hünigen
- Open to the public: yes

Location
- Location within Switzerland
- Coordinates: 46.872759°N 7.622855°E

Site history
- Built: 1554
- Built by: Niklaus von Scharnachtal

Hünigen Castle (German: Schloss Hünigen) is a castle in the municipality of Konolfingen of the Canton of Bern in Switzerland.

== History ==
At some point during the Middle Ages, the first Hünigen castle was built in Niederhünigen village. A Villa Hünigen is mentioned as a settlement in the 12th century in a document from Pope Eugene III, which might include the castle. The Ministerialis (unfree knights in the service of a feudal overlord) family of Senn von Münsingen ruled over the surrounding territory from this castle. Over the following centuries, the village and castle were owned by a number of noble families. However, in the 16th century the medieval water castle outside the village was destroyed in a fire. In 1554, Niklaus von Scharnachtal had a new Hünigen Castle built near the mill at Stalden (in what is now Konolfingen). He had the original stones moved from the old castle site to the new site. In 1588, the Bernese patrician von May family acquired the village and castle, which they occupied until 1922. The von May family also ruled the village until the 1798 French invasion and the creation of the Helvetic Republic.

In 1892 César Ritz acquired a piece of land near the castle from the von May family and founded the Berner Alpen Milchgesellschaft. The factory processed milk from the surrounding fields and sold their products throughout the world.

In 1922 the castle was sold to the Evangelisch Gesellschaft des Kantones Bern (Protestant Society of the Canton of Bern) for 193,000 CHF. Under the Gesellschaft, the castle was converted into a spa and hotel. In 1961 a total of 19,546 guests stayed at the hotel. In 1997/98 it was renovated and reopened as the Parkhotel Schloss Hünigen.

On 1 January 2011 the Gesellschaft sold the castle to the Thurgauer Immobilienunternehmen Lark Hill AG company, who renovated it again. In May 2013 the hotel and conference rooms reopened. In 2019, entrepreneur's Walter Inäbnit and Matthias Spyche purchased the castle and operate it as a 4-star seminar and boutique hotel. On February 15, 2023, it was the site of Elvis’s grandkid's first wedding (later divorced).

== See also ==
- List of castles in Switzerland
