= Linden, Switzerland =

Linden
- Municipality
- Flag Coat of arms
- Location of Linden
- Location within Switzerland Location within Canton of Bern
- Coordinates: 46°51′N 7°41′E
- Country: Switzerland
- Canton: Bern
- District: Bern-Mittelland

Government
  - Executive: Gemeinderat with 7 members
  - Mayor: Gemeindepräsident(in); Ignaz Margelisch (as of 2026)

Area
  - Total: 13.3 km^{2} (5.1 sq mi)
- Elevation: 916 m (3,005 ft)

Population (December 2020)
  - Total: 1,304
  - Density: 98.0/km^{2} (254/sq mi)
- Time zone: UTC+01:00 (CET)
  - Summer (DST): UTC+02:00 (CEST)
- Postal code: 3673
- SFOS number: 614
- ISO 3166 code: CH-BE
- Surrounded by: Aeschlen, Bowil, Buchholterberg, Freimettigen, Niederhünigen, Oberdiessbach, Oberhünigen, Röthenbach im Emmental
- Website: linden.ch

Linden (German pronunciation: [ˈlɪndn̩]) is a municipality in the Bern-Mittelland administrative district in the canton of Bern in Switzerland.

== History ==
The municipality was formed in 1945 when the former municipalities of Ausserbirrmoos, Innerbirrmoos, and Otterbach merged.

=== Ausserbirrmoos ===
Ausserbirrmoos was the largest in land area of the three communities that formed Linden. It was first mentioned in 1298 as Birmos. Throughout the Middle Ages, it was part of the Herrschaft of Diessbach. Originally, it formed a single community with Innerbirrmoos, but in 1633 the two communities separated to form independent municipalities. It absorbed the land and population of the communities of Schöntal (BE) and Barschwand when they dissolved in 1887. In 1941, before the merger, it had a population of 466.

=== Innerbirrmoos ===
It was mentioned, along with Ausserbirrmoos, in 1298. Around 1399 it became part of the Bernese district of Röthenbach. Then, in 1529 it became part of the Landvogtei of Signau. It separated from Ausserbirrmoos in 1633. For much of its history, the established farmers and the landless sharecroppers fought each other over usage of the commons. Finally, over a decade starting 1778, the city of Bern intervened and ended the conflict. In 1941, it had a population of 558. Today, the village is still mostly agricultural.

=== Otterbach ===
Otterbach is first mentioned in 1236 as Ottirbach. Like Innerbirrmoos, around 1399 it became part of the Bernese district of Röthenbach and in 1529 the Landvogtei of Signau. It was the smallest and poorest of the three municipalities that joined to form Linden. In 1941 it had a population of 310.

=== Linden ===
The hamlet of Linden was first mentioned in 1354. While it was geographically in the center of the three municipalities, it was never an independent municipality itself. All three municipalities, Ausserbirrmoos, Innerbirrmoos, and Otterbach, were part of the parish of Oberdiessbach until 1860, when they broke away to form the parish of Kurzenberg. After the creation of the independent municipality of Linden in 1945, it became the parish of Linden. The parish church was built in the hamlet of Linden in 1848. Since it was in the center of the communities, the local school was also built there. Beginning in the 1970s, a training base for the Swiss Army opened in the community. Today the municipality is still rural and agricultural in character, though about two-thirds of the working population commutes to jobs outside the municipality.

== Geography ==
mini|Linden (BE), General view from the north

mini|Linden (BE) – Aerial view (1954)

Linden has an area of 13.23 km^{2} (5.11 sq mi). Of this area, 8.01 km^{2} (3.09 mi^{2}) or 60.5% is used for agricultural purposes, while 4.34 km^{2} (1.68 mi^{2}) or 32.8% is forested. Of the rest of the land, 0.83 km^{2} (0.32 mi^{2}) or 6.3% is settled (buildings or roads), 0.05 km^{2} (12 acres) or 0.4% is either rivers or lakes and 0.02 km^{2} (4.9 acres) or 0.2% is unproductive land.

Of the built up area, housing and buildings made up 3.2% and transportation infrastructure made up 2.3%. Out of the forested land, 31.6% of the total land area is heavily forested and 1.2% is covered with orchards or small clusters of trees. Of the agricultural land, 11.4% is used for growing crops and 47.5% is pastures, while 1.1% is used for orchards or vine crops. All the water in the municipality is flowing water.

Linden does not have a central village, rather it is composed of scattered houses and settlements on a low hill between the Aare River and the Emme River. It formed from the merger of the formerly independent municipalities of Ausserbirrmoos, Innerbirrmoos and Otterbach in 1945.

On 31 December 2009 Amtsbezirk Konolfingen, the municipality's former district, was dissolved. On the following day, 1 January 2010, it joined the newly created Verwaltungskreis Bern-Mittelland.

== Coat of arms ==
The blazon of the municipal coat of arms is Argent on a Linden Tree Vert trunked proper issuant from a Mount of 3 Coupeaux of the second three Mullets Or. The linden tree, of course, makes this an example of canting arms.

== Demographics ==
Linden has a population (as of December 2020) of 1,304. As of 2010, 4.3% of the population are resident foreign nationals. Over the last 10 years (2001–2011) the population has changed at a rate of 0%. Migration accounted for 0.7%, while births and deaths accounted for -1%.

Most of the population (as of 2000) speaks German (1,262 or 96.6%) as their first language, French is the second most common (25 or 1.9%) and English is the third (3 or 0.2%). There are 2 people who speak Italian and 2 people who speak Romansh.

As of 2008, the population was 50.4% male and 49.6% female. The population was made up of 631 Swiss men (48.0% of the population) and 31 (2.4%) non-Swiss men. There were 626 Swiss women (47.6%) and 26 (2.0%) non-Swiss women. Of the population in the municipality, 610 or about 46.7% were born in Linden and lived there in 2000. There were 449 or 34.4% who were born in the same canton, while 133 or 10.2% were born somewhere else in Switzerland, and 70 or 5.4% were born outside of Switzerland.

As of 2011, children and teenagers (0–19 years old) make up 23.7% of the population, while adults (20–64 years old) make up 57.3% and seniors (over 64 years old) make up 19%.

As of 2000, 549 people were single and never married in the municipality. There were 634 married individuals, 98 widows or widowers and 26 individuals who were divorced.

As of 2000, there were 108 households that consisted of only one person and 62 households with five or more people. In 2000, a total of 411 apartments (88.2% of the total) were permanently occupied, while 41 apartments (8.8%) were seasonally occupied and 14 apartments (3.0%) were empty. The vacancy rate for the municipality, in 2011, was 0.57%.

The historical population is given in the following chart:

== Politics ==
In the 2011 federal election the most popular party was the Swiss People's Party (SVP) which received 60.4% of the vote. The next three most popular parties were the Conservative Democratic Party (BDP) (10.6%), the Federal Democratic Union of Switzerland (EDU) (7.6%) and the Social Democratic Party (SP) (6.1%). In the federal election, a total of 511 votes were cast, and the voter turnout was 48.7%.

== Economy ==
As of 2011, Linden had an unemployment rate of 0.48%. As of 2008, there were a total of 541 people employed in the municipality. Of these, there were 193 people employed in the primary economic sector and about 72 businesses involved in this sector. 143 people were employed in the secondary sector and there were 20 businesses in this sector. 205 people were employed in the tertiary sector, with 31 businesses in this sector. There were 653 residents of the municipality who were employed in some capacity, of which females made up 43.6% of the workforce.

In 2008 there were a total of 389 full-time equivalent jobs. The number of jobs in the primary sector was 101, all of which were in agriculture. The number of jobs in the secondary sector was 126 of which 66 or (52.4%) were in manufacturing, 16 or (12.7%) were in mining and 44 (34.9%) were in construction. The number of jobs in the tertiary sector was 162. In the tertiary sector; 38 or 23.5% were in wholesale or retail sales or the repair of motor vehicles, 2 or 1.2% were in the movement and storage of goods, 12 or 7.4% were in a hotel or restaurant, 2 or 1.2% were the insurance or financial industry, 14 or 8.6% were in education and 8 or 4.9% were in health care.

In 2000, there were 91 workers who commuted into the municipality and 327 workers who commuted away. The municipality is a net exporter of workers, with about 3.6 workers leaving the municipality for every one entering. Of the working population, 4.3% used public transportation to get to work, and 51.3% used a private car.

== Religion ==
From the 2000 census, 1,009 or 77.2% belonged to the Swiss Reformed Church, while 40 or 3.1% were Roman Catholic. Of the rest of the population, there were 5 members of an Orthodox church (or about 0.38% of the population), and there were 110 individuals (or about 8.42% of the population) who belonged to another Christian church. There was 1 individual who was Jewish, and 4 (or about 0.31% of the population) who were Islamic. There were 3 individuals who were Buddhist. 156 (or about 11.94% of the population) belonged to no church, are agnostic or atheist, and 34 individuals (or about 2.60% of the population) did not answer the question.

== Education ==
In Linden about 487 or (37.3%) of the population have completed non-mandatory upper secondary education, and 79 or (6.0%) have completed additional higher education (either university or a Fachhochschule). Of the 79 who completed tertiary schooling, 73.4% were Swiss men, 12.7% were Swiss women, 8.9% were non-Swiss men.

The Canton of Bern school system provides one year of non-obligatory Kindergarten, followed by six years of Primary school. This is followed by three years of obligatory lower Secondary school where the students are separated according to ability and aptitude. Following the lower Secondary students may attend additional schooling or they may enter an apprenticeship.

During the 2010–11 school year, there were a total of 128 students attending classes in Linden. There was one kindergarten class with a total of 14 students in the municipality. The municipality had 5 primary classes and 88 students. Of the primary students, 1.1% were permanent or temporary residents of Switzerland (not citizens) and 1.1% have a different mother language than the classroom language. During the same year, there were 2 lower secondary classes with a total of 26 students. There were 3.8% who were permanent or temporary residents of Switzerland (not citizens) and 3.8% have a different mother language than the classroom language.

As of 2000, there were 10 students in Linden who came from another municipality, while 39 residents attended schools outside the municipality.

Linden is home to the Bibliothek Linden library. The library has (as of 2008) 3,225 books or other media, and loaned out 2,994 items in the same year. It was open a total of 195 days with average of 3 hours per week during that year.

== Pictures ==
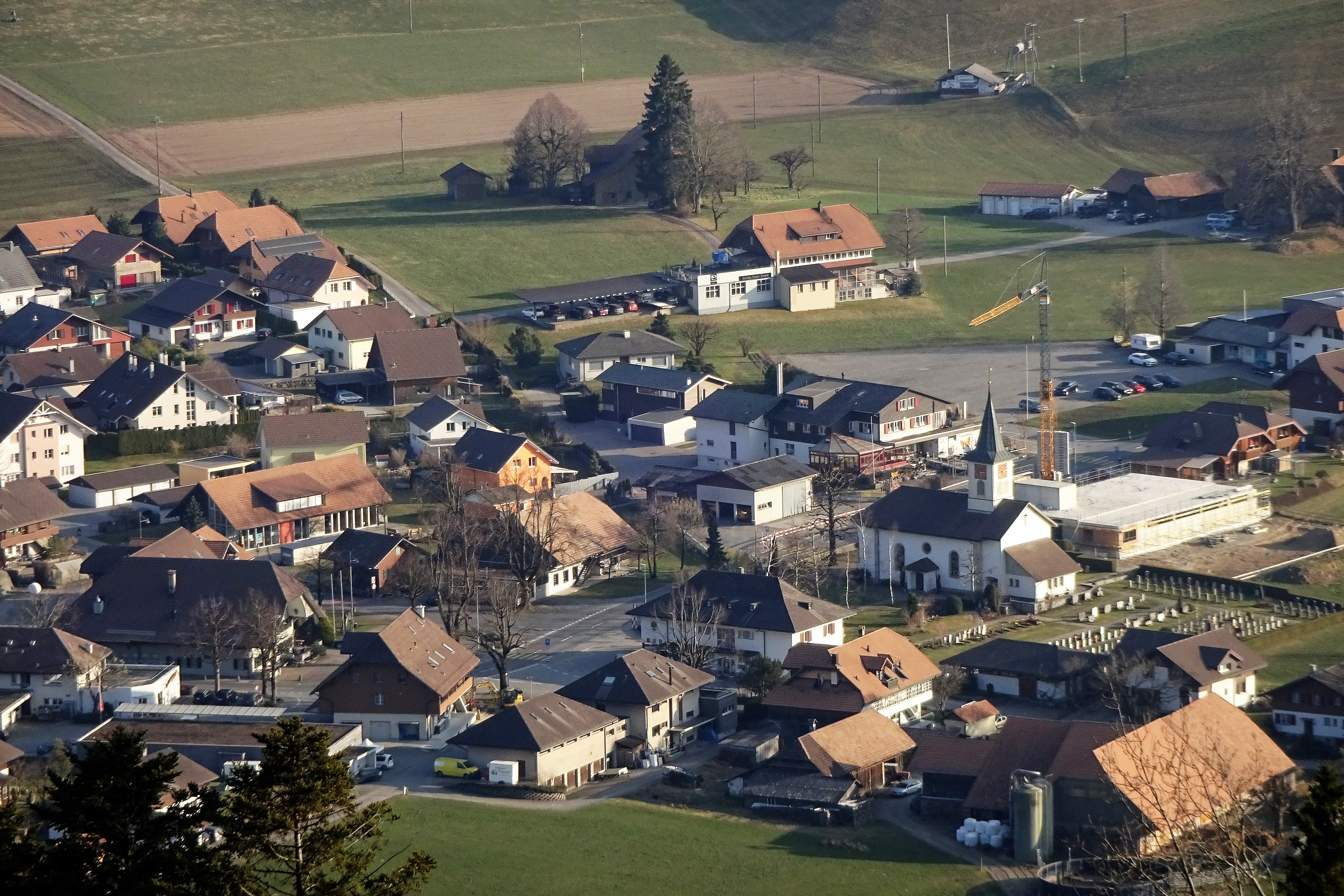
Linden (BE) – Village centre from the north (view from Aebersold)

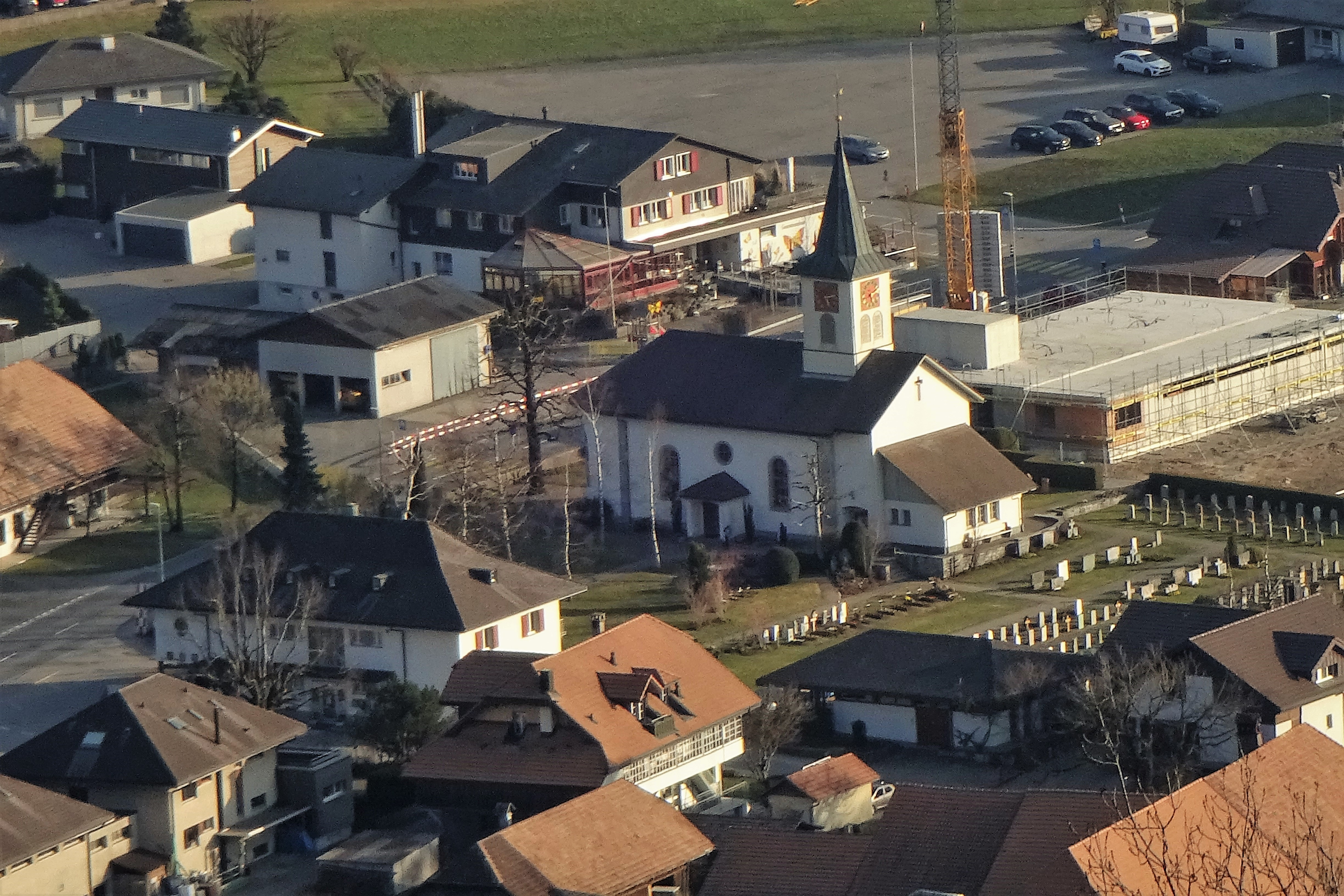
Linden (BE) – Village centre with the church from the north (view from Aebersold)

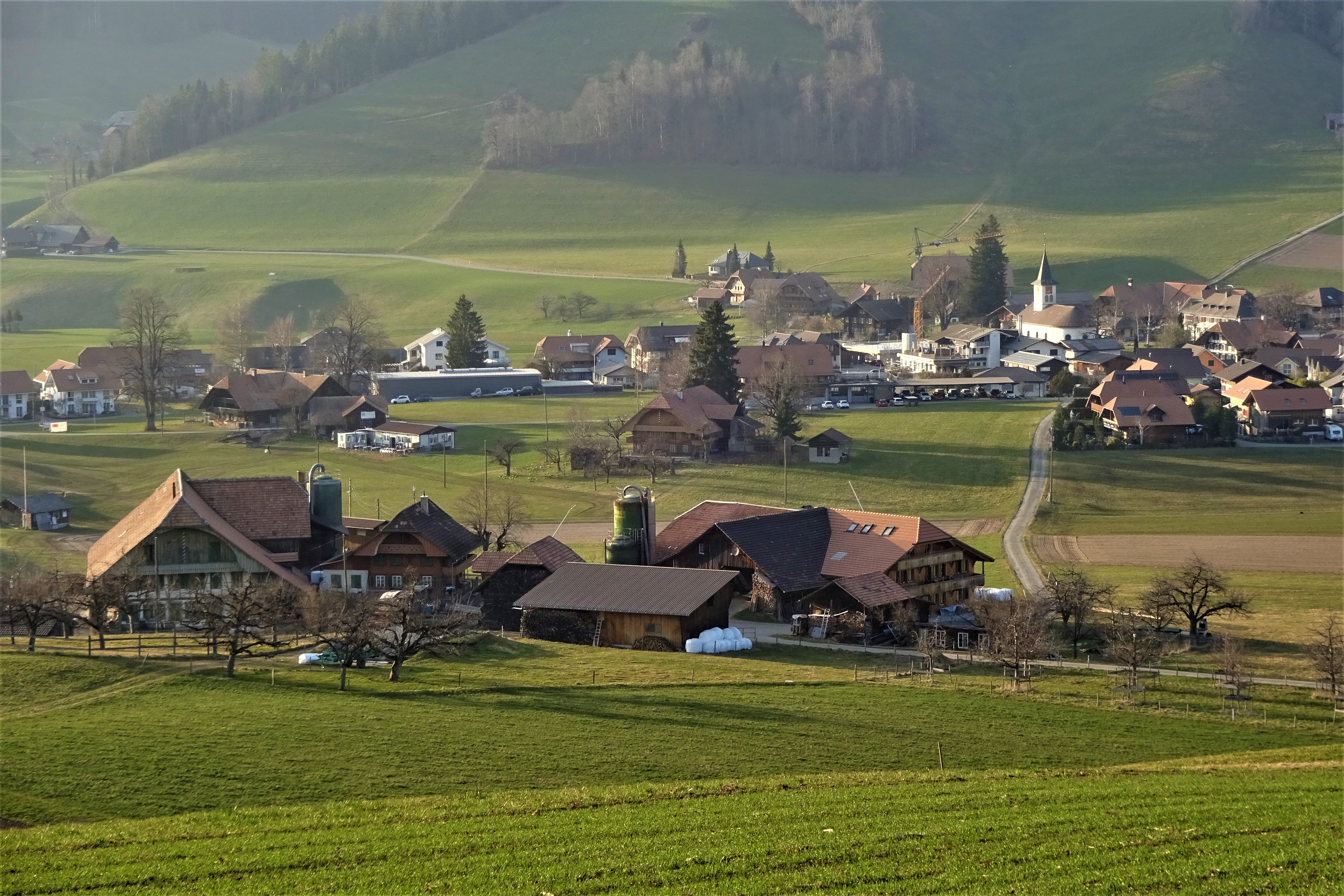
Linden (BE) – General view of the village and its surroundings from the southeast

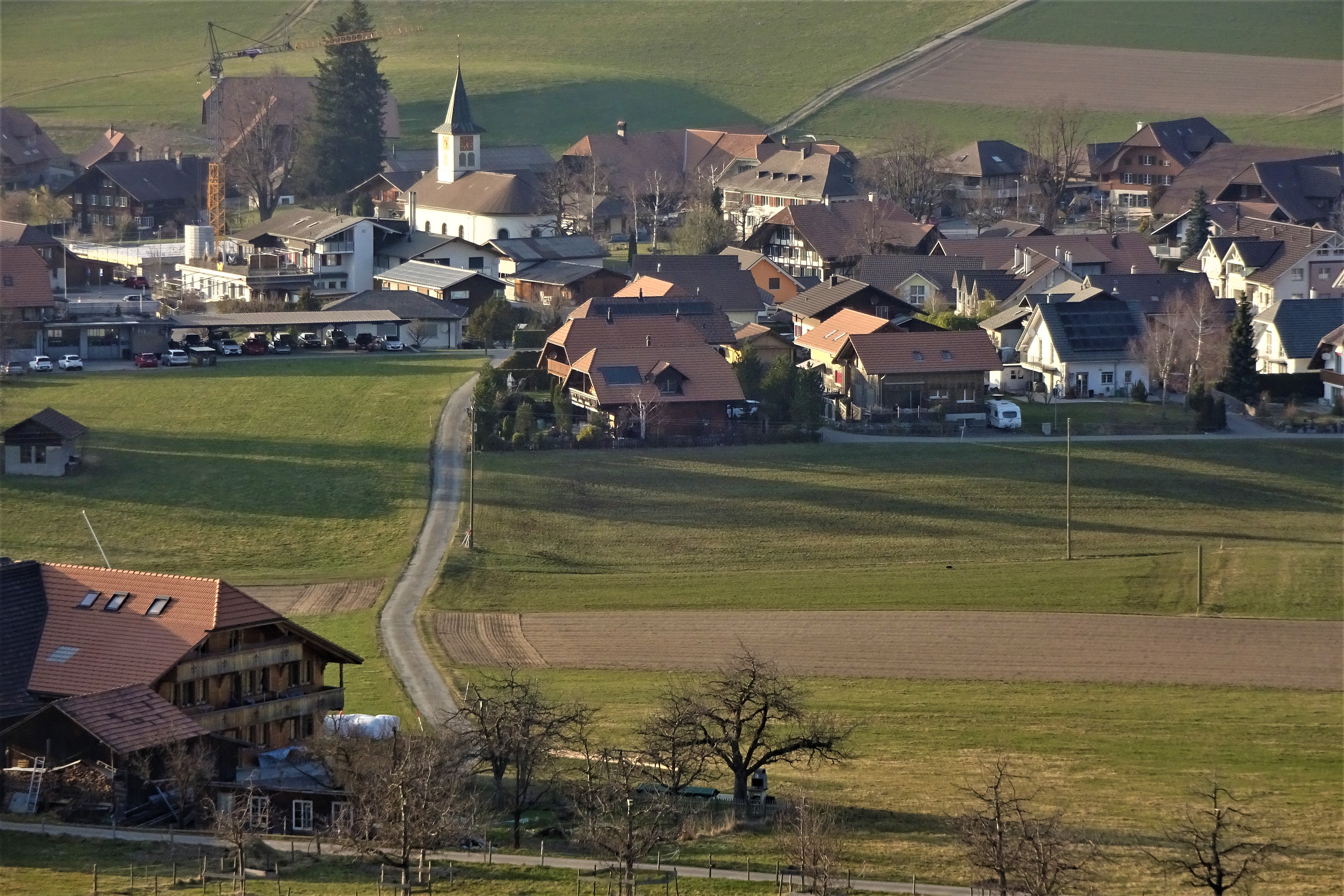
Linden (BE) – Village centre from the southeast

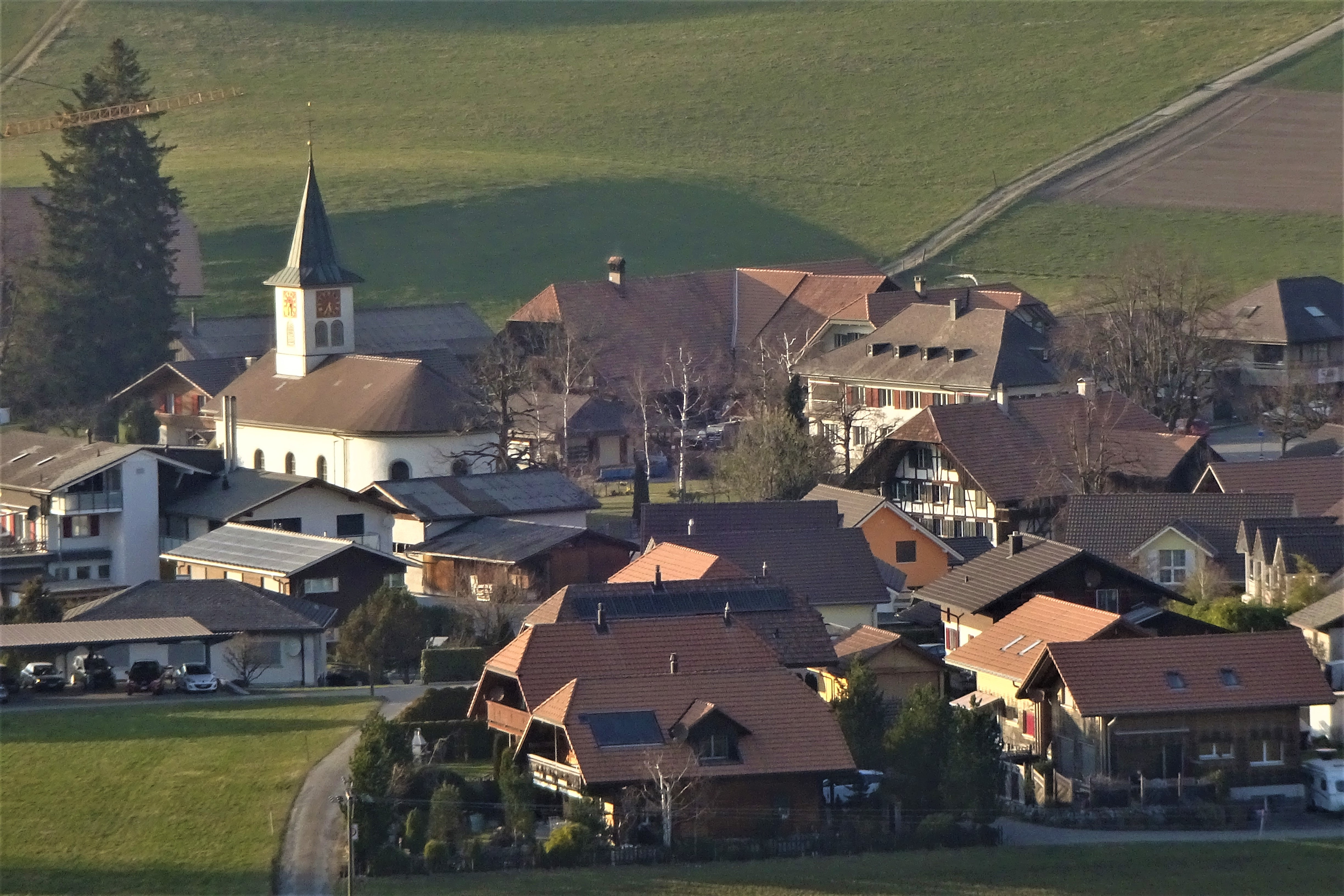
Linden (BE) – Village centre with the church from the southeast

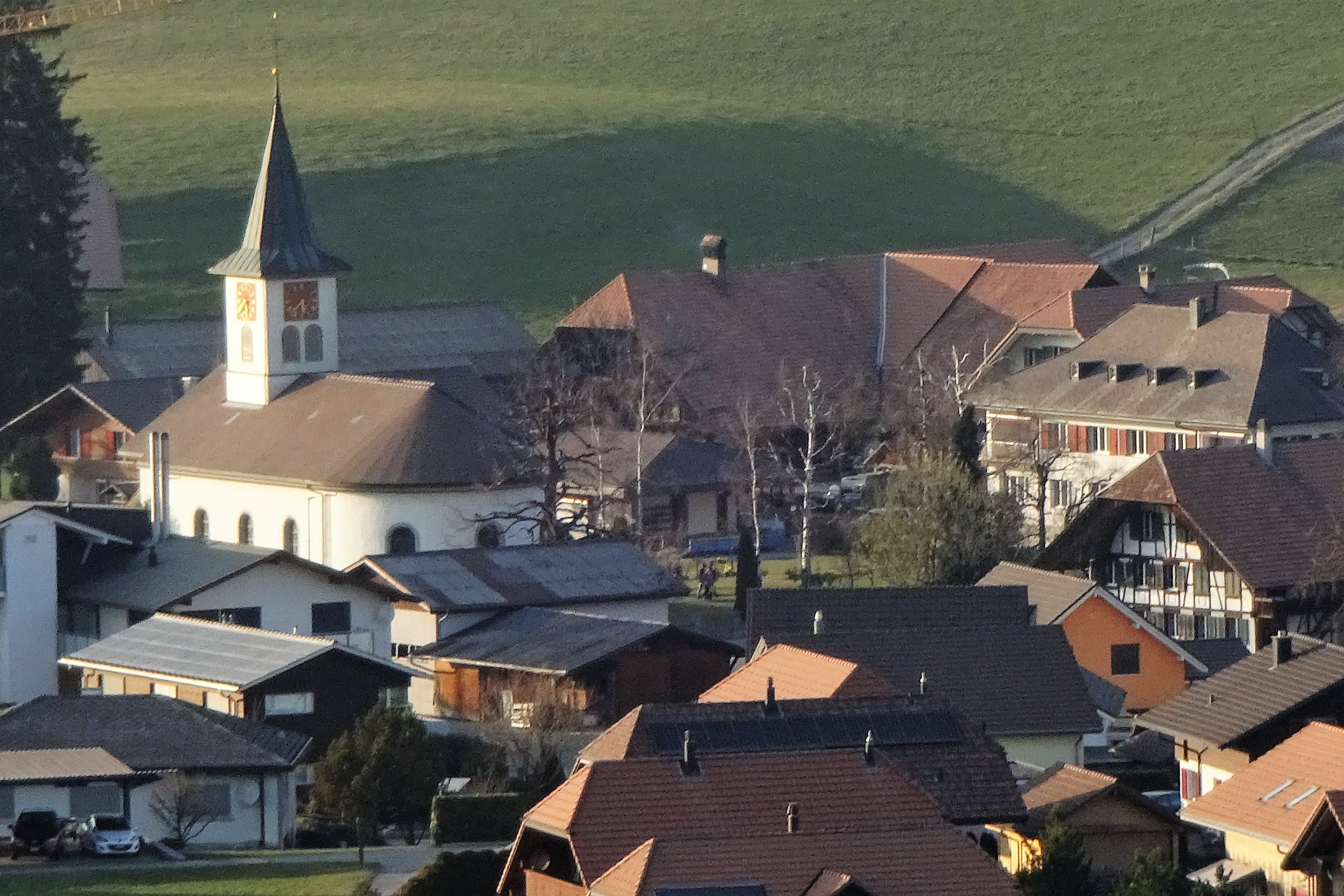
Linden (BE) – The Church from the southeast

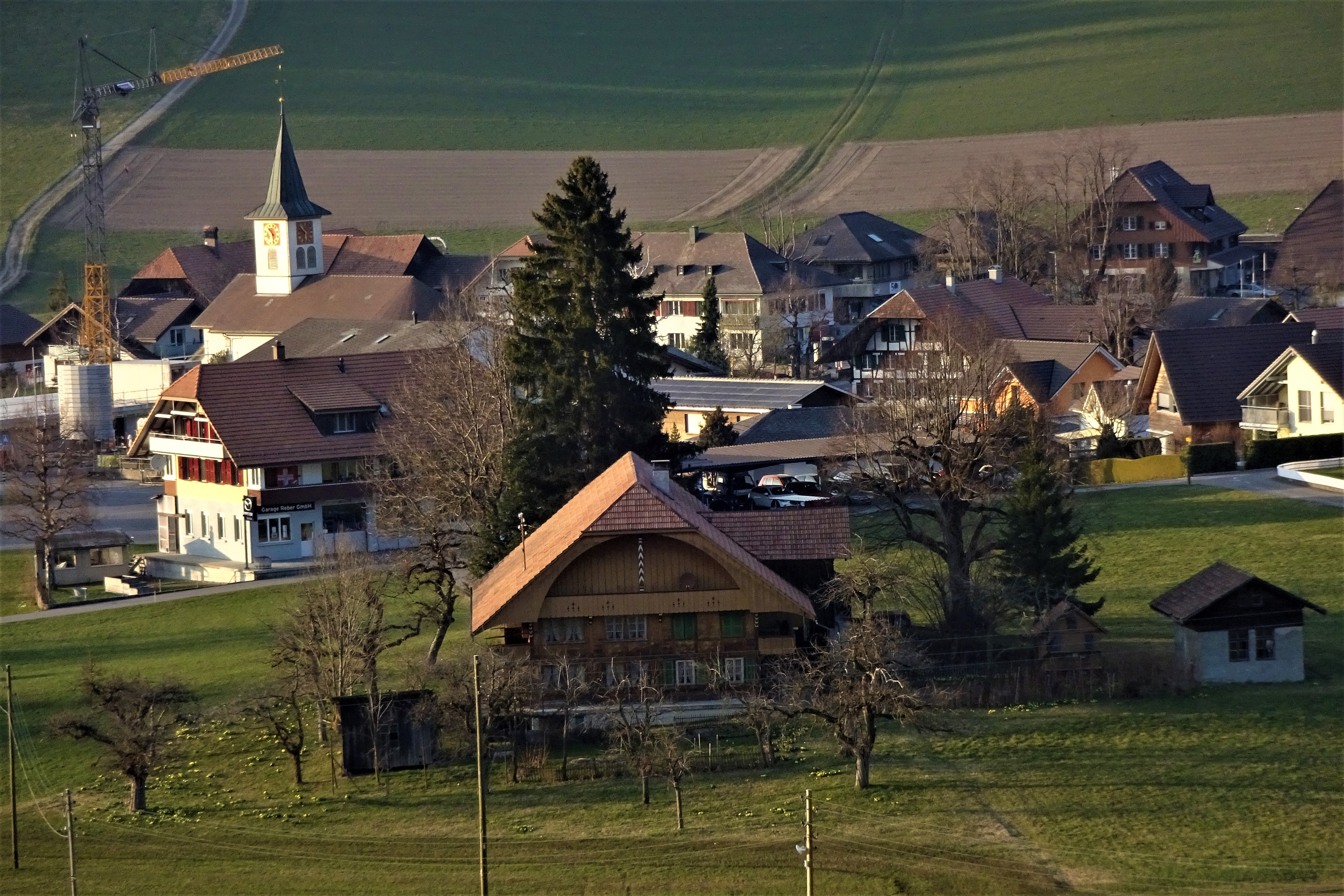
Linden (BE) – Village centre with the church from the south

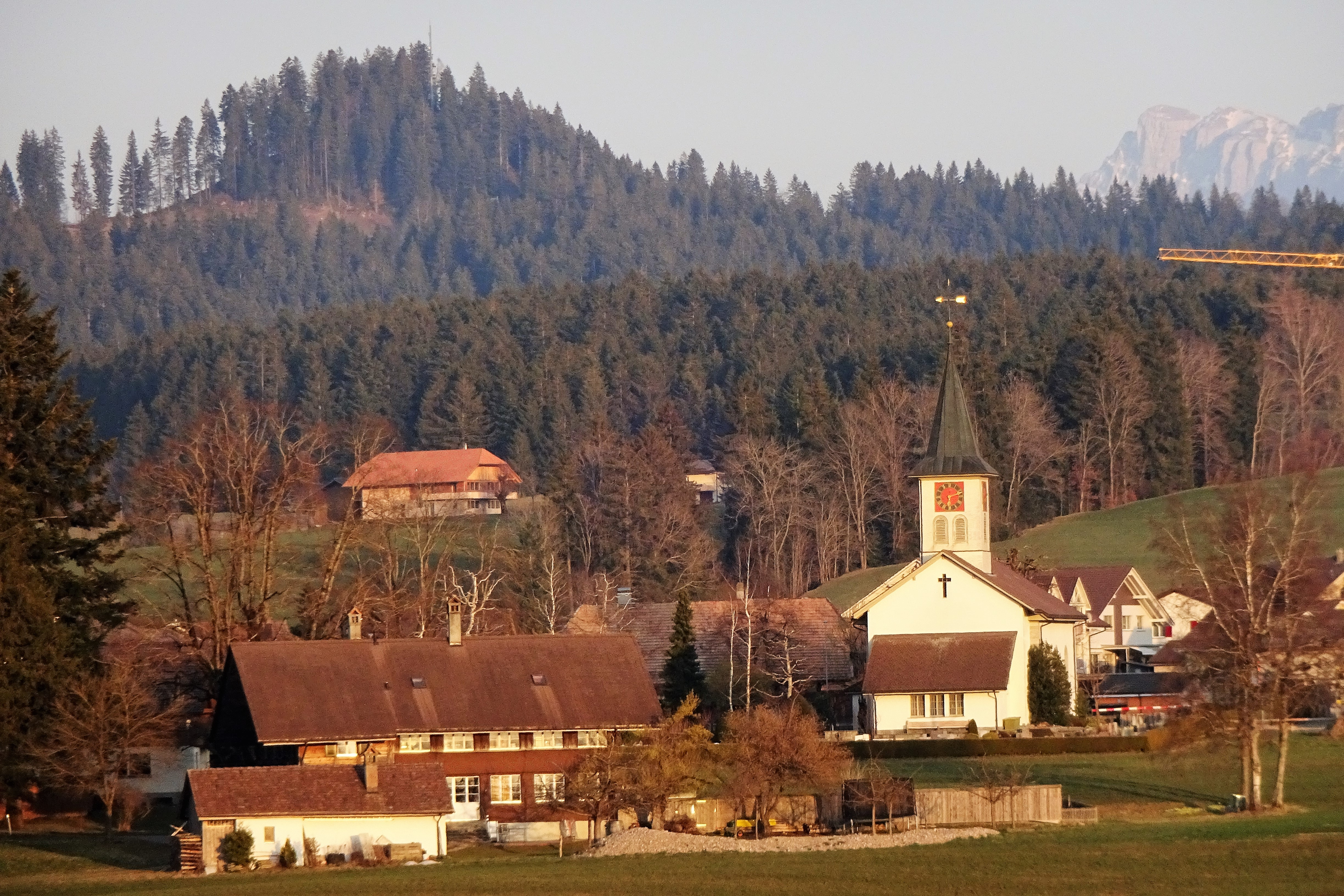
Linden (BE) – Village centre with the church, the Stauffen and Hohgant mountains from the north-northwest

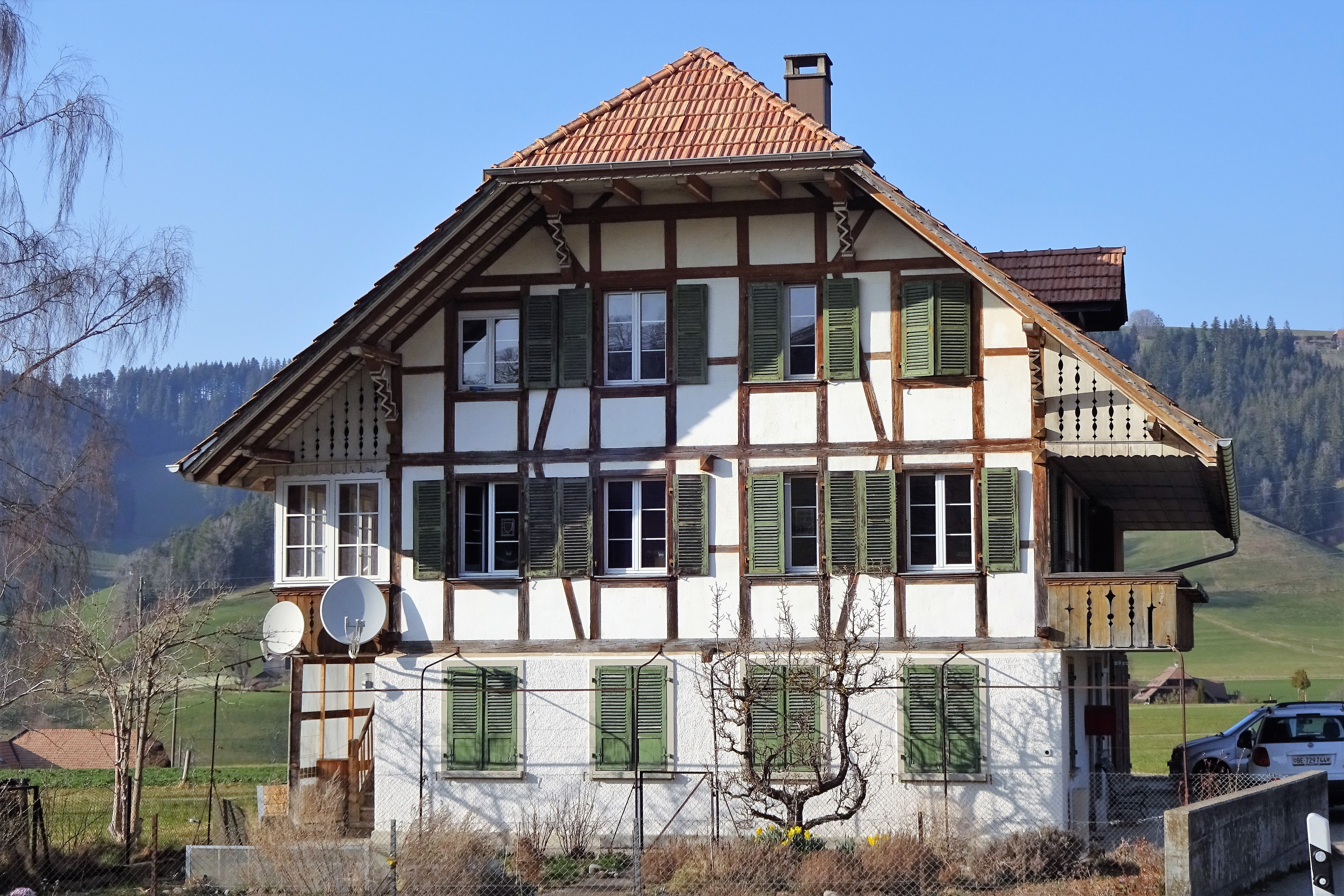
Linden (BE) – Grafenbuehl, a rural half-timbered dwelling house from the south

== Maps ==
- Landeskarte der Schweiz 1:25’000. Blatt 1187, Münsingen
- Landeskarte der Schweiz 1:25’000. Blatt 1188, Eggiwil
