= Häutligen =

- Municipality
- Flag Coat of arms
- Location of Häutligen
- Location within Switzerland Location within Canton of Bern
- Coordinates: 46°51′N 7°36′E
- Country: Switzerland
- Canton: Bern
- District: Bern-Mittelland

Government
  - Executive: Gemeinderat with 5 members
  - Mayor: Gemeindepräsident; Nicole Gäumann (as of 2026)

Area
  - Total: 3.0 km^{2} (1.2 sq mi)
- Elevation: 762 m (2,500 ft)

Population (December 2020)
  - Total: 256
  - Density: 85/km^{2} (220/sq mi)
- Time zone: UTC+01:00 (CET)
  - Summer (DST): UTC+02:00 (CEST)
- Postal code: 3510
- SFOS number: 609
- ISO 3166 code: CH-BE
- Surrounded by: Freimettigen, Konolfingen, Oberdiessbach, Tägertschi, Wichtrach
- Website: www.haeutligen.ch

Häutligen is a municipality in the Bern-Mittelland administrative district in the canton of Bern in Switzerland.

== History ==
Häutligen is first mentioned in 1240 as Hutlingen.

The oldest trace of a settlement in the area are La Tene era gold coins and a grave which were discovered in the village. During the Middle Ages, portions of the village were owned by a wide variety of local nobles and religious institutions. Around the 16th century, the city of Bern acquired the village. A village school, which was shared with Tägertschi, was built in 1833. The old school house was replaced with a new building in 1961. Until 1911 it was part of the parish of Münsingen. After that date it joined the parish of Stalden-Konolfingen.

== Geography ==
Häutligen has an area of 3.07 km^{2} (1.19 sq mi). Of this area, 2.09 km^{2} (0.81 mi^{2}) or 68.1% is used for agricultural purposes, while 0.84 km^{2} (0.32 mi^{2}) or 27.4% is forested. Of the rest of the land, 0.11 km^{2} (27 acres) or 3.6% is settled (buildings or roads).

Of the built up area, housing and buildings made up 2.0% and transportation infrastructure made up 1.6%. Out of the forested land, all of the forested land area is covered with heavy forests. Of the agricultural land, 45.9% is used for growing crops and 18.9% is pastures, while 3.3% is used for orchards or vine crops.

It is located on a plateau between the Aare River Valley and the Kiesen Valley.

On 31 December 2009 Amtsbezirk Konolfingen, the municipality's former district, was dissolved. On the following day, 1 January 2010, it joined the newly created Verwaltungskreis Bern-Mittelland.

== Coat of arms ==
The blazon of the municipal coat of arms is Impaled Argent a Rose Gules barbed and seeded proper and of the second a Butcher Axe of the first handled Or and overall a Mount of 3 Coupeaux Vert.

== Demographics ==
Häutligen has a population (as of December 2020) of 256. As of 2010, 1.7% of the population are resident foreign nationals. Over the last 10 years (2001-2011) the population has changed at a rate of 0.8%. Migration accounted for 0%, while births and deaths accounted for 0.8%.

Most of the population (as of 2000) speaks German (220 or 99.5%) as their first language with the rest speaking French

As of 2008, the population was 48.1% male and 51.9% female. The population was made up of 111 Swiss men (46.8% of the population) and 3 (1.3%) non-Swiss men. There were 122 Swiss women (51.5%) and 1 (0.4%) non-Swiss women. Of the population in the municipality, 111 or about 50.2% were born in Häutligen and lived there in 2000. There were 93 or 42.1% who were born in the same canton, while 7 or 3.2% were born somewhere else in Switzerland, and 8 or 3.6% were born outside of Switzerland.

As of 2011, children and teenagers (0–19 years old) make up 22.6% of the population, while adults (20–64 years old) make up 65.3% and seniors (over 64 years old) make up 12.1%.

As of 2000, there were 104 people who were single and never married in the municipality. There were 101 married individuals, 10 widows or widowers and 6 individuals who are divorced.

As of 2000, there were 26 households that consist of only one person and 8 households with five or more people. In 2000, a total of 82 apartments (89.1% of the total) were permanently occupied, while 4 apartments (4.3%) were seasonally occupied and 6 apartments (6.5%) were empty. The vacancy rate for the municipality, in 2011, was 0.91%.

The historical population is given in the following chart:

== Sights ==
The entire village of Häutligen is designated as part of the Inventory of Swiss Heritage Sites.

== Politics ==
In the 2011 federal election the most popular party was the Swiss People's Party (SVP) which received 55.8% of the vote. The next three most popular parties were the Conservative Democratic Party (BDP) (16.7%), the Evangelical People's Party (EVP) (6.3%) and the Christian Social Party (CSP) (6.3%). In the federal election, a total of 93 votes were cast, and the voter turnout was 47.9%.

== Economy ==
As of 2011, Häutligen had an unemployment rate of 0.65%. As of 2008, there were a total of 70 people employed in the municipality. Of these, there were 39 people employed in the primary economic sector and about 16 businesses involved in this sector. 12 people were employed in the secondary sector and there were 2 businesses in this sector. 19 people were employed in the tertiary sector, with 5 businesses in this sector. There were 115 residents of the municipality who were employed in some capacity, of which females made up 40.0% of the workforce.

In 2008 there were a total of 47 full-time equivalent jobs. The number of jobs in the primary sector was 25, all of which were in agriculture. The number of jobs in the secondary sector was 11 of which 10 or (90.9%) were in manufacturing and 1 was in construction. The number of jobs in the tertiary sector was 11. In the tertiary sector; 1 was a technical professional or scientist, 3 or 27.3% were in education and 6 or 54.5% were in health care.

In 2000, there were 14 workers who commuted into the municipality and 74 workers who commuted away. The municipality is a net exporter of workers, with about 5.3 workers leaving the municipality for every one entering. Of the working population, 4.3% used public transportation to get to work, and 59.1% used a private car.

== Religion ==
From the 2000 census, 189 or 85.5% belonged to the Swiss Reformed Church, while 6 or 2.7% were Roman Catholic. Of the rest of the population, there were 24 individuals (or about 10.86% of the population) who belonged to another Christian church. There was 1 individual who was Jewish, and 13 (or about 5.88% of the population) belonged to no church, are agnostic or atheist.

== Education ==
In Häutligen about 87 or (39.4%) of the population have completed non-mandatory upper secondary education, and 15 or (6.8%) have completed additional higher education (either university or a Fachhochschule). Of the 15 who completed tertiary schooling, 60.0% were Swiss men, 26.7% were Swiss women.

The Canton of Bern school system provides one year of non-obligatory Kindergarten, followed by six years of Primary school. This is followed by three years of obligatory lower Secondary school where the students are separated according to ability and aptitude. Following the lower Secondary students may attend additional schooling or they may enter an apprenticeship.

During the 2010-11 school year, there were a total of 21 students attending classes in Häutligen. There were no kindergarten classes in the municipality. The municipality had one primary class and 16 students. The remainder of the students attend a private or special school.

As of 2000, there were 3 students in Häutligen who came from another municipality, while 15 residents attended schools outside the municipality.
