= Freimettigen =

- Municipality
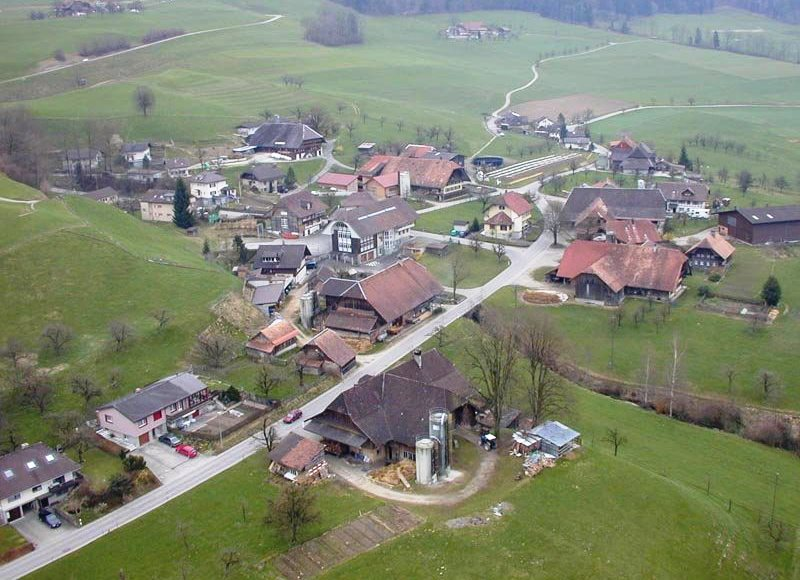

- Flag Coat of arms
- Location of Freimettigen
- Location within Switzerland Location within Canton of Bern
- Coordinates: 46°52′N 7°38′E
- Country: Switzerland
- Canton: Bern
- District: Bern-Mittelland

Government
  - Executive: Gemeinderat with 5 members
  - Mayor: Gemeindepräsident; Niklaus Moser (as of 2026)

Area
  - Total: 2.2 km^{2} (0.85 sq mi)
- Elevation: 675 m (2,215 ft)

Population (December 2020)
  - Total: 461
  - Density: 210/km^{2} (540/sq mi)
- Time zone: UTC+01:00 (CET)
  - Summer (DST): UTC+02:00 (CEST)
- Postal code: 3510
- SFOS number: 607
- ISO 3166 code: CH-BE
- Surrounded by: Häutligen, Konolfingen, Linden, Niederhünigen, Oberdiessbach
- Website: www.freimettigen.ch

Freimettigen is a municipality in the Bern-Mittelland administrative district in the canton of Bern in Switzerland.

== History ==
Freimettigen is first mentioned in 1282 as Vrimuotingen.

The oldest trace of a settlement in the area is a hoard of Bronze Age jewelry which was discovered in 1910. During the Middle Ages it was part of the Twingherrschaft of Hünigen. During the 13th and 14th centuries, Interlaken Monastery and Fraubrunnen Abbey acquired bits of land in the village. These were probably taken by the city of Bern in 1528 when it secularized the monastery.

Freimettigen has always been part of the parish of Oberdiessbach.

The village has remained generally rural with a number of dairy farmers. The Burgdorf-Thun railway station provides transportation for workers who commute to Bern or Thun for jobs.

== Geography ==
Freimettigen has an area of 2.96 km^{2} (1.14 sq mi). Of this area, 1.88 km^{2} (0.73 mi^{2}) or 63.7% is used for agricultural purposes, while 0.88 km^{2} (0.34 mi^{2}) or 29.8% is forested. Of the rest of the land, 0.17 km^{2} (0.066 mi^{2}) or 5.8% is settled (buildings or roads).

Of the built up area, housing and buildings made up 3.4% and transportation infrastructure made up 2.0%. Out of the forested land, all of the forested land area is covered with heavy forests. Of the agricultural land, 35.9% is used for growing crops and 26.4% is pastures, while 1.4% is used for orchards or vine crops.

The municipality is located on the north-west slope of the Kurzenberg, and a portion is in the Kiesen Valley. It includes the village of Freimettigen, the hamlet Dessikofen and scattered individual farm houses.

On 31 December 2009 Amtsbezirk Konolfingen, the municipality's former district, was dissolved. On the following day, 1 January 2010, it joined the newly created Verwaltungskreis Bern-Mittelland.

== Coat of arms ==
The blazon of the municipal coat of arms is Gules a Cross crosslet in Saltire Argent.

== Demographics ==
Freimettigen has a population (as of December 2020) of 461. As of 2010, 6.3% of the population are resident foreign nationals. Over the last 10 years (2001-2011) the population has changed at a rate of 0.5%. Migration accounted for 0%, while births and deaths accounted for 0.2%.

Most of the population (as of 2000) speaks German (367 or 94.1%) as their first language, Spanish is the second most common (11 or 2.8%) and English is the third (6 or 1.5%). There is 1 person who speaks French.

As of 2008, the population was 48.4% male and 51.6% female. The population was made up of 195 Swiss men (45.1% of the population) and 14 (3.2%) non-Swiss men. There were 210 Swiss women (48.6%) and 13 (3.0%) non-Swiss women. Of the population in the municipality, 122 or about 31.3% were born in Freimettigen and lived there in 2000. There were 201 or 51.5% who were born in the same canton, while 34 or 8.7% were born somewhere else in Switzerland, and 28 or 7.2% were born outside of Switzerland.

As of 2011, children and teenagers (0–19 years old) make up 25.3% of the population, while adults (20–64 years old) make up 61.8% and seniors (over 64 years old) make up 12.9%.

As of 2000, there were 181 people who were single and never married in the municipality. There were 189 married individuals, 14 widows or widowers and 6 individuals who are divorced.

As of 2000, there were 37 households that consist of only one person and 18 households with five or more people. In 2000, a total of 143 apartments (93.5% of the total) were permanently occupied, while 3 apartments (2.0%) were seasonally occupied and 7 apartments (4.6%) were empty. As of 2010, the construction rate of new housing units was 9.3 new units per 1000 residents.

The historical population is given in the following chart:

== Politics ==
In the 2011 federal election the most popular party was the Swiss People's Party (SVP) which received 30.9% of the vote. The next three most popular parties were the Conservative Democratic Party (BDP) (16.4%), the Evangelical People's Party (EVP) (13.3%) and the Christian Social Party (CSP) (13.3%). In the federal election, a total of 166 votes were cast, and the voter turnout was 50.6%.

== Economy ==
As of 2011, Freimettigen had an unemployment rate of 0.75%. As of 2008, there were a total of 57 people employed in the municipality. Of these, there were 36 people employed in the primary economic sector and about 13 businesses involved in this sector. No one was employed in the secondary sector. 21 people were employed in the tertiary sector, with 6 businesses in this sector. There were 209 residents of the municipality who were employed in some capacity, of which females made up 38.8% of the workforce.

In 2008 there were a total of 37 full-time equivalent jobs. The number of jobs in the primary sector was 22, all of which were in agriculture. There were no jobs in the secondary sector. The number of jobs in the tertiary sector was 15. In the tertiary sector; 1 was in wholesale or retail sales or the repair of motor vehicles, 4 or 26.7% were in a hotel or restaurant, 1 was a technical professional or scientist, 3 or 20.0% were in education.

In 2000, there were 8 workers who commuted into the municipality and 157 workers who commuted away. The municipality is a net exporter of workers, with about 19.6 workers leaving the municipality for every one entering. Of the working population, 15.8% used public transportation to get to work, and 48.8% used a private car.

== Religion ==
From the 2000 census, 306 or 78.5% belonged to the Swiss Reformed Church, while 24 or 6.2% were Roman Catholic. Of the rest of the population, there were 72 individuals (or about 18.46% of the population) who belonged to another Christian church. There were 4 (or about 1.03% of the population) who were Islamic. 14 (or about 3.59% of the population) belonged to no church, are agnostic or atheist, and 6 individuals (or about 1.54% of the population) did not answer the question.

== Education ==
In Freimettigen about 160 or (41.0%) of the population have completed non-mandatory upper secondary education, and 65 or (16.7%) have completed additional higher education (either university or a Fachhochschule). Of the 65 who completed tertiary schooling, 64.6% were Swiss men, 24.6% were Swiss women.

The Canton of Bern school system provides one year of non-obligatory Kindergarten, followed by six years of Primary school. This is followed by three years of obligatory lower Secondary school where the students are separated according to ability and aptitude. Following the lower Secondary students may attend additional schooling or they may enter an apprenticeship.

During the 2010-11 school year, there were a total of 47 students attending classes in Freimettigen. There was one kindergarten class with a total of 12 students in the municipality. Of the kindergarten students, 8.3% were permanent or temporary residents of Switzerland (not citizens) and 8.3% have a different mother language than the classroom language. The municipality had one primary class and 25 students. During the same year, there was one lower secondary class with a total of 10 students. There was one student who was a permanent or temporary resident of Switzerland (not the citizen) and had a different mother language than the classroom language.

As of 2000, there were 66 students from Freimettigen who attended schools outside the municipality.
