= Mirchel =

- Municipality
- Flag Coat of arms
- Location of Mirchel
- Location within Switzerland Location within Canton of Bern
- Coordinates: 46°54′N 7°39′E
- Country: Switzerland
- Canton: Bern
- District: Bern-Mittelland

Government
  - Executive: Gemeinderat with 5 members
  - Mayor: Gemeindepräsident(in); Andreas Wüthrich (as of 2026)

Area
  - Total: 2.4 km^{2} (0.93 sq mi)
- Elevation: 669 m (2,195 ft)

Population (December 2020)
  - Total: 616
  - Density: 260/km^{2} (660/sq mi)
- Time zone: UTC+01:00 (CET)
  - Summer (DST): UTC+02:00 (CEST)
- Postal code: 3532
- SFOS number: 615
- ISO 3166 code: CH-BE
- Surrounded by: Grosshöchstetten, Konolfingen, Niederhünigen, Oberhünigen, Zäziwil
- Website: mirchel.ch

Mirchel is a municipality in the Bern-Mittelland administrative district in the canton of Bern in Switzerland.

== History ==
Mirchel is first mentioned in 1320 as Mirchlon.

The oldest traces of a settlement in the area are a La Tene grave and iron tools. During the Middle Ages Mirchel was part of the Herrschaft of Signau. In 1529 the Herrschaft came under Bernese control and Mirchel became part of the Bernese bailiwick of Signau. It has always been part of the parish of Möschberg. Beginning in the 1970s many commuters settled in the municipality and today about two-thirds of the working population commutes to jobs nearby cities and towns.

== Geography ==
Mirchel has an area of 2.34 km^{2} (0.90 sq mi). Of this area, 1.8 km^{2} (0.69 mi^{2}) or 76.6% is used for agricultural purposes, while 0.25 km^{2} (0.097 mi^{2}) or 10.6% is forested. Of the rest of the land, 0.31 km^{2} (0.12 mi^{2}) or 13.2% is settled (buildings or roads).

Of the built up area, housing and buildings made up 5.5% and transportation infrastructure made up 6.0%. Power and water infrastructure as well as other special developed areas made up 1.3% of the area Out of the forested land, all of the forested land area is covered with heavy forests. Of the agricultural land, 51.9% is used for growing crops and 19.6% is pastures, while 5.1% is used for orchards or vine crops.

It is located in the upper Kiesental (Kiesen Valley) and includes the village of Mirchel, the hamlet of Gmeis and scattered farm house clusters and isolated farm houses.

On 31 December 2009 Amtsbezirk Konolfingen, the municipality's former district, was dissolved. On the following day, 1 January 2010, it joined the newly created Verwaltungskreis Bern-Mittelland.

== Coat of arms ==
The blazon of the municipal coat of arms is Per pale Or and Vert an Oak Branch palewise counterchanged.

== Demographics ==
Mirchel has a population (as of December 2020) of 616. As of 2010, 1.2% of the population are resident foreign nationals. Over the last 10 years (2001-2011) the population has changed at a rate of 4.2%. Migration accounted for 2.6%, while births and deaths accounted for 1.1%.

Most of the population (as of 2000) speaks German (487 or 99.2%) as their first language, English is the second most common (2 or 0.4%) and French is the third (1 or 0.2%).

As of 2008, the population was 51.3% male and 48.7% female. The population was made up of 288 Swiss men (50.4% of the population) and 5 (0.9%) non-Swiss men. There were 276 Swiss women (48.3%) and 2 (0.4%) non-Swiss women. Of the population in the municipality, 185 or about 37.7% were born in Mirchel and lived there in 2000. There were 235 or 47.9% who were born in the same canton, while 41 or 8.4% were born somewhere else in Switzerland, and 19 or 3.9% were born outside of Switzerland.

As of 2011, children and teenagers (0–19 years old) make up 25.9% of the population, while adults (20–64 years old) make up 58.3% and seniors (over 64 years old) make up 15.8%.

As of 2000, there were 199 people who were single and never married in the municipality. There were 258 married individuals, 23 widows or widowers and 11 individuals who are divorced.

As of 2000, there were 45 households that consist of only one person and 14 households with five or more people. In 2000, a total of 184 apartments (85.2% of the total) were permanently occupied, while 24 apartments (11.1%) were seasonally occupied and 8 apartments (3.7%) were empty. As of 2010, the construction rate of new housing units was 14 new units per 1000 residents.

The historical population is given in the following chart:

== Politics ==
In the 2011 federal election the most popular party was the Swiss People's Party (SVP) which received 45.3% of the vote. The next three most popular parties were the Conservative Democratic Party (BDP) (21.1%), the Federal Democratic Union of Switzerland (EDU) (6.8%) and the Evangelical People's Party (EVP) (5.7%). In the federal election, a total of 207 votes were cast, and the voter turnout was 45.8%.

== Economy ==
As of 2011, Mirchel had an unemployment rate of 0.66%. As of 2008, there were a total of 131 people employed in the municipality. Of these, there were 54 people employed in the primary economic sector and about 23 businesses involved in this sector. 3 people were employed in the secondary sector and there was 1 business in this sector. 74 people were employed in the tertiary sector, with 13 businesses in this sector. There were 296 residents of the municipality who were employed in some capacity, of which females made up 41.6% of the workforce.

In 2008 there were a total of 84 full-time equivalent jobs. The number of jobs in the primary sector was 31, all of which were in agriculture. There were 2 manufacturing jobs. The number of jobs in the tertiary sector was 51. In the tertiary sector; 8 or 15.7% were in wholesale or retail sales or the repair of motor vehicles, 31 or 60.8% were in a hotel or restaurant, 2 or 3.9% were the insurance or financial industry, 2 or 3.9% were technical professionals or scientists, 5 or 9.8% were in education.

In 2000, there were 41 workers who commuted into the municipality and 217 workers who commuted away. The municipality is a net exporter of workers, with about 5.3 workers leaving the municipality for every one entering. Of the working population, 13.2% used public transportation to get to work, and 56.4% used a private car.

== Religion ==
From the 2000 census, 432 or 88.0% belonged to the Swiss Reformed Church, while 19 or 3.9% were Roman Catholic. Of the rest of the population, there were 38 individuals (or about 7.74% of the population) who belonged to another Christian church. 15 (or about 3.05% of the population) belonged to no church, are agnostic or atheist, and 6 individuals (or about 1.22% of the population) did not answer the question.

== Education ==
In Mirchel about 225 or (45.8%) of the population have completed non-mandatory upper secondary education, and 37 or (7.5%) have completed additional higher education (either university or a Fachhochschule). Of the 37 who completed tertiary schooling, 75.7% were Swiss men, 18.9% were Swiss women.

The Canton of Bern school system provides one year of non-obligatory Kindergarten, followed by six years of Primary school. This is followed by three years of obligatory lower Secondary school where the students are separated according to ability and aptitude. Following the lower Secondary students may attend additional schooling or they may enter an apprenticeship.

During the 2010–11 school year, there were a total of 63 students attending classes in Mirchel. There was one kindergarten class with a total of 11 students in the municipality. The municipality had 2 primary classes and 42 students. During the same year, there was one lower secondary class with a total of 10 students.

As of 2000, there were 2 students in Mirchel who came from another municipality, while 21 residents attended schools outside the municipality.

== Notable residents ==
- Friedrich Traugott Wahlen (10 April 1899 – 7 November 1985) born in Gmeis hamlet. Swiss agricultural professor and member of the Federal Council.
