= Tägertschi =

- Former municipality
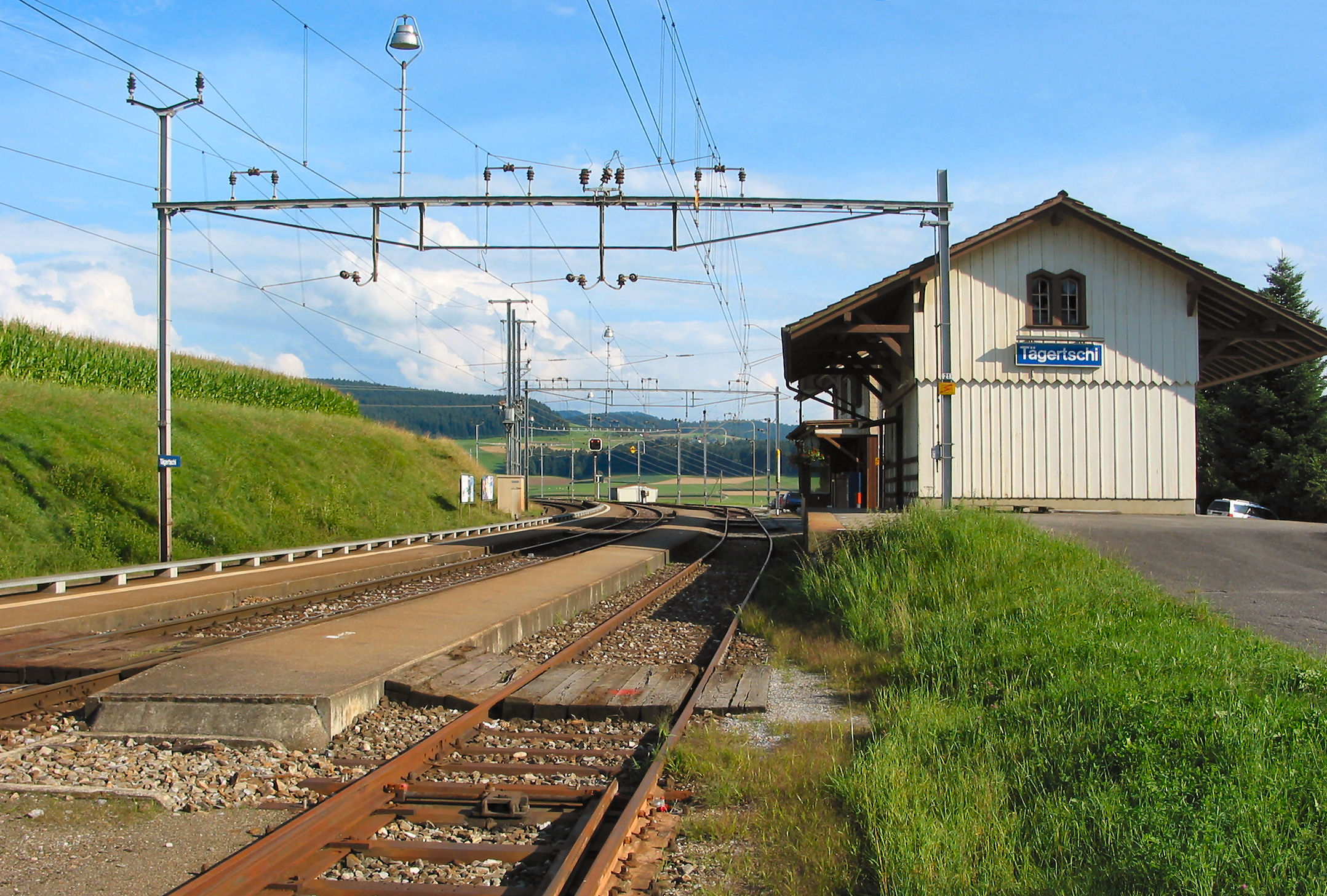

- Flag Coat of arms
- Location of Tägertschi
- Location within Switzerland Location within Canton of Bern
- Coordinates: 46°52′N 7°35′E
- Country: Switzerland
- Canton: Bern
- District: Bern-Mittelland

Area
  - Total: 3.6 km^{2} (1.4 sq mi)
- Elevation: 604 m (1,982 ft)

Population (Dec 2011)
  - Total: 414
  - Density: 120/km^{2} (300/sq mi)
- Time zone: UTC+01:00 (CET)
  - Summer (DST): UTC+02:00 (CEST)
- Postal code: 3111
- SFOS number: 625
- ISO 3166 code: CH-BE
- Surrounded by: Häutligen, Konolfingen, Münsingen, Wichtrach
- Website: SFSO statistics

Tägertschi is a former municipality in the Bern-Mittelland administrative district in the canton of Bern in Switzerland. On 1 January 2017 the former municipality of Tägertschi merged into the municipality of Münsingen.

== History ==
Tägertschi is first mentioned in 1273 as Tegersche.

For most of their history, the village of Tägertschi along with the settlements of Stalden and Ämligen were part of the parish and municipality of Münsingen. Eventually Ämligen and Stalden im Emmental (now part of Konolfingen) formed an independent political municipality. However, in 1923, Ämligen (which at that time had about 35 residents) voted to separate themselves from Stalden and form a new municipality with Tägertschi.

A railway station on the Bern-Langnau was completed near Tägertschi in 1864. Today it is located on the municipal border between Tägertschi and Konolfingen. Many of the workers in the municipality commute to jobs in nearby cities, though there are several small factories in the municipality.

== Geography ==
Tägertschi has an area of 3.64 km^{2} (1.41 sq mi). As of 2012, a total of 2.84 km^{2} (1.10 mi^{2}) or 78.0% is used for agricultural purposes, while 0.57 km^{2} (0.22 mi^{2}) or 15.7% is forested. Of the rest of the land, 0.19 km^{2} (0.073 mi^{2}) or 5.2% is settled (buildings or roads).

During the same year, housing and buildings made up 2.7% and transportation infrastructure made up 2.2%. Out of the forested land, all of the forested land area is covered with heavy forests. Of the agricultural land, 61.3% is used for growing crops and 12.6% is pastures, while 4.1% is used for orchards or vine crops.

The municipality is located between the Aare and Emme river valleys. It consists of the village of Tägertschi, the neighborhoods of Station and Ämligen as well as scattered farm houses.

On 31 December 2009 Amtsbezirk Konolfingen, the municipality's former district, was dissolved. On the following day, 1 January 2010, it joined the newly created Verwaltungskreis Bern-Mittelland.

== Coat of arms ==
The blazon of the municipal coat of arms is Gules a Chief and a Pale Argent between a Vine Grape slipped Or in dexter and Corn Ear of the last in sinister.

== Demographics ==
Tägertschi has a population (as of December 2020) of 386. As of 2010, 2.9% of the population are resident foreign nationals. Over the last 10 years (2001-2011) the population has changed at a rate of 0%. Migration accounted for -1%, while births and deaths accounted for 1.2%.

Most of the population (as of 2000) speaks German (331 or 98.5%) as their first language, English is the second most common (2 or 0.6%) and Albanian is the third (2 or 0.6%).

As of 2008, the population was 51.0% male and 49.0% female. The population was made up of 203 Swiss men (49.0% of the population) and 8 (1.9%) non-Swiss men. There were 199 Swiss women (48.1%) and 4 (1.0%) non-Swiss women. Of the population in the municipality, 102 or about 30.4% were born in Tägertschi and lived there in 2000. There were 183 or 54.5% who were born in the same canton, while 33 or 9.8% were born somewhere else in Switzerland, and 13 or 3.9% were born outside of Switzerland.

As of 2011, children and teenagers (0–19 years old) make up 25.4% of the population, while adults (20–64 years old) make up 63% and seniors (over 64 years old) make up 11.6%.

As of 2000, there were 165 people who were single and never married in the municipality. There were 149 married individuals, 13 widows or widowers and 9 individuals who are divorced.

As of 2010, there were 31 households that consist of only one person and 17 households with five or more people. In 2000, a total of 119 apartments (93.0% of the total) were permanently occupied, while 4 apartments (3.1%) were seasonally occupied and 5 apartments (3.9%) were empty. As of 2010, the construction rate of new housing units was 2.4 new units per 1000 residents. The vacancy rate for the municipality, in 2011, was 1.19%.

The historical population is given in the following chart:

== Politics ==
In the 2011 federal election the most popular party was the Swiss People's Party (SVP) which received 37.3% of the vote. The next three most popular parties were the Conservative Democratic Party (BDP) (15.6%), the Social Democratic Party (SP) (10%) and the Green Party (8.3%). In the federal election, a total of 190 votes were cast, and the voter turnout was 60.3%.

== Economy ==
As of 2011, Tägertschi had an unemployment rate of 0.9%. As of 2008, there were a total of 126 people employed in the municipality. Of these, there were 54 people employed in the primary economic sector and about 19 businesses involved in this sector. 48 people were employed in the secondary sector and there were 6 businesses in this sector. 24 people were employed in the tertiary sector, with 7 businesses in this sector. There were 202 residents of the municipality who were employed in some capacity, of which females made up 40.6% of the workforce.

In 2008 there were a total of 98 full-time equivalent jobs. The number of jobs in the primary sector was 40, all of which were in agriculture. The number of jobs in the secondary sector was 41 of which 26 or (63.4%) were in manufacturing and 16 (39.0%) were in construction. The number of jobs in the tertiary sector was 17. In the tertiary sector; 6 or 35.3% were in a hotel or restaurant, 2 or 11.8% were technical professionals or scientists, 4 or 23.5% were in education and 4 or 23.5% were in health care.

In 2000, there were 59 workers who commuted into the municipality and 132 workers who commuted away. The municipality is a net exporter of workers, with about 2.2 workers leaving the municipality for every one entering. Of the working population, 18.3% used public transportation to get to work, and 46% used a private car.

== Religion ==
From the 2000 census, 281 or 83.6% belonged to the Swiss Reformed Church, while 24 or 7.1% were Roman Catholic. Of the rest of the population, there were 20 individuals (or about 5.95% of the population) who belonged to another Christian church. There were 4 (or about 1.19% of the population) who were Islamic. 15 (or about 4.46% of the population) belonged to no church, are agnostic or atheist, and 1 individuals (or about 0.30% of the population) did not answer the question.

== Education ==
In Tägertschi about 142 or (42.3%) of the population have completed non-mandatory upper secondary education, and 51 or (15.2%) have completed additional higher education (either university or a Fachhochschule). Of the 51 who completed tertiary schooling, 76.5% were Swiss men, 21.6% were Swiss women.

The Canton of Bern school system provides one year of non-obligatory Kindergarten, followed by six years of Primary school. This is followed by three years of obligatory lower Secondary school where the students are separated according to ability and aptitude. Following the lower Secondary students may attend additional schooling or they may enter an apprenticeship.

During the 2011-12 school year, there were a total of 36 students attending classes in Tägertschi. There was one kindergarten class with a total of 12 students in the municipality. The municipality had one primary class and 19 students. Of the primary students, 5.3% were permanent or temporary residents of Switzerland (not citizens) and 10.5% have a different mother language than the classroom language. During the same year, there was one lower secondary class with a total of 5 students.

As of 2000, there were a total of 42 students attending any school in the municipality, of which 40 both lived and attended school in the municipality. During the same year, there were 2 students in Tägertschi who came from another municipality, while 17 residents attended schools outside the municipality.

== Notable people ==
- Alisha Lehmann (born 1999), footballer for the Switzerland national team and Juventus
