= Bern-Mittelland (administrative district) =

Coordinates: 46°57′N 7°29′E

Bern-Mittelland District Verwaltungskreis Bern-Mittelland
- District
- Country: Switzerland
- Canton: Bern
- Capital: Ostermundigen

Area
  - Total: 946.3 km^{2} (365.4 sq mi)

Population (2020)
  - Total: 418,191
  - Density: 441.9/km^{2} (1,145/sq mi)
- Time zone: UTC+1 (CET)
  - Summer (DST): UTC+2 (CEST)
- Municipalities: 74

Bern-Mittelland District in the canton of Bern was created on 1 January 2010. It is part of the Bern-Mittelland administrative region, and is the only district in the region. It contains 74 municipalities with an area of 946.30 km^{2} (365.37 sq mi) and a population (as of 2020) of 418,191.

It is made up of the valley of the rivers Aare and Emme, some of the foothills of the Bernese Alps, as well as the plain around the capital Bern, and has many small farms and hilly forested regions with small to mid-sized towns scattered throughout.

== Municipalities ==
COA	Name	Population (31 December 2020)	Area in km^{2}
Allmendingen	Allmendingen	579	3.80
Arni	Arni	936	10.44
Bäriswil	Bäriswil	1,071	2.72
Belp	Belp	11,603	23.26
Bern	Bern	134,794	51.61
Biglen	Biglen	1,847	3.61
Bolligen	Bolligen	6,308	16.56
Bowil	Bowil	1,354	14.69
Bremgarten bei Bern	Bremgarten bei Bern	4,340	1.91
Brenzikofen	Brenzikofen	481	2.20
Deisswil bei Münchenbuchsee	Deisswil bei Münchenbuchsee	86	2.14
Ferenbalm	Ferenbalm	1,214	9.18
Fraubrunnen	Fraubrunnen	5,203	31.91
Frauenkappelen	Frauenkappelen	1,320	9.31
Freimettigen	Freimettigen	461	2.95
Gerzensee	Gerzensee	1,237	7.79
Grosshöchstetten	Grosshöchstetten	4,143	3.47
Guggisberg	Guggisberg	1,490	54.92
Gurbrü	Gurbrü	254	1.84
Häutligen	Häutligen	256	3.0
Herbligen	Herbligen	593	2.77
Iffwil	Iffwil	428	5.07
Ittigen	Ittigen	11,430	4.21
Jaberg	Jaberg	306	1.32
Jegenstorf	Jegenstorf	5,738	13.49
Kaufdorf	Kaufdorf	1,073	2.04
Kehrsatz	Kehrsatz	4,380	4.44
Kiesen	Kiesen	1,012	4.69
Kirchdorf	Kirchdorf	1,796	6.10
Kirchlindach	Kirchlindach	3,200	11.97
Köniz	Köniz	42,388	50.98
Konolfingen	Konolfingen	5,451	12.79
Kriechenwil	Kriechenwil	441	4.76
Landiswil	Landiswil	619	10.26
Laupen	Laupen	3,230	4.11
Linden	Linden	1,304	13.23
Mattstetten	Mattstetten	580	3.82
Meikirch	Meikirch	2,526	10.22
Mirchel	Mirchel	616	2.35
Moosseedorf	Moosseedorf	4,092	6.34
Mühleberg	Mühleberg	2,997	26.21
Münchenbuchsee	Münchenbuchsee	10,233	8.82
Münchenwiler	Münchenwiler	518	2.50
Münsingen	Münsingen	12,966	15.77
Muri bei Bern	Muri bei Bern	13,182	7.64
Neuenegg	Neuenegg	5,601	21.87
Niederhünigen	Niederhünigen	657	5.40
Niedermuhlern	Niedermuhlern	512	7.24
Oberbalm	Oberbalm	866	12.42
Oberdiessbach	Oberdiessbach	3,552	16.47
Oberhünigen	Oberhünigen	316	6.03
Oberthal	Oberthal	721	10.51
Oppligen	Oppligen	638	3.40
Ostermundigen	Ostermundigen	17,758	5.96
Riggisberg	Riggisberg	2,599	34.5
Rubigen	Rubigen	2,892	6.93
Rüeggisberg	Rüeggisberg	1,765	35.79
Rüschegg	Rüschegg	1,697	57.27
Schwarzenburg	Schwarzenburg	6,812	44.88
Stettlen	Stettlen	3,162	3.52
Thurnen	Thurnen	2,035	6.0
Toffen	Toffen	2,547	4.91
Urtenen-Schönbühl	Urtenen-Schönbühl	6,367	7.18
Vechigen	Vechigen	5,512	24.82
Wald	Wald	1,160	13.30
Walkringen	Walkringen	1,755	17.19
Wichtrach	Wichtrach	4,377	11.57
Wiggiswil	Wiggiswil	103	1.44
Wileroltigen	Wileroltigen	361	4.16
Wohlen bei Bern	Wohlen bei Bern	9,240	36.33
Worb	Worb	11,621	21.10
Zäziwil	Zäziwil	1,601	5.42
Zollikofen	Zollikofen	10,640	5.38
Zuzwil	Zuzwil	563	3.46
	Total (74)	418,191	946.30

== Mergers and name changes ==
- On 1 January 2011 the former municipalities of Albligen and Wahlern merged to form the new municipality of Schwarzenburg.
- The municipality of Belpberg merged on 1 January 2012 into the municipality of Belp.
- On 1 January 2014 the former municipality of Bleiken bei Oberdiessbach merged into the municipality of Oberdiessbach. The former municipalities of Büren zum Hof, Etzelkofen, Grafenried, Limpach, Mülchi, Schalunen and Zauggenried merged into the municipality of Fraubrunnen, the former municipality of Münchringen and Scheunen merged into the municipality of Jegenstorf.
- The municipality of Tägertschi merged on 1 January 2017 into the municipality of Münsingen.
- On 1 January 2018 the former municipalities of Gelterfingen, Mühledorf and Noflen merged into the municipality of Kirchdorf.
- The municipality of Schlosswil merged on 1 January 2018 into the municipality of Grosshöchstetten.
- On 1 January 2019 the former municipality of Golaten merged into the municipality of Kallnach.
- On 1 January 2020 the former municipalities of Kirchenthurnen, Lohnstorf and Mühlethurnen merged into the new municipality of Thurnen.
- On 1 January 2021 the former municipality of Rümligen merged into Riggisberg.
- On 1 January 2022 the former municipality of Clavaleyres merged into Murten (Canton of Freiburg)
- On 1 January 2023 the former municipality of Diemerswil merged into Münchenbuchsee.

== Demographics ==
Bern-Mittelland has a population (as of December 2020) of 418,191. As of 2008, the population was 48.3% male and 51.7% female. The population was made up of 156,642 Swiss men (40.3% of the population) and 31,135 (8.0%) non-Swiss men. There were 172,829 Swiss women (44.5%) and 2,794 (0.7%) non-Swiss women.
