= Konolfingen =

- Municipality
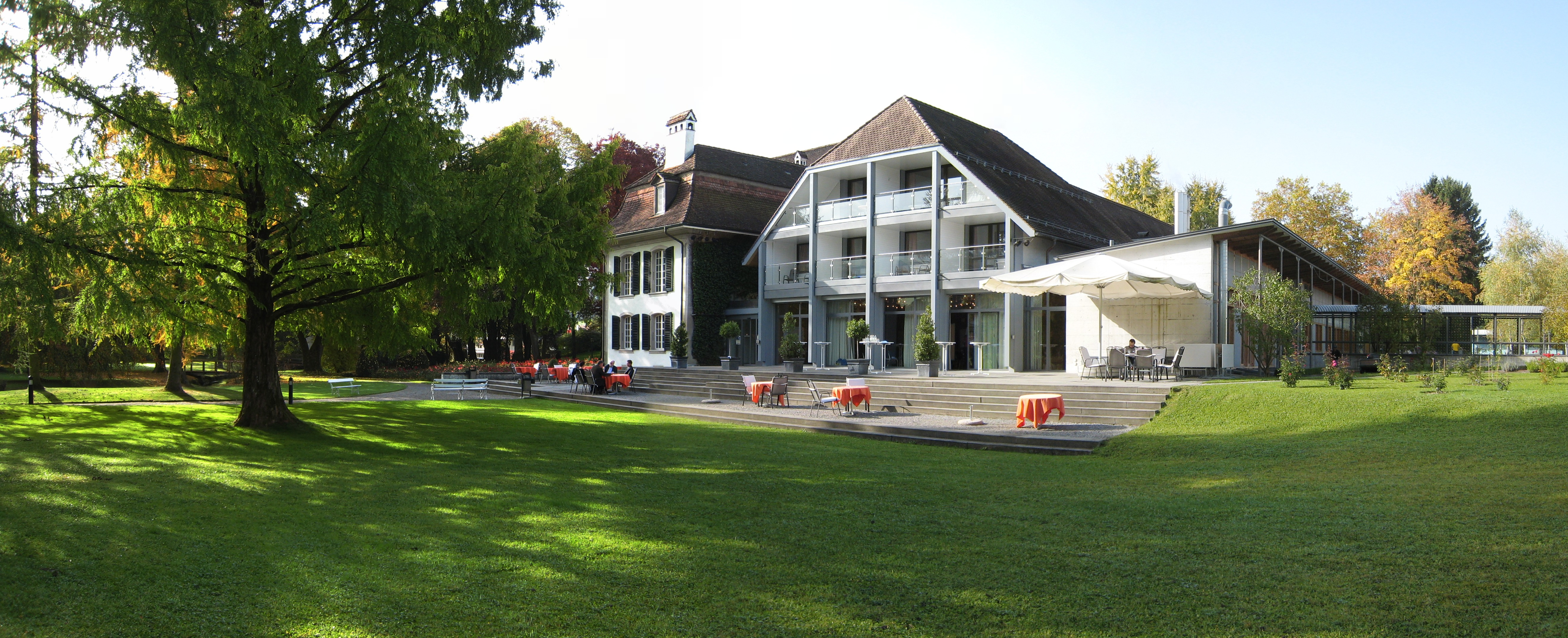

- Flag Coat of arms
- Location of Konolfingen
- Location within Switzerland Location within Canton of Bern
- Coordinates: 46°53′N 7°37′E
- Country: Switzerland
- Canton: Bern
- District: Bern-Mittelland

Government
  - Executive: Gemeinderat with 7 members
  - Mayor: Gemeindepräsident; Jonas Rohrer SVP/UDC (as of 2026)

Area
  - Total: 12.8 km^{2} (4.9 sq mi)
- Elevation: 658 m (2,159 ft)

Population (December 2020)
  - Total: 5,451
  - Density: 426/km^{2} (1,100/sq mi)
- Time zone: UTC+01:00 (CET)
  - Summer (DST): UTC+02:00 (CEST)
- Postal code: 3510
- SFOS number: 612
- ISO 3166 code: CH-BE
- Surrounded by: Freimettigen, Grosshöchstetten, Häutligen, Mirchel, Münsingen, Niederhünigen, Schlosswil, Tägertschi, Trimstein
- Website: www.konolfingen.ch

Konolfingen is a municipality in the Bern-Mittelland administrative district in the canton of Bern in Switzerland.

== History ==
Aerial view (1950)

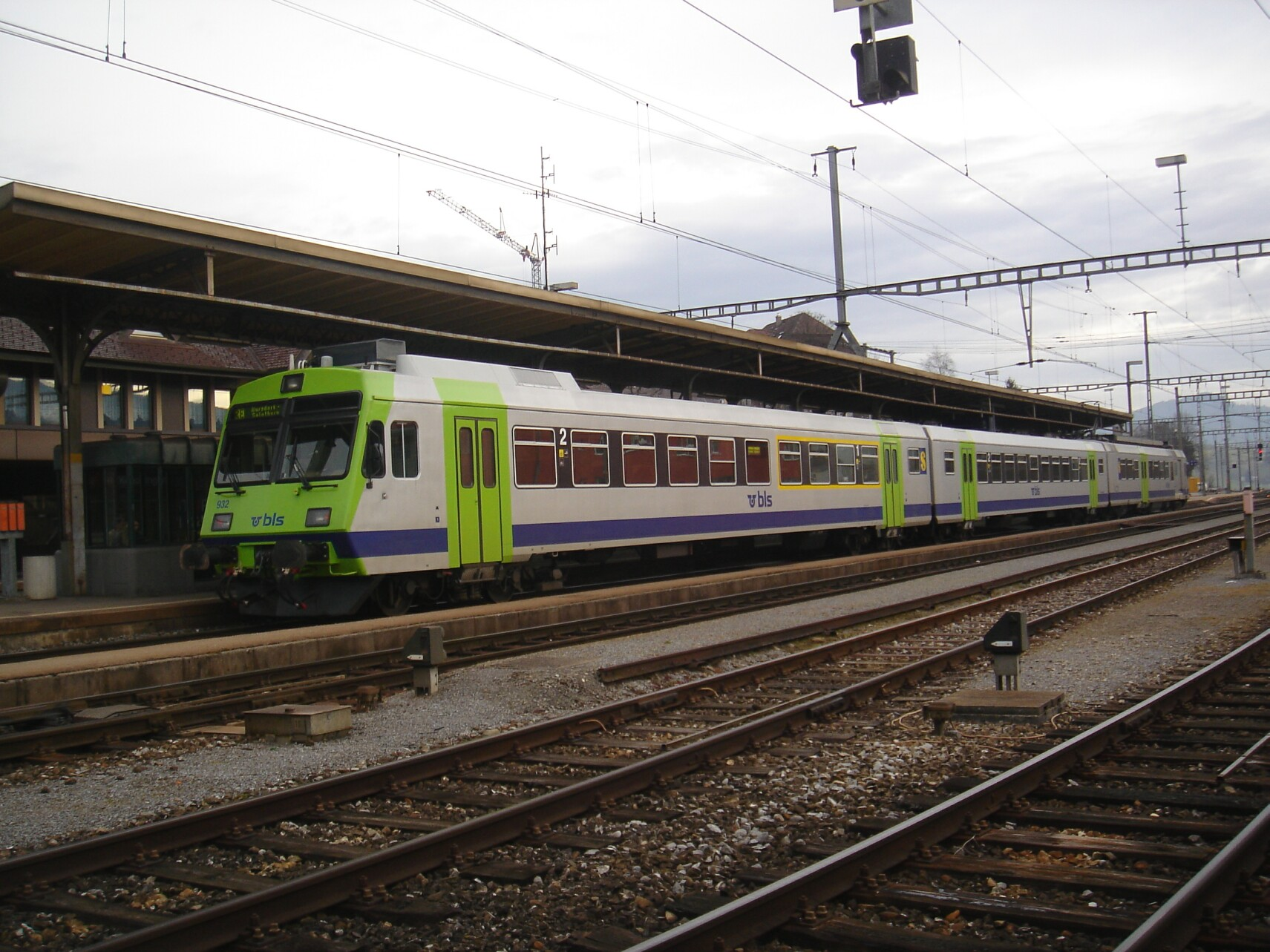
Konolfingen railway station today

Konolfingen village is first mentioned in 1148 as Chonolfingen. It is a relatively new municipality, having been formed from the union of Gysenstein and Stalden in 1933.

While the current municipality is relatively new, Konolfingen village was an important local administrative center. Under the Counts of Kyburg and later the city of Bern, Konolfingen was the center of a district, the home of the high court and the execution grounds. Originally the town was owned by the Lords of Krauchtal, but in either 1397 or 1424, they donated Konolfingen to Thorberg Abbey. In 1528, Bern adopted the Protestant Reformation and secularized all the Abbey's lands. It became part of the bailiwick of Thorberg and was combined with Walkringen to form a single court. However, the village remained an administrative center until the creation of the Helvetic Republic in 1798. In 1814, due to the lack of suitable buildings in Konolfingen, Schlosswil became the administrative center and court for the district of Konolfingen.

Throughout most of its history it was part of the parish of Münsingen. A filial church was built in Konolfingen in 1898 and in 1911, the villages broke away to form the parish of Stalden. The Stalden name only remained for a year, in 1912 it was renamed Konolfingen parish. A Catholic church was built in the municipality in 1967.

Much of the land around the village was too swampy to farm until a drainage project in 1845–55 and the Kiesen river correction project of 1911–15 opened up the land. Following the first drainage project, traffic began to move through the area near Konolfingen. Between 1851 and 1856 the village of Stalden grew in an important stopping place on the Aare valley-Emmental and Burgdorf-Thun roads. In 1864, the Bern-Langnau railroad built a station in the land between Konolfingen and Stalden. This was followed in 1899 by a connection to the Burgdorf-Thun railroad. The convenient transportation links encouraged the Berneralpen dairy to build a factory between the two villages. The first factory brought several other businesses to the villages and led to growth. In 1933 the communities of Gysenstein (which included Konolfingen village) and Stalden merged to form the municipality of Konolfingen. The new municipality continued to grow and in 1949, a secondary school opened.

== Geography ==
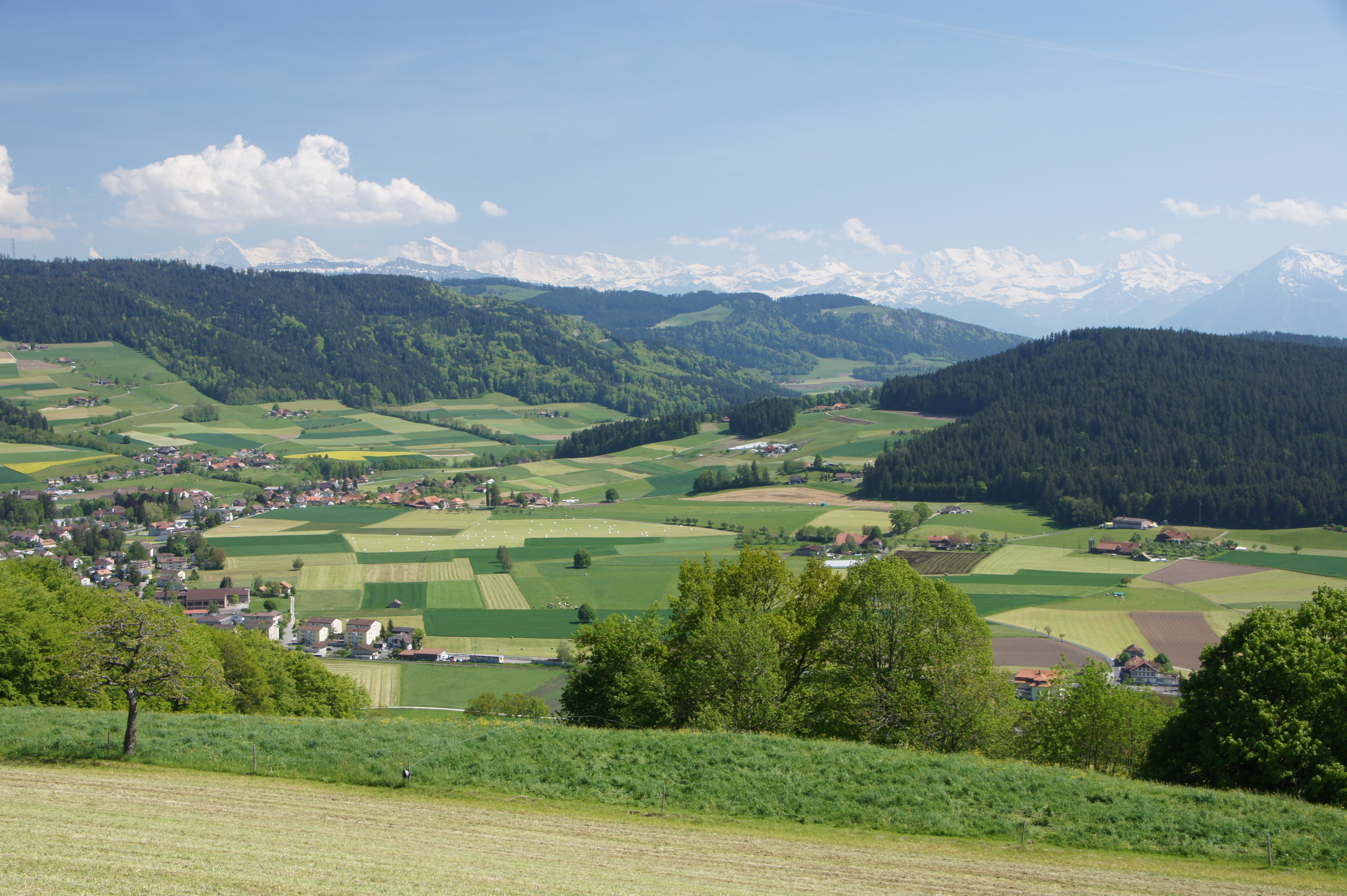
Farm land around Ballenbüel, a village in the municipality

Konolfingen has an area of 12.77 km^{2} (4.93 sq mi). Of this area, 8.48 km^{2} (3.27 mi^{2}) or 66.3% is used for agricultural purposes, while 2.44 km^{2} (0.94 mi^{2}) or 19.1% is forested. Of the rest of the land, 1.85 km^{2} (0.71 mi^{2}) or 14.5% is settled (buildings or roads), 0.01 km^{2} (2.5 acres) or 0.1% is either rivers or lakes.

Of the built up area, housing and buildings made up 8.4% and transportation infrastructure made up 3.8%. Out of the forested land, all of the forested land area is covered with heavy forests. Of the agricultural land, 39.4% is used for growing crops and 24.6% is pastures, while 2.3% is used for orchards or vine crops. All the water in the municipality is flowing water.

Lying at an altitude of over 650 meters (2,130 ft), Konolfingen is often referred to as the "gateway to the Emmental."

It was created in 1933 through the merger of the former municipalities of Gysenstein and Stalden im Emmental. The municipality includes the new village center which connects the older villages of Konolfingen-Dorf and Stalden. It also includes the farming hamlets of Gysenstein, Herolfingen, Hürnberg, Ursellen, Ballenbüel and Hötschigen as well as scattered individual farm houses.

On 31 December 2009 Amtsbezirk Konolfingen, of which it was the capital, was dissolved. On the following day, 1 January 2010, it joined the newly created Verwaltungskreis Bern-Mittelland.

== Coat of arms ==
The blazon of the municipal coat of arms is Or a Semi Lion Rampant double-tailed Gules issuant from three bricked Wall Sable and in chief two Mullets of the second.

== Demographics ==
Konolfingen has a population (as of December 2020) of 5,451. As of 2010, 8.0% of the population are resident foreign nationals. Over the last 10 years (2001–2011) the population has changed at a rate of 0.6%. Migration accounted for -0.5%, while births and deaths accounted for 0%.

Most of the population (as of 2000) speaks German (4,281 or 92.9%) as their first language, Italian is the second most common (62 or 1.3%) and Albanian is the third (44 or 1.0%). There are 22 people who speak French and 1 person who speaks Romansh.

As of 2008, the population was 47.6% male and 52.4% female. The population was made up of 2,061 Swiss men (43.3% of the population) and 206 (4.3%) non-Swiss men. There were 2,323 Swiss women (48.8%) and 173 (3.6%) non-Swiss women. Of the population in the municipality, 1,446 or about 31.4% were born in Konolfingen and lived there in 2000. There were 2,113 or 45.9% who were born in the same canton, while 492 or 10.7% were born somewhere else in Switzerland, and 408 or 8.9% were born outside of Switzerland.

As of 2011, children and teenagers (0–19 years old) make up 19.7% of the population, while adults (20–64 years old) make up 60.3% and seniors (over 64 years old) make up 20.1%.

As of 2000, there were 1,916 people who were single and never married in the municipality. There were 2,230 married individuals, 302 widows or widowers and 158 individuals who are divorced.

As of 2000, there were 587 households that consist of only one person and 138 households with five or more people. In 2000, a total of 1,854 apartments (92.5% of the total) were permanently occupied, while 86 apartments (4.3%) were seasonally occupied and 65 apartments (3.2%) were empty. As of 2010, the construction rate of new housing units was 0.4 new units per 1000 residents. The vacancy rate for the municipality, in 2011, was 0.71%.

The historical population is given in the following chart:

== Politics ==
In the 2011 federal election the most popular party was the Swiss People's Party (SVP) which received 32% of the vote. The next three most popular parties were the Conservative Democratic Party (BDP) (17%), the Social Democratic Party (SP) (16.2%) and the FDP.The Liberals (7.1%). In the federal election, a total of 1,961 votes were cast, and the voter turnout was 53.4%.

== Economy ==
As of 2011, Konolfingen had an unemployment rate of 1.33%. As of 2008, there were a total of 2,510 people employed in the municipality. Of these, there were 212 people employed in the primary economic sector and about 71 businesses involved in this sector. 881 people were employed in the secondary sector and there were 48 businesses in this sector. 1,417 people were employed in the tertiary sector, with 142 businesses in this sector. There were 2,422 residents of the municipality who were employed in some capacity, of which females made up 43.8% of the workforce.

In 2008 there were a total of 2,061 full-time equivalent jobs. The number of jobs in the primary sector was 128, all of which were in agriculture. The number of jobs in the secondary sector was 827 of which 565 or (68.3%) were in manufacturing and 262 (31.7%) were in construction. The number of jobs in the tertiary sector was 1,106. In the tertiary sector; 275 or 24.9% were in wholesale or retail sales or the repair of motor vehicles, 42 or 3.8% were in the movement and storage of goods, 108 or 9.8% were in a hotel or restaurant, 67 or 6.1% were the insurance or financial industry, 351 or 31.7% were technical professionals or scientists, 52 or 4.7% were in education and 130 or 11.8% were in health care.

In 2000, there were 1,398 workers who commuted into the municipality and 1,456 workers who commuted away. The municipality is a net exporter of workers, with about 1.0 workers leaving the municipality for every one entering. Of the working population, 24.3% used public transportation to get to work, and 43.5% used a private car.

== Religion ==
From the 2000 census, 3,440 or 74.7% belonged to the Swiss Reformed Church, while 458 or 9.9% were Roman Catholic. Of the rest of the population, there were 29 members of an Orthodox church (or about 0.63% of the population), there were 2 individuals (or about 0.04% of the population) who belonged to the Christian Catholic Church, and there were 393 individuals (or about 8.53% of the population) who belonged to another Christian church. There was 1 individual who was Jewish, and 139 (or about 3.02% of the population) who were Islamic. There was 1 person who was Buddhist, 36 individuals who were Hindu and 2 individuals who belonged to another church. 157 (or about 3.41% of the population) belonged to no church, are agnostic or atheist, and 143 individuals (or about 3.10% of the population) did not answer the question.

== Education ==
In Konolfingen about 1,901 or (41.3%) of the population have completed non-mandatory upper secondary education, and 519 or (11.3%) have completed additional higher education (either university or a Fachhochschule). Of the 519 who completed tertiary schooling, 72.1% were Swiss men, 19.3% were Swiss women, 4.8% were non-Swiss men and 3.9% were non-Swiss women.

The Canton of Bern school system provides one year of non-obligatory Kindergarten, followed by six years of Primary school. This is followed by three years of obligatory lower Secondary school where the students are separated according to ability and aptitude. Following the lower Secondary students may attend additional schooling or they may enter an apprenticeship.

During the 2010–11 school year, there were a total of 534 students attending classes in Konolfingen. There were 3 kindergarten classes with a total of 74 students in the municipality. Of the kindergarten students, 14.9% were permanent or temporary residents of Switzerland (not citizens) and 4.1% have a different mother language than the classroom language. The municipality had 17 primary classes and 275 students. Of the primary students, 13.5% were permanent or temporary residents of Switzerland (not citizens) and 1.1% have a different mother language than the classroom language. During the same year, there were 10 lower secondary classes with a total of 185 students. There were 9.2% who were permanent or temporary residents of Switzerland (not citizens) and 1.1% have a different mother language than the classroom language.

As of 2000, there were 139 students in Konolfingen who came from another municipality, while 112 residents attended schools outside the municipality.

Konolfingen is home to the Bibliothek Konolfingen library. The library has (as of 2008) 12,908 books or other media, and loaned out 43,477 items in the same year. It was open a total of 320 days with average of 13 hours per week during that year.

== Transportation ==
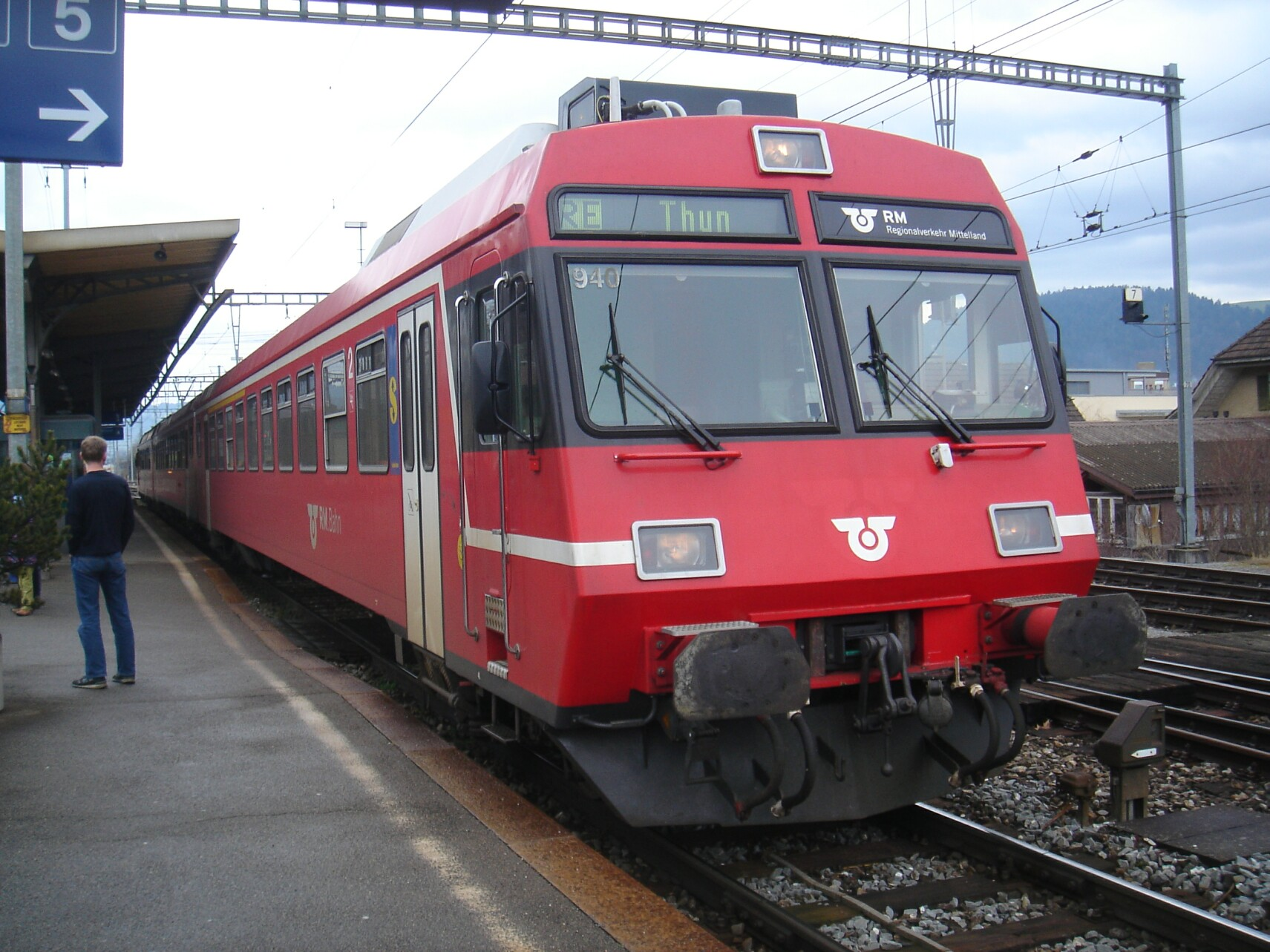
Thun-bound train at the Konolfingen railway station in 2007

The municipality has two railway stations, Konolfingen and Stalden i.E.. The former is located at the junction of the Bern–Lucerne and Burgdorf–Thun lines, while Stalden im Emmental is just to the south of Konolfingen on the Burgdorf–Thun line.
