= Niederwichtrach =

Former municipality in Bern, Switzerland

- Former municipality
- Niederwichtrach from 700 m, aerial photograph by Walter Mittelholzer, 1922
- Location of Niederwichtrach
- Location within Switzerland Location within Canton of Bern
- Coordinates: 46.8498°N 7.576°E
- Country: Switzerland
- Canton: Bern
- District: Konolfingen
- Municipality: Wichtrach

Population (2000)
  - Total: 1,322
- Time zone: UTC+01:00 (CET)
  - Summer (DST): UTC+02:00 (CEST)
- ISO 3166 code: CH-BE
- Website

Niederwichtrach is a former municipality in the Konolfingen District and the Bern-Mittelland administrative district of the canton of Bern, Switzerland. In 2004 it merged with Oberwichtrach to form the new municipality of Wichtrach. The village lies on the right side of the Aare valley.

== History ==
Niederwichtrach is first mentioned in 1180 as Wichtracho. It had 361 inhabitants in 1764, 706 in 1850, 720 in 1900, 769 in 1950 and 1,322 in 2000. Graves from the late La Tène period have been discovered in the area of the Seinfeld gravel pit and in the Bachtelen, and Roman wall remains under the Rolli house.

In the late Middle Ages and the early modern period, Niederwichtrach belonged to the lordship of Münsingen for low justice, until the holders of that lordship, the von Steiger, citizens of Bern, divided the property in the 17th century. Niederwichtrach then became a lordship of its own (Twingherrschaft), whose seat was the country house built in 1570 behind Münsingen Castle. The seigneurial rights were lost in 1798. Niederwichtrach belonged to the parish, and later the parish community, of Wichtrach, whose parish church is in Oberwichtrach.

From the 16th century, the open-field village (Zelgdorf) of Niederwichtrach, together with Oberwichtrach, was obliged to maintain defenses against the Aare (regulation on dike building of 1596) to protect the common land (Allmend) from flooding. After the correction of the Aare in 1825–1827, the common land in the floodplain (Au) was divided up and brought under cultivation. The construction of the motorway set off a land consolidation (1969–1979): the Giessen (overflow channels of the Aare) were filled in, the network of paths was renewed and farms were moved out onto the valley floor.

Good transport links (the Bern–Thun railway in 1859, the motorway in 1972) attracted newcomers from 1970 onward; housing was built in the village, as well as the new Fuhren quarter. The village once stretched along the old main road from Bern to Thun; in the 20th century, building increasingly extended up the eastern slope of the Aare valley. Nevertheless, at the beginning of the 21st century Niederwichtrach still had a rural character with small businesses, while in 2000 a good four-fifths of its employed residents worked outside the municipality. In 2004 Niederwichtrach merged with Oberwichtrach to form the municipality of Wichtrach.

== Bibliography ==
- Güterzusammenlegung Niederwichtrach 1969–79, 1980
- H. Schneeberger, Bauinventar der Gemeinde Niederwichtrach, Amtsbezirk Konolfingen, 1993
