= Public Service Announcement (disambiguation) =

A public service announcement (PSA) is a message in the public interest disseminated by the media without charge to raise public awareness and change behavior.

Public Service Announcement can also refer to:

- Public Service Announcement (album), 2010 album by Purling Hiss
- "Public Service Announcement" (song), 2003 song by Jay-Z
- Public Service Announcement Tour, 2022 reunion tour by Rage Against the Machine

== See also ==
- "Public Service Announcement 2000", song by Eminem on The Marshall Mathers LP
- PSA (disambiguation)
