= Oberwichtrach =

Former municipality in Bern, Switzerland

- Former municipality
- Oberwichtrach and the Aare from 500 m, aerial photograph by Walter Mittelholzer, 1922
- Location of Oberwichtrach
- Location within Switzerland Location within Canton of Bern
- Coordinates: 46.8428°N 7.5767°E
- Country: Switzerland
- Canton: Bern
- District: Konolfingen
- Municipality: Wichtrach

Population (2000)
  - Total: 2,377
- Time zone: UTC+01:00 (CET)
  - Summer (DST): UTC+02:00 (CEST)
- ISO 3166 code: CH-BE
- Website

Oberwichtrach is a former municipality in the Konolfingen District and the Bern-Mittelland administrative district of the canton of Bern, Switzerland. In 2004 it merged with Niederwichtrach to form the new municipality of Wichtrach. It lies on the right side of the Aare valley, on the main road from Bern to Thun, and comprised the village of Oberwichtrach, the village quarters of Station and Stockeren, and the hamlets of Oberwil and Niederwil.

== History ==
Oberwichtrach is first mentioned in 1180 as Wichtracho. It had 217 inhabitants in 1764, 562 in 1850, 650 in 1900, 895 in 1950, 1,664 in 1980 and 2,377 in 2000. A Hallstatt-period burial mound has been discovered in the Mauracherwald, and a large Roman villa with a necropolis near the church.

In the Middle Ages, the abbeys of Fraubrunnen, Frienisberg and Interlaken held property in Oberwichtrach. Einsiedeln Abbey is recorded in 1266 as landlord, holder of the court and patron of the church in Oberwichtrach. The local jurisdiction (Twing) was part of the district court (Landgericht) of Konolfingen, which belonged to the Kyburgs and from 1406 to Bern. In 1527, on the eve of the Reformation, Einsiedeln Abbey gave its property in Oberwichtrach to the then lord of Niederwichtrach, Sebastian von Stein, but Bern took Oberwichtrach for itself and paid off von Stein, who had kept the old faith. From then on, the banneret (Venner) in charge of the district court administered the banneret's court (Vennergericht) of Oberwichtrach, which included Häutligen and, from 1601, also Oppligen.

In 1591 the open-field village (Zelgdorf) of Oberwichtrach restricted the use of the common land (Allmend) by the Tauner (smallholders) living there, and in 1595 the farmers' community gave itself village regulations (Dorfordnung). The church in Oberwichtrach, mentioned in 1180 and dedicated to Saint Maurice, was the center of the parish, and later of the parish community, of Wichtrach. The present building was erected in 1745. In 1798 Oberwichtrach became part of the district of Steffisburg, and in 1803 of the Oberamt, later the district, of Konolfingen.

From the 16th century, dikes had to be built together with the neighboring villages against breaches of the Aare into the common land. After the correction of the Aare in 1825–1827, Oberwichtrach and Niederwichtrach divided up the floodplain (Au) and brought it under cultivation. In 1823 the municipality took in the open-field hamlet (Zelgweiler) of Wil-Drittel. In 1833 the Thalgut bridge over the Aare was built. The Bern–Thun railway line (station in 1859) had little effect on the municipality's growth; only after 1900 did Oberwichtrach gradually overtake Niederwichtrach.

The rapid population growth from 1960 onward led to new residential quarters in the Au and around the village center. Business zones arose near the station (factories for building materials and steel springs, timber construction) and on the motorway (a maintenance depot). In 2000, 78% of the employed residents of Oberwichtrach worked outside the municipality. The secondary school, which has existed since 1907, is run by an association of school municipalities. In 2004 Oberwichtrach merged with Niederwichtrach to form the municipality of Wichtrach.

== Bibliography ==
- Oberwichtrach – gestern und heute, 1991
- C. Rümelin, Bauinventar der Gemeinde Oberwichtrach, Amtsbezirk Konolfingen, 1993
