= Aeschlen bei Oberdiessbach =

Aeschlen
- Former municipality
- Flag Coat of arms
- Location of Aeschlen
- Location within Switzerland Location within Canton of Bern
- Coordinates: 46°50′N 7°39′E
- Country: Switzerland
- Canton: Bern
- District: Konolfingen

Area
  - Total: 4.9 km^{2} (1.9 sq mi)
- Elevation: 750 m (2,460 ft)

Population (December 2007)
  - Total: 305
  - Density: 62/km^{2} (160/sq mi)
- Time zone: UTC+01:00 (CET)
  - Summer (DST): UTC+02:00 (CEST)
- Postal code: 3672
- SFOS number: 601
- ISO 3166 code: CH-BE
- Surrounded by: Bleiken bei Oberdiessbach, Buchholterberg, Linden, Oberdiessbach
- Website: http://www.oberdiessbach.ch/

Aeschlen bei Oberdiessbach (officially known as Aeschlen) was a municipality in the district of Konolfingen in the canton of Bern in Switzerland. On 1 January 2010 the municipality of Aeschlen merged into the municipality of Oberdiessbach.

== History ==
Aeschlen is first mentioned in 1303 as Eschlon.

== Geography ==
Aeschlen had an area of 4.9 km^{2} (1.9 sq mi). Of this area, 60.2% is used for agricultural purposes, while 35.9% is forested. The rest of the land, (3.9%) is settled.

== Demographics ==
Aeschlen has a population (as of 31 December 2020) of 305. As of 2007, 1.6% of the population was made up of foreign nationals. Over the last 10 years the population has decreased at a rate of -7.3%. Most of the population (as of 2000) speaks German (97.5%), with Albanian being second most common ( 1.9%) and Serbo-Croatian being third ( 0.6%).

The age distribution of the population (as of 2000) is children and teenagers (0–19 years old) make up 28.7% of the population, while adults (20–64 years old) make up 59.3% and seniors (over 64 years old) make up 12%. In Aeschlen about 64.4% of the population (between age 25–64) have completed either non-mandatory upper secondary education or additional higher education (either University or a Fachhochschule).

Aeschlen has an unemployment rate of 1.3%. As of 2005, there were 72 people employed in the primary economic sector and about 20 businesses involved in this sector. 13 people are employed in the secondary sector and there are 5 businesses in this sector. 30 people are employed in the tertiary sector, with 9 businesses in this sector. The historical population is given in the following table:

year	population
1764	204
1850	455
1900	348
1950	321
1970	244
2000	317
