= PSA =

PSA, PsA, Psa, or psa may refer to:

== Biology and medicine ==
- Posterior spinal artery
- Primary systemic amyloidosis, a disease caused by the accumulation of abnormal proteins
- Prostate-specific antigen, an enzyme used as a blood tracer for prostate cancer
- Psoriatic arthritis, an inflammatory disease
- Pseudomonas aeruginosa, a species of bacterium
- Pseudomonas syringae pv. actinidiae, a pathovar of a bacterium that attacks kiwifruit

== Chemistry ==
- Polar surface area, the surface sum over all polar atoms of a molecule
- Pressure swing adsorption, a technology for separating, or purifying, gases

== Computing ==
- Professional services automation, software for automating project and billing management for professional service firms
- PSA Certified, Platform Security Architecture, a security certification for the Internet of Things
- Plesk Server Administrator, a commercial web hosting automation program
- Persistent staging area, a staging area in data vault modeling

== Contracts, legislation and government services ==
- Passenger Vessel Services Act of 1886 or Passenger Services Act, US
- Payment Services Act, Singapore
- Primary statistical area, a collective term for metropolitan, micropolitan, and combined statistical areas
- Problem-solution approach, an approach for assessing inventive step at the European Patent Office
- Production sharing agreement, a contract between a government and a resource extraction company
- Public Safety Act, a law in Jammu and Kashmir
- Public service agreement, UK government department targets for 3-year period
- Public service announcement, a message in the public interest disseminated by the media without charge
- Purchase and sale agreement, an agreement between a buyer and a seller

== Organizations and authorities ==
=== Australia ===
- Pharmaceutical Society of Australia
- Public Schools Association, Perth
- Public Service Association of NSW, a trade union
- The Salvation Army, Parramatta

=== United Kingdom ===
- Phone-paid Services Authority
- Political Studies Association, for academics
- Professional Standards Authority for Health and Social Care
- Property Services Agency, former government agency

=== United States ===
- Partnership for a Secure America
- Photographic Society of America
- Pi Sigma Alpha, college honor society for political science
- Poetry Society of America
- Poultry Science Association

=== Other country-specific organizations ===
- Partido Socialista Auténtico (Authentic Socialist Party, Argentina)
- New Zealand Public Service Association, trade union
- Palestinian Scout Association
- Parti Solidaire Africain (Democratic Republic of the Congo), defunct political party
- Partido Socialista Argentino, the Argentine Socialist Party, a now merged Argentinian political party
- Partido Socialista de Andalucía (Spain), former name of the Andalusian Party
- People's Struggle Alliance, Sri Lankan political alliance
- Petroleum Safety Authority Norway, governmental supervisory authority
- Philippine Statistics Authority
- Polish Society of Actuaries
- PSA BPOL a specialised police unit within the Federal Police of Germany
- PSA International (Singapore), formerly Port of Singapore Authority
- Public Servants Association of South Africa, trade union
- Public Services Association (Trinidad and Tobago), a trade union
- Socialist Party of Aragon (Partido Socialista de Aragón), a now defunct Spanish political party

=== World-wide scope ===
- Pacific Science Association
- Pacific Sociological Association
- Petroleum Safety Authority, former name of the Norwegian Ocean Industry Authority
- Philosophy of Science Association

== Sports ==
- Pro Snowboarders Association
- Professional Skaters Association
- Professional Sports Authenticator, an authenticator of sports, trading cards and similarly hand-signed artifacts
- Professional Squash Association

== Transport ==
- PSA Airlines, a subsidiary of American Airlines Group
- Pisa International Airport, Pisa, Italy, IATA code PSA
- Pacific Southwest Airlines, US, 1949 to 1988, ICAO code PSA
- Penn Station Access, a planned New York City rail upgrade
- PSA Group (Peugeot Société Anonyme), French multinational automobile manufacturer now part of Stellantis

== Other uses ==
- "PSA" (song) by SZA, from the album Lana (2023)
- PSA 5.7 Rock, a pistol
- Penal substitutionary atonement, a theory of atonement in Christianity
- Autonomous Socialist Party (disambiguation)
- Pisa language or Asue Awyu, ISO 639-3 code psa
- Piscis Austrinus (Southern Fish) constellation, IAU abbreviation PsA
- Public Storage stock ticker
- Power Station of Art, a contemporary art museum in Shanghai, China
- Pressure-sensitive adhesive
- "PSA", title of an earlier version of the R.E.M. song "Bad Day"
- Palmetto State Armory, an American firearms company based in Columbia, South Carolina.
