= Wichtrach =

- Municipality
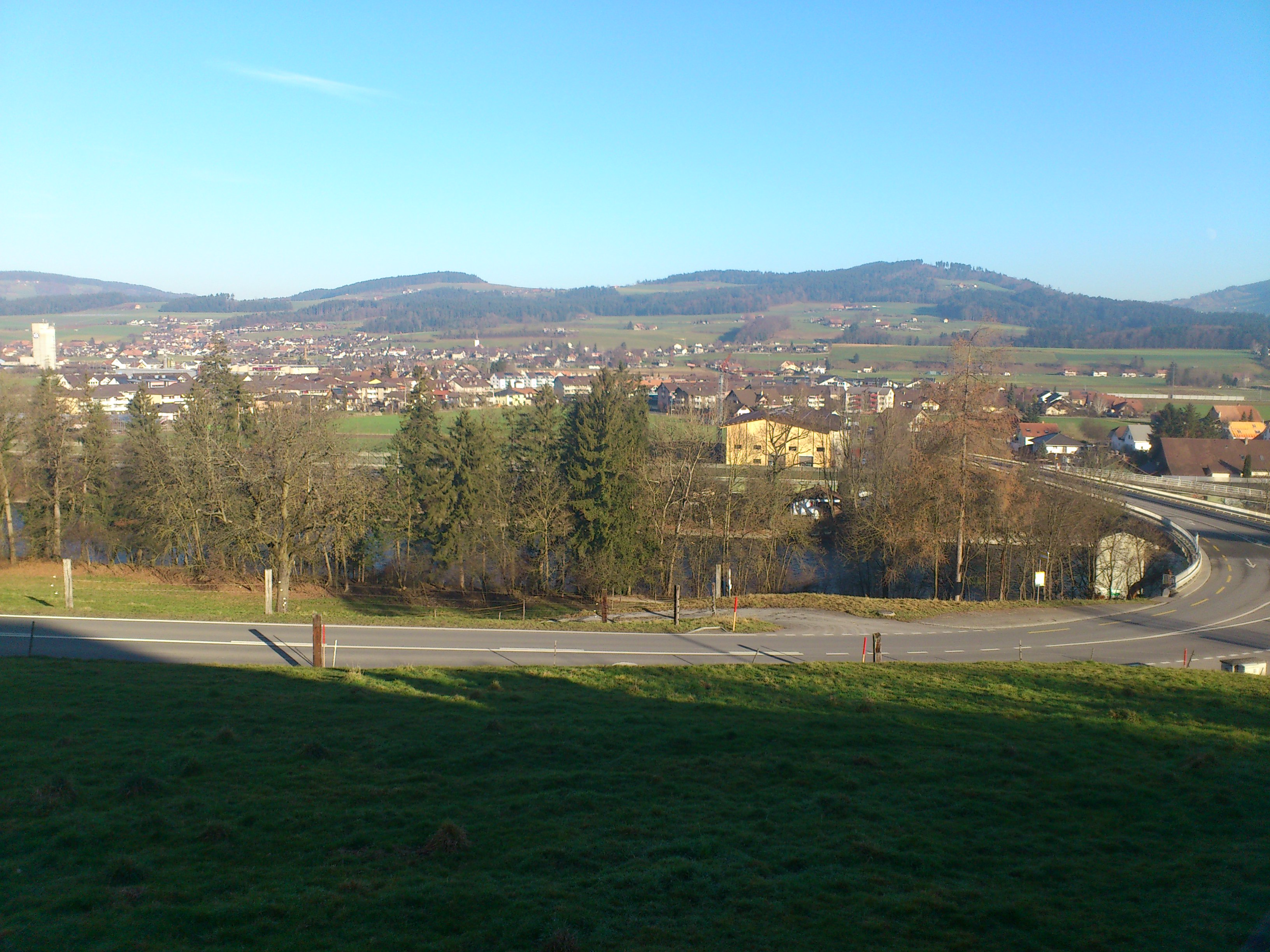

- Flag Coat of arms
- Location of Wichtrach
- Location within Switzerland Location within Canton of Bern
- Coordinates: 46°51′N 7°35′E
- Country: Switzerland
- Canton: Bern
- District: Bern-Mittelland

Government
  - Executive: Gemeinderat with 7 members
  - Mayor: Gemeindepräsident(in); Bruno Riem FDP/PLR (as of 2026)

Area
  - Total: 11.6 km^{2} (4.5 sq mi)
- Elevation: 538 m (1,765 ft)

Population (December 2020)
  - Total: 4,377
  - Density: 377/km^{2} (977/sq mi)
- Time zone: UTC+01:00 (CET)
  - Summer (DST): UTC+02:00 (CEST)
- Postal code: 3114
- SFOS number: 632
- ISO 3166 code: CH-BE
- Surrounded by: Gerzensee, Häutligen, Herbligen, Jaberg, Kiesen, Kirchdorf, Münsingen, Oberdiessbach, Oppligen, Tägertschi
- Website: www.wichtrach.ch

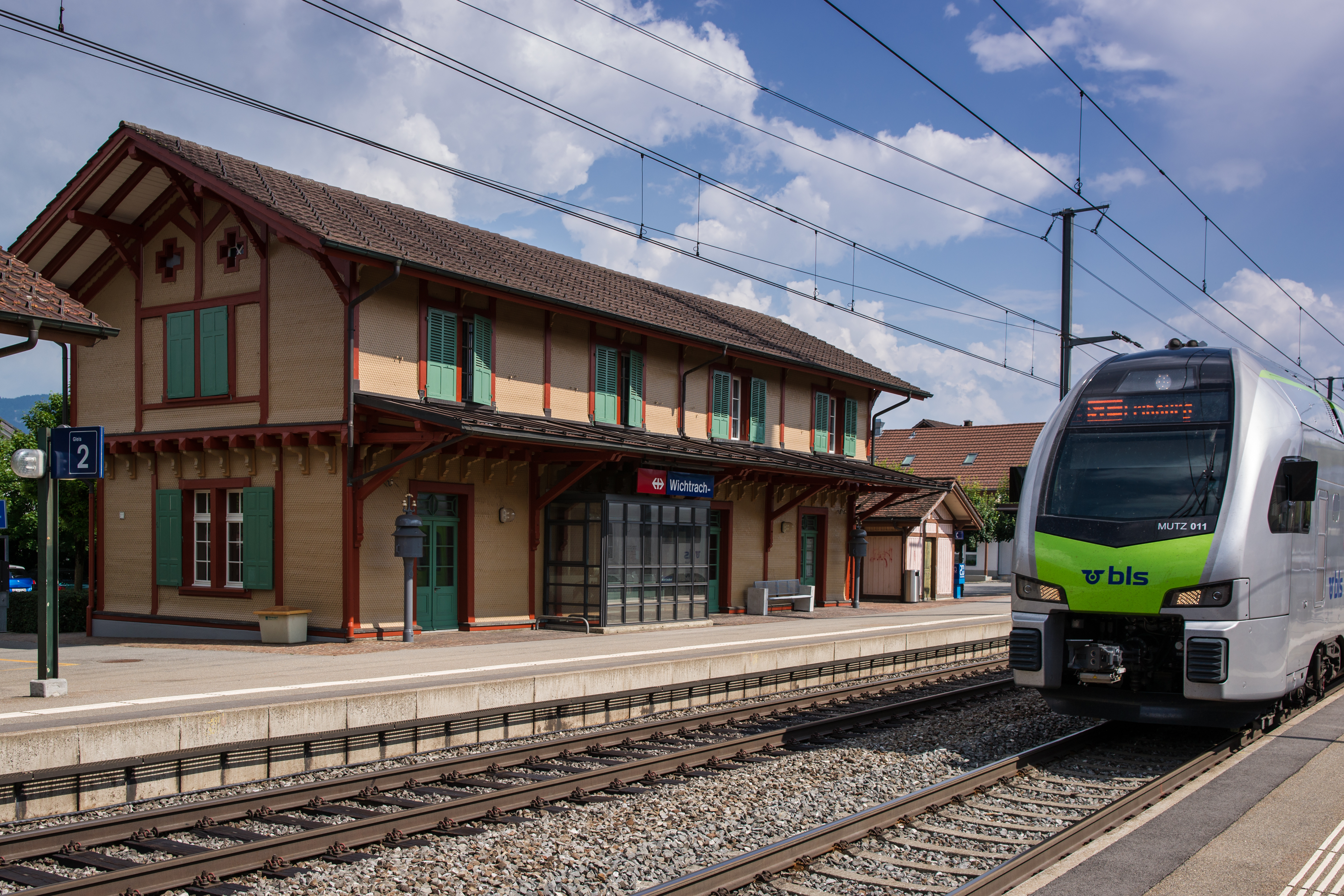
Train station

Wichtrach is a municipality in the Bern-Mittelland administrative district in the canton of Bern in Switzerland.

== History ==
Wichtrach was created on 1 January 2004, by uniting the independent municipalities of Niederwichtrach and Oberwichtrach. The parish church of Oberwichtrach was first mentioned in 1180. The two Wichtrach villages were first mentioned in 1180 as Wichtracho.

== Geography ==
Wichtrach has an area of 11.6 km^{2} (4.48 sq mi). As of 2012, a total of 7.35 km^{2} (2.84 mi^{2}) or 63.4% is used for agricultural purposes, while 2.59 km^{2} (1.00 mi^{2}) or 22.3% is forested. Of the rest of the land, 1.52 km^{2} (0.59 mi^{2}) or 13.1% is settled (buildings or roads), 0.11 km^{2} (27 acres) or 0.9% is either rivers or lakes and 0.02 km^{2} (4.9 acres) or 0.2% is unproductive land.

During the same year, housing and buildings made up 6.9% and transportation infrastructure made up 4.4%. Out of the forested land, all of the forested land area is covered with heavy forests. Of the agricultural land, 49.9% is used for growing crops and 12.1% is pastures, while 1.5% is used for orchards or vine crops. All the water in the municipality is flowing water.

On 1 January 2004 the former municipalities of Niederwichtrach and Oberwichtrach merged into the municipality of Wichtrach.

On 31 December 2009 Amtsbezirk Konolfingen, the municipality's former district, was dissolved. On the following day, 1 January 2010, it joined the newly created Verwaltungskreis Bern-Mittelland.

== Demographics ==
Wichtrach has a population (as of December 2020) of 4,377. As of 2010, 5.4% of the population are resident foreign nationals. Over the last 10 years (2001-2011) the population has changed at a rate of 0%. Migration accounted for -0.6%, while births and deaths accounted for 0.5%.

Most of the population (as of 2000) speaks German (94.7%) as their first language, French is the second most common (0.5%) and Italian is the third (1.1%).

As of 2008, the population was 50.2% male and 49.8% female. The population was made up of 1,897 Swiss men (47.2% of the population) and 120 (3.0%) non-Swiss men. There were 1,903 Swiss women (47.4%) and 99 (2.5%) non-Swiss women.

As of 2011, children and teenagers (0–19 years old) make up 21.4% of the population, while adults (20–64 years old) make up 63.3% and seniors (over 64 years old) make up 15.3%.

As of 2010, there were 488 households that consist of only one person and 76 households with five or more people. As of 2010, the construction rate of new housing units was 0.2 new units per 1000 residents. The vacancy rate for the municipality, in 2011, was 2.78%.

== Historic Population ==
The historical population is given in the following chart:

== Politics ==
In the 2015 federal election, the most popular party was the Swiss People's Party (SVP) which received 36.8% of the vote. The next three most popular parties were the Conservative Democratic Party (BDP) (14.5%), the Social Democratic Party (SP) (13.8%) and the FDP.The Liberals (9.6%). In the federal election, a total of 1,508 votes were cast, and the voter turnout was 48.0%.

== Economy ==
Aerial view of Aebi, Kraut & Co. by Walter Mittelholzer (1918-1937)

As of 2011, Wichtrach had an unemployment rate of 1.32%. As of 2008, there were a total of 967 people employed in the municipality. Of these, there were 120 people employed in the primary economic sector and about 46 businesses involved in this sector. 291 people were employed in the secondary sector and there were 41 businesses in this sector. 556 people were employed in the tertiary sector, with 92 businesses in this sector.

In 2008 there were a total of 760 full-time equivalent jobs. The number of jobs in the primary sector was 78, all of which were in agriculture. The number of jobs in the secondary sector was 270 of which 127 or (47.0%) were in manufacturing and 143 (53.0%) were in construction. The number of jobs in the tertiary sector was 412. In the tertiary sector; 111 or 26.9% were in wholesale or retail sales or the repair of motor vehicles, 15 or 3.6% were in the movement and storage of goods, 42 or 10.2% were in a hotel or restaurant, 5 or 1.2% were in the information industry, 38 or 9.2% were technical professionals or scientists, 71 or 17.2% were in education and 31 or 7.5% were in health care.

Of the working population, 27.6% used public transportation to get to work, and 50.2% used a private car.

== Religion ==
In 2000 about 78.2% of the population belonged to a Protestant church, 9.4% were Roman Catholic and 5.6% had no religious affiliation.

== Education ==
In Wichtrach about 62.5% of the population have completed non-mandatory upper secondary education, and 18.9% have completed additional higher education (either university or a Fachhochschule).

The Canton of Bern school system provides one year of non-obligatory Kindergarten, followed by six years of Primary school. This is followed by three years of obligatory lower Secondary school where the students are separated according to ability and aptitude. Following the lower Secondary students may attend additional schooling or they may enter an apprenticeship.

During the 2010-11 school year, there were a total of 588 students attending classes in Wichtrach. There were 4 kindergarten classes with a total of 78 students in the municipality. Of the kindergarten students, 6.4% were permanent or temporary residents of Switzerland (not citizens) and 9.0% have a different mother language than the classroom language. The municipality had 13 primary classes and 258 students. Of the primary students, 6.2% were permanent or temporary residents of Switzerland (not citizens) and 7.4% have a different mother language than the classroom language. During the same year, there were 12 lower secondary classes with a total of 252 students. There were 3.2% who were permanent or temporary residents of Switzerland (not citizens) and 4.0% have a different mother language than the classroom language.
