= International Snowboard Federation =

Former international sports governing body

- Sport: Snowboarding
- Jurisdiction: International
- Abbreviation: ISF (originally ISA)
- Founded: 1989
- Headquarters: Vancouver, Canada
- Closure date: 22 June 2002

The International Snowboard Federation was a body organised to run snowboarding competition.

The International Snowboard Association (ISA) was founded in 1989 and changed its name to the International Snowboard Federation (ISF) in 1991. Five nations and 120 racers established the Vancouver-based organisation. It sought to bring the world's best competitors together to test their skills in an environment which embraced competitiveness, but stressed the idea of having fun. The ISF eventually attracted riders of varying ages and abilities, which allowed one-time rising stars such as Terje Håkonsen, Daniel Franck and Danny Kass to sharpen their skills at an early age on their way to joining the professional ranks. The ISF set the standard for snowboarding competition, which contributed to the development of it as an Olympic sport in the 1998 Winter Olympics.

In a controversial move, the International Olympic Committee recognized the International Ski Federation (FIS) as the sport's official governing body. Three-time world champion Terje Håkonsen boycotted the Olympics as a result of the FIS being appointed to oversee the officiating. Other riders followed in Håkonsen's footsteps and concluded FIS rules to be inappropriate for snowboarding. The FIS has maintained its control over the Olympics, giving credence to the position that snowboarding is a discipline of skiing and not its own, individual sport.

Although the ISF continued to represent snowboarding on an international level, it began to lose influence, sponsors and finances to the FIS, and ceased operations on 22 June 2002. Later that year, the World Snowboard Federation (WSF) was formed. Twenty years later, FIS changed their official full name to the International Ski and Snowboard Federation.

== Former members ==
- Pro Snowboarders Associations
- National Snowboard Associations
- Snowboard Industry
- Resorts Associations
