= Bernese March =

Traditional Bernese anthem

Berner Marsch La Marche de Berne
English: Bernese March
- Cantonal anthem of Bern
- Music: Samuel Joneli von Boltigen, 1791
- Adopted: 1798

Audio sample
- file; help

The Bernese March (German Berner Marsch; French La Marche de Berne) is the traditional anthem of the Swiss Canton of Bern and is played at official occasions.

The march is of uncertain date; originally sung by Bernese mercenaries, it was adopted as the anthem of the Bernese Republic. It is now normally performed in the instrumental version.

== Lyrics ==
The following is the most frequently reproduced version of the traditional Bernese German lyrics, complemented with a Standard German and English translation by the authors of this article.

1.

Träm, träm, trädiridi,
Alli Manne standet i!
Die vor Ämme, die vor Aare,
Die wo ds Fuess u d'Sattle fahre!

2.

Träm, träm, trädiridi,
Mir wei freyi Schwyzer sy!
Rüeft is's Land zum Schutz a d'Gränze,
Lue, wie d'Ouge allne glänze!

3.

Träm, träm, trädiridi,
Üse Mutz isch gärn derby!
Stellet ne a d'Spitzi füre,
Sachermänt, är stieret's düre!

4.

Träm, träm, trädiridi,
Bis zum Tod muess g'stritte sy!
Üser Buebe müesse säge:
"Si sy gstorbe üsetwäge!"

1.

Träm, träm, trädiridi,
Alle Mannen, stehet ein!
Die von der Emme, die von der Aare:
Die zu Fuss und im Sattel fahren!

2.

Träm, träm, trädiridi,
Wir wollen freie Schweizer sein!
Ruft uns das Land zum Schutz an die Grenze,
Schau wie die Augen allen glänzen!

3.

Träm, träm, trädiridi,
Unser Bär ist gern dabei!
Stellt ihn nach vorne an die Spitze,
Sakerment, er setzt es durch!

4.

Träm, träm, trädiridi,
Bis zum Tod muss gestritten sein!
Unsere Buben müssen sagen:
"Sie sind gestorben unsertwegen!"

1.

Pom, pom, tra-ri-di-ri,
All men into rank and file!
Those of the Emme, those of the Aar:
Those by foot and saddle fare!.

2.

Pom, pom, tra-ri-di-ri,
We want to be free Swiss men!
When the country calls us to the border for protection,
See how all our eyes are gleaming!

3.

Pom, pom, tra-ri-di-ri,
Our Bear likes to join in!
Put him at the very head,
Zounds! he'll force it through!

4.

Pom, pom, tra-ri-di-ri,
To the death let the struggle be!
Our boys must tell:
"They died for our sake!"

An older variant of the text replaces "Stark und frey in Not und G'fahre" in the first stanza with "Die, wo z'Fuess und z'Sattel fahre" ("Those on foot and those in the saddle").
