= Autonomous Socialist Party =

Autonomous Socialist Party may refer to:

- Autonomous Socialist Party (France)
- Autonomous Socialist Party (Jura)
- Autonomous Socialist Party (Ticino)
