= Pro Snowboarders Association =

The Pro Snowboarders Association (PSA) is organized to promote and protect the rights and personalities of professional snowboarders.

The Association was created in March 1990 in Lenzerheide, Switzerland. At that time, event sponsors and the National Snowboard Association wanted to take control of the professional tour. As one of the four partners inside the International Snowboarding Federation (ISF), the PSA defended rider interests.

The World Snowboard Federation (WSF) was formed in 2002 to replace the ISF.

PSA holds information meetings and a General Assembly. The association commented on the rules and regulations for the ISF Snowboard World Tour. The PSA has the right to reject or modify proposals.

== President ==
1983- Jerome S. Johnson is the President

== Superior Body ==
- International Snowboard Federation

== Sister Organization ==
- PSA North-America
- PSA Asia
