= Konolfingen District =

Coordinates: 46°54′N 7°36′E

Konolfingen Amtsbezirk Konolfingen
- District
- Flag Coat of arms

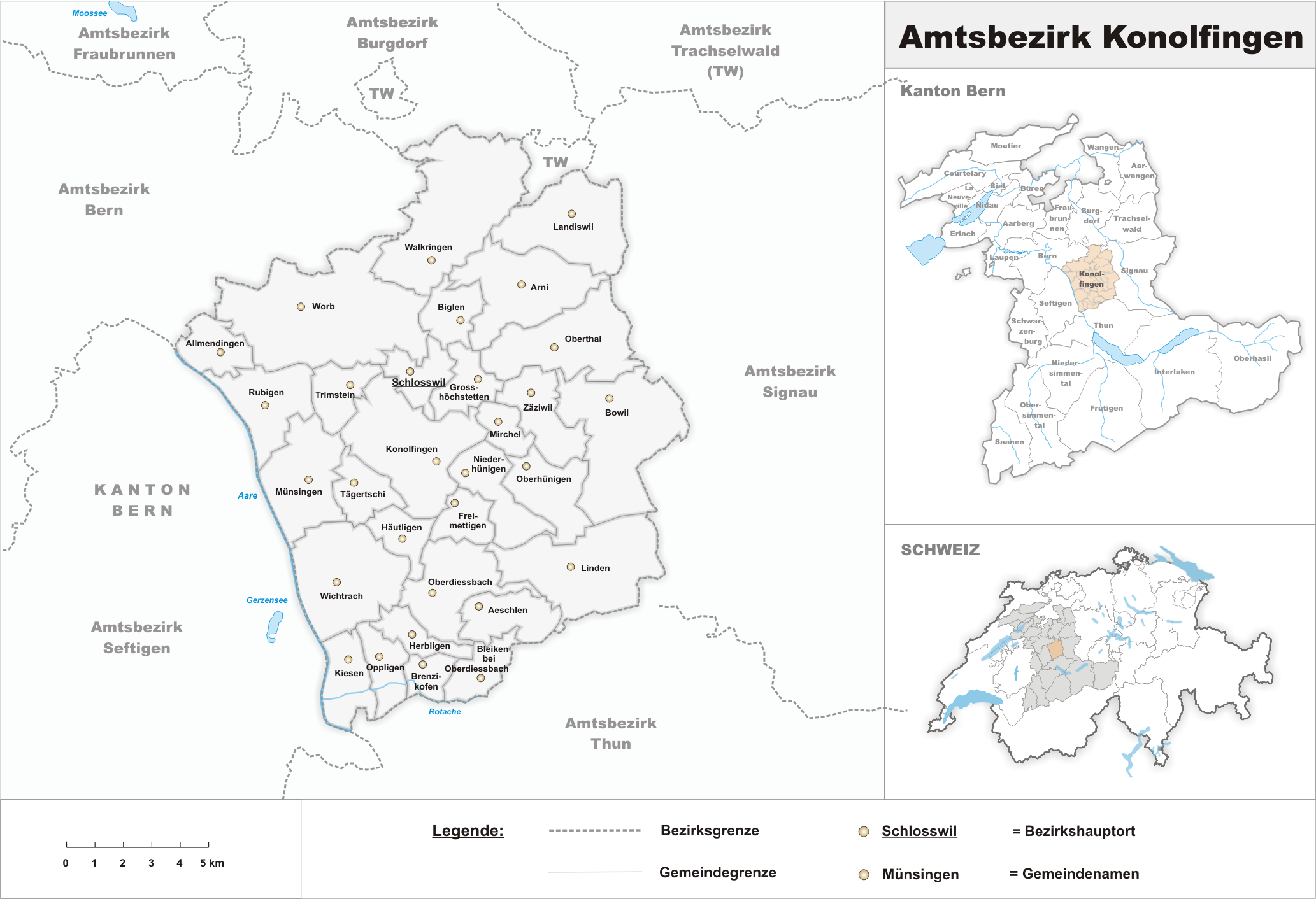
- Country: Switzerland
- Canton: Bern
- Capital: Konolfingen

Area
  - Total: 214 km^{2} (83 sq mi)

Population (2007)
  - Total: 57,249
  - Density: 268/km^{2} (693/sq mi)
- Time zone: UTC+1 (CET)
  - Summer (DST): UTC+2 (CEST)
- Municipalities: 29

Konolfingen District is a district in the canton of Bern, Switzerland. While being an administrative district with power, its capital was the town of Konolfingen. The district contains 12 municipalities covering an area of 153 km^{2} (59 sq mi):

From 1 January 2010, the district lost its administrative power while being replaced by the Bern-Mittelland (administrative district), whose administrative centre is Ostermundigen.

Since 2010, it remains therefore a fully recognised district under the law and the Constitution (Art.3 al.2) of the Canton of Berne.

The district consistes of 29 municipalities in an area of 214 km².

- CH-3112 Allmendingen bei Bern
- CH-3508 Arni bei Biglen
- CH-3507 Biglen
- CH-3674 Bleiken bei Oberdiessbach
- CH-3533 Bowil
- CH-3671 Brenzikofen
- CH-3510 Freimettigen
- CH-3506 Grosshöchstetten
- CH-3510 Häutligen
- CH-3671 Herbligen
- CH-3629 Kiesen
- CH-3510 Konolfingen
- CH-3434 Landiswil
- CH-3673 Linden BE
- CH-3532 Mirchel
- CH-3110 Münsingen
- CH-3504 Niederhünigen
- CH-3672 Oberdiessbach
- CH-3504 Oberhünigen
- CH-3531 Oberthal
- CH-3629 Oppligen
- CH-3113 Rubigen
- CH-3082 Schlosswil
- CH-3502 Tägertschi
- CH-3083 Trimstein
- CH-3512 Walkringen
- CH-3114 Wichtrach
- CH-3076 Worb
- CH-3532 Zäziwil

== Mergers ==
On 1 January 2010 the municipality of Aeschlen merged into the municipality of Oberdiessbach.
