= Autonomous Socialist Party (Jura) =

Political party

The Autonomous Socialist Party of Southern Jura (French: Parti socialiste autonome du Sud du Jura, PSA-SJ, or PSA), is a Swiss francophone subcantonal political party in the Northern Bernese Jura district of the Canton of Bern, affiliated to the Jura Socialist Party, itself a part of the Swiss Socialist Party (SP/PS). It coexists with the Bernese Jura Socialist Party (PSJB), affiliated to the cantonal Bernese Socialist Party, also affiliated to the federal SP/PS. The PSA favours a unification of the French-speaking district of the Canton of Bern with the French-speaking Canton of Jura, while the PSJB opposes it.

The Bernese voters who voted for this party in cantonal or local elections were voting for a party that had its statutory existence in another canton, that of Jura. It's the only case in Switzerland where a federation of a cantonal party was running for elections in another canton.

After the municipal vote of Moutier to join the Canton of Jura in 2021, solving the Jura Question that lasted since 1947, the party kept its name in Moutier but changed its name in the rest of the Bernese Jura to Ensemble Socialiste (ES) in 2022.

On 3 May 2024, Ensemble Socialiste merged with a local and independent social-democratic party in Tavannes called Platforme.Socialiste and with the Bernese Jura Socialist Party (PSJB) to form the new bernese section of PS Grand Chasseral.

After the Jura elections in October 2025 and the Bernese elections in 2026, the Autonomous Socialist Party will disappear under its current name to be a local federation of the Jura Socialist Party in Moutier.
