= Canton of Bern =

Canton of Switzerland

Canton of Bern: Kanton Bern (German); Canton de Berne (French)
- Canton
- Flag Coat of arms Brandmark
- Interactive map of Canton of Bern
- Coordinates: 46.84°N 7.60°E
- Country: Switzerland
- Capital: Bern
- Subdivisions: 334 municipalities, 10 districts

Government
  - President: Evi Allemann
  - Executive: Regierungsrat, Conseil exécutif (7)
  - Legislative: Grosser Rat, Grand conseil (160)

Area
  - Total: 5,959.59 km^{2} (2,301.01 sq mi)

Population (December 2020)
  - Total: 1,043,132
  - Density: 175.034/km^{2} (453.336/sq mi)

GDP
  - Total: CHF 80.209 billion (2020)
  - Per capita: CHF 77,027 (2020)
- ISO 3166 code: CH-BE
- Highest point: 4,274 m (14,022 ft): Finsteraarhorn
- Lowest point: 401.5 m (1,317 ft): Aare at Wynau
- Joined: 1353
- Languages: German, French
- Website: be.ch

The canton of Bern or Berne is one of the 26 cantons forming the Swiss Confederation. Its capital city, Bern, is also the de facto capital of Switzerland. The bear is the heraldic symbol of the canton, displayed on a red-yellow background.

Comprising ten districts, Bern is the second-largest canton by both surface area and population. Located in west-central Switzerland, it is surrounded by eleven cantons. It borders the cantons of Jura and Solothurn to the north. To the west lie the cantons of Neuchâtel, Fribourg, and Vaud. To the south lies the canton of Valais. East of the canton of Bern lie the cantons of Uri, Nidwalden, Obwalden, Lucerne and Aargau. The geography of the canton includes a large share of all three natural regions of Switzerland: the Jura Mountains (the Bernese Jura), the Swiss Plateau (the Bernese Mittelland) and the Alps (the Bernese Oberland).

The canton of Bern is bilingual, officially German- and French-speaking, and has a population (as of 31 December 2020) of 1,043,132. The largest city, Bern, is also the seat of the federal government of Switzerland. Other major cities are Thun and Biel/Bienne. The canton is also renowned for its numerous Alpine resort towns, notably Interlaken and Gstaad.

Formerly part of the Holy Roman Empire, the canton of Bern entered an alliance with the Swiss Forest Cantons in 1323 and joined the Old Swiss Confederacy in 1353.

== History ==
Bern joined the Old Swiss Confederation in 1353. Between 1803 and 1814 it was one of the six directorial cantons of the Napoleonic Swiss Confederation.

=== Early prehistory ===
The earliest traces of a human presence in the area of the modern Canton is found in three caves in the Simmental region; Schnurenloch near Oberwil, Ranggiloch above Boltigen and Chilchlihöhle above Erlenbach. These caves were used at various times during the last ice age. The first open-air settlement in the area is an Upper Paleolithic settlement at Moosbühl in Moosseedorf. During the warmer climate of the Mesolithic period, increasing forest cover restricted the movement of hunters, fishers and gatherers. Their temporary settlements were built along lake and marsh edges, which remained free of trees due to fluctuations in water level. Important Mesolithic sites in the Canton are at Pieterlenmoos and Burgäschisee lake along with alpine valleys at Diemtig and Simmental. During the Neolithic period, there were a number of settlements on the shores of Lake Biel, the Toteisbecken (Lobsigensee, Moossee, Burgäschisee and Inkwilersee) and along rivers (Aare, Zihl). Several of these sites are part of the Prehistoric Pile dwellings around the Alps, a UNESCO World Heritage Site.

One of the best explored Neolithic sites is at Twann (now Twann-Tüscherz). In the Twannbach delta there were about 25 Cortaillod culture and Horgen culture villages that existed between 3800 and 2950 BC. One of the oldest examples of bread from Switzerland, a sourdough from 3560 to 3530 BC, came from one of these villages. A preserved Bronze Age dugout boat has been found on the dried out lake bed, it was part of lake village near Twann, a stone-lined well had been dug near the preserved boat in 1874.

=== Iron Age ===
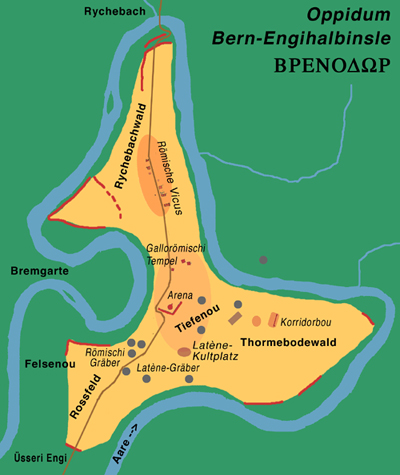
Helveto-Roman settlement Bern-Engehalbinsel

During the Early Iron Age changes in climate forced the Hallstatt culture (800–450 BCE) to abandon settlements along many waterways and in the valley floors and move to the plateaus and hills. With increased trade contacts across the Alps, the cultural influence of the Mediterranean region grew in the area. Evidence of this trade include a hydria which was discovered in Grächwil. Burial rituals and social classes became more developed during this time. The so-called princely graves became more common, many of the burial mounds were over 30 m (98 ft) in diameter and 4 m (13 ft) high and richly outfitted with grave goods. In a grave mound in Bützberg the first burial in the mound was followed by several later burials. Often, several grave mounds combined to become a necropolis, such as at Grossaffoltern, Ins, Bannwil, Langenthal and Bützberg. Most of the knowledge about the Hallstatt culture in the Canton comes from graves. The only discovered settlement is around Blanche Church in La Neuveville.

The grave goods show that iron was forged into swords, daggers, spearheads, knives and wagon accessories. Gold, which was probably collected from river sand, was made into diadems, rings and pendants. Thin bronze arm, leg and neck plates with geometric designs were often buried, especially in the graves at Allenlüften in Mühleberg, at Ins and at Bützberg. The jewelry that was buried included bracelets and rings which were also made of jet and lignite coal. At Münchringen, the grave pottery was both shaped by hand or thrown on a potter's wheel, and was painted with multi-colored ornamentation.

The transition to the Late Iron Age of the La Tène culture (450−1st century BCE) is indicated by a sudden change of style in the metalworking and ceramic industries. Numerous graves (from unknown settlements), along with the two oppida at Bern-Engehalbinsel and Jensberg by Studen, mark the population centers during the late Iron Age. Gold coins (from Melchnau) along with silver and bronze coins first start to appear during this era. A sword with Greek characters that said Korisios was found at the Port site. At the oppidum at Bern-Engehalbinsel, there were studios for glass and ceramic production, and iron working achieved a high level of skill, along with craftsmen who worked in wood, leather and goldsmithing. There was a nearby place of worship in the Bremgarten wood, and cemeteries at Münsingen and Bern-Engehalbinsel.

=== Roman era ===
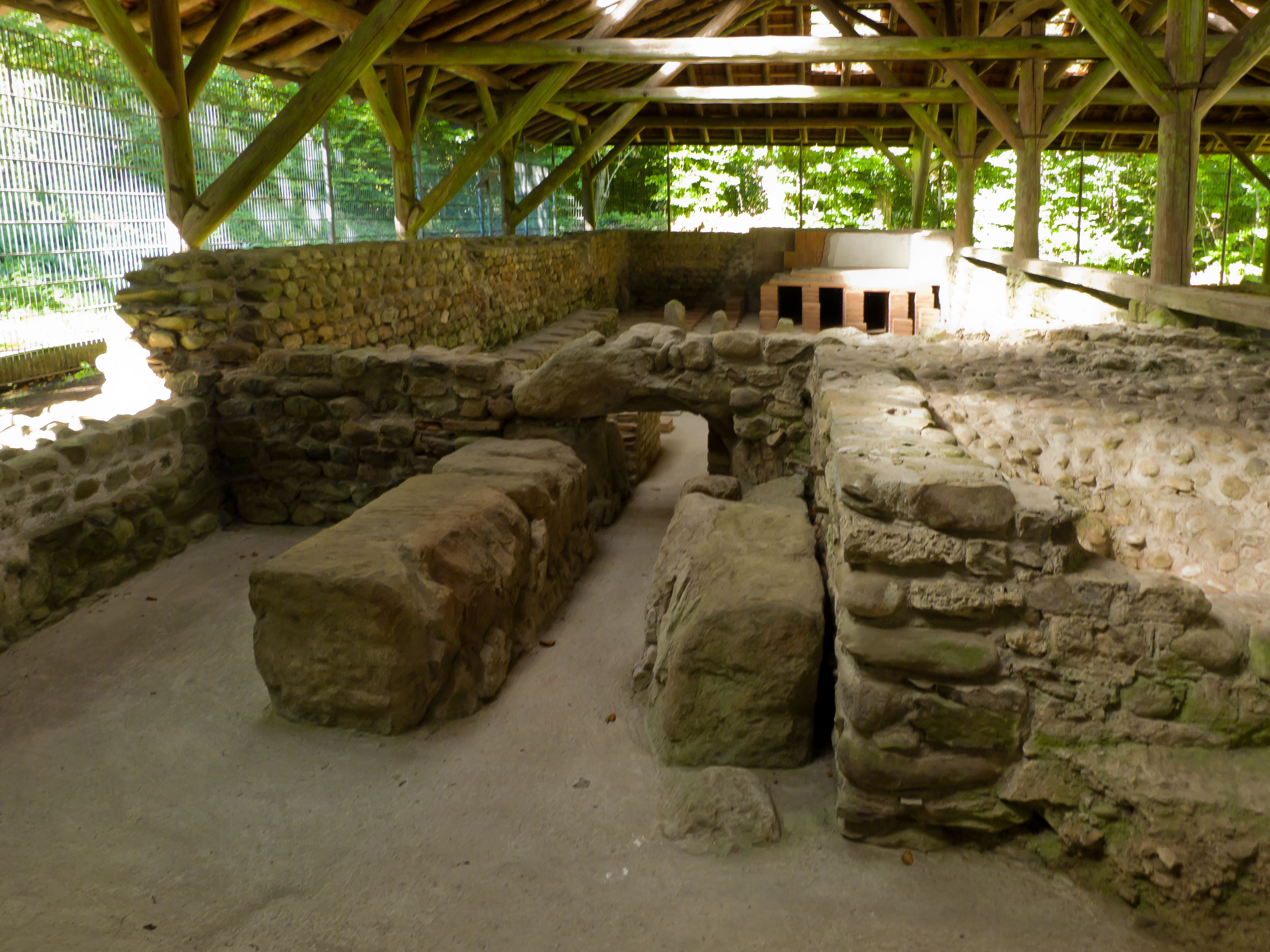
Baths at Engehalbinsel near Bern

After the Roman era victory at Battle of Bibracte in 58 BCE, the Helvetii were forced to return to their homes as foederati of the Romans. Under increasing Roman influence, the local economy and trade flourished. The main settlements lay at the foot of the Jura Mountains and on the Central Plateau.

The existing roads were expanded, especially the Aventicum-Vindonissa and the Petinesca-Augusta Raurica roads. A fourth alpine pass, the Rawil pass, was added to the traditional three; the Grimsel, Brünig and Susten passes. In the Bernese Jura the Mont Raimeux and Pierre Pertuis passes opened.

Under the Romans, many of the old fortified places were expanded and refortified. The old Helvetii oppidum at the Engehalbinsel became a Roman vicus, which was probably known as Brenodor or Brenodurum. At the foot of the Jens mountain, the fort Petinesca was built to guard the roads over the Jura Mountains. This was reinforced in the late-Roman era (368–369 CE) by a fortified bridge over the Thielle/Zihl river between Aegerten and Brügg.

A number of Roman villas were built around the Canton. At Oberwichtrach both the main building (pars urbana) and the industrial section (pars rustica) of a Roman villa have been discovered. The villas at Münsingen, Toffen and Herzogenbuchsee have richly detailed Roman mosaics that are still partly visible.

The religious practices of the local population merged with Roman beliefs and the Canton of Bern is home to a number of unique cult centers. They include the larger than life statues of gods (including enthroned Jupiter) at Petinesca, Engehalbinsel, and Thun-Allmendingen; and a number of stone inscriptions. At the beginning of the 5th century CE, Rome withdrew its troops from the Rhine garrisons, but allowed the Burgundians to settle on Helvetii lands in 443 CE.

=== Early Middle Ages ===
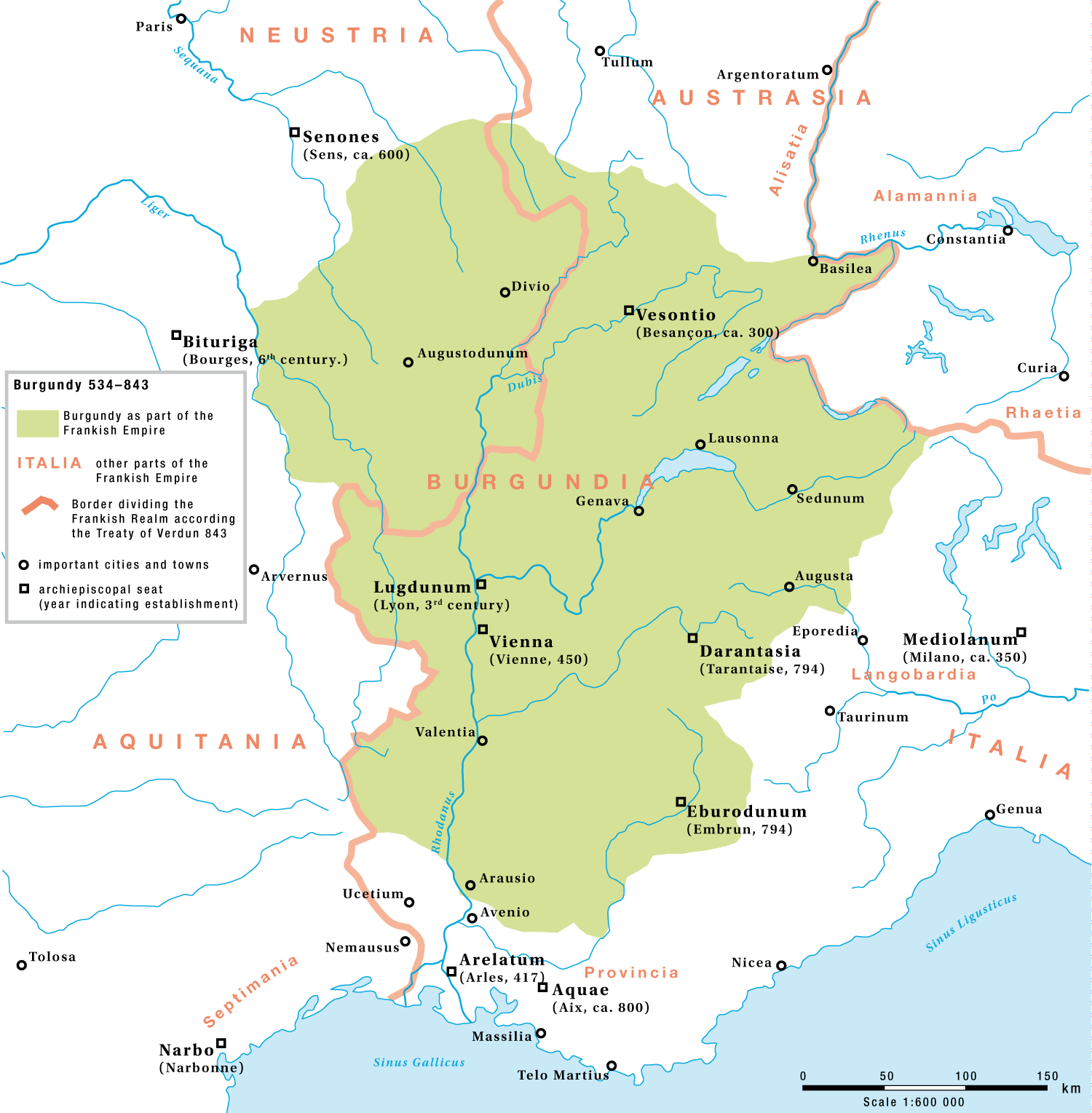
Burgundian and Allamanni lands between 534 and 843

East of the Aare, the transition from the Gallo-Roman dominated population to a Germanic population in the Early Middle Ages happened relatively peacefully. One exception was the Battle of Wangen in 610, but elsewhere it generally was a slow process of cultural infiltration. By the 7th century, the Alamannic settlers had already taken most of the good locations southeast of the Aare and they began moving up the Aare to the regions of Lake Thun and Lake Brienz. All areas west of the Aare belonged to the romanised Burgundian kingdom, which became part of the Merovingian Frankish kingdom in the 534. During the Carolingian era, the political structure of the Franks had spread into parts of what became Switzerland. In 762/778 the County of Aargau was founded, followed in 861 by the County of Oberaargau and in 965 the County of Bargen. The Treaty of Verdun in 843 put the border between Central and Eastern Frankish Empires at the Aare, and divided the Aare region in half. The population west of the Aare generally spoke a Romance language, while those to the east spoke a Germanic language. The region between the rivers Saane and Aare became the language border.

Christianity spread slowly into the Aare valley. The dioceses of Lausanne, Basel, Sion, Chur and Constance were all established before the new faith made inroads into the valley. The Aare valley was bordered by three dioceses; Lausanne, Constance and Basel. However, the first Christian missionaries came into the valley from Alsace and other western areas. In 630 the Abbey of Luxeuil established the Abbey of Moutier-Grandval along the old transit route through the Pierre Pertuis Pass. By the 9th or 10th century, this abbey had property and influence all the way to Lake Biel and into the Balsthal valley. The first monastic cells of what would become the Abbey of Saint-Imier was also founded in 600. In the Seeland and Aare valleys, wooden churches were first built during the Merovingian period. The current churches in Kirchlindach, Oberwil bei Buren and Bleibach were all built above the ruins of these early churches. About 30 churches in the Bern and Solothurn portions of the Aare valley were created over ruins of Roman villas and subsequent burial grounds in the 7th century (including Meikirch and Oberbipp). In Mett, the church was built over a 5th-century mausoleum, which was built over a 4th-century tomb. In 700, six sarcophagi were buried on St. Peter's Island next to a Roman temple complex. A wooden monastery was built over the complex in the 8th–9th century.

=== Middle Ages ===
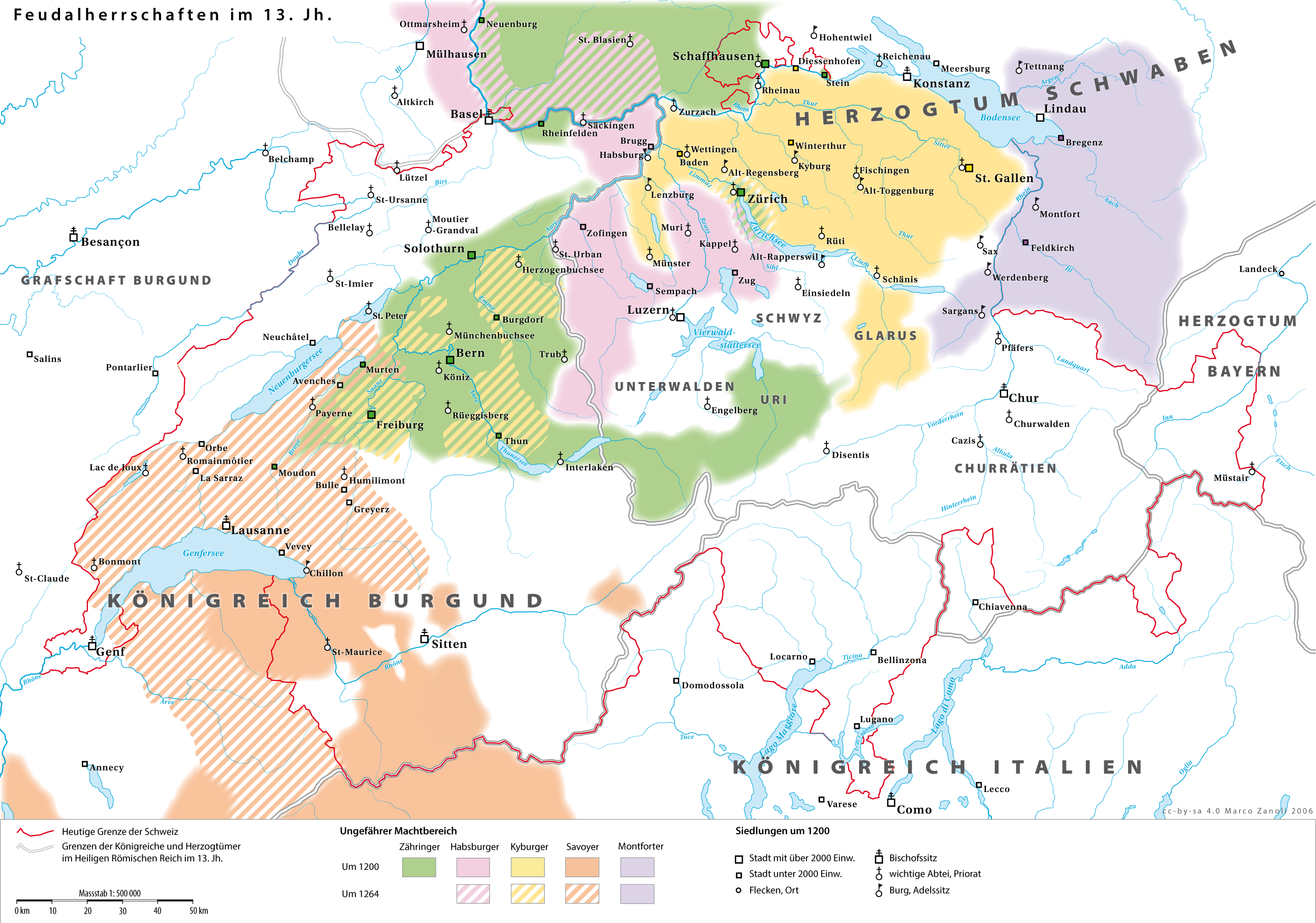
Lands held by the main noble families around 1200

During the 10th century, the Aare valley came fully under the Second Kingdom of Burgundy. Under King Rudolph I and his son Rudolph II Burgundy's influence reached across most of modern Switzerland. They established royal courts at Bümpliz, Münsingen, Uetendorf, Wimmis, Kirchberg and Utzenstorf to allow them to govern the Aare valley. Later, the Aare valley moved toward closer ties with the Holy Roman Empire during the Ottonian and Salian dynasties.

The succession dispute following the death of Rudolph III in 1032 allowed the Salian kings to acquire the Kingdom of Upper Burgundy and with it the Aare valley. As a part of the Holy Roman Empire, the valley was involved when the Investiture Controversy broke out in 1056. In 1077, the Regent of Burgundy, Count Rudolf of Rheinfelden, declared himself as an anti-king against King Henry IV. The Bishops of Basel and Lausanne remained loyal to King Henry IV, and took the Rheinfelden lands in Oberaargau and the upper Aare valley. After Rudolf's death in 1090, his lands went to his daughter, and through her, to Berchtold II of Zähringen. He and his son, Berchtold III, tried to use these lands to expand their power. In 1127 the Zähringer were appointed Rector or delegate of the king in Burgundy. Their hopes for a new, independent Burgundy were dashed in 1156, and the last Zähringen count, Berchtold V, embarked on a program of city founding. The cities of Burgdorf, Murten, Thun and Bern were all founded by Berchtold V. When he died without an heir, the Zähringen lands went to the House of Kyburg, while the offices and fiefs reverted to the empire.

During the High Middle Ages both the Aare valley and the Bernese Oberland were divided into a number of small counties, each with their own baron. Nobles from the Holy Roman Empire began to marry into the local noble families and a number of the Zähringen Ministerialis families (unfree knights in the service of a feudal overlord) moved into the Oberland. The nobles also began to found monasteries to spread their power into the Oberland. During the period between 1070 and 1150, at least ten large monasteries were founded by local nobles. These include; the Cluniac Priory of Rüeggisberg (Lords of Rümligen in 1072), Münchenwiler (Wiler family in 1080), St. Peter's Island (Count of Hochburgund-Mâcon in the late 11th century), Hettiswil (1107), Röthenbach im Emmental (Lords of Rümligen or Signau), the Benedictine monastery at St. Johannsen in Erlach (Fenis family in 1100), Trub (Lords of Lützelflüh before 1130) and Rüegsau (possibly also the Lords of Lützelflüh in first half of the 12th century), the Augustinian Collegiate church in Interlaken (Oberhofen family in 1130) and the Cistercian Frienisberg Abbey (Count Saugern around 1130). However, in 1191 the Oberland barons revolted against Berchtold V of Zähringen and many of the Oberland barons were killed in the battle of Grindelwald.

During the 13th century a number of the cities near Bern were granted the city right and appointed mayors and city councils. Bern became an imperial city. During the mid-13th century, the Empire's presence weakened in the Aare valley, forcing the local nobles to find allies to protect themselves. Bern entered into a number of treaties with its neighbors in the 13th century. In 1274, the Emperor Rudolph I of Habsburg, confirmed Bern's imperial immediacy. However, in 1285 he imposed an imperial tax which drove the city to support Rudolph's enemies. Although it withstood two sieges by the Emperor in 1288, after the defeat at Schosshalde in 1289 it had to pay taxes and a penalty.

In 1298 Bernese forces won a victory at Oberwangen in Köniz against the County of Savoy and the Habsburg Austrian nobility. In 1300, the city acquired the four surrounding parishes of Bolligen, Vechigen, Stettlen and Muri, destroyed the threatening castles of Bremgarten and Belp and gave the Baron of Montenach Bernese citizenship. After the victory of Louis IV of Bavaria over the Habsburg Frederick the Fair in the battle of Mühldorf (Bavaria) in 1322, Bern entered an alliance with the anti-Habsburg Swiss Forest Cantons in 1323.

=== Old Swiss Confederacy ===
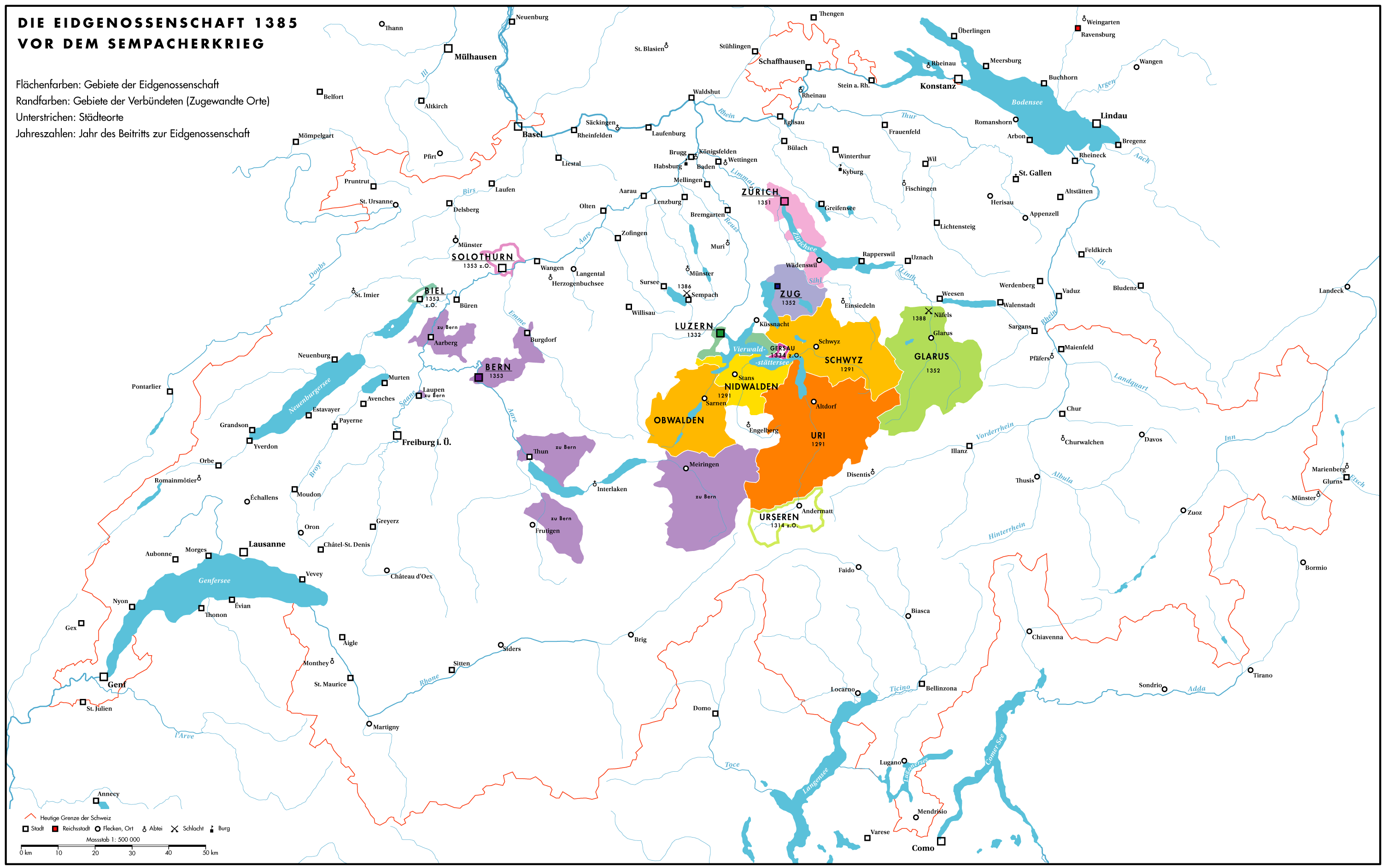
The Swiss Confederacy before the Battle of Sempach (1387)

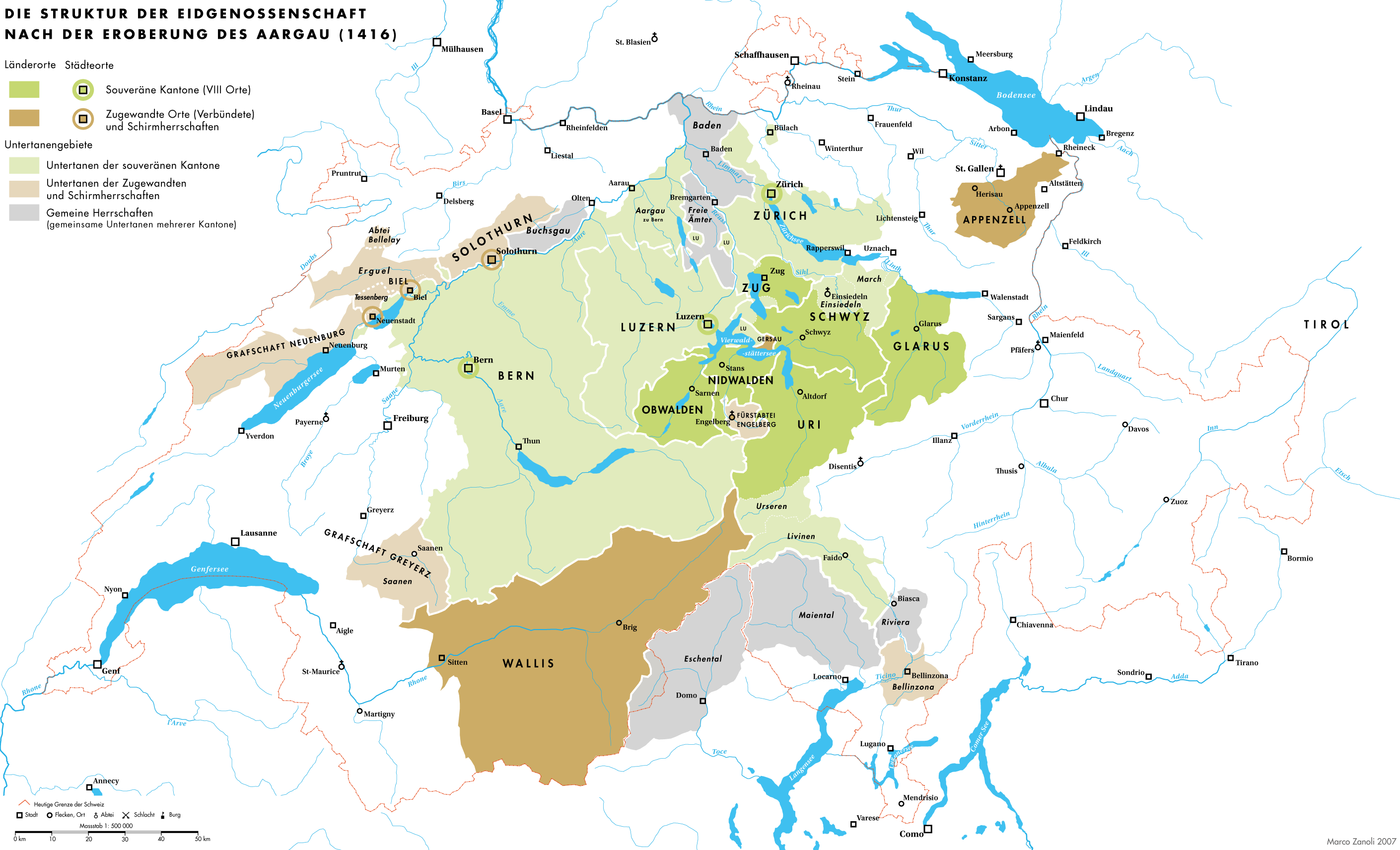
The Swiss Confederacy in 1416

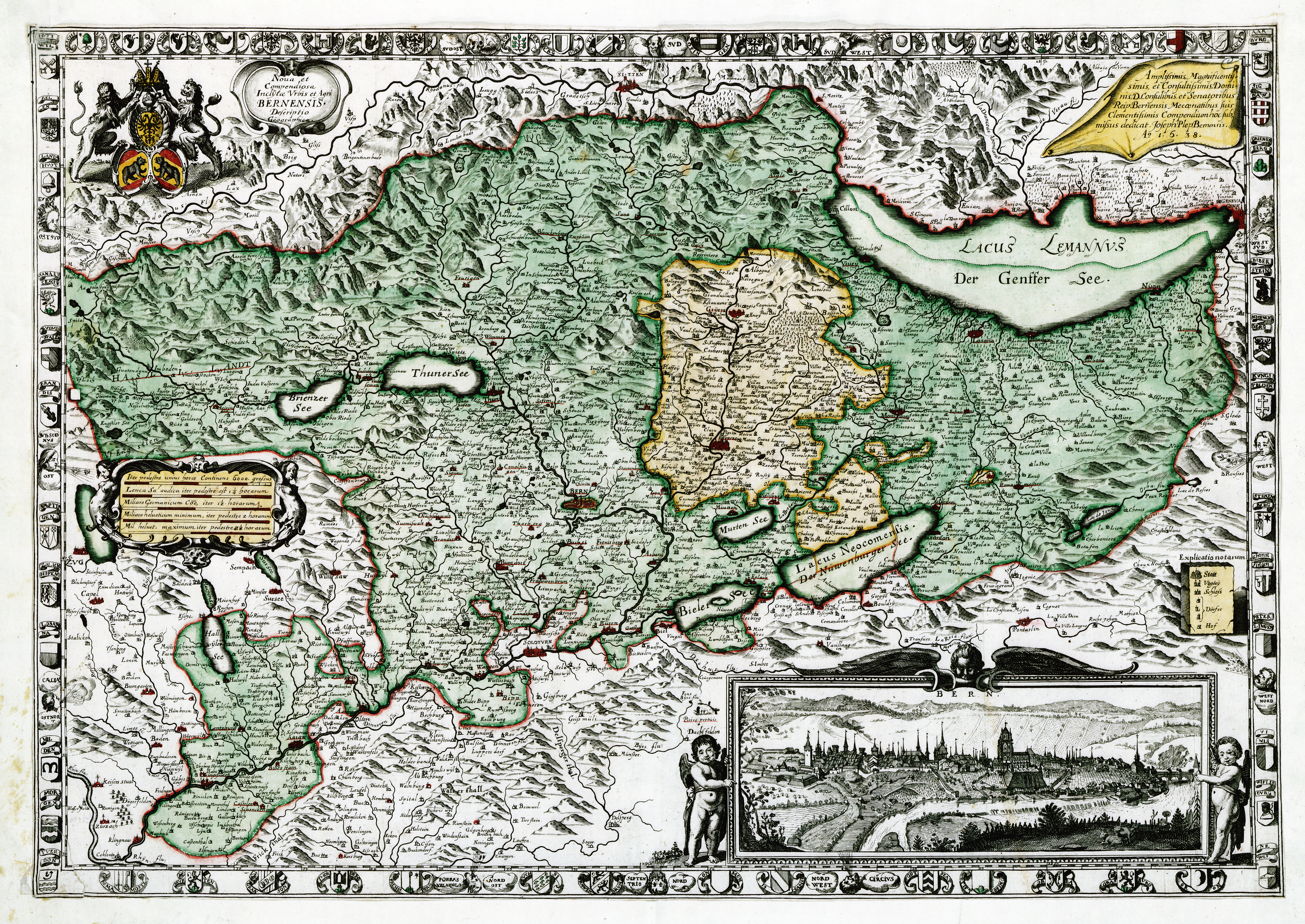
Map of the Bernese territory from 1638

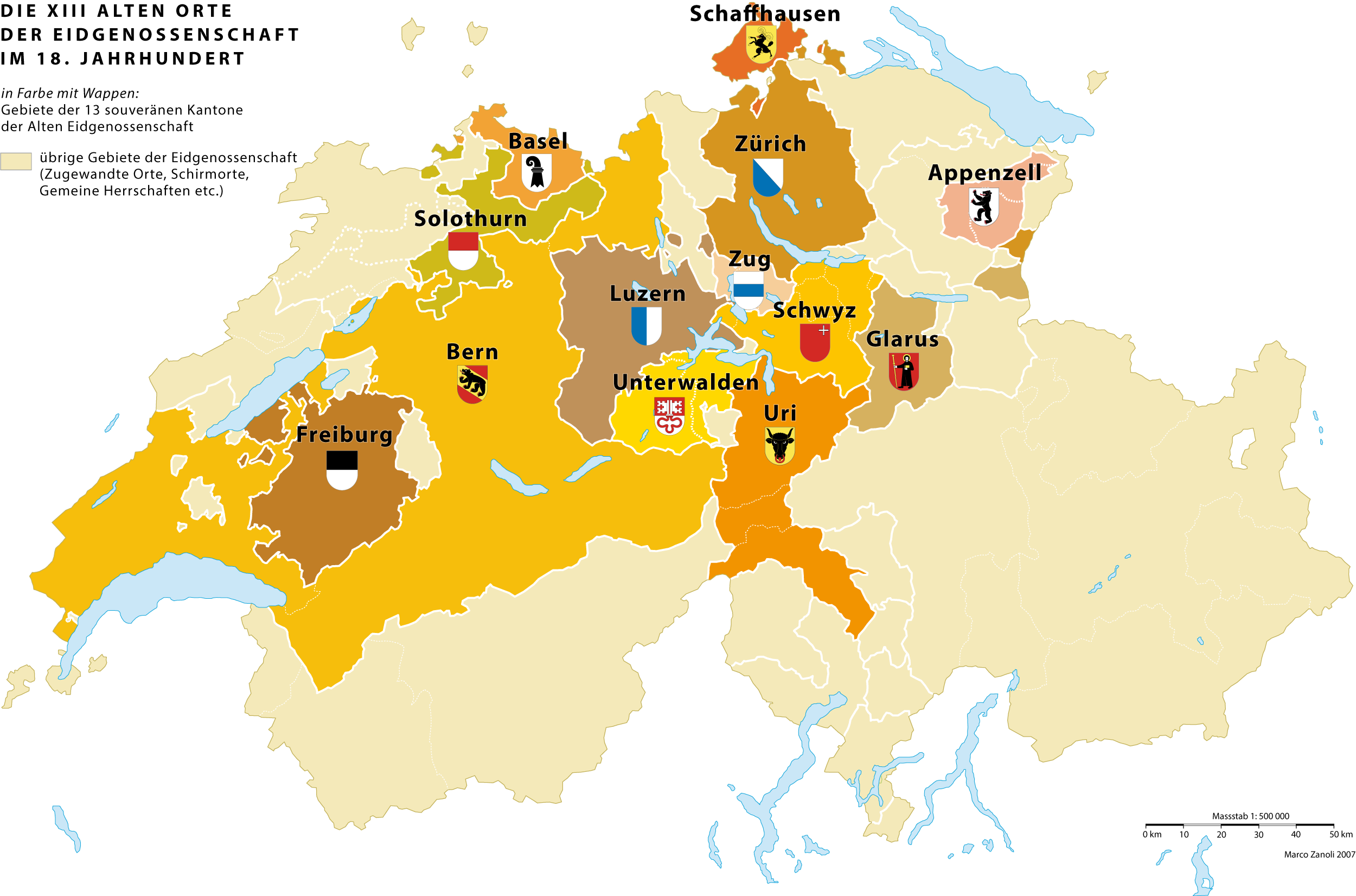
The Swiss Confederacy in the 18th century

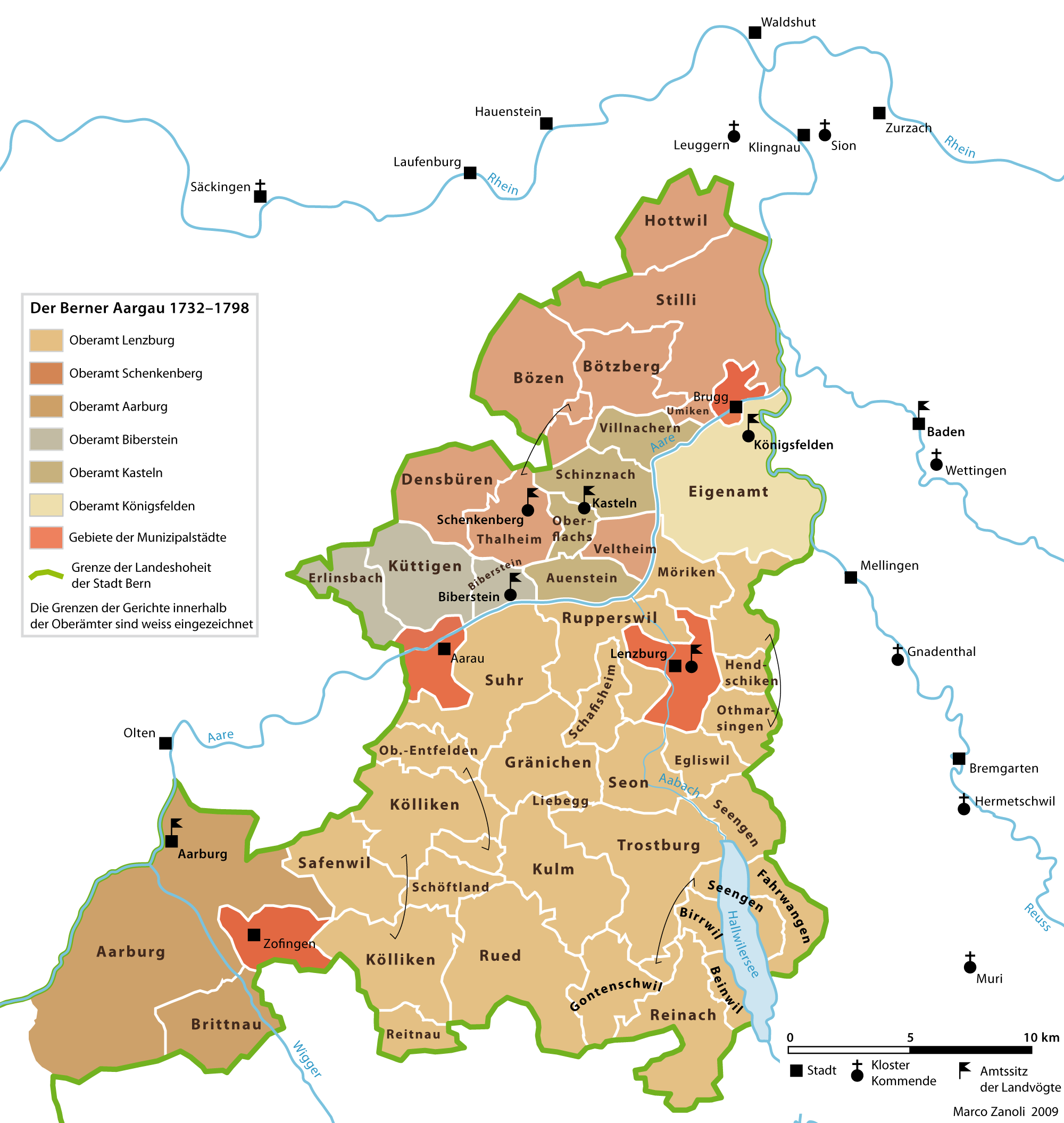
The districts of the Bernese Aargau before the creation of the Canton of Aargau

Districts of the Canton of Bern in the 18th century

Bern joined the Old Swiss Confederation in 1353.

==== 14th century ====
In 1310 Emperor Henry VII pledged Laupen Castle, Laupen and the surrounding lands as collateral for a loan. In 1324, Bern acquired the pledged castle and lands. When the Emperor was unable to repay the loan, Laupen became the first bailiwick of Bern.

In 1322, the brothers Eberhard II of Neu-Kyburg and Hartmann II of Neu-Kyburg started fighting with each other over who would inherit the family's lands around Thun. The fighting led to the "fratricide at Thun Castle" where Eberhard killed his brother Hartmann. To avoid punishment by his Habsburg overlords, Eberhard fled to Bern. In the following year, he sold the town of Thun, its castle and the land surrounding Thun to Bern. Bern then granted the land back to Eberhard as a fief. Bern's support of Eberhard, their resulting expansion into the Oberland and their alliance with the Forest Cantons brought the city into conflict with the Habsburgs during the 14th century. The Gümmenenkrieg in 1333 between Bern and Fribourg over rights and influence in the Sense/Singine area ended without resolving anything.

In 1334, Bern fought with the Barons of Weissenburg and occupied Wimmis and Unspunnen in the Oberland. Bern's victory allowed them to bring the Oberhasli region, its capital of Meiringen and Weissenburg under their control. Bern's continued expansion was at the expense of the feudal lords in the surrounding lands. In 1339 the Habsburgs, Kyburgs and Fribourg, marched against Bern with 17,000 men and besieged the border town of Laupen. To raise the siege, Bern raised a force of 6,000, consisting of Bernese, supported by the Forest Cantons, and other allies (Simmental, Weissenbur and Oberhasli). The allied Bernese forces were victorious at the Battle of Laupen and Bern drew closer to the Swiss Forest Cantons. It entered into a permanent or eternal alliance with Uri, Schwyz and Unterwalden in 1353. This date is usually considered the date of Bern's entrance into the Swiss Confederation; however, the alliance only indirectly tied Bern to Zürich and Lucerne.

In 1358 the cash-strapped Count Peter II of Aarberg pawned the County of Aarberg to Bern. However, in 1367 he sold it, without repaying Bern, to his cousin Rudolf IV of Nidau. After Rudolf's death (1375) Bern acquired clear right to the Aarberg lands from the other heirs.

Throughout the 14th century, Bern entered into alliances and treaties with many of its neighbors, including members of the Swiss Confederation. Bern entered into a series of agreements with Biel/Bienne, which led to a conflict with Biel's ruler, Jean de Vienne, the Prince-Bishop of Basel, in 1367–68. The bishop marched south and destroyed Biel along with a number of towns in the southern Jura Mountains. During the Gugler war in 1375, there were several battles between Bernese troops and English mercenaries under Enguerrand de Coucy.

By the 1370s, the Kyburgs (which still held Thun as a fief for Bern) were deeply in debt to Bern. On 11 November 1382, Rudolf II of Neu-Kyburg made an unsuccessful raid on Solothurn. The ensuing conflict with the Old Swiss Confederacy (known as the Burgdorferkrieg or Kyburgerkrieg) allowed Bern to move against the Habsburgs in Aargau. After the Bernese laid siege to Burgdorf, Neu-Kyburg was forced to concede an unfavourable peace. Bern bought Thun and Burgdorf, the most important cities of Neu-Kyburg, and their remaining towns passed to Bern and Solothurn by 1408. The last of the Neu-Kyburgs, Berchtold, died destitute in Bern in 1417.

In 1386, the Austrians under Leopold of Habsburg invaded eastern Switzerland. When they besieged the city of Sempach, troops from Zürich, Lucerne and the Forest Cantons marched out and defeated the Austrians at the Battle of Sempach. While Bern was not involved at Sempach they took advantage of the Austrian weakness to march into the Oberland in 1386, followed by the Seeland (the region south of the Jura Mountains containing the Morat (Murten), Neuchâtel and Bienne (Biel) lakes) in 1388 and the Aargau in 1389. In the peace agreement of 1389 Bern got Unterseen and the Upper Simme valley (Simmental) from the Habsburgs. In the same year, Fribourg accepted Berns acquisition of the Iselgaus, i.e. the area between Lake Biel and the Seeland. Over the next several decades Bern continued to expand to the detriment of the Habsburgs and Fribourg. They acquired the following towns: 1391 Simmenegg, 1399 Signau, 1400 Frutigen, 1407 Wangen, 1408 Trachselwald and Huttwil, 1412 Oltigen and in 1413 (together with Solothurn) Bipp and Bechburg.

==== 15th century ====
By 1400, Bern controlled the entire Bernese Oberland. Under their control, the five valleys of the Oberland enjoyed extensive rights and far-reaching autonomy in the Bäuerten (farming cooperative municipalities) and Talverbänden (rural alpine communities). However, throughout the Late Middle Ages, the Oberland, as a whole or in part, revolted several times against Bernese authority. The Evil League (Böser Bund) in 1445 fought against Bernese military service and taxes following the Old Zürich War, in 1528 the Oberland rose up in resistance to the Protestant Reformation and in 1641 Thun revolted.

In the Bernese Oberland during the 13th and the beginning of the 14th century Interlaken Monastery grew to become the largest landholder in the region. The Monastery controlled the towns of Grindelwald, Lauterbrunnen and numerous farms along Lake Brienz. However, in 1350 a period of crises and conflicts led to a decline in the number of monks and nuns and increasing debt. In 1348, the people of Grindelwald and Wilderswil joined a mutual defense league with Unterwalden. Bern responded with a military expedition to the Bernese Oberland, which ended in defeat for Unterwalden and its allies. By 1472, Bern was the patron of the Monastery. During the Protestant Reformation, the Monastery was secularized in 1528. The canons received a financial settlement and the properties were now managed by a Bernese bailiff. The tenants of the Monastery who had expected the abolition of all owed debts, responded by rioting, which was suppressed by Bern.

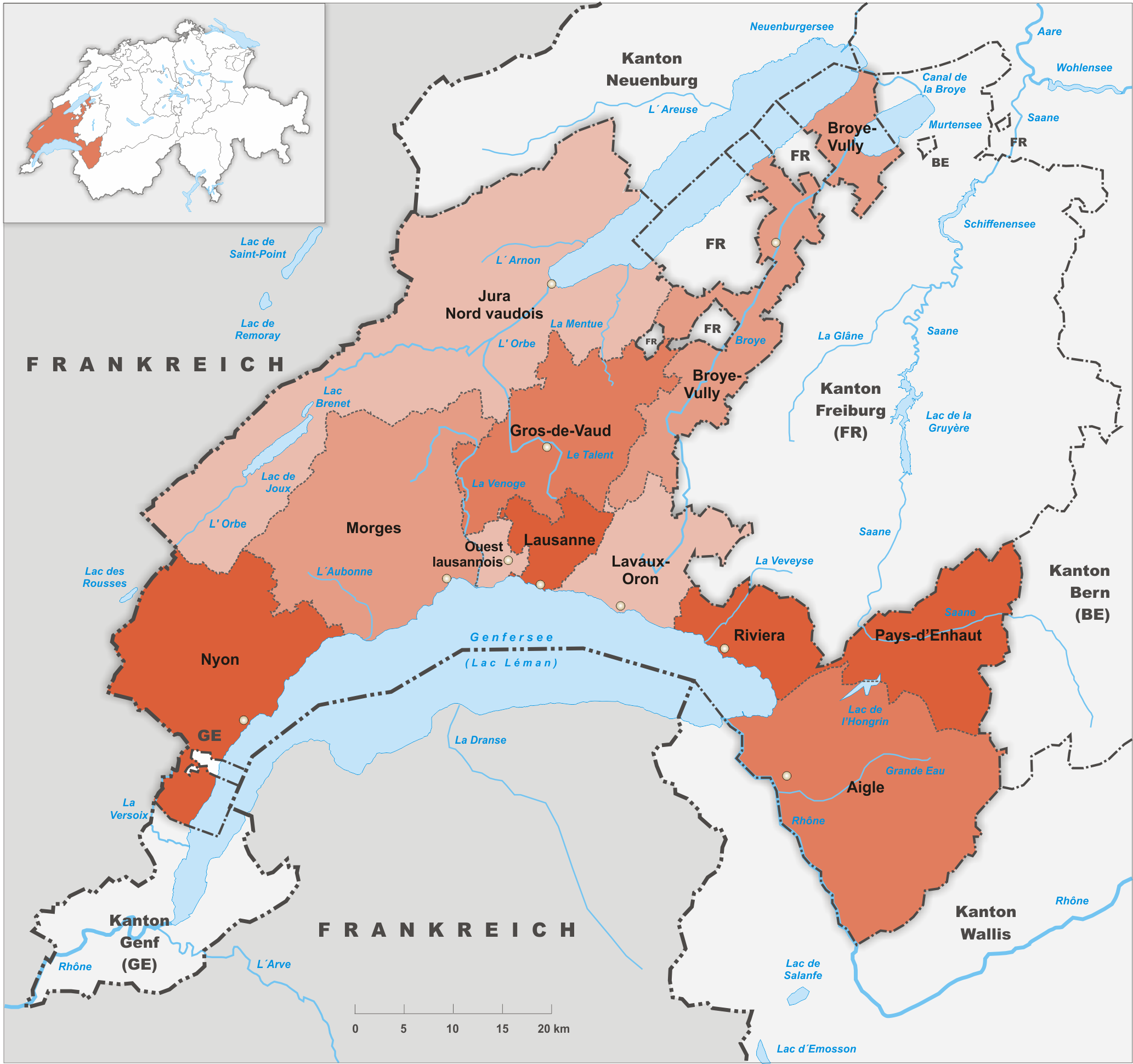
Map of the modern Canton of Vaud, which was annexed by Bern from 1536 until 1798

The lands around the northern shore of Lake Geneva and between Lake Neuchâtel were the next area into which Bern expanded. The region had originally been part of the Carolingian Empire. Then, in 1032 the Zähringens of Germany defeated the Burgundians, who were then replaced by the counts of Savoy in 1218. Under the counts of Savoy the area was given political unity, and established as the Barony of Vaud. However, as the power of the Savoys declined at the beginning of the 15th century the land was occupied by troops from Bern. By 1536 the area was completely annexed. Reformation was started by co-workers of John Calvin, including Viret, who engaged in a famous debate at the cathedral of Lausanne; but it was only decisively implemented when Bern put its full force behind it. Vaud was another French-speaking region in the mostly German-speaking canton, which caused several uprisings.

Both Château-d'Œx and Saanen were part of the county of Gruyère. Both districts had quite a bit of independence and often entered into treaties against the will and best interests of the Counts. In 1340 the Saanen valley concluded a peace treaty with the Simmental, which provided for arbitration in disputes. They entered into another treaty in 1393 with the Valais. In 1401, Count Rudolph of Gruyère entered into a treaty with Bern which included Saanen. Two years later Saanen and Château-d'Œx negotiated their own alliances with Bern. Due to the Bernese alliance, Saanen sent troops, under their own banner, to support the Bernese invasions of Aargau in 1415 and Valais in 1418. The military losses and taxes following the Old Zürich War led Saanen to support the Evil League (Böser Bund) in 1445 against Bern.

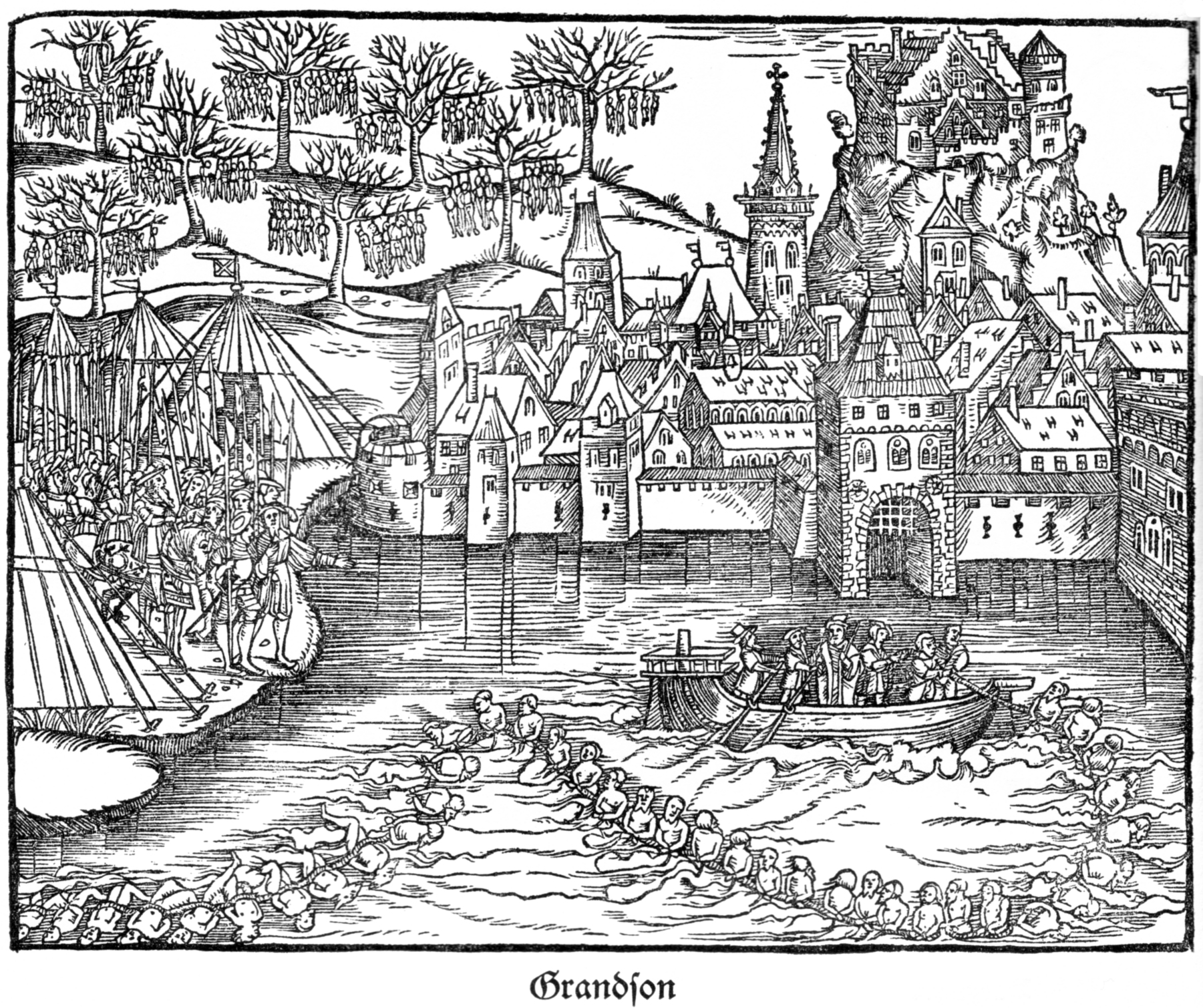
Siege and execution of the garrison at Grandson

In 1475, during the Burgundian Wars, the mountain regions of Saanen and Pays-d'Enhaut, who were allied with Bern, attacked and burned the tower of Aigle Castle. They then gave Aigle town and the surrounding district to Bern in exchange for not having to pay one-third of their income to Bern. In the treaty of Fribourg from 1476, Fribourg received rights over the Aigle district, which they gave up to Bern in 1483. Bern rebuilt Aigle Castle in 1489 and made it the seat of the bailiwick of Aigle. Also in 1475, the Confederation attacked and captured Grandson Castle. In the next year, Charles the Bold retook the castle and executed the Bernese garrison. In 1476, at the Battle of Grandson, Charles' forces retreated and the Bernese retook Grandson. After Charles' defeat at the Battle of Murten, Grandson became a shared territory between Bern and Fribourg. Each city appointed a vogt for five-year periods. Aigle and Grandson were the first French speaking regions in the Canton of Bern.

During the Burgundian War in 1475, Saanen, together with troops from Château-d'Œx and the Simmental captured the Savoy district of Aigle for Bern. Saanen and the surrounding district enjoyed a great deal of independence during the 16th century. However, in 1555 the last Count of Gruyère lost both districts to Bern when his county went bankrupt. Bern took over the entire Saanen valley in the following year and introduced the Protestant Reformation. They incorporated the Pays-d'Enhaut with Château-d'Œx into the new Bernese district of Saanen.

==== Acquired districts ====
The area of the canton of Bern consists of lands acquired by the city of Bern mostly between the 14th and the 16th century during the original Swiss Confederacy period, both by conquest and purchase.
Acquired districts, with dates of acquisition, include:

- Laupen (1324)
- Oberhasli (1334)
- Aarberg (1375)
- Thun and Burgdorf (1384)
- Unterseen and the Upper Simme valley (1386)
- Frutigen and other towns in the Bernese Oberland (1400)
- Aargau (1415)
- Lower Simme valley (1439–1449)
- Aigle and Grandson (1475)
- Interlaken, with Grindelwald, Lauterbrunnen and Brienz (1528, all the suppression of the Augustinian Canons at Interlaken Monastery)
- Vaud (1536)
- Saanen or Gessenay (1555)
- the Pays d'En-Haut including Château-d'Œx (1555)
- Köniz (1729).

=== Social changes in Early Modern Bern ===
In the Middle Ages, upwards mobility and access to public offices was relatively easy for successful traders and craftsmen, but Bernese society became ever more stratified and aristocratic as the power and wealth of the city grew.

By the 17th century in the Early Modern period, citizenship had become an inherited prerogative, all political bodies elected one another and officials were elected for life. In effect, public offices were now the exclusive prerogative of the gnädige Herren, the "merciful lords", as the small number of noble families now ruling Bern came to be called. In 1605 there were 152 families that were qualified to rule, by 1691 that number was only 104, while towards the end of the 18th century there were only 69 such families. Meanwhile, the land ruled by the town was extending over more and more territory, so that finally it governed 52 bailiwicks. These offices became very lucrative as the Bernese territories grew. Patrician Landvögte, sheriffs, ruled the politically powerless countryside, often using armed force to put down peasant revolts.

In Vaud the Bernese occupation was not popular amongst the population. In 1723, Major Abraham Davel led a revolt against Bern, in protest at what he saw as the denial of political rights of the French-speaking Vaudois by the German-speaking Bernese, and was subsequently beheaded.

=== Napoleonic period ===
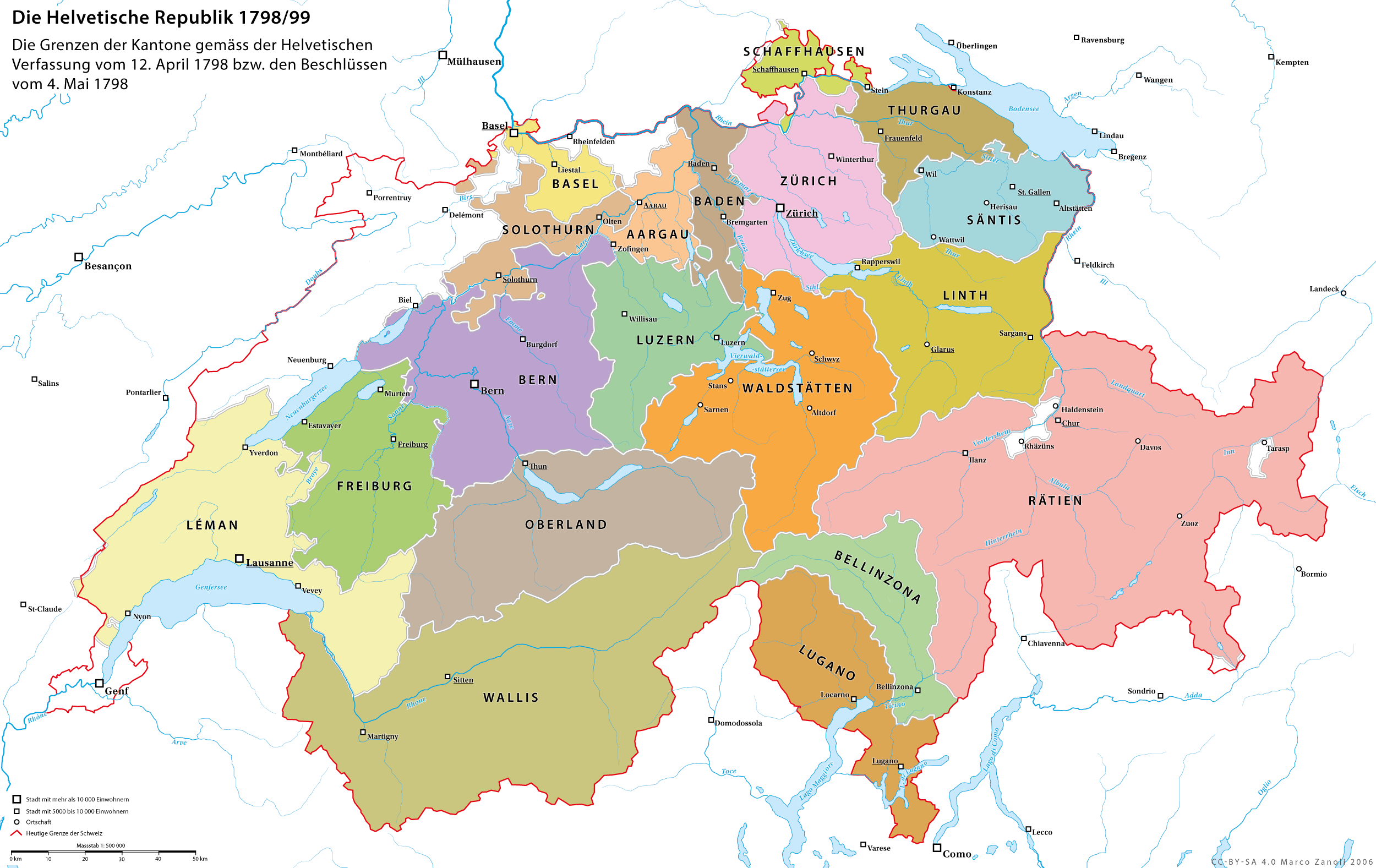
The Helvetic Republic from 1798 to 1801

Inspired by the French Revolution, the Vaudois drove out the Bernese governor in 1798 and declared the Lemanic Republic. Vaud nationalists like Frédéric-César de La Harpe had called for French intervention in liberating the area and French Revolutionary troops moved in, taking over the whole of Switzerland itself in the process and setting up the Helvetic Republic.

In 1798, with the establishment of the Helvetic Republic, Bern was divided, the canton of Oberland with Thun as its capital and the canton of Léman with Lausanne as its capital were detached from what was left of the Canton of Bern.

Within the new canton of Oberland, historic borders and traditional rights were not considered. As there had been no previous separatist feeling amongst the conservative population, there was little enthusiasm for the new order. The situation in the canton of Léman was quite different. The French-speaking Vaudois had never felt like part of the German-speaking Canton of Bern. When they joined the Swiss Confederation in 1803, it was as the Canton of Vaud.

Under the Helvetic Republic, Pays-d'Enhaut with Château-d'Œx became part of the Canton of Léman while Saanen and the rest of the district became part of the Canton of Oberland. When the Helvetic Republic collapsed in 1803, Saanen and its district became a district in the new Canton of Bern while Château-d'Oex and its district joined Vaud.

The 1801 Malmaison Constitution proposed reuniting the Oberland with Bern, but it was not until the Act of Mediation, two years later, with the abolition of the Helvetic Republic and the partial restoration of the ancien régime, that the two cantons were reunited.

Between 1803 and 1814 Bern was one of the six directorial cantons of the Napoleonic Swiss Confederation.

=== Modern history ===
With the post−Napoleonic Restoration of 1815, Bern acquired the Bernese Jura with Biel/Bienne from the bishopric of Basel, while the canton of Léman became the canton of Vaud and remained separate from Bern.

Bern still remained the largest canton of the confederacy from 1815 to 1979, when parts of the Bernese Jura broke away to form the canton of Jura. In 1994 the Laufen District was transferred to the canton of Basel-Landschaft.

== Geography ==
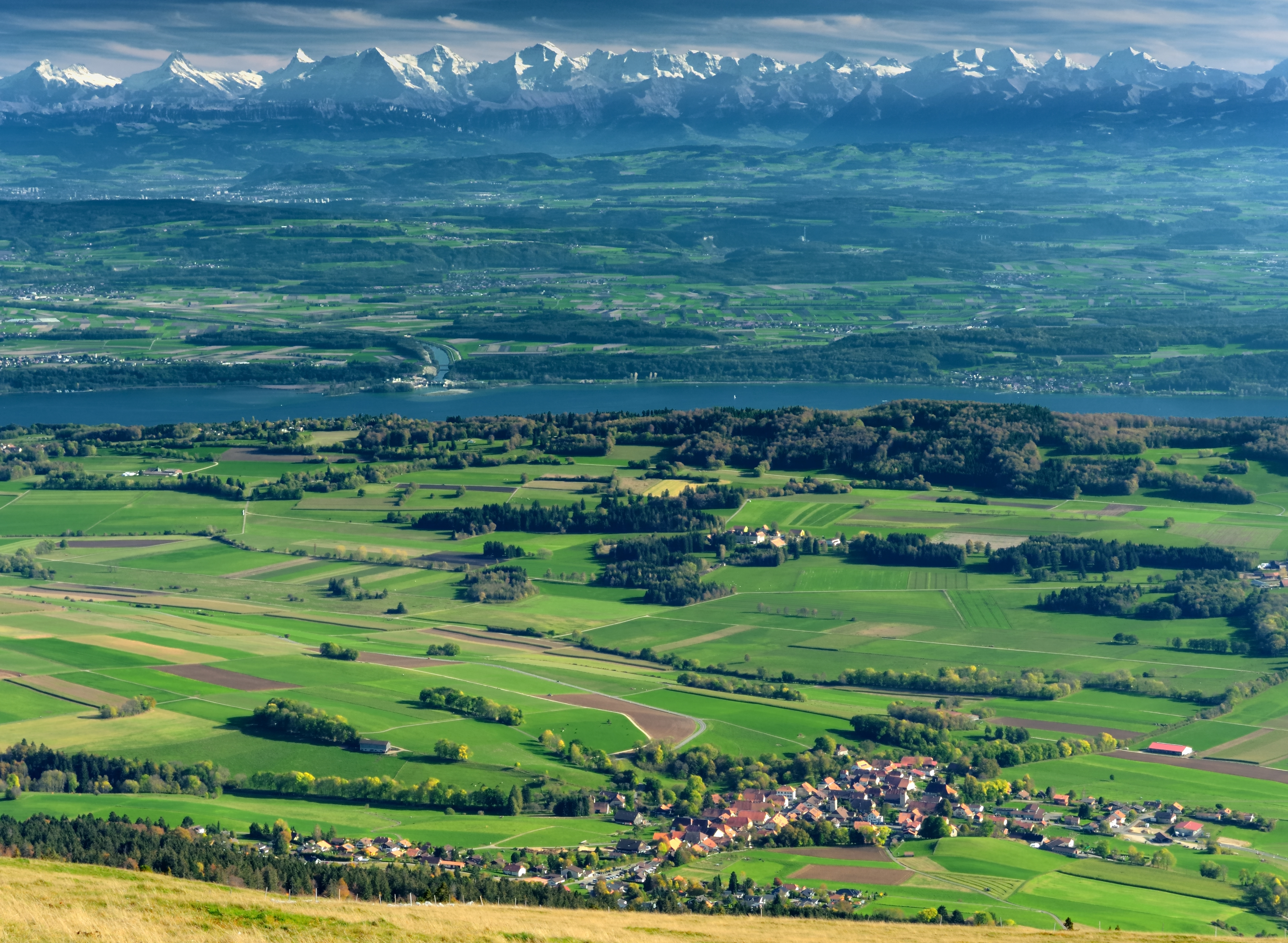
View from the Chasseral across the Mittelland to the Bernese Alps

The canton of Bern is mainly drained by the river Aare and its tributaries. The area of the canton is commonly divided into six regions. The most populated area is the Bernese Mittelland on the plateau north of the Alps, with the capital city of Bern. The northmost part of the canton is the Bernese Jura bordering the Canton of Jura. The Bernese Oberland is the mountainous region which lies in the south of the canton.

The area of the canton is 5,959 km^{2} (2,301 mi^{2}). Of this area, 6.9% is occupied with houses, businesses or roads. 42.6% of the canton is agricultural land, and 31.3% is forested. Less than 19.2% is considered non-productive, which includes glaciers, cliffs and lakes.

=== Bernese Mittelland ===
The Bernese Mittelland (Bernese Midlands) is made up of the valley of the rivers Aare, the (Grosse) Emme, some of the foothills of the Bernese Alps, as well as the plain around the capital Bern, and has many small farms and hilly forested regions with small to mid-sized towns scattered throughout. It is perhaps best known by foreigners and visitors for the Emmental. The classic Swiss cheese with holes Emmentaler comes from this region's forests and pastures, of hilly and low mountainous countryside in the 1,000 to 2,000 m (3,300 to 6,600 ft) range.

=== Three Lakes Region and Bernese Jura ===
In the north of the canton lies the predominantly French-speaking Three Lakes Region (Seeland), concentrated around Lake Biel, Neuchâtel, and Murten, which rises from the plain up to the northernmost Swiss mountain chain of the Jura. This area, culminating at the Chasseral, has more relaxed geography, although still some lower mountains and some waterfalls, and large lakes.

=== Bernese Oberland ===
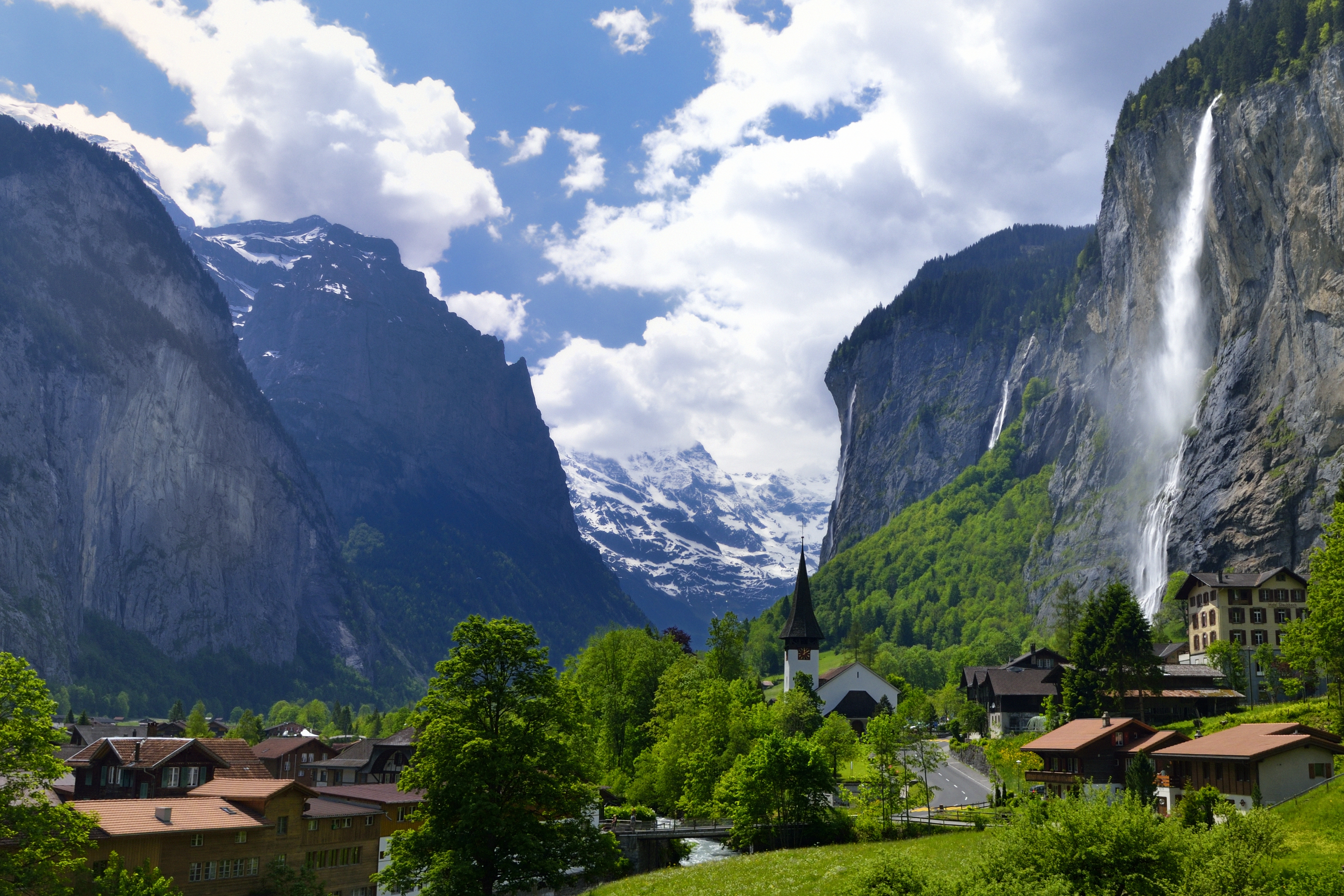
Staubbachfall

The Bernese Oberland (German: Berner Oberland) constitute the north side of the Bernese Alps and the west side of the Urner Alps within the canton of Bern. The highest mountain in the Bernese Alps is the Finsteraarhorn at 4,274 m (14,022 ft), but the best known mountains are Eiger, Mönch, and Jungfrau.

The well known hiking and ski resorts in the eastern Oberland are located around Interlaken and the Jungfrau, such as car-free Mürren and Wengen in the Lauterbrunnen valley, and Grindelwald. Further east, in the Haslital are the Aareschlucht and the town of Meiringen, famous for the fateful scene of Sherlock Holmes's 'death' at the hands of Professor Moriarty on the nearby Reichenbach Falls. In the Western Bernese Oberland there are many other resorts and small villages catering to visitors. These are accessed from the lake town of Thun, and the most notable of them are Kandersteg with the Oeschinensee and Adelboden. Further west is the Simmental with Lenk and Zweisimmen and the Saanenland with the famous resorts Gstaad and Saanen.

The whole area is very mountainous, with steep cliffs, many glaciers, and countless waterfalls. It is renowned for its scenic beauty and the charm of the small Swiss villages that dot the area. As a result of this, tourism is one of the main sources of income in the Bernese Oberland. The region also has an extensive train network as well as many cable cars and funiculars, with the highest train station in Europe at the Jungfraujoch and the longest gondola cableway in the world from Grindelwald to the Männlichen.

Mountains in the Bernese Oberland include:

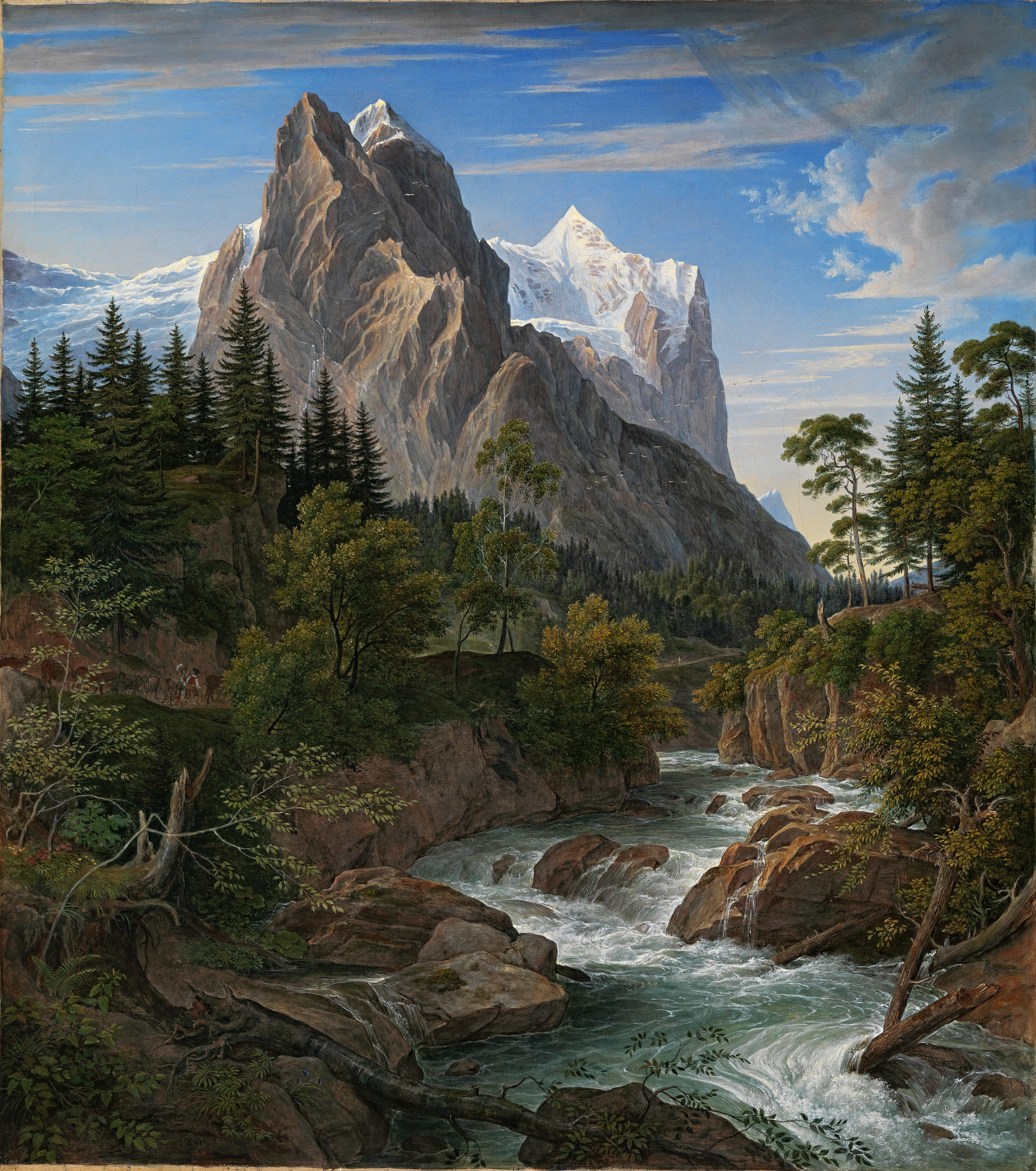
Wetterhorn, painting by Joseph Anton Koch, 1824

- Finsteraarhorn – 4,274 m (14,022 ft)
- Jungfrau – 4,158 m (13,642 ft)
- Mönch – 4,107 m (13,474 ft)
- Schreckhorn – 4,078 m (13,379 ft)
- Eiger – 3,969 m (13,022 ft)
- Wetterhorn – 3,698 m (12,133 ft)
- Blümlisalp – 3,664 m (12,021 ft)
- Sustenhorn – 3,503 m (11,493 ft)
- Wildhorn – 3,248 m (10,656 ft)
- Schilthorn – 2,971 m (9,747 ft)

== Government ==
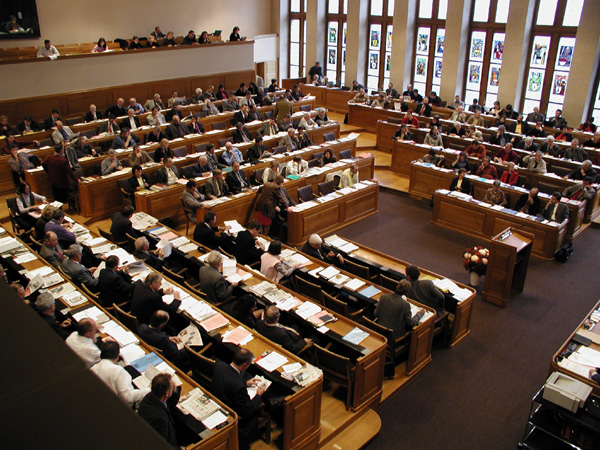
The Grand Council, the cantonal parliament

The Grand Council of Bern (German: Grosser Rat/French: Grand conseil) is the parliament of the canton of Bern. It consists of 160 representatives elected by proportional representation for four-year terms of office. The French-speaking part of the canton, the Bernese Jura, has 12 seats guaranteed and 3 seats are guaranteed for the French-speaking minority of the bilingual district of Biel/Bienne.

The Executive Council of Bern (German: Regierungsrat/French: Conseil-éxecutif) is the government of the canton of Bern. This seven-member collegial body is elected by the people for a period of four years. The cantonal constitution reserves one seat in the Executive Council for a French-speaking citizen from the Bernese Jura.

The canton has a two-tiered court system, consisting of district courts and a cantonal Supreme Court (German: Obergericht, French: Cour suprême). There is also an administrative court (German: Verwaltungsgericht; French: Tribunal administratif) as well as other specialised courts and judicial boards.

== Political subdivisions ==
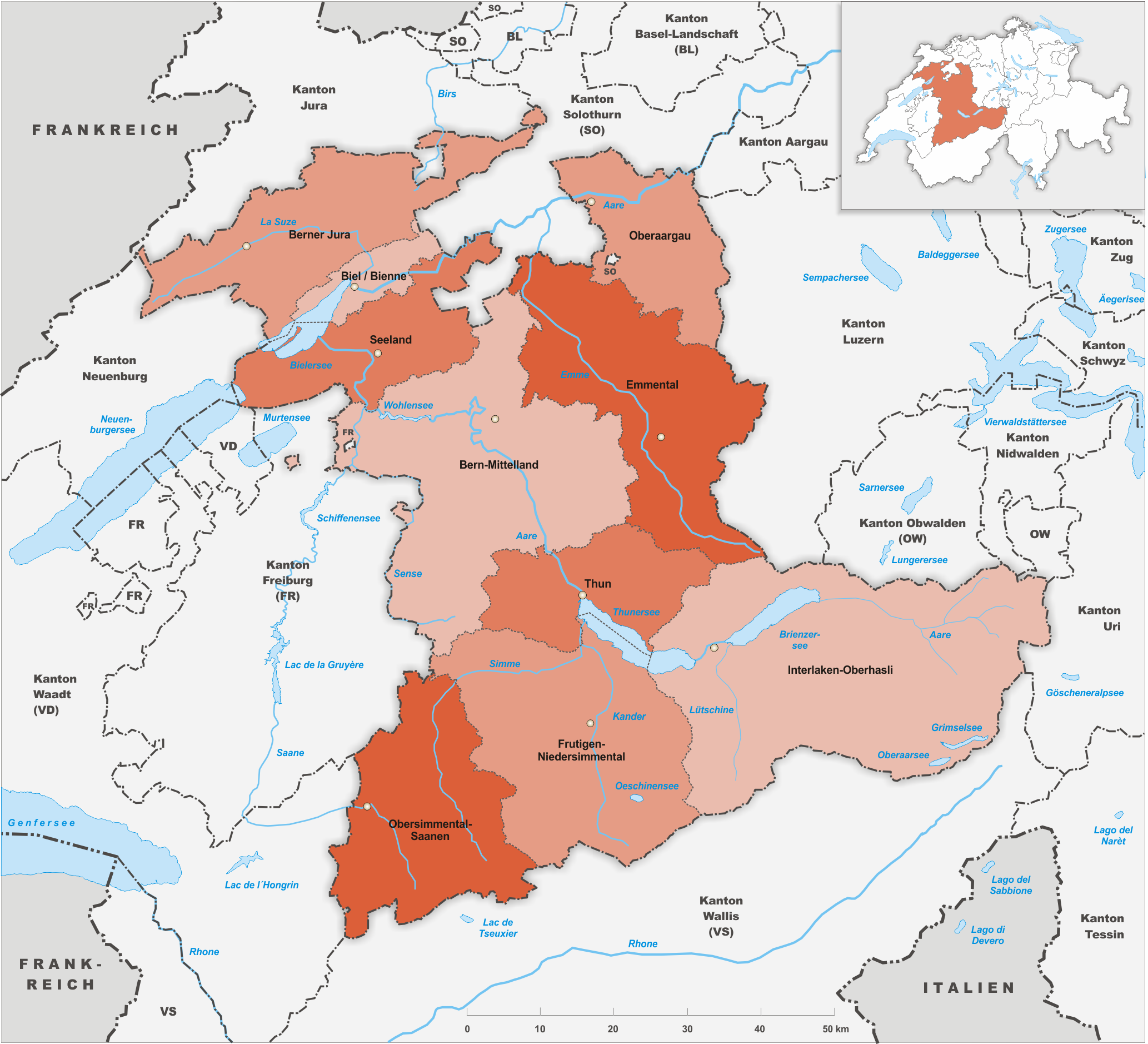
Districts of the canton of Bern

On 1 January 2010, the 26 districts (Amtsbezirke) were combined into 10 new districts (Verwaltungskreise):

- Bern-Mittelland with capital Ostermundigen, made up of all or part of the former districts of Bern, Fraubrunnen, Konolfingen, Laupen, Schwarzenburg and Seftigen
- Biel/Bienne with capital Biel/Bienne, made up of all of the former district of Biel and about half of the former district of Nidau
- Emmental with capital Langnau im Emmental, made up of all or part of the former districts of Burgdorf, Signau and Trachselwald
- Frutigen-Niedersimmental with capital Frutigen, made up of all or part of the former districts of Frutigen and Niedersimmental
- Interlaken-Oberhasli with capital Interlaken, made up of all or part of the former districts of Interlaken and Oberhasli
- Jura bernois with capital Courtelary, made up of all or part of the former districts of Courtelary, Moutier and La Neuveville
- Oberaargau with capital Wangen an der Aare, made up of all or part of the former districts of Aarwangen and Wangen
- Obersimmental-Saanen with capital Saanen, made up of all of the former districts of Obersimmental and Saanen
- Seeland with capital Aarberg, made up of all or part of the former districts of Aarberg, Büren, Erlach and Nidau
- Thun with capital Thun, made up of all of the former district of Thun

== Demographics ==
The canton of Bern is bilingual: (as of 2014) both German (85.1% of the population) and French (10.4%) are spoken. The German-speaking majority speaks Bernese German, a Swiss German dialect. French-speakers live in the western and northern part of the canton, the Bernese Jura. Both German and French are spoken in the bilingual district of Biel/Bienne. In the cantonal government and administration, both languages are official languages of equal standing.

In December 2020, Bern had a population of 1,043,132. In 2014, 15.0% of the population were resident foreign nationals. From 2010 to 2014, the population increased at a rate of 3.0% annually. In 2000, most of the population spoke German (804,190 or 84.0%) as their first language; French was the second most common (72,646 or 7.6%) native language and Italian was the third (18,908 or 2.0%). There were 688 people who speak Romansh. Using different methodology, the 2014 census found that the proportion of German native speakers to be 85.1%, that of French speakers 10.4%, and that 3.1% were Italian speakers. The number of Romansh speakers was too small to accurately estimate, but was around 0.1%. The census also reported that 2.9% of the population spoke English as their native language. Respondents could choose up to three native languages, leading to a total above 100%.

In 2008, the population was 47.5% male and 52.5% female. The population was made up of 44,032 Swiss men (35.4% of the population) and 15,092 (12.1%) non-Swiss men. There were 51,531 Swiss women (41.4%) and 13,726 (11.0%) non-Swiss women. Of the population in the canton, 292,559 or about 30.6% were born in Bern and lived there in 2000. There were 339,659 or 35.5% who were born in the same canton, while 154,709 or 16.2% were born somewhere else in Switzerland, and 129,864 or 13.6% were born outside of Switzerland.

The age distribution of the canton in 2014 was as follows: those from 0–19 years old made up 19.1% of the population, while those aged 20–64 years old were 60.9%, and those 65 and older comprised. The 2000 census had found these groups to represent 22%, 60.9% and 17.1% of the total, respectively.

In 2000, there were 397,095 people who were single and never married in the canton. There were 449,014 married individuals, 61,206 widows or widowers and 49,882 individuals who are divorced.

There were 454,000 private households in the canton in 2014, and an average of 2.2 persons per household. As of 2013, the construction rate of new housing units was 4.4 new units per 1000 residents.

In 2003, the average price to rent an average apartment in Bern city was 1108.92 Swiss francs (CHF) per month (US$890, £500, €710 approx. exchange rate from 2003). The average rate for a one-room apartment was 619.82 CHF (US$500, £280, €400), a two-room apartment was about 879.36 CHF (US$700, £400, €560), a three-room apartment was about 1040.54 CHF (US$830, £470, €670) and a six or more room apartment cost an average of 2094.80 CHF (US$1680, £940, €1340). The average apartment price in Bern was 99.4% of the national average of 1116 CHF. The vacancy rate for the canton, in 2010, was 1.19%.

== Historic population ==
The historical population is given in the following chart:

Historic Population Data
Year	Total Population	German Speaking	French Speaking	Protestant	Catholic	Other	Jewish	Christian Catholic	No religion given	Swiss	Non-Swiss
1850	458,301			403,768	54,045		488				
1860	413,887										
1870	444,430										
1880	471,991										
1888	476,564										
1900	589,433	483,388	97,789	506,699	80,489	970	1,543				
1910	578,381										
1920	607,107										
1930	623,665										
1941	662,683										
1950	801,943	665,702	120,566	671,817	122,971	3,189	1,403	3,256			
1960	813,601										
1970	901,706										
1980	898,397										
1990	958,192	802,740	74,338	691,812	172,906	53,880	802	1,263	41,350	860,655	97,537
2000	957,197										

== Politics ==
In the 2011 federal election, the most popular party was the SVP which received 29.0% of the vote. The next three most popular parties were the SP/PS (19.3%), the BDP (14.9%) and the Green Party (9.4%). The SVP received about the same percentage of the vote as they did in the 2007 Federal election (33.6% in 2007 vs 29.0% in 2011). The SPS retained about the same popularity (21.2% in 2007), the BDP moved from below fourth place in 2007 to third and the GPS moved from below fourth place in 2007 to fourth.

=== Federal election results ===
Percentage of the total vote per party in the canton in the federal elections, 1971–2019
Party	Ideology	1971	1975	1979	1983	1987	1991	1995	1999	2003	2007	2011	2015	2019
FDP.The Liberals^{a}	Classical liberalism	17.3	17.6	18.0	15.1	16.1	13.7	15.6	17.2	14.8	15.1	8.7	9.3	8.4
CVP/PDC/PPD/PCD	Christian democracy	5.3	5.3	2.5	2.1	2.4	2.6	1.9	2.4	2.3	4.7	2.1	1.8	1.9
SP/PS	Social democracy	31.0	31.0	30.5	28.3	22.3	20.0	24.7	27.6	27.9	21.2	19.3	19.7	16.8
SVP/UDC	National conservatism	29.2	27.1	31.5	29.0	27.8	26.3	26.0	28.6	29.6	33.6	29.0	33.1	30.0
LPS/PLS	Classical liberalism	*^{b}	*	*	*	*	*	0.3	*	*	*	*	*	*
Ring of Independents	Social liberalism	6.3	4.7	3.1	3.2	3.6	2.9	1.9	0.8	*	*	*	*	*
EVP/PEV	Christian democracy	4.1	3.5	3.4	3.3	3.4	3.3	3.8	4.0	5.2	5.4	4.2	4.3	4.2
CSP/PCS	Christian socialism	0.9	0.9	*	*	*	*	*	*	*	*	*	*	*
GLP/PVL	Green liberalism	*	*	*	*	*	*	*	*	*	*	5.3	6.0	9.7
BDP/PBD	Conservatism	*	*	*	*	*	*	*	*	*	*	14.9	11.8	8.0
PdA/PST-POP/PC/PSL	Socialism	*	0.6	0.3	*	*	0.2	*	*	*	*	0.3	0.5	0.6
PSA	Socialism	*	*	^{c}	^{c}	*	*	*	*	*	*	*	*	*
POCH	Communism	*	0.5	1.4	1.6	^{d}	^{e}	*	*	*	*	*	*	*
GPS/PES	Green politics	*	*	*	*	9.2	9.9	5.9	7.5	9.3	12.9	9.4	8.5	13.6
FGA	Feminism	*	*	1.1	2.2	2.6	2.0	2.5	^{f}	*	*	*	*	*
SD/DS	National conservatism	3.7	3.4	3.6	6.0	3.2	6.0	5.5	3.7	2.7	1.5	0.6	0.4	0.4
EDU/UDF	Christian right	*	1.1	1.2	1.8	2.7	3.4	4.2	4.0	4.1	3.6	3.1	2.8	2.5
FPS/PSL	Right-wing populism	*	*	*	*	3.2	6.8	5.9	2.7	1.1	0.6	*	*	*
Separatist parties		*	1.8	2.8	2.2	1.0	1.7	1.5	*	1.9	*	*	*	*
Other		0.0	0.2	0.6	5.2	2.6	1.2	0.5	1.6	1.1	1.3	3.2	1.7	3.9
Voter participation %		58.0	54.3	49.8	49.9	45.7	46.2	40.4	41.1	42.1	46.4	50.4	49.1	47.3

^a FDP before 2009, FDP.The Liberals after 2009
^b "*" indicates that the party was not on the ballot in this canton.
^c Part of a coalition with Separatist Party
^d Part of a coalition with the FGA
^e Party fragmented, part remained in a coalition with the FGA and the remainder formed the Green Party of Bern
^f Part of a coalition with the Green Party

== Coat of arms ==
The blazon of the coat of arms is Gules, on a bend or, a bear passant sable, langued, armed and vilené of the field. The official blazon specifies that the tongue, claws and penis are red—and by extension it is important to always depict the bear as male.

== Religion ==
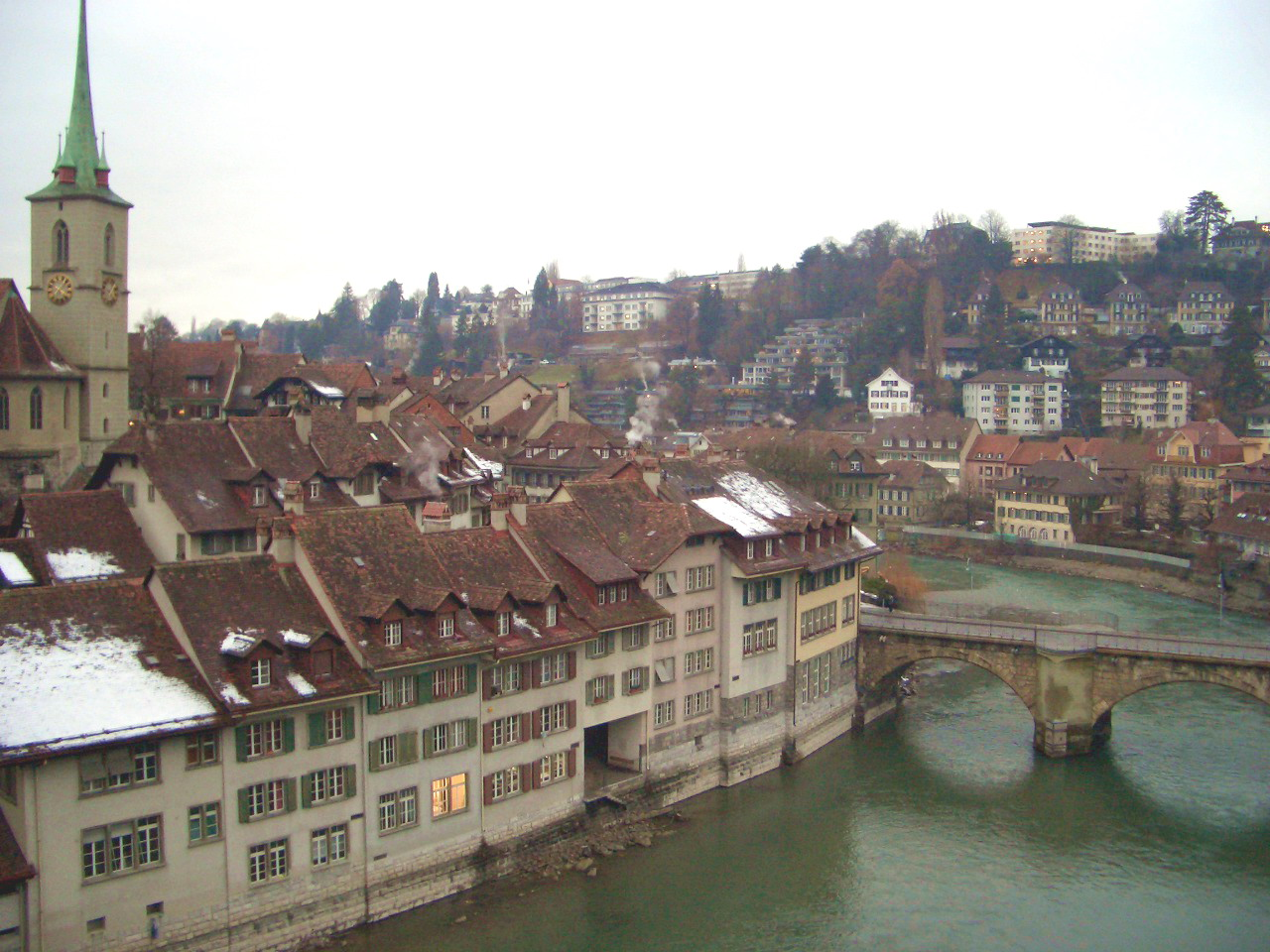
Capital city of Bern with the Aare, Gothic Nydeggkirche on left

Most Bernese are Protestant (as of 2000, 67%), and most Protestants belong to the Swiss Reformed Church, which is officially recognised as a state church (German: Landeskirche), although it is autonomous in its governance and is organised along democratic principles. The canton is also home to a great number of small Evangelical Christian denominations unaffiliated with the state church. Bernese evangelical groups are mostly found in the Emmental and Berner Oberland, where they have a long tradition; several contemporary North American religious groups, such as the Amish and Mennonites, were founded or co-founded by Bernese emigrants to the United States. Two small Evangelical political parties are represented in the Bernese cantonal parliament.

Bern features substantial Roman Catholic (16%) and Christian Catholic minorities. These churches also have state church status, and the small Jewish community is similarly recognised by law. As everywhere in Switzerland, there are also significant religious communities of immigrants, including Sikhs (who have a prominent Gurdwara, or temple, in Langenthal), The Church of Jesus Christ of Latter-day Saints (who have built the Bern Switzerland Temple) and Muslims. As of 2006, the plans to expand a backyard mosque in Langenthal with a symbolic minaret have, as elsewhere in Switzerland, caused a public stir due to vocal opposition from local conservative and evangelical leaders.

From the 2000 census, 607,358 or 63.5% belonged to the Swiss Reformed Church, while 153,357 or 16.0% were Roman Catholic. Of the rest of the population, there were 9,153 members of an Orthodox church (or about 0.96% of the population), there were 1,064 individuals (or about 0.11% of the population) who belonged to the Christian Catholic Church, and there were 71,233 individuals (or about 7.44% of the population) who belonged to another Christian church. There were 807 individuals (or about 0.08% of the population) who were Jewish, and 28,377 (or about 2.96% of the population) who were Muslims. There were 2,662 individuals who were Buddhist, 5,991 individuals who were Hindu and 913 individuals who belonged to another church. 74,162 (or about 7.75% of the population) belonged to no church, are agnostic or atheist, and 37,059 individuals (or about 3.87% of the population) did not answer the question.

== Economy ==
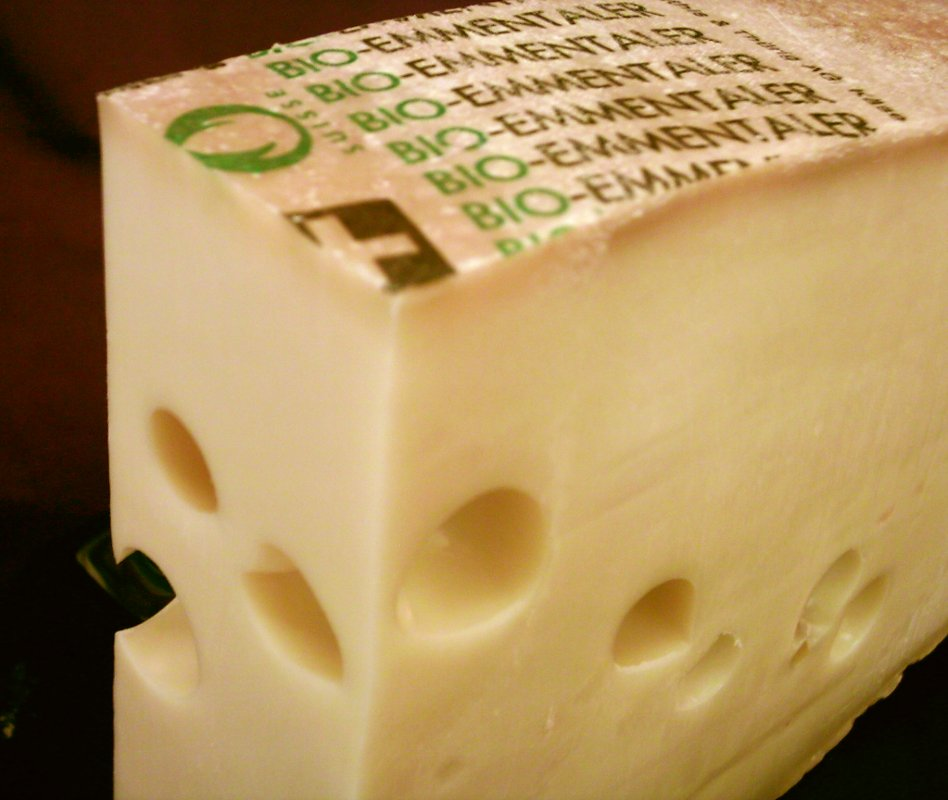
Emmentaler cheese

Tourism is the main source of income in the Bernese Oberland. Other important sectors are agriculture (especially cattle breeding), cheese making, and hydroelectric power generation. The Bernese cheese Emmentaler is known around the world. In the Bernese Midlands the lands are more fertile. Agriculture is of great importance, but this part of the canton is also the most industrialized. Small and middle-sized businesses are important employers in this part of the canton of Bern. There is a nuclear power plant at Mühleberg; however, it is no longer operational.

The area around Lake Biel is renowned for its wine production. The 3 French-speaking districts of the Bernese Jura and the bilingual district of Biel/Bienne are renowned for their watch industry and its mechanical industry (high precision machine tools, automation and machining).

As of 2015, Bern had an unemployment rate of 2.58%, compared to the Swiss national average of 3.3%. As of 2013, there were 34,200 people employed in the primary economic sector and about 11,563 businesses involved in this sector. About 132,800 people were employed in the secondary sector and there were 11,925 businesses in this sector. Approximately 453,800 people were employed in the tertiary sector, with 55,347 businesses in this sector. Of the working population, 31.0% used public transportation to get to work, and 51.0% used a private car.

== Education ==
In Bern about 385,640 or (40.3%) of the population have completed non-mandatory upper secondary education, and 121,749 or (12.7%) have completed additional higher education (either university or a Fachhochschule). Of the 121,749 who completed tertiary schooling, 65.0% were Swiss men, 24.8% were Swiss women, 6.2% were non-Swiss men and 4.0% were non-Swiss women.

== Transport ==
Regional rail within the canton is provided mainly by Bern S-Bahn (partly also by Lucerne S-Bahn). The larger railway stations (e.g. Bern, Biel/Bienne, Interlaken Ost, Spiez, Thun) are also served by long-distance EuroCity, Intercity-Express, InterCity and/or InterRegio trains. Additionally, PostAuto and several other bus operators serve towns and villages within the canton. Rail and bus services operate within the Libero Tariff Network.

Several cable cars and funiculars provide access to mountains.

The canton is served by Belp Airport; however, Zurich Airport and Geneva Airport provide most domestic and international flights.

The canton is traversed by the following motorways: A1, A5, A6, A8, A12, and A16.

== See also ==
- Municipalities of the canton of Bern
- Canton of Bern castles and fortresses
- List of mountains of the canton of Bern
- Berner Zeitung
- Bernese March
- Bieler Tagblatt
- Der Bund
