= Limpach, Switzerland =

Limpach
- Former municipality
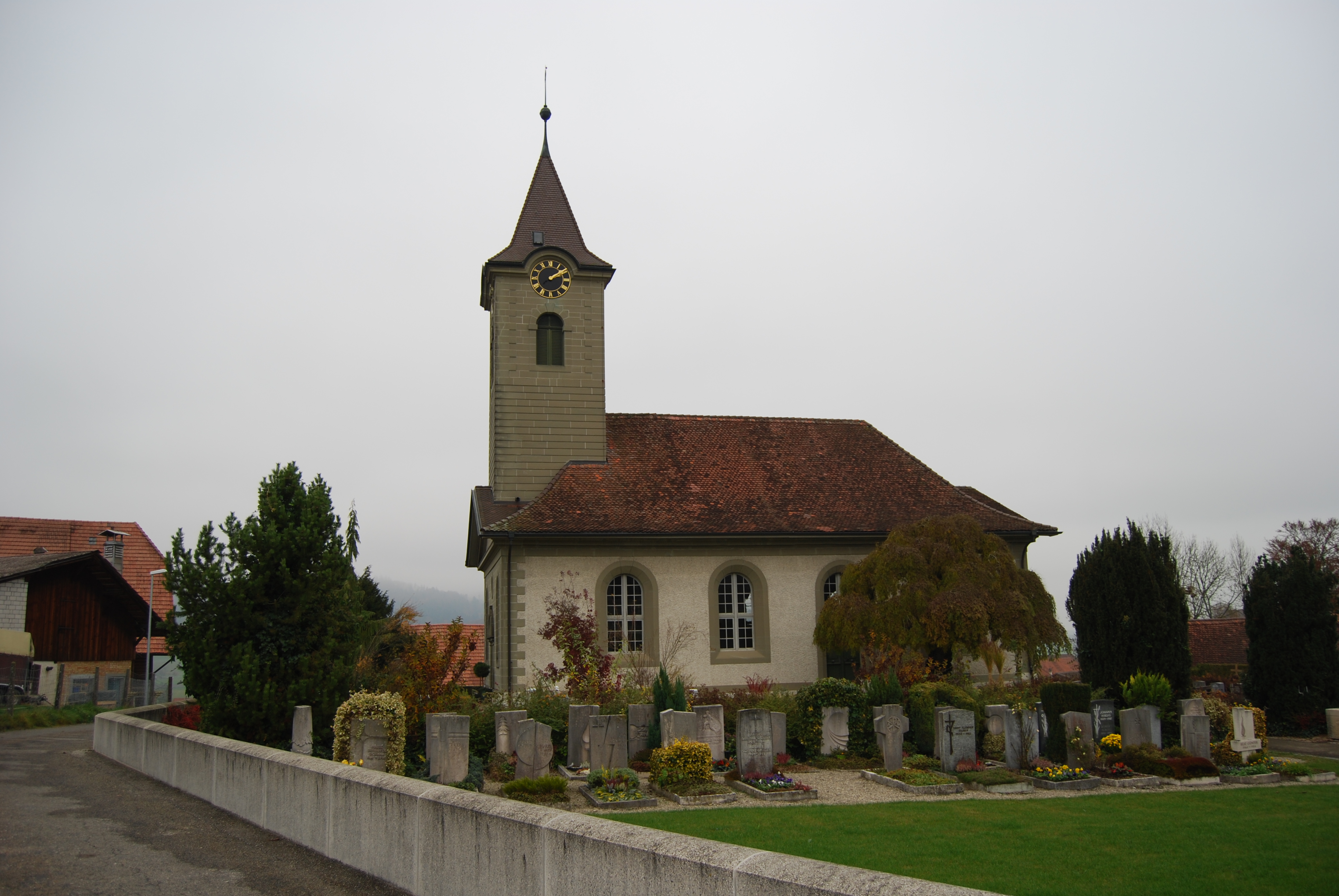
- Limpach village Swiss Reformed church

- Flag Coat of arms
- Location of Limpach
- Location within Switzerland Location within Canton of Bern
- Coordinates: 47°7′N 7°30′E
- Country: Switzerland
- Canton: Bern
- District: Bern-Mittelland

Area
  - Total: 4.4 km^{2} (1.7 sq mi)
- Elevation: 473 m (1,552 ft)

Population (Dec 2011)
  - Total: 354
  - Density: 80/km^{2} (210/sq mi)
- Time zone: UTC+01:00 (CET)
  - Summer (DST): UTC+02:00 (CEST)
- Postal code: 3317
- SFOS number: 542
- ISO 3166 code: CH-BE
- Surrounded by: Aetingen (SO), Bätterkinden, Büren zum Hof, Fraubrunnen, Mülchi, Schalunen, Unterramsern (SO)
- Website: www.limpach.ch

Limpach (German pronunciation: [ˈlɪmpax]) is a former municipality in the Bern-Mittelland administrative district in the canton of Bern in Switzerland. On 1 January 2014 the former municipalities of Limpach, Büren zum Hof, Etzelkofen, Grafenried, Mülchi, Schalunen and Zauggenried merged into the municipality of Fraubrunnen.

== History ==
Limpach is first mentioned in 1276 as Limpach.

Several prehistoric grave mounds have been discovered at In Ischlag. During the 13th century the village and the low court right were both owned by Fraubrunnen Abbey. After Bern accepted the Protestant Reformation in 1528 and secularized the Abbey and its lands, the village came under Bernese control. It was placed under the bailiwick of Fraubrunnen. The high court over the village was originally part of the Counts of Kyburg's Burgundian territories. In 1406 Bern acquired the Kyburg lands and placed the village under the high court in Zollikofen. The village was rebuilt after a fire in 1836.

The village church was first mentioned in 1276. It was replaced in 1808 by a new building. The patronage rights to the church were originally held by the Ministerialis (unfree knights in the service of a feudal overlord) family of Senn von Münsingen who sold it to the Solothurn Schilling family in 1390. The Schillings traded it to the hospital in Solothurn in 1431. In 1539, after the village accepted the Protestant Reformation, the patronage rights were traded to Bern.

The Limpach river valley near Limpach has always been marshy. The first attempt to drain the valley was in the 15th century though it had limited success. In 1746-47 and 1790-91 the first canals were built to drain the marshs. The municipality along with the Cantons of Bern and Solothurn undertook a major project in 1939-51 to completely drain the valley and channel the river. In 1984 two pumping stations were built to help drain the Limpachmoos marsh.

Beginning in the 19th century many farmers shifted from growing grain to raising dairy cattle. The village dairy and cheese maker opened in 1845. As agriculture became increasingly mechanized, there were fewer jobs in the mostly agrarian village so the population dropped. While a few commuters moved into the village, the population has continued to decline. Limpach formed a school district in 1982 together with Etzelkofen and Mülchi. The village secondary students attend school in Fraubrunnen or the district school in Messen in Solothurn.

== Geography ==
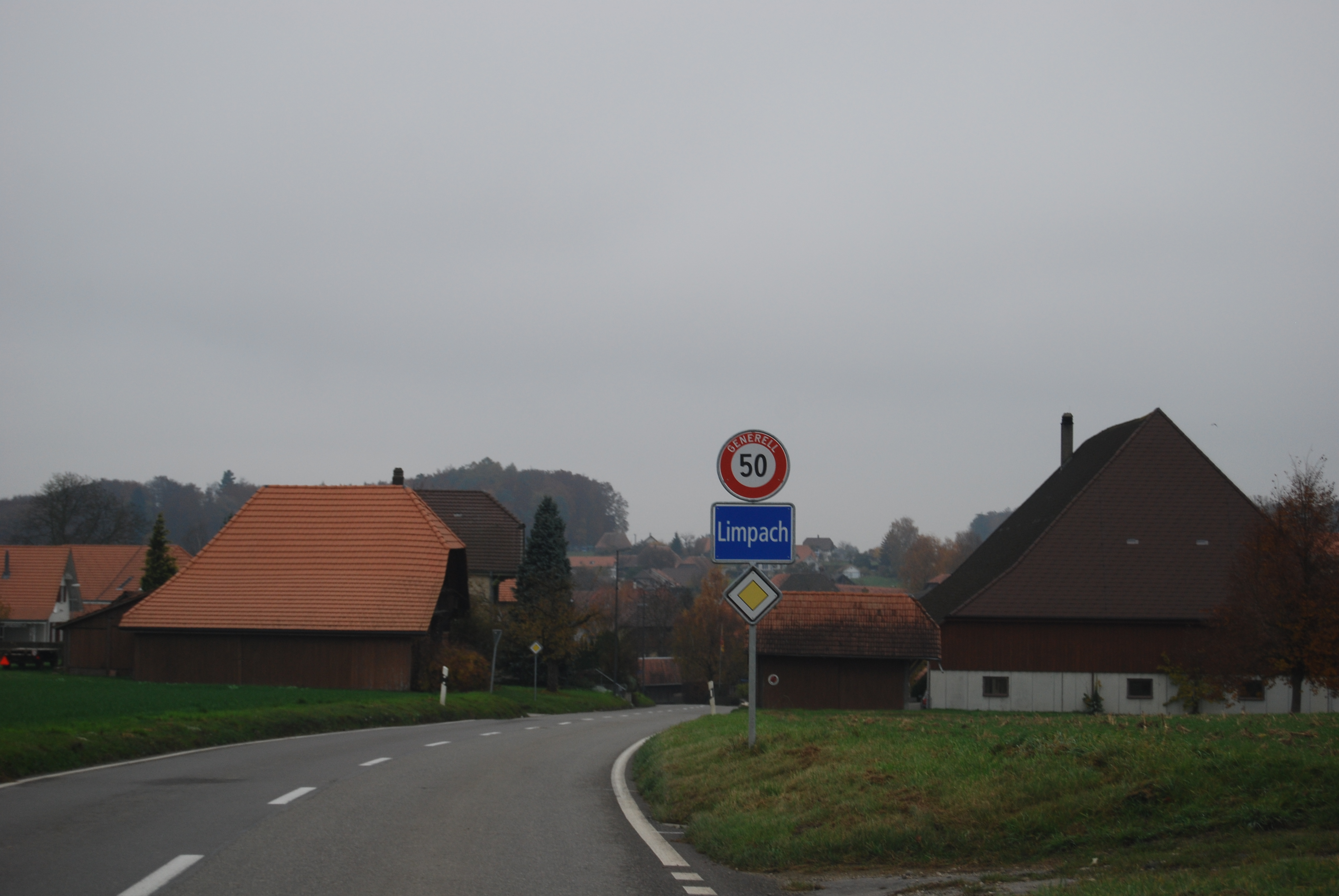
Limpach village and surrounding countryside

Before the merger, Limpach had a total area of 4.4 km^{2} (1.7 mi^{2}). Of this area, 3.13 km^{2} (1.21 mi^{2}) or 70.3% is used for agricultural purposes, while 0.97 km^{2} (0.37 mi^{2}) or 21.8% is forested. Of the rest of the land, 0.33 km^{2} (0.13 mi^{2}) or 7.4% is settled (buildings or roads), 0.01 km^{2} (2.5 acres) or 0.2% is either rivers or lakes.

Of the built up area, housing and buildings made up 3.4% and transportation infrastructure made up 3.6%. Out of the forested land, all of the forested land area is covered with heavy forests. Of the agricultural land, 63.4% is used for growing crops and 5.6% is pastures, while 1.3% is used for orchards or vine crops. All the water in the municipality is flowing water.

Limpach is located in the Limpach valley on the border of the Canton of Solothurn. The parish church of Limpach also serves Büren zum Hof and Schalunen.

On 31 December 2009 Amtsbezirk Fraubrunnen, the municipality's former district, was dissolved. On the following day, 1 January 2010, it joined the newly created Verwaltungskreis Bern-Mittelland.

== Coat of arms ==
The blazon of the municipal coat of arms is Or on a Bend wavy Azure three Fishes Argent. The wavy blue line represents the Limpach river.

== Demographics ==
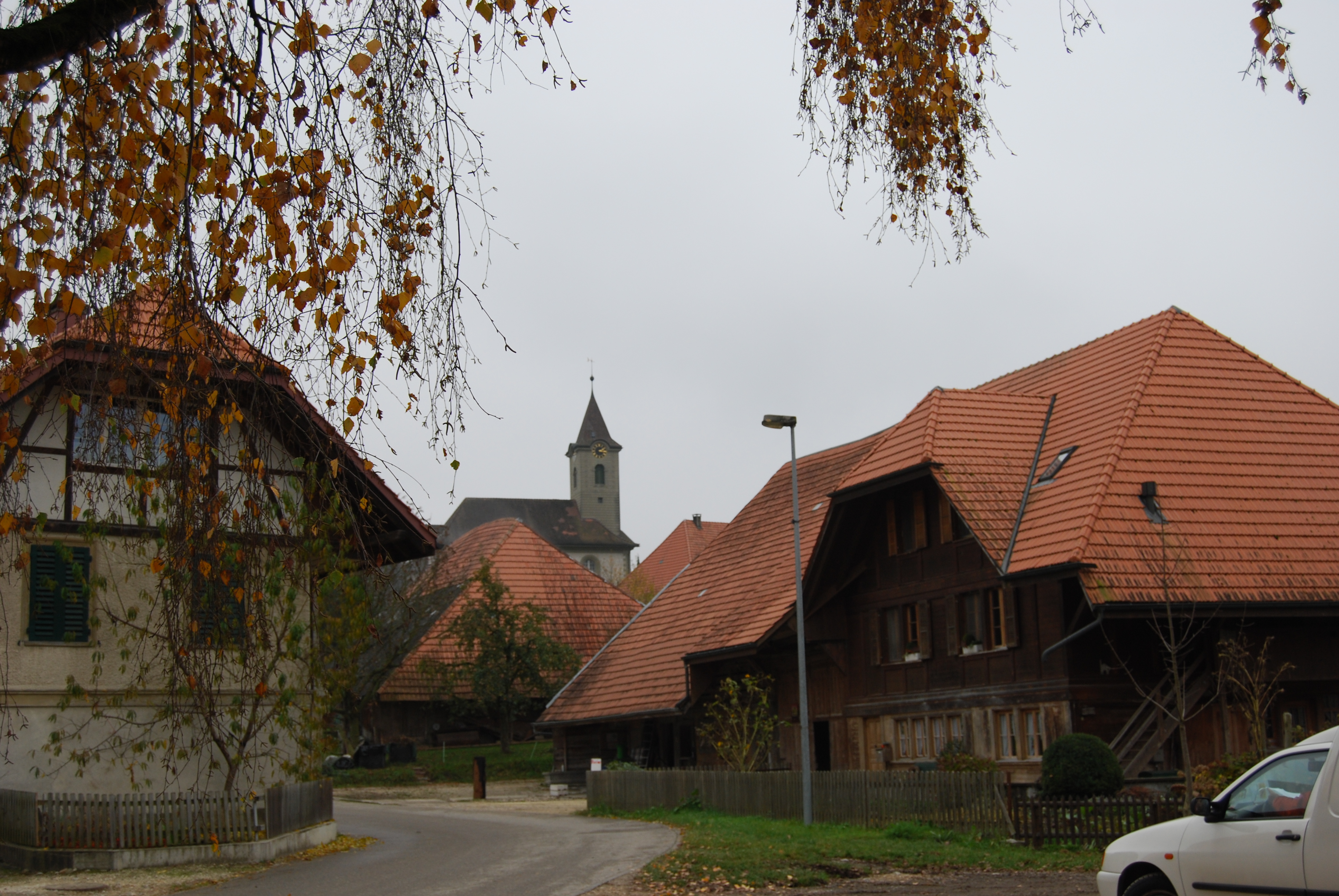
Limpach

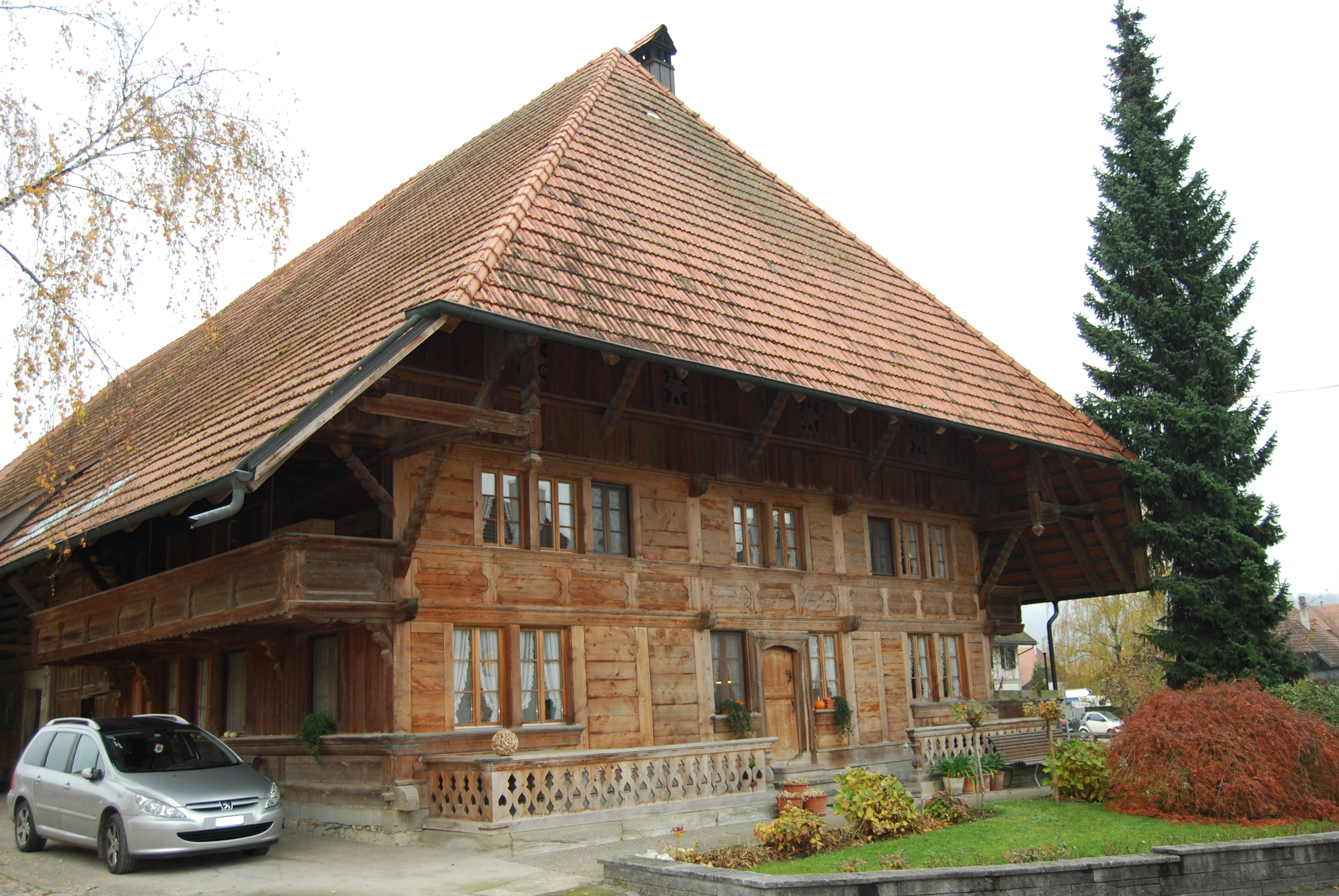
Wooden house in Limpach

Limpach had a population (as of 2011) of 354. As of 2010, 5.3% of the population are resident foreign nationals. Over the last 10 years (2000-2010) the population has changed at a rate of 2.7%. Migration accounted for 7.8%, while births and deaths accounted for -3.9%.

Most of the population (as of 2000) speaks German (315 or 99.7%) as their first language with the rest speaking Albanian

As of 2008, the population was 50.0% male and 50.0% female. The population was made up of 160 Swiss men (47.1% of the population) and 10 (2.9%) non-Swiss men. There were 162 Swiss women (47.6%) and 8 (2.4%) non-Swiss women. Of the population in the municipality, 120 or about 38.0% were born in Limpach and lived there in 2000. There were 122 or 38.6% who were born in the same canton, while 54 or 17.1% were born somewhere else in Switzerland, and 16 or 5.1% were born outside of Switzerland.

As of 2010, children and teenagers (0–19 years old) make up 22.1% of the population, while adults (20–64 years old) make up 61.2% and seniors (over 64 years old) make up 16.8%.

As of 2000, there were 131 people who were single and never married in the municipality. There were 154 married individuals, 25 widows or widowers and 6 individuals who are divorced.

As of 2000, there were 43 households that consist of only one person and 15 households with five or more people. In 2000, a total of 127 apartments (93.4% of the total) were permanently occupied, while 3 apartments (2.2%) were seasonally occupied and 6 apartments (4.4%) were empty. As of 2010, the construction rate of new housing units was 5.9 new units per 1000 residents.

The historical population is given in the following chart:

== Heritage sites of national significance ==
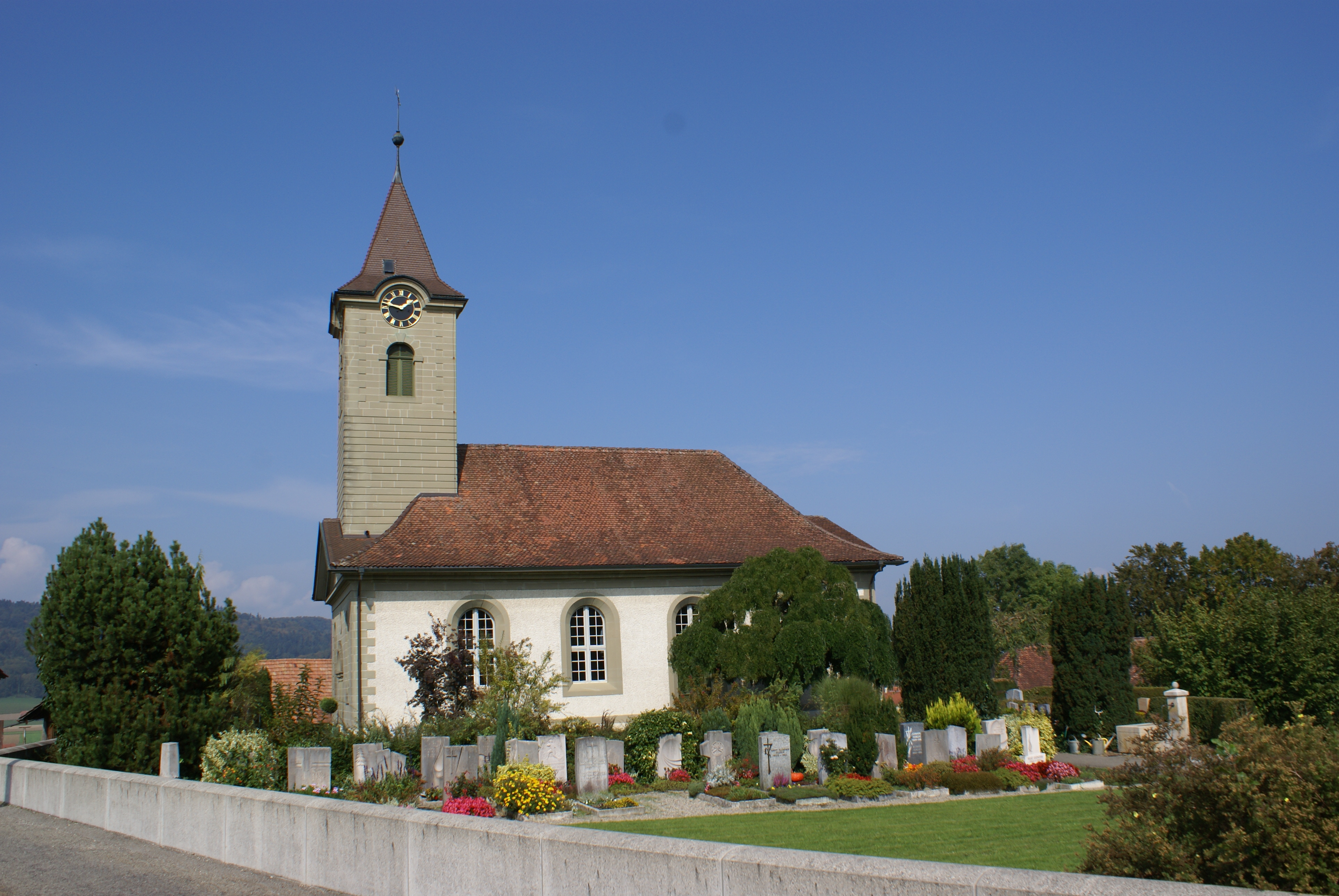
Swiss Reformed church of Limpach

The Swiss Reformed church in Limpach is listed as a Swiss heritage site of national significance. The entire old village of Limpach is part of the Inventory of Swiss Heritage Sites.

== Politics ==
In the 2011 federal election the most popular party was the Swiss People's Party (SVP) which received 52.6% of the vote. The next three most popular parties were the Conservative Democratic Party (BDP) (23.4%), the Green Party (6.3%) and the Social Democratic Party (SP) (5%). In the federal election, a total of 142 votes were cast, and the voter turnout was 52.0%.

== Economy ==
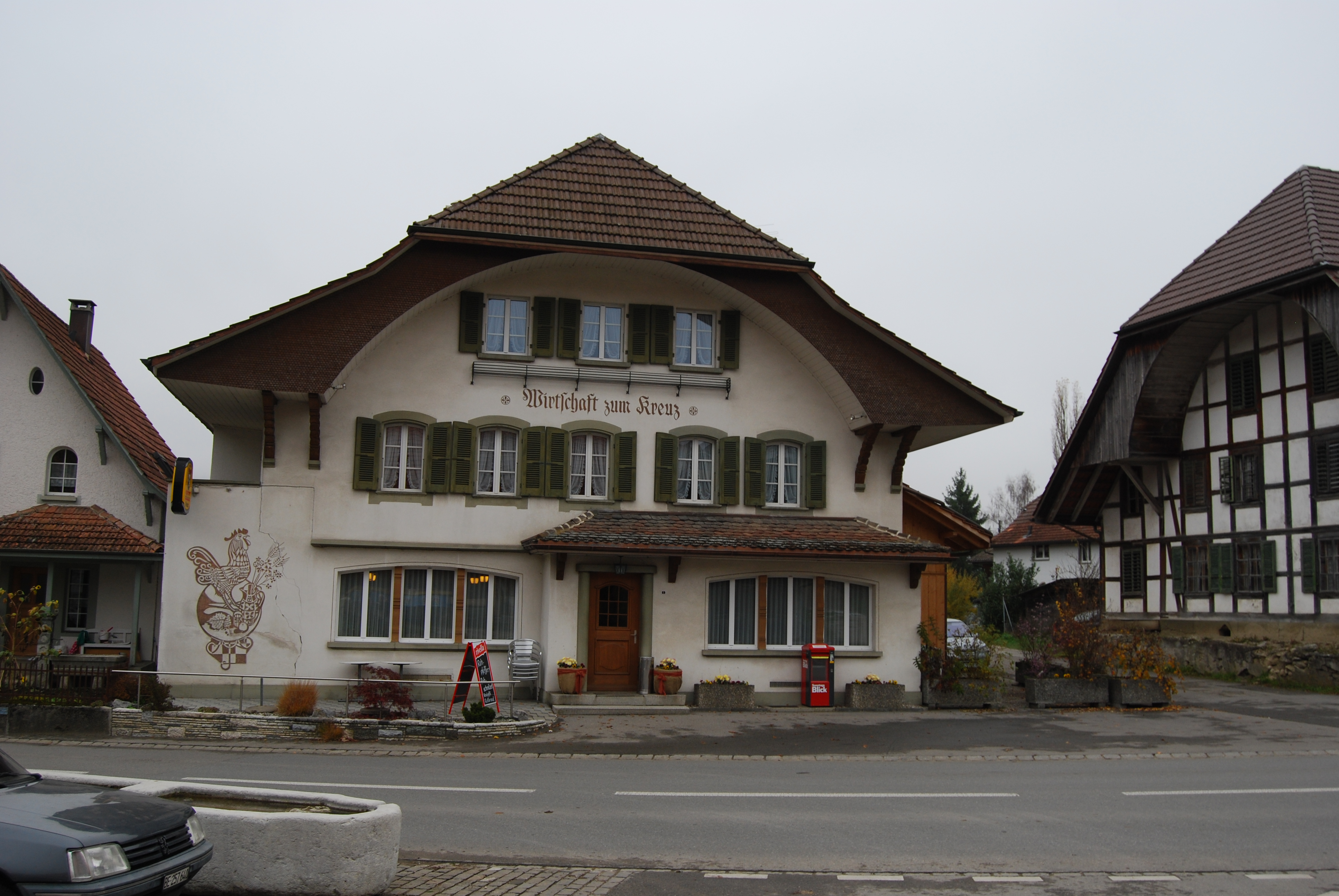
Restaurant zum Kreuz in Limpach

As of 2011, Limpach had an unemployment rate of 0.89%. As of 2008, there were a total of 106 people employed in the municipality. Of these, there were 48 people employed in the primary economic sector and about 15 businesses involved in this sector. 37 people were employed in the secondary sector and there were 3 businesses in this sector. 21 people were employed in the tertiary sector, with 9 businesses in this sector. There were 148 residents of the municipality who were employed in some capacity, of which females made up 40.5% of the workforce.

In 2008 there were a total of 79 full-time equivalent jobs. The number of jobs in the primary sector was 29, all of which were in agriculture. The number of jobs in the secondary sector was 35 of which 1 was in manufacturing and 34 (97.1%) were in construction. The number of jobs in the tertiary sector was 15. In the tertiary sector; 4 or 26.7% were in wholesale or retail sales or the repair of motor vehicles, 1 was in a hotel or restaurant, 4 or 26.7% were technical professionals or scientists, 3 or 20.0% were in education.

In 2000, there were 32 workers who commuted into the municipality and 78 workers who commuted away. The municipality is a net exporter of workers, with about 2.4 workers leaving the municipality for every one entering. Of the working population, 4.7% used public transportation to get to work, and 50.7% used a private car.

== Religion ==
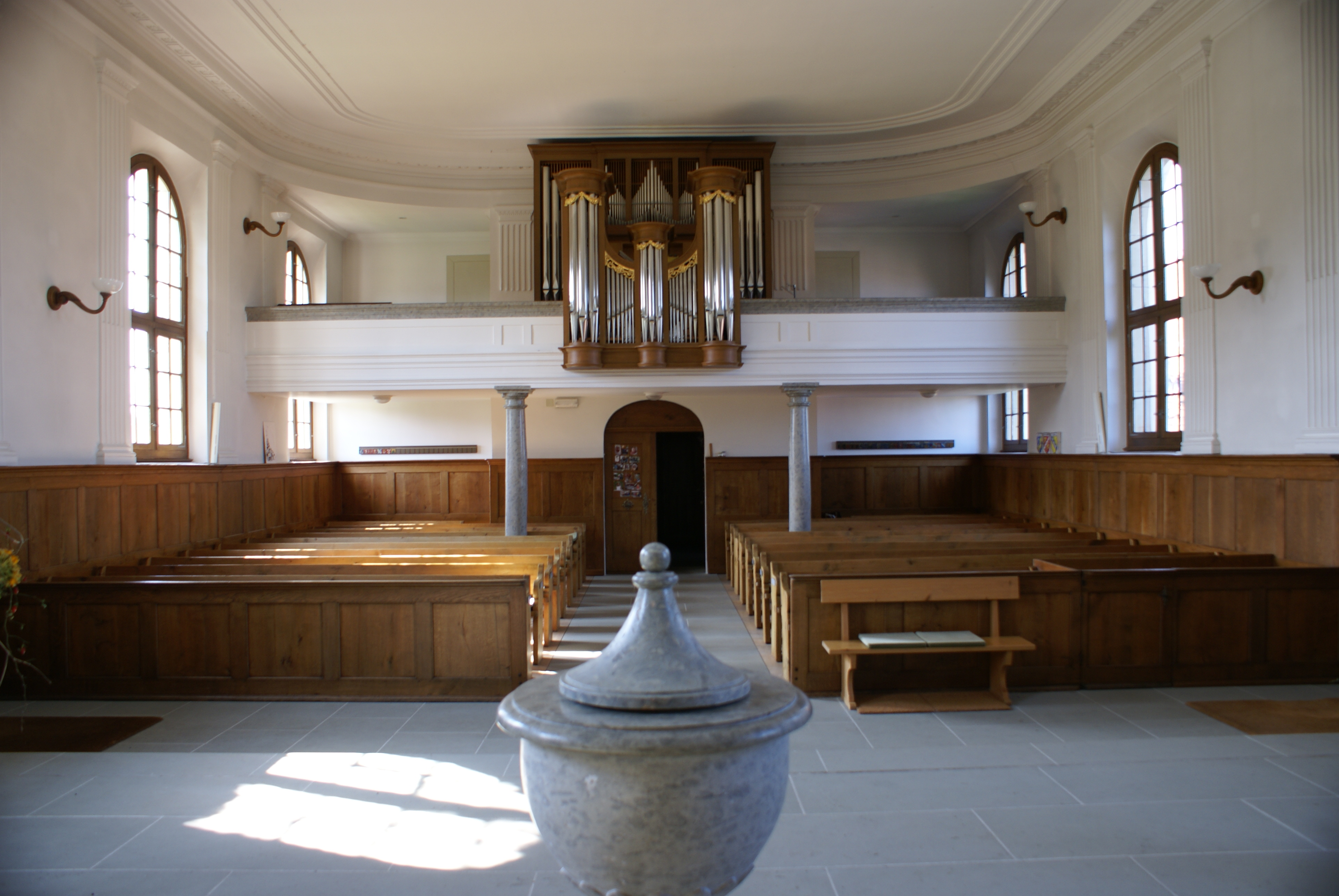
Interior of the Swiss Reformed church in Limpach

From the 2000 census, 11 or 3.5% were Roman Catholic, while 271 or 85.8% belonged to the Swiss Reformed Church. Of the rest of the population, there was 1 member of an Orthodox church, and there were 22 individuals (or about 6.96% of the population) who belonged to another Christian church. There were 10 (or about 3.16% of the population) who were Islamic. 9 (or about 2.85% of the population) belonged to no church, are agnostic or atheist, and 3 individuals (or about 0.95% of the population) did not answer the question.

== Education ==
In Limpach about 131 or (41.5%) of the population have completed non-mandatory upper secondary education, and 25 or (7.9%) have completed additional higher education (either university or a Fachhochschule). Of the 25 who completed tertiary schooling, 72.0% were Swiss men, 20.0% were Swiss women.

The Canton of Bern school system provides one year of non-obligatory Kindergarten, followed by six years of Primary school. This is followed by three years of obligatory lower Secondary school where the students are separated according to ability and aptitude. Following the lower Secondary students may attend additional schooling or they may enter an apprenticeship.

During the 2010-11 school year, there were a total of 34 students attending classes in Limpach. There were no kindergarten classes in the municipality. The municipality had 2 primary classes and 34 students. Of the primary students, 2.9% have a different mother language than the classroom language.

As of 2000, there were 6 students in Limpach who came from another municipality, while 27 residents attended schools outside the municipality.
