= Zauggenried =

- Former municipality
- Flag Coat of arms
- Location of Zauggenried
- Location within Switzerland Location within Canton of Bern
- Coordinates: 47°4′N 7°32′E
- Country: Switzerland
- Canton: Bern
- District: Bern-Mittelland

Area
  - Total: 3.7 km^{2} (1.4 sq mi)
- Elevation: 500 m (1,600 ft)

Population (Dec 2011)
  - Total: 308
  - Density: 83/km^{2} (220/sq mi)
- Time zone: UTC+01:00 (CET)
  - Summer (DST): UTC+02:00 (CEST)
- Postal code: 3309
- SFOS number: 555
- ISO 3166 code: CH-BE
- Surrounded by: Fraubrunnen, Grafenried, Jegenstorf, Kernenried, Münchringen
- Website: SFSO statistics

Zauggenried is a former municipality in the Bern-Mittelland administrative district in the canton of Bern in Switzerland. On 1 January 2014 the former municipalities of Zauggenried, Büren zum Hof, Etzelkofen, Grafenried, Limpach, Mülchi and Schalunen merged into the municipality of Fraubrunnen.

== History ==
Zauggenried is first mentioned in 894 as ad Riete. Between 1261-63 it was mentioned as Reide. In 1336 it was ze dem enren Riede and in 1380 it became Zouggenried.

The village grew up around scattered farms in the marshy land near the Urtenen river. By the 13th century, Fraubrunnen Abbey had acquired rights over the land and the right to hold a low court. The Abbey continued to expand its power in the village and in 1513 became the only landlord and had full jurisdiction. However, in 1528, Bern adopted the Protestant Reformation and secularized the catholic monasteries, including Fraubrunnen Abbey. When they secularized the Abbey, they acquired all the lands that the Abbey had owned. Under Bernese control, Zauggenried became part of the bailiwick of Fraubrunnen. It remained part of the bailiwick, until the Act of Mediation in 1803 dissolved all the old bailiwicks and Zauggenried became part of the new District of Fraubrunnen.

In the 19th century the local farmers switched from raising food crops to raising dairy cattle. In 1850 the Käsereigenossenschaft Kernenried-Zauggenried was established to buy local milk and produce cheese. The cheese factory remaining in operation until 2001. The village has remained generally agrarian and rural and is now zoned to remain that way.

During the 17th century Kernenried and Zauggenried shared a school house. Eventually this partnership lapsed, however it was reestablished and in 1986 they once again formed a single school district.

== Geography ==
Zauggenried had a population (as of 2011) of 308. Of this area, 2.49 km^{2} (0.96 mi^{2}) or 67.8% is used for agricultural purposes, while 0.88 km^{2} (0.34 mi^{2}) or 24.0% is forested. Of the rest of the land, 0.24 km^{2} (0.093 mi^{2}) or 6.5% is settled (buildings or roads), 0.05 km^{2} (12 acres) or 1.4% is either rivers or lakes.

Of the built up area, housing and buildings made up 4.1% and transportation infrastructure made up 2.5%. Out of the forested land, all of the forested land area is covered with heavy forests. Of the agricultural land, 57.8% is used for growing crops and 9.0% is pastures, while 1.1% is used for orchards or vine crops. All the water in the municipality is flowing water.

The former municipality is located on a terrace above the Urtenen valley.

On 31 December 2009 Amtsbezirk Fraubrunnen, the municipality's former district, was dissolved. On the following day, 1 January 2010, it joined the newly created Verwaltungskreis Bern-Mittelland.

== Coat of arms ==
The blazon of the municipal coat of arms is Vert on a Bend Argent two Mullets Gules.

== Demographics ==
Zauggenried had a population (as of 2011) of 308. As of 2010, 2.8% of the population are resident foreign nationals. Over the last 10 years (2000-2010) the population has changed at a rate of 4.3%. Migration accounted for 4.6%, while births and deaths accounted for -0.3%.

Most of the population (as of 2000) speaks German (298 or 99.0%) as their first language. One person speaks French and another speaks Portuguese.

As of 2008, the population was 49.5% male and 50.5% female. The population was made up of 151 Swiss men (47.3% of the population) and 7 (2.2%) non-Swiss men. There were 159 Swiss women (49.8%) and 2 (0.6%) non-Swiss women. Of the population in the municipality, 120 or about 39.9% were born in Zauggenried and lived there in 2000. There were 131 or 43.5% who were born in the same canton, while 32 or 10.6% were born somewhere else in Switzerland, and 10 or 3.3% were born outside of Switzerland.

As of 2010, children and teenagers (0–19 years old) make up 20.4% of the population, while adults (20–64 years old) make up 63.6% and seniors (over 64 years old) make up 16%.

As of 2000, there were 127 people who were single and never married in the municipality. There were 146 married individuals, 18 widows or widowers and 10 individuals who are divorced.

As of 2000, there were 35 households that consist of only one person and 9 households with five or more people. In 2000, a total of 121 apartments (93.8% of the total) were permanently occupied, while 7 apartments (5.4%) were seasonally occupied and one apartment was empty.

The historical population is given in the following chart:

== Politics ==
In the 2011 federal election the most popular party was the Conservative Democratic Party (BDP) which received 32.5% of the vote. The next three most popular parties were the Swiss People's Party (SVP) (30.6%), the Green Party (11.5%) and the Social Democratic Party (SP) (11.3%). In the federal election, a total of 123 votes were cast, and the voter turnout was 50.4%.

== Economy ==
As of 2011, Zauggenried had an unemployment rate of 1.23%. As of 2008, there were a total of 63 people employed in the municipality. Of these, there were 45 people employed in the primary economic sector and about 14 businesses involved in this sector. 3 people were employed in the secondary sector and there were 3 businesses in this sector. 15 people were employed in the tertiary sector, with 8 businesses in this sector. There were 168 residents of the municipality who were employed in some capacity, of which females made up 44.6% of the workforce.

In 2008 there were a total of 45 full-time equivalent jobs. The number of jobs in the primary sector was 31, all in agriculture. The number of jobs in the secondary sector was 3, all in construction. The number of jobs in the tertiary sector was 11. In the tertiary sector; 2 or 18.2% were in wholesale or retail sales or the repair of motor vehicles, 1 was in a hotel or restaurant, 4 or 36.4% were the insurance or financial industry, 3 or 27.3% were technical professionals or scientists, 1 was in education.

In 2000, there were 8 workers who commuted into the municipality and 117 workers who commuted away. The municipality is a net exporter of workers, with about 14.6 workers leaving the municipality for every one entering. Of the working population, 10.1% used public transportation to get to work, and 59.5% used a private car.

== Religion ==
From the 2000 census, 11 or 3.7% were Roman Catholic, while 268 or 89.0% belonged to the Swiss Reformed Church. Of the rest of the population, there was 1 member of an Orthodox church. There were 1 individual who belonged to another church. 20 (or about 6.64% of the population) belonged to no church, are agnostic or atheist.

== Education ==
In Zauggenried about 119 or (39.5%) of the population have completed non-mandatory upper secondary education, and 35 or (11.6%) have completed additional higher education (either university or a Fachhochschule). Of the 35 who completed tertiary schooling, 65.7% were Swiss men, 34.3% were Swiss women.

During the 2010-11 school year, there were no students attending school in Zauggenried.

As of 2000, there were 5 students in Zauggenried who came from another municipality, while 42 residents attended schools outside the municipality.
