= Büren zum Hof =

- Former municipality
- Flag Coat of arms
- Location of Büren zum Hof
- Location within Switzerland Location within Canton of Bern
- Coordinates: 47°6′N 7°31′E
- Country: Switzerland
- Canton: Bern
- District: Bern-Mittelland

Area
  - Total: 3.5 km^{2} (1.4 sq mi)
- Elevation: 510 m (1,670 ft)

Population (December 2011)
  - Total: 467
  - Density: 130/km^{2} (350/sq mi)
- Time zone: UTC+01:00 (CET)
  - Summer (DST): UTC+02:00 (CEST)
- Postal code: 3313
- SFOS number: 534
- ISO 3166 code: CH-BE
- Surrounded by: Etzelkofen, Fraubrunnen, Limpach, Mülchi, Schalunen
- Website: www.buerenzumhof.ch

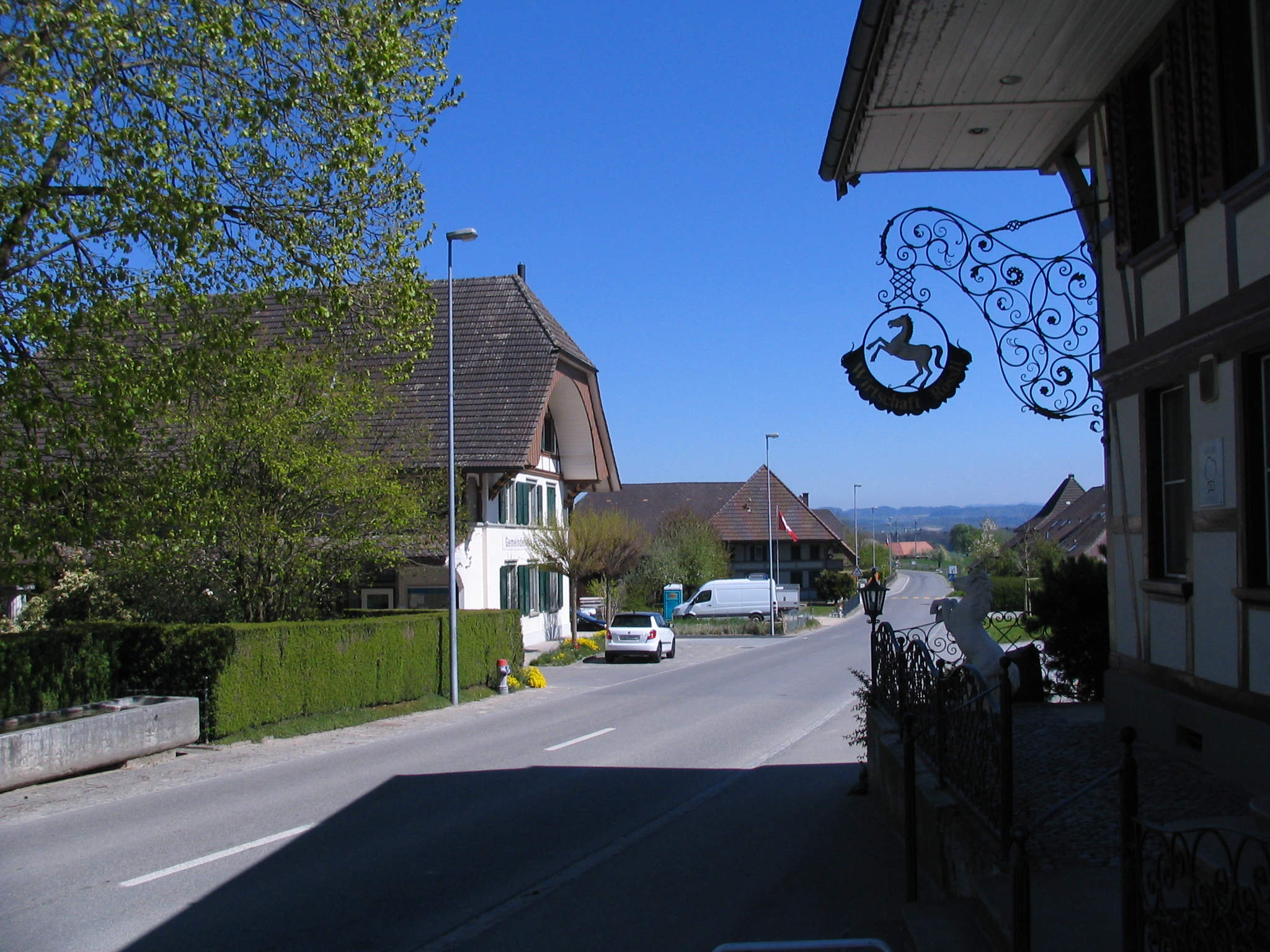
In the village

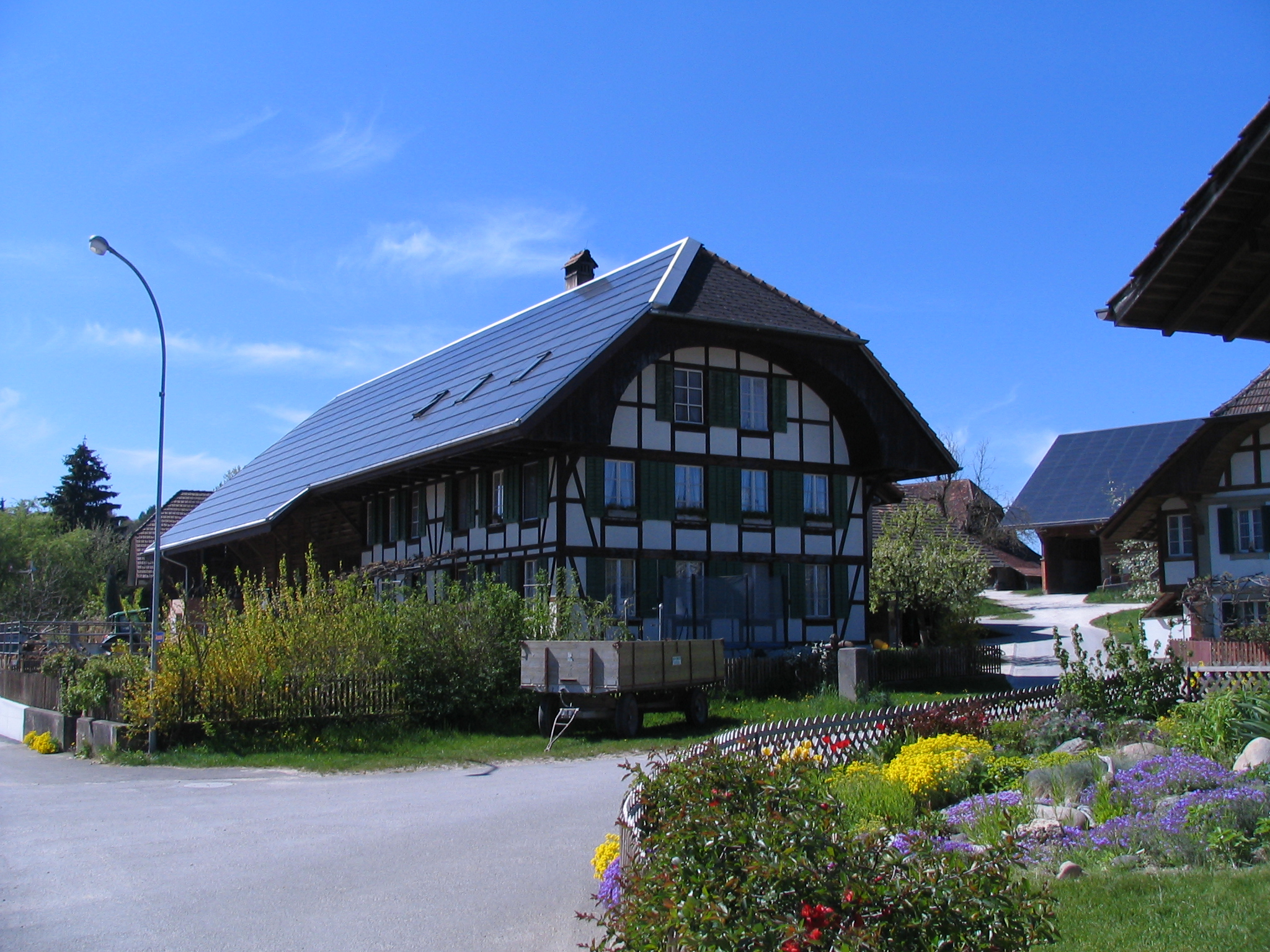
Old houses with solar panels

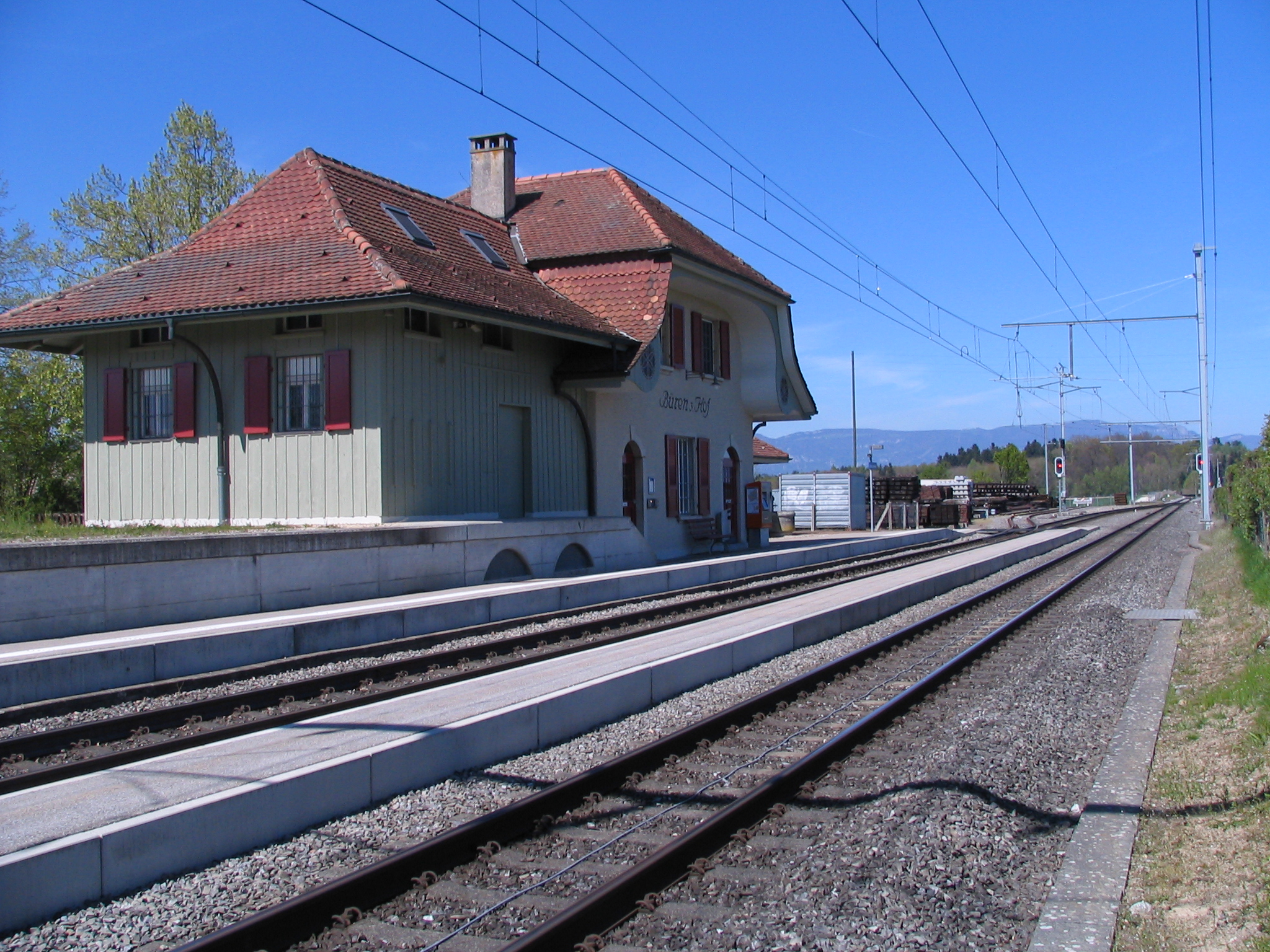
Train station

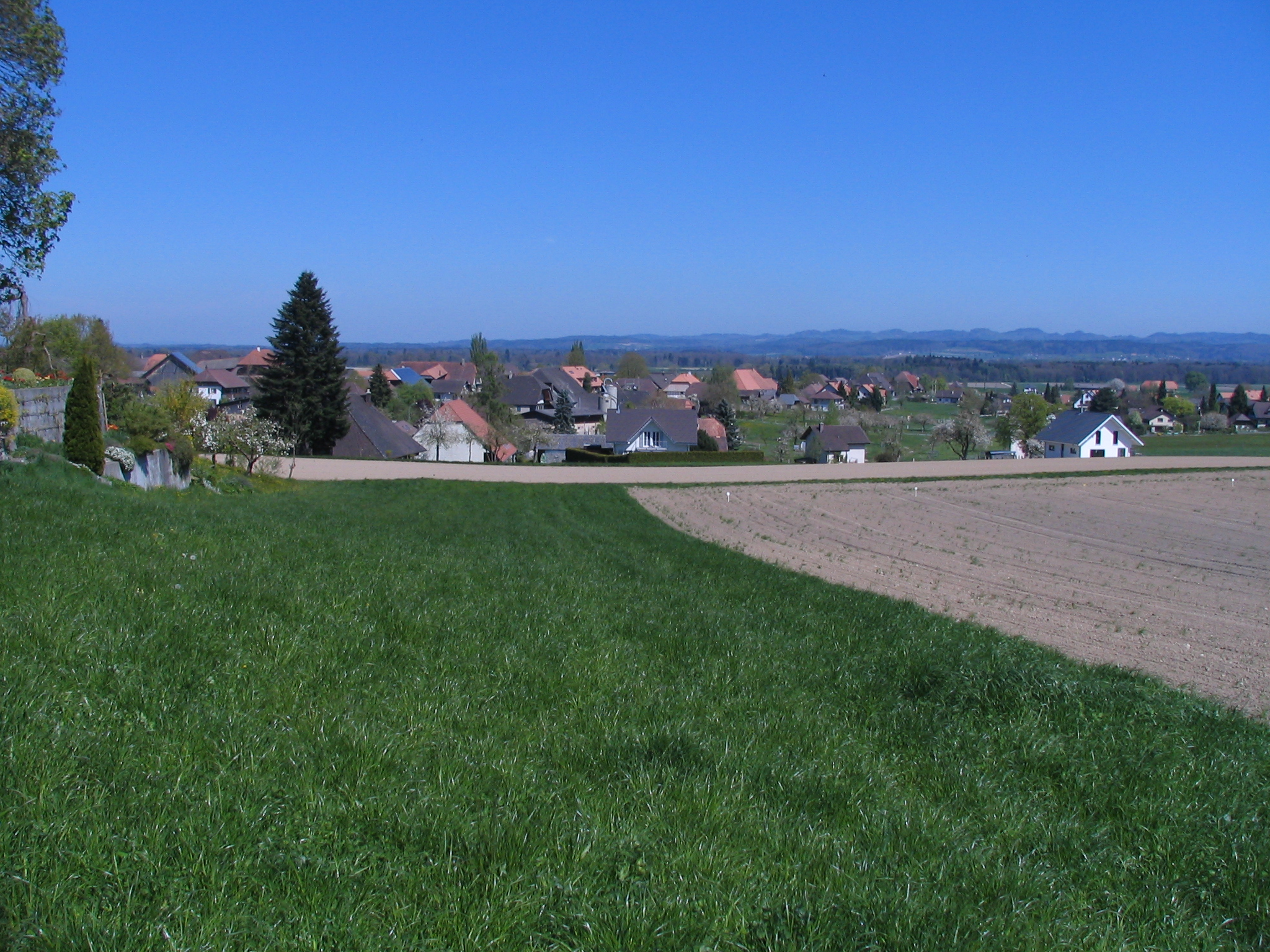
Overview

Büren zum Hof was a municipality in the Bern-Mittelland administrative district in the canton of Bern in Switzerland. On 1 January 2014 the former municipalities of Büren zum Hof, Etzelkofen, Grafenried, Limpach, Mülchi, Schalunen and Zauggenried merged into the municipality of Fraubrunnen.

== History ==
Büren zum Hof is first mentioned in 1249 as Burron. There is a Hallstatt era burial mound in the municipality which indicates that the area was inhabited much earlier. In the earliest mention of the village, the major land holder is listed as the Knight von Schüpfen. In 1255 some of the land was given to the nearby Fraubrunnen Abbey. Over the following century, the Abbey grew to hold most of the farms in the village and the right to dispense the low justice (day to day, minor crimes and trials). Following the Secularization of the monasteries (1528), it became part of the Landvogtei of Fraubrunnen.

== Geography ==
Before the merger, Büren zum Hof had a total area of 3.5 km^{2} (1.4 mi^{2}). Of this area, 2.51 km^{2} (0.97 mi^{2}) or 73.4% is used for agricultural purposes, while 0.64 km^{2} (0.25 mi^{2}) or 18.7% is forested. Of the rest of the land, 0.3 km^{2} (0.12 mi^{2}) or 8.8% is settled (buildings or roads).

Of the built up area, housing and buildings made up 5.0% and transportation infrastructure made up 3.5%. Out of the forested land, all of the forested land area is covered with heavy forests. Of the agricultural land, 65.5% is used for growing crops and 7.6% is pastures.

It is located on the east end of the Rapperswil Plateau and includes the village of Büren zum Hof, and the house clusters of Kapf, Speichhüsli and Neu Dorzenmatten.

On 31 December 2009 Amtsbezirk Fraubrunnen, the municipality's former district, was dissolved. On the following day, 1 January 2010, it joined the newly created Verwaltungskreis Bern-Mittelland.

== Coat of arms ==
The blazon of the municipal coat of arms is Azure a Lion Paw issuant from chief sinister holding a Sickle Argent handled of the second. The lions paw refers to the lion in the coat of arms of the Fraubrunnen district.

== Demographics ==
Büren zum Hof had a population (as of 2011) of 467. As of 2010, 2.7% of the population are resident foreign nationals. Over the last 10 years (2000-2010) the population has changed at a rate of 11.1%. Migration accounted for 5.3%, while births and deaths accounted for 5.3%.

Most of the population (as of 2000) speaks German (421 or 97.7%) as their first language, French is the second most common (3 or 0.7%) and Serbo-Croatian is the third (3 or 0.7%). There is 1 person who speaks Italian.

As of 2008, the population was 48.1% male and 51.9% female. The population was made up of 220 Swiss men (46.4% of the population) and 8 (1.7%) non-Swiss men. There were 241 Swiss women (50.8%) and 5 (1.1%) non-Swiss women. Of the population in the municipality, 128 or about 29.7% were born in Büren zum Hof and lived there in 2000. There were 190 or 44.1% who were born in the same canton, while 82 or 19.0% were born somewhere else in Switzerland, and 21 or 4.9% were born outside of Switzerland.

As of 2010, children and teenagers (0–19 years old) make up 28.3% of the population, while adults (20–64 years old) make up 55.7% and seniors (over 64 years old) make up 16%.

As of 2000, there were 179 people who were single and never married in the municipality. There were 208 married individuals, 31 widows or widowers and 13 individuals who are divorced.

As of 2000, there were 47 households that consist of only one person and 18 households with five or more people. In 2000, a total of 166 apartments (87.8% of the total) were permanently occupied, while 22 apartments (11.6%) were seasonally occupied and one apartment was empty. The vacancy rate for the municipality, in 2011, was 1.03%.

The historical population is given in the following chart:

== Sights ==
The entire village of Büren zum Hof is designated as part of the Inventory of Swiss Heritage Sites.

== Politics ==
In the 2011 federal election the most popular party was the Swiss People's Party (SVP) which received 32.9% of the vote. The next three most popular parties were the Conservative Democratic Party (BDP) (18.9%), the Social Democratic Party (SP) (17%) and the Green Party (14.8%). In the federal election, a total of 217 votes were cast, and the voter turnout was 63.8%.

== Economy ==
As of 2011, Büren zum Hof had an unemployment rate of 0.65%. As of 2008, there were a total of 88 people employed in the municipality. Of these, there were 53 people employed in the primary economic sector and about 15 businesses involved in this sector. 7 people were employed in the secondary sector and there were 3 businesses in this sector. 28 people were employed in the tertiary sector, with 7 businesses in this sector. There were 241 residents of the municipality who were employed in some capacity, of which females made up 42.7% of the workforce.

In 2008 there were a total of 66 full-time equivalent jobs. The number of jobs in the primary sector was 35, all of which were in agriculture. The number of jobs in the secondary sector was 7 of which 6 or (85.7%) were in manufacturing and 1 was in construction. The number of jobs in the tertiary sector was 24. In the tertiary sector; 1 was in the movement and storage of goods, 3 or 12.5% were in a hotel or restaurant, 5 or 20.8% were technical professionals or scientists, 4 or 16.7% were in education.

In 2000, there were 16 workers who commuted into the municipality and 189 workers who commuted away. The municipality is a net exporter of workers, with about 11.8 workers leaving the municipality for every one entering. Of the working population, 24.9% used public transportation to get to work, and 51.5% used a private car.

== Religion ==
From the 2000 census, 44 or 10.2% were Roman Catholic, while 327 or 75.9% belonged to the Swiss Reformed Church. Of the rest of the population, there were 34 individuals (or about 7.89% of the population) who belonged to another Christian church. There were 4 (or about 0.93% of the population) who were Islamic. 30 (or about 6.96% of the population) belonged to no church, are agnostic or atheist, and 8 individuals (or about 1.86% of the population) did not answer the question.

== Education ==
In Büren zum Hof about 180 or (41.8%) of the population have completed non-mandatory upper secondary education, and 81 or (18.8%) have completed additional higher education (either university or a Fachhochschule). Of the 81 who completed tertiary schooling, 66.7% were Swiss men, 28.4% were Swiss women.

The Canton of Bern school system provides one year of non-obligatory Kindergarten, followed by six years of Primary school. This is followed by three years of obligatory lower Secondary school where the students are separated according to ability and aptitude. Following the lower Secondary students may attend additional schooling or they may enter an apprenticeship.

During the 2010-11 school year, there were a total of 53 students attending classes in Büren zum Hof. There was one kindergarten class with a total of 20 students in the municipality. The municipality had 2 primary classes and 33 students. Of the primary students, and 6.1% have a different mother language than the classroom language.

As of 2000, there were 2 students in Büren zum Hof who came from another municipality, while 45 residents attended schools outside the municipality.
