= Etzelkofen =

- Former municipality
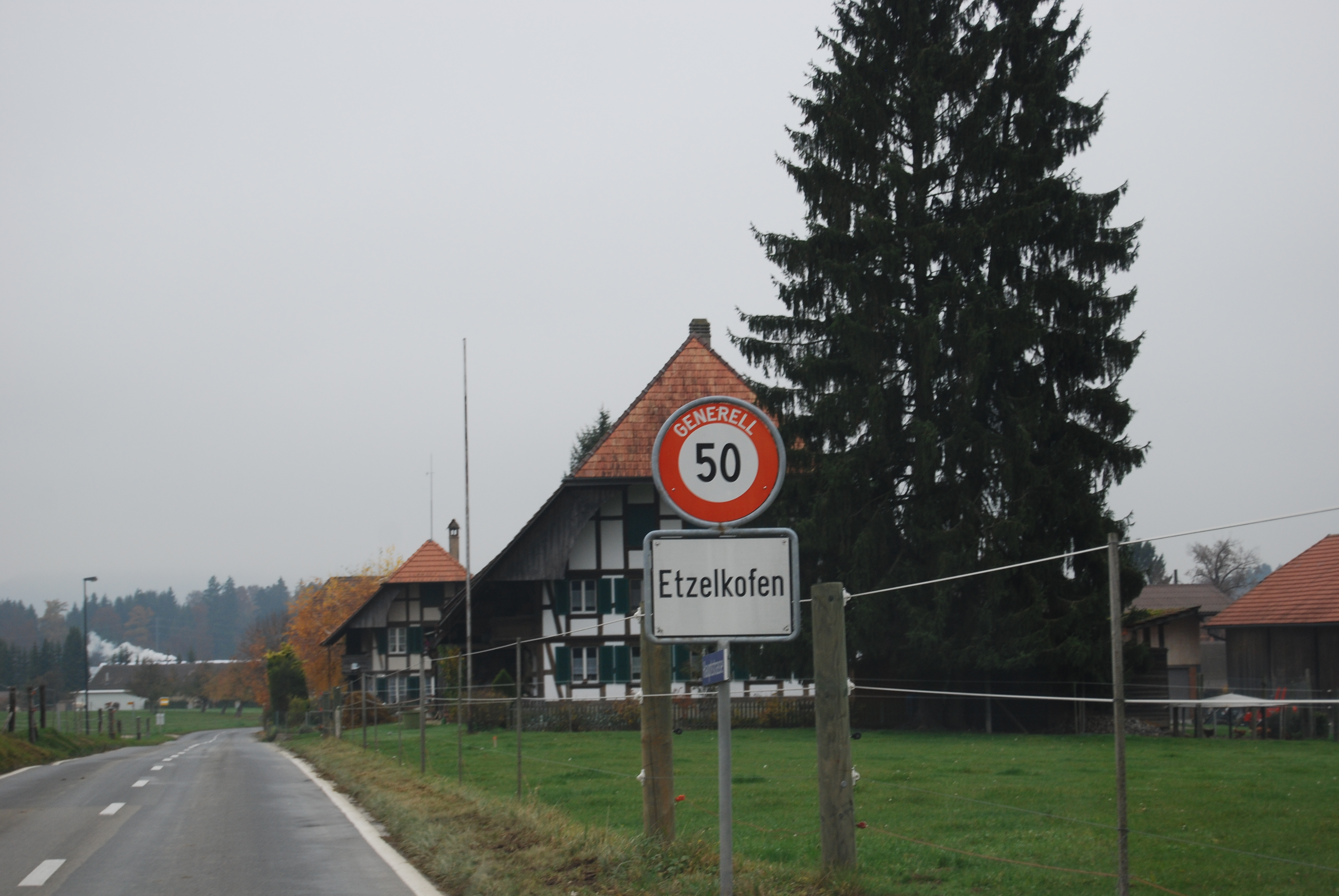
- Etzelkofen village entrance

- Flag Coat of arms
- Location of Etzelkofen
- Location within Switzerland Location within Canton of Bern
- Coordinates: 47°5′N 7°29′E
- Country: Switzerland
- Canton: Bern
- District: Bern-Mittelland

Area
  - Total: 2.8 km^{2} (1.1 sq mi)
- Elevation: 529 m (1,736 ft)

Population (Dec 2011)
  - Total: 291
  - Density: 100/km^{2} (270/sq mi)
- Time zone: UTC+01:00 (CET)
  - Summer (DST): UTC+02:00 (CEST)
- Postal code: 3306
- SFOS number: 537
- ISO 3166 code: CH-BE
- Surrounded by: Brunnenthal (SO), Büren zum Hof, Fraubrunnen, Grafenried, Iffwil, Messen (SO), Mülchi, Scheunen
- Website: SFSO statistics

Etzelkofen is a former municipality in the Bern-Mittelland administrative district in the canton of Bern in Switzerland. On 1 January 2014 the former municipalities of Etzelkofen, Büren zum Hof, Grafenried, Limpach, Mülchi, Schalunen and Zauggenried merged into the municipality of Fraubrunnen.

== History ==
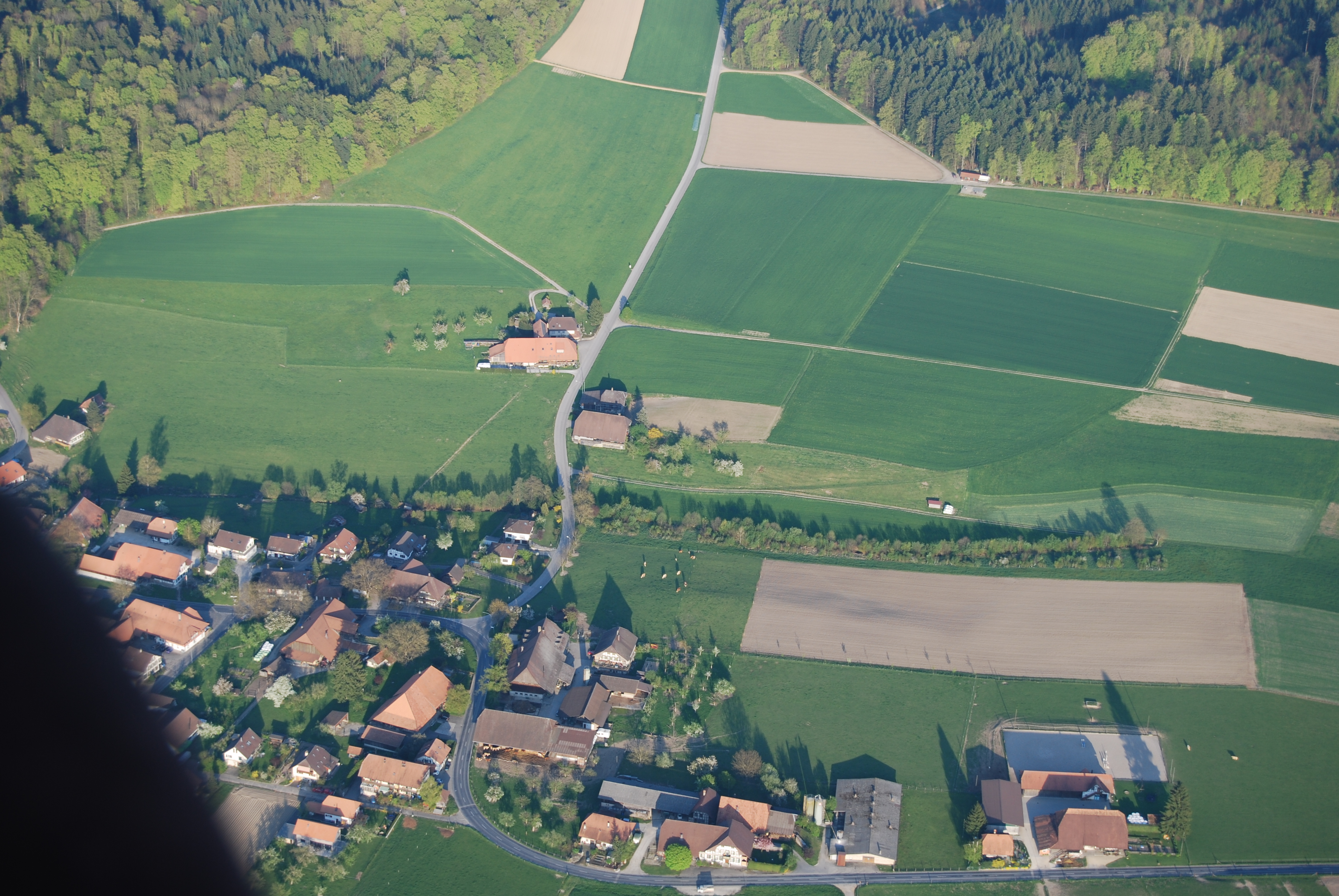
Fields outside the village of Etzelkofen

Etzelkofen is first mentioned in 1302 as villa Ezenchoven.

During the Middle Ages, Etzelkofen village belonged to the Herrschaft of Messen. In the 14th century Fraubrunnen Abbey acquired the land rights over the village from Messen. In 1373, the Abbey attempted to expand their rights to include the Zwing und Bann right (the right to judge all court cases except capital crimes). Messen blocked the Abbey and was able to retain their jurisdiction over Etzelkofen. The high court for the village was in Zollikofen. In 1406 the entire area came under Bernese control. However, in 1410 the collegiate church of St. Ursen in Solothurn, citing a donation from 1278, claimed authority over the Herrschaft of Messen. Two years later Solothurn was able to claim jurisdiction over the village of Etzelkofen and incorporate it into the bailiwick of Bucheggberg. For over two centuries Etzelkofen remained part of Solothurn until the treaty of 1665 (the Wynigervertrag) between Solothurn and Bern transferred the village to Bern where it became part of the bailiwick of Fraubrunnen. The village remained part of the Solothurn parish of Messen. In 1833 the municipality (Einwohnergemeinde) of Bernisch-Messen was created with the mostly independent villages of Etzelkofen, Mülchi, Messen-Scheunen, Bangerten and Ruppoldsried. In 1921 it was renamed the Gemeindeverband Bernisch-Messen and in 1979 it became the Fürsorgeverband Etzelkofen und Umgebung (Welfare society of Etzelkofen and surroundings).

Beginning in the 19th century many farmers began to raise dairy cattle in addition or instead of growing grain. In 1851 a dairy was built in the village to support the dairy farmers. Today agriculture still dominates the local economy, though a brick factory opened in 1967. Since 1982, it has been part of a school and community association with Limpach and Mülchi.

== Geography ==
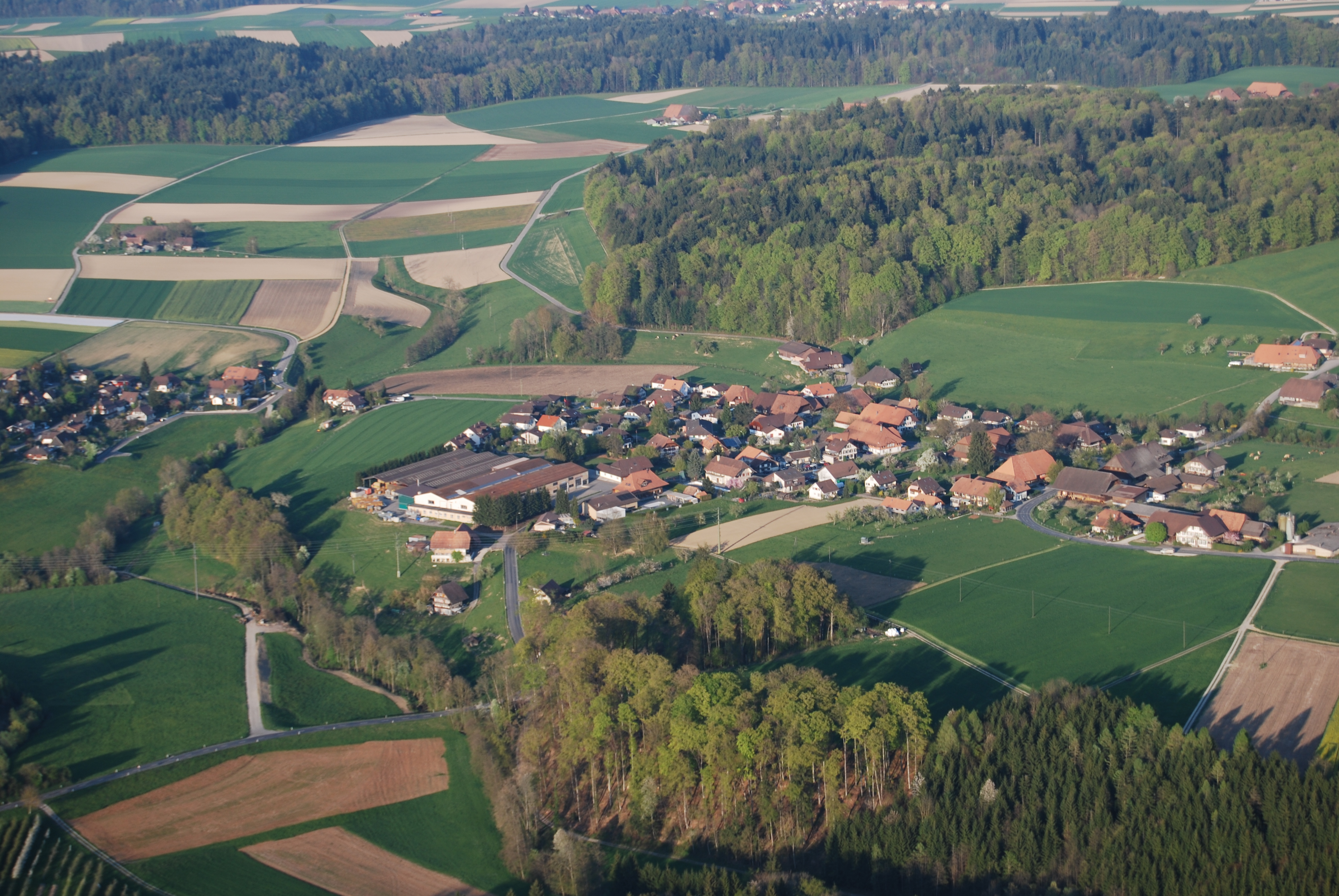
Aerial view of Etzelkofen

Before the merger, Etzelkofen had a total area of 2.8 km^{2} (1.1 mi^{2}). Of this area, 1.66 km^{2} (0.64 mi^{2}) or 59.1% is used for agricultural purposes, while 1 km^{2} (0.39 mi^{2}) or 35.6% is forested. Of the rest of the land, 0.15 km^{2} (37 acres) or 5.3% is settled (buildings or roads) and 0.01 km^{2} (2.5 acres) or 0.4% is unproductive land.

Of the built up area, housing and buildings made up 3.9% and transportation infrastructure made up 1.1%. Out of the forested land, all of the forested land area is covered with heavy forests. Of the agricultural land, 42.3% is used for growing crops and 15.3% is pastures, while 1.4% is used for orchards or vine crops.

It is located on the Rapperswil plateau.

On 31 December 2009 Amtsbezirk Fraubrunnen, the municipality's former district, was dissolved. On the following day, 1 January 2010, it joined the newly created Verwaltungskreis Bern-Mittelland.

== Coat of arms ==
The blazon of the municipal coat of arms is Azure an Arm armoured Argent issuant from sinister holding a Sceptre of the same.

== Demographics ==
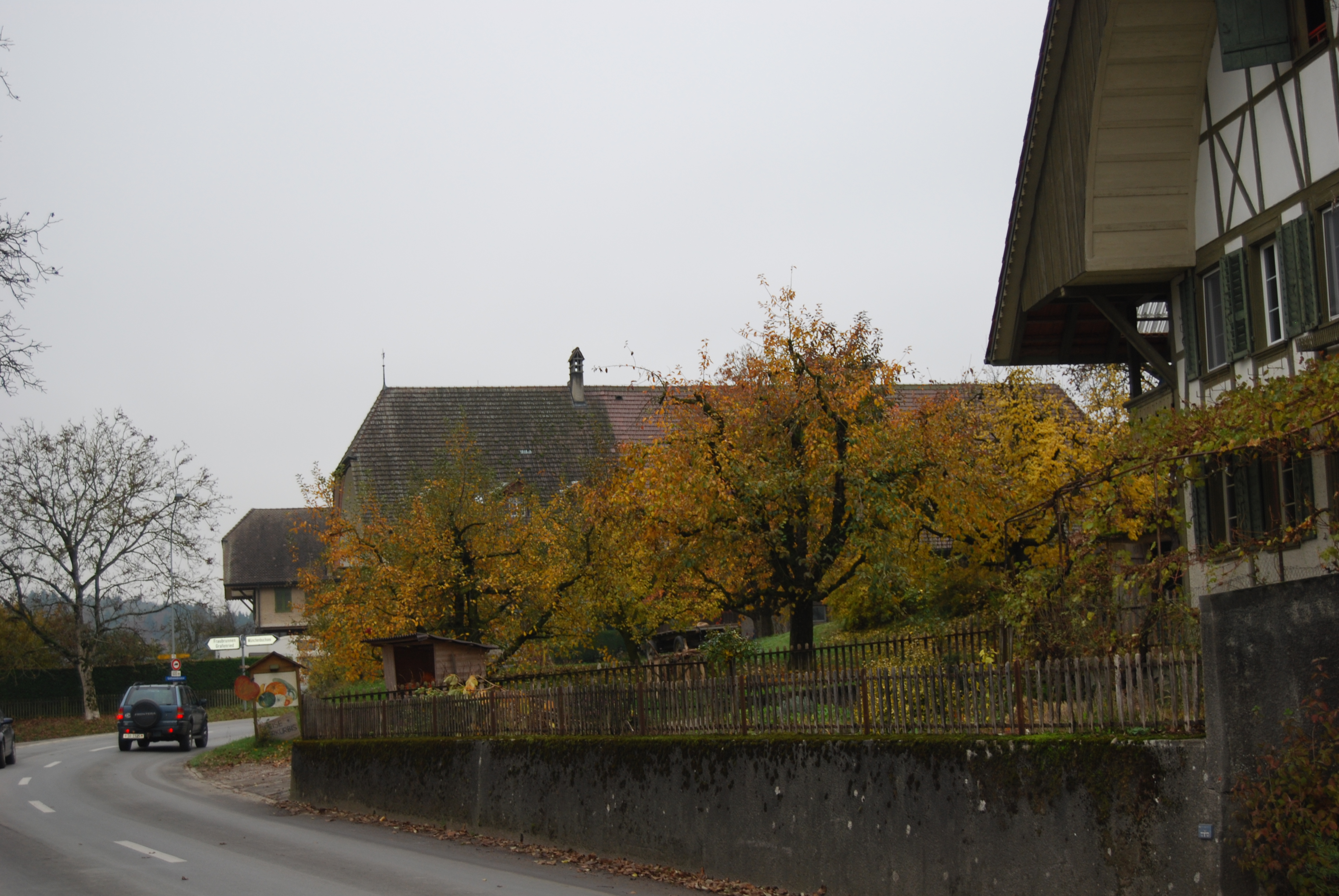
Etzelkofen village

Etzelkofen had a population (as of 2011) of 291. As of 2010, 3.1% of the population are resident foreign nationals. Over the last 10 years (2000-2010) the population has changed at a rate of -13.8%. Migration accounted for -6.5%, while births and deaths accounted for -3.2%.

Most of the population (as of 2000) speaks German (355 or 99.2%) as their first language, English is the second most common (2 or 0.6%) and French is the third (1 or 0.3%).

As of 2008, the population was 51.5% male and 48.5% female. The population was made up of 147 Swiss men (50.2% of the population) and 4 (1.4%) non-Swiss men. There were 137 Swiss women (46.8%) and 5 (1.7%) non-Swiss women. Of the population in the municipality who answered the 2000 census, 3 were born somewhere else in Switzerland, and 9 or 2.5% were born outside of Switzerland.

As of 2010, children and teenagers (0–19 years old) make up 13% of the population, while adults (20–64 years old) make up 70.6% and seniors (over 64 years old) make up 16.4%.

As of 2000, there were 152 people who were single and never married in the municipality. There were 184 married individuals, 11 widows or widowers and 11 individuals who are divorced.

As of 2000, there were 26 households that consist of only one person and 18 households with five or more people. In 2000, a total of 103 apartments (83.7% of the total) were permanently occupied, while 19 apartments (15.4%) were seasonally occupied and one apartment was empty. As of 2010, the construction rate of new housing units was 3.4 new units per 1000 residents. The vacancy rate for the municipality, in 2011, was 0.66%.

The historical population is given in the following chart:

== Politics ==
In the 2011 federal election the most popular party was the Swiss People's Party (SVP) which received 44.2% of the vote. The next three most popular parties were the Conservative Democratic Party (BDP) (24.3%), the Social Democratic Party (SP) (6.1%) and the Green Liberal Party (GLP) (5.6%). In the federal election, a total of 134 votes were cast, and the voter turnout was 52.8%.

== Economy ==
As of 2011, Etzelkofen had an unemployment rate of 0.85%. As of 2008, there were a total of 75 people employed in the municipality. Of these, there were 24 people employed in the primary economic sector and about 9 businesses involved in this sector. 21 people were employed in the secondary sector and there were 6 businesses in this sector. 30 people were employed in the tertiary sector, with 13 businesses in this sector. There were 186 residents of the municipality who were employed in some capacity, of which females made up 46.2% of the workforce.

In 2008 there were a total of 55 full-time equivalent jobs. The number of jobs in the primary sector was 14, all in agriculture. The number of jobs in the secondary sector was 20 of which 5 or (25.0%) were in manufacturing and 15 (75.0%) were in construction. The number of jobs in the tertiary sector was 21. In the tertiary sector; 5 or 23.8% were in wholesale or retail sales or the repair of motor vehicles, 3 or 14.3% were in a hotel or restaurant, 6 or 28.6% were technical professionals or scientists, 3 or 14.3% were in education.

In 2000, there were 12 workers who commuted into the municipality and 118 workers who commuted away. The municipality is a net exporter of workers, with about 9.8 workers leaving the municipality for every one entering. Of the working population, 3.2% used public transportation to get to work, and 67.7% used a private car.

== Religion ==
From the 2000 census, 28 or 7.8% were Roman Catholic, while 288 or 80.4% belonged to the Swiss Reformed Church. 20 (or about 5.59% of the population) belonged to no church, are agnostic or atheist, and 22 individuals (or about 6.15% of the population) did not answer the question.

== Education ==
The Canton of Bern school system provides one year of non-obligatory Kindergarten, followed by six years of Primary school. This is followed by three years of obligatory lower Secondary school where the students are separated according to ability and aptitude. Following the lower Secondary students may attend additional schooling or they may enter an apprenticeship.

During the 2010-11 school year, there were a total of 13 students attending classes in Etzelkofen. There were no kindergarten classes in the municipality. The municipality had one primary class and 13 students.

As of 2000, there were 29 students in Etzelkofen who came from another municipality, while 42 residents attended schools outside the municipality.
