= Grafenried =

There are several municipalities and communities that have the name Grafenried.

== in Bavaria, Germany ==
- Grafenried Gem. Nittendorf
- Grafenried (Sinzing), Regensburg
- Grafenried (Regen), Regen
- Grafenried (Cham), Cham

== In Switzerland ==
- Grafenried, Switzerland, in the Canton of Bern
