= Schalunen =

- Former municipality
- Flag Coat of arms
- Location of Schalunen
- Location within Switzerland Location within Canton of Bern
- Coordinates: 47°7′N 7°32′E
- Country: Switzerland
- Canton: Bern
- District: Bern-Mittelland

Area
  - Total: 1.4 km^{2} (0.54 sq mi)
- Elevation: 500 m (1,600 ft)

Population (Dec 2011)
  - Total: 359
  - Density: 260/km^{2} (660/sq mi)
- Time zone: UTC+01:00 (CET)
  - Summer (DST): UTC+02:00 (CEST)
- Postal code: 3314
- SFOS number: 549
- ISO 3166 code: CH-BE
- Surrounded by: Bätterkinden, Büren zum Hof, Fraubrunnen, Limpach
- Website: SFSO statistics

Schalunen is a former municipality in the Bern-Mittelland administrative district in the canton of Bern in Switzerland. On 1 January 2014 the former municipalities of Schalunen, Büren zum Hof, Etzelkofen, Grafenried, Limpach, Mülchi and Zauggenried merged into the municipality of Fraubrunnen.

== History ==
Schalunen is first mentioned in 1249 as Chaluna.

The oldest trace of a settlement in the area is a massive La Tène golden bracelet which was discovered north of the village in 1864. During the Late Middle Ages the village was owned by Fraubrunnen Abbey. After the Abbey was secularized during the Protestant Reformation, Schalunen village became part of the Bernese bailiwick of Fraubrunnen. After the Act of Mediation in 1803, the village became part of the new district of Fraubrunnen.

The residents of the village were always part of the parish of Limpach.

During the 19th century, many of the local farms shifted to raising dairy cattle, and the village's dairy opened in 1852. In 1916 the Bern-Solothurn-Bahn (now Regionalverkehr Bern-Solothurn) built a railway station in the village. In the 1960s the A1 motorway was built near the village. Both the railroad and the motorway provided easy access to the nearby cities of Bern and Solothurn and allowed commuters to settle in Schalunen. In the 1970s the Unterfeld and Holzrüti neighborhoods were built to house the growing population. By 2005 only about one quarter of all jobs in the village were in agriculture, while about half were in industry.

Schalunen and Bätterkinden form a primary school district, while secondary school students attend classes in Fraubrunnen.

== Geography ==
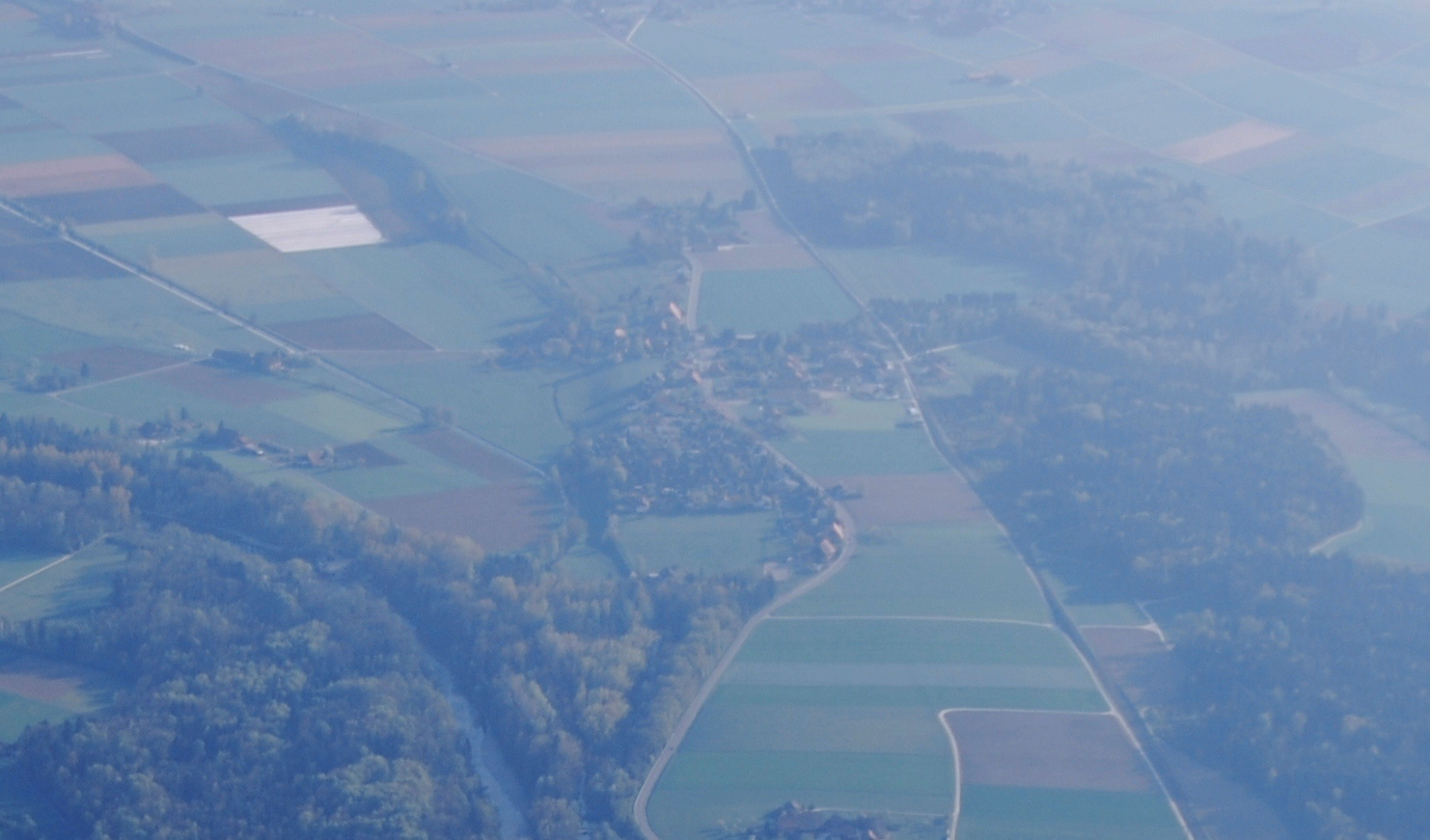
Aerial view of Schalunen village

SBefore the merger, Schalunen had a total area of 1.4 km^{2} (0.54 mi^{2}). Of this area, 0.82 km^{2} (0.32 mi^{2}) or 59.0% is used for agricultural purposes, while 0.43 km^{2} (0.17 mi^{2}) or 30.9% is forested. Of the rest of the land, 0.15 km^{2} (37 acres) or 10.8% is settled (buildings or roads).

Of the built up area, housing and buildings made up 7.2% and transportation infrastructure made up 2.9%. Out of the forested land, all of the forested land area is covered with heavy forests. Of the agricultural land, 43.9% is used for growing crops and 12.2% is pastures, while 2.9% is used for orchards or vine crops.

The former municipality is located on the slopes above the Urtenen river.

On 31 December 2009 Amtsbezirk Fraubrunnen, the municipality's former district, was dissolved. On the following day, 1 January 2010, it joined the newly created Verwaltungskreis Bern-Mittelland.

== Coat of arms ==
The blazon of the municipal coat of arms is Gules a Bend sinister dancety compony Argent between two Trefoils Or.

== Demographics ==
Schalunen had a population (as of 2011) of 359. As of 2010, 11.1% of the population are resident foreign nationals. Over the last 10 years (2000-2010) the population has changed at a rate of -4.1%. Migration accounted for -0.5%, while births and deaths accounted for 4.1%.

Most of the population (as of 2000) speaks German (333 or 95.1%) as their first language.

As of 2008, the population was 49.7% male and 50.3% female. The population was made up of 169 Swiss men (44.5% of the population) and 20 (5.3%) non-Swiss men. There were 169 Swiss women (44.5%) and 22 (5.8%) non-Swiss women. Of the population in the municipality, 66 or about 18.9% were born in Schalunen and lived there in 2000. There were 183 or 52.3% who were born in the same canton, while 64 or 18.3% were born somewhere else in Switzerland, and 34 or 9.7% were born outside of Switzerland.

As of 2010, children and teenagers (0–19 years old) make up 23.4% of the population, while adults (20–64 years old) make up 66.6% and seniors (over 64 years old) make up 10%.

As of 2000, there were 167 people who were single and never married in the municipality. There were 152 married individuals, 17 widows or widowers and 14 individuals who are divorced.

As of 2000, there were 28 households that consist of only one person and 10 households with five or more people. In 2000, a total of 133 apartments (92.4% of the total) were permanently occupied, while 5 apartments (3.5%) were seasonally occupied and 6 apartments (4.2%) were empty. The vacancy rate for the municipality, in 2011, was 2.5%.

The historical population is given in the following chart:

== Politics ==
In the 2011 federal election the most popular party was the Swiss People's Party (SVP) which received 42.2% of the vote. The next three most popular parties were the Conservative Democratic Party (BDP) (20.7%), the Social Democratic Party (SP) (14.3%) and the Green Party (7%). In the federal election, a total of 133 votes were cast, and the voter turnout was 53.0%.

== Economy ==
As of 2011, Schalunen had an unemployment rate of 1.73%. As of 2008, there were a total of 53 people employed in the municipality. Of these, there were 14 people employed in the primary economic sector and about 6 businesses involved in this sector. 15 people were employed in the secondary sector and there were 3 businesses in this sector. 24 people were employed in the tertiary sector, with 6 businesses in this sector. There were 198 residents of the municipality who were employed in some capacity, of which females made up 38.9% of the workforce.

In 2008 there were a total of 39 full-time equivalent jobs. The number of jobs in the primary sector was 10, all of which were in agriculture. The number of jobs in the secondary sector was 14, all of which were in manufacturing. The number of jobs in the tertiary sector was 15. In the tertiary sector; 10 or 66.7% were in wholesale or retail sales or the repair of motor vehicles, 1 was a technical professional or scientist, 3 or 20.0% were in education.

In 2000, there were 11 workers who commuted into the municipality and 170 workers who commuted away. The municipality is a net exporter of workers, with about 15.5 workers leaving the municipality for every one entering. Of the working population, 33.8% used public transportation to get to work, and 50.5% used a private car.

== Religion ==
From the 2000 census, 47 or 13.4% were Roman Catholic, while 255 or 72.9% belonged to the Swiss Reformed Church. Of the rest of the population, there were 5 members of an Orthodox church (or about 1.43% of the population), and there were 10 individuals (or about 2.86% of the population) who belonged to another Christian church. There were 4 (or about 1.14% of the population) who were Islamic. There was 1 person who was Buddhist. 29 (or about 8.29% of the population) belonged to no church, are agnostic or atheist, and 4 individuals (or about 1.14% of the population) did not answer the question.

== Education ==
In Schalunen about 153 or (43.7%) of the population have completed non-mandatory upper secondary education, and 37 or (10.6%) have completed additional higher education (either university or a Fachhochschule). Of the 37 who completed tertiary schooling, 81.1% were Swiss men, 13.5% were Swiss women.

The Canton of Bern school system provides one year of non-obligatory Kindergarten, followed by six years of Primary school. This is followed by three years of obligatory lower Secondary school where the students are separated according to ability and aptitude. Following the lower Secondary students may attend additional schooling or they may enter an apprenticeship.

During the 2010-11 school year, there were a total of 22 students attending classes in Schalunen. There were no kindergarten classes in the municipality. The municipality had 2 primary classes and 22 students. Of the primary students, 13.6% were permanent or temporary residents of Switzerland (not citizens) and 13.6% have a different mother language than the classroom language.

As of 2000, there were 4 students in Schalunen who came from another municipality, while 29 residents attended schools outside the municipality.
