= Mülchi =

- Former municipality
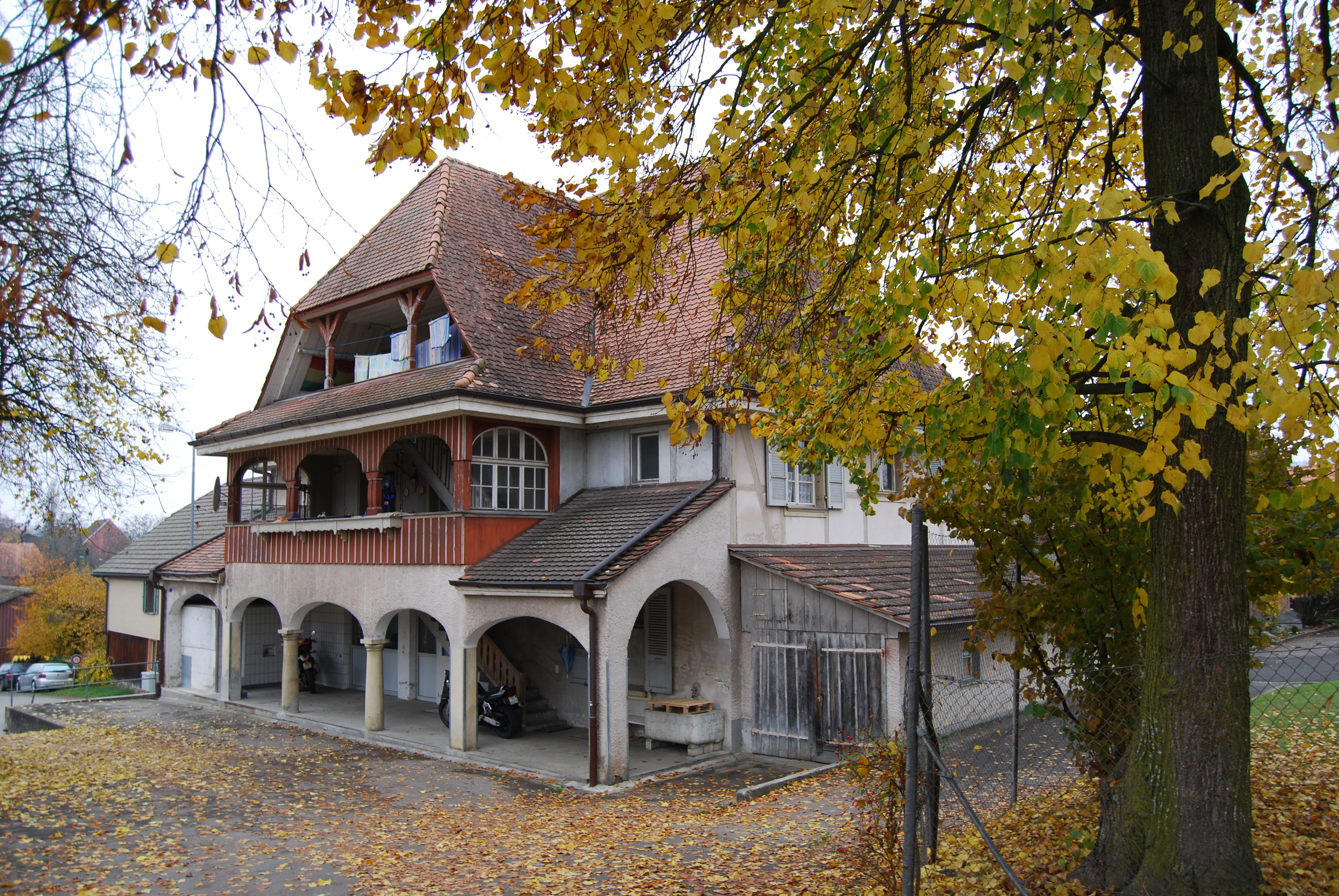
- Farm house in Mülchi village

- Flag Coat of arms
- Location of Mülchi
- Location within Switzerland Location within Canton of Bern
- Coordinates: 47°6′N 7°29′E
- Country: Switzerland
- Canton: Bern
- District: Bern-Mittelland

Area
  - Total: 3.8 km^{2} (1.5 sq mi)
- Elevation: 476 m (1,562 ft)

Population (Dec 2011)
  - Total: 233
  - Density: 61/km^{2} (160/sq mi)
- Time zone: UTC+01:00 (CET)
  - Summer (DST): UTC+02:00 (CEST)
- Postal code: 3317
- SFOS number: 545
- ISO 3166 code: CH-BE
- Surrounded by: Brunnenthal (SO), Büren zum Hof, Etzelkofen, Limpach, Messen (SO), Oberramsern (SO), Unterramsern (SO)
- Website: muelchi.ch

Mülchi is a former municipality in the Bern-Mittelland administrative district in the canton of Bern in Switzerland. On 1 January 2014 the former municipalities of Mülchi, Büren zum Hof, Etzelkofen, Grafenried, Limpach, Schalunen and Zauggenried merged into the municipality of Fraubrunnen.

== History ==
Mülchi is first mentioned in 1302 as Mulnhein.

The village was originally owned by the Count of Buchegg. During the 14th century the village and the local low court were owned by a succession of Bernese patricians including the von Greyerz, Leissigen, Esche and Stettler families. At the same time, several religious organizations owned rights or properties. In 1488 Bern acquired half of the court of Mülchi from the college of canons of the city's cathedral. The city acquired the rest of the court when the canton adopted the Protestant Reformation and secularized Interlaken Monastery. The high court over the village was in Zollikofen until 1803 when it was assigned to the court of Fraubrunnen.

The village was destroyed by a fire in 1773, but was rebuilt soon thereafter.

Mülchi has always belonged to the parish of Messen. It formed a school district with the neighboring municipalities of Etzelkofen and Limpach in 1982.

== Geography ==
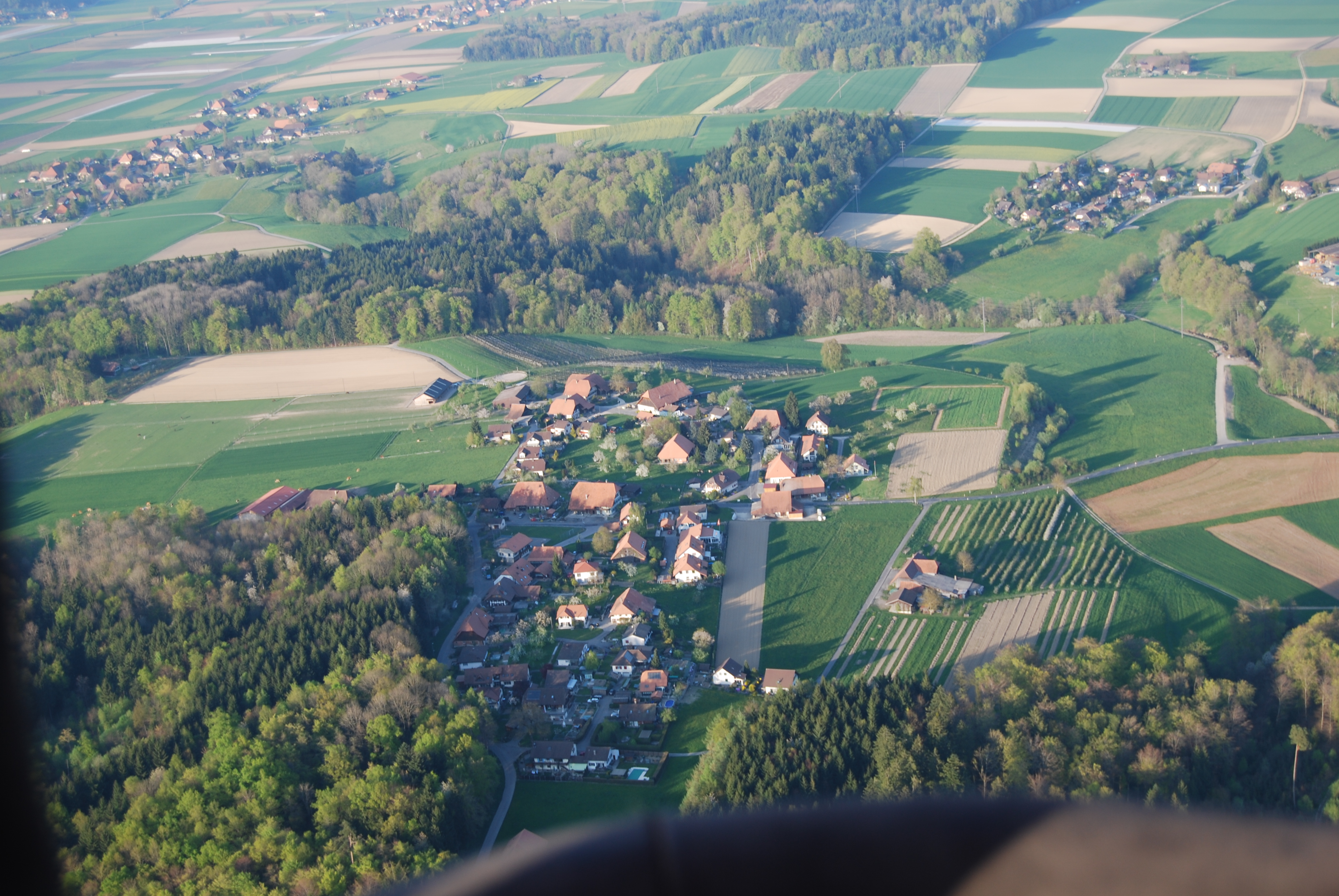
Aerial view of Brunnenthal village, Mülchi and Etzelkofen municipalities

Before the merger, Mülchi had a total area of 3.8 km^{2} (1.5 mi^{2}). Of this area, 2.94 km^{2} (1.14 mi^{2}) or 77.0% is used for agricultural purposes, while 0.67 km^{2} (0.26 mi^{2}) or 17.5% is forested. Of the rest of the land, 0.19 km^{2} (0.073 mi^{2}) or 5.0% is settled (buildings or roads), 0.02 km^{2} (4.9 acres) or 0.5% is either rivers or lakes.

Of the built up area, housing and buildings made up 2.4% and transportation infrastructure made up 2.4%. Out of the forested land, all of the forested land area is covered with heavy forests. Of the agricultural land, 66.0% is used for growing crops and 8.9% is pastures, while 2.1% is used for orchards or vine crops. All the water in the municipality is flowing water.

The village is located in the Limpach River Valley on the border of the Canton of Solothurn.

On 31 December 2009 Amtsbezirk Fraubrunnen, the municipality's former district, was dissolved. On the following day, 1 January 2010, it joined the newly created Verwaltungskreis Bern-Mittelland.

== Coat of arms ==
The blazon of the municipal coat of arms is Gules a Rose Argent barbed and seeded proper within a Border of the second.

== Demographics ==
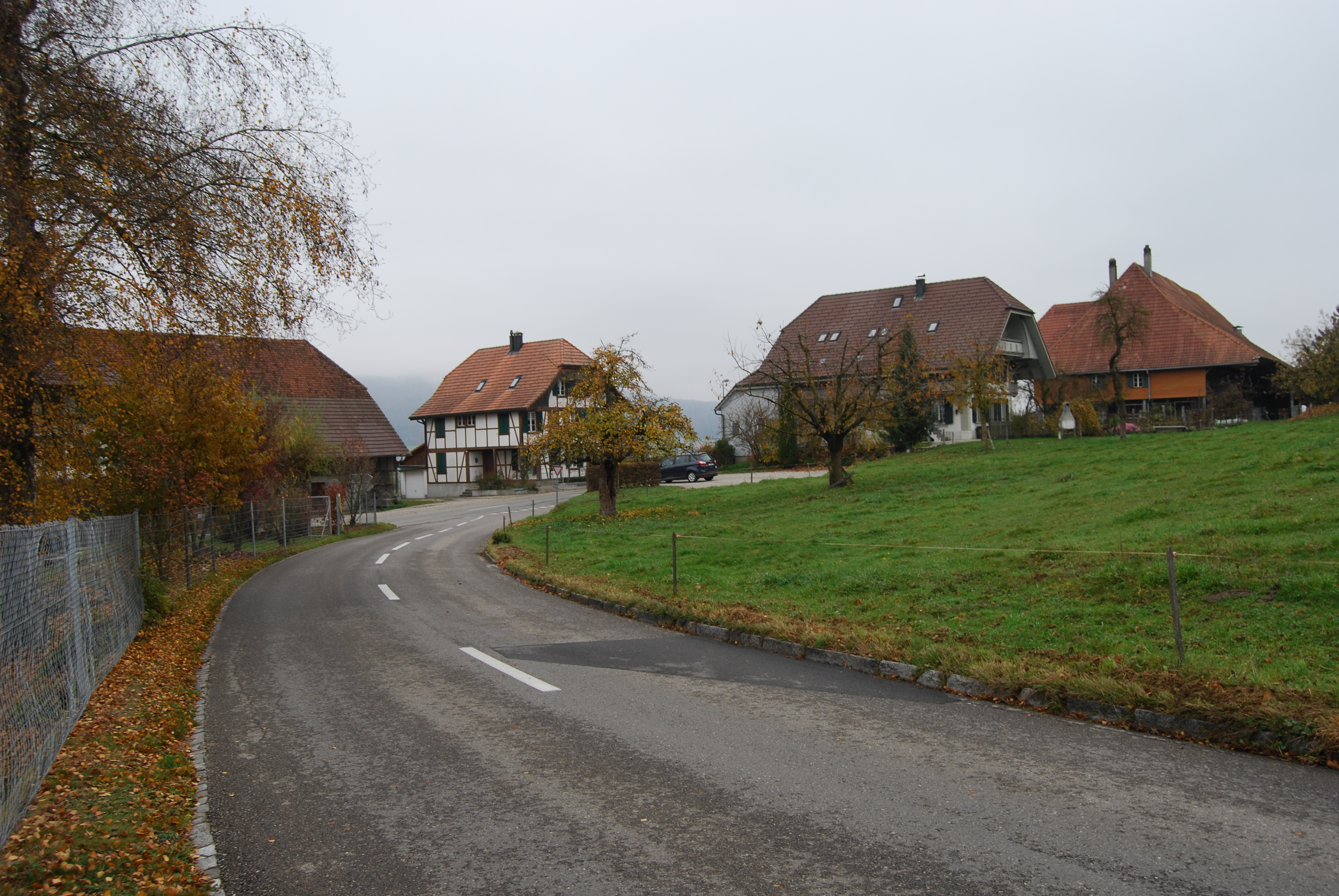
Houses in Mülchi

Mülchi had a population (as of 2011) of 233. As of 2010, 5.2% of the population are resident foreign nationals. Over the last 10 years (2000–2010) the population has changed at a rate of -10.3%. Migration accounted for -6.3%, while births and deaths accounted for 0.4%.

Most of the population (as of 2000) speaks German (235 or 95.9%) as their first language, Italian is the second most common (4 or 1.6%) and French is the third (3 or 1.2%).

As of 2008, the population was 49.6% male and 50.4% female. The population was made up of 108 Swiss men (47.0% of the population) and 6 (2.6%) non-Swiss men. There were 110 Swiss women (47.8%) and 6 (2.6%) non-Swiss women. Of the population in the municipality, 96 or about 39.2% were born in Mülchi and lived there in 2000. There were 95 or 38.8% who were born in the same canton, while 27 or 11.0% were born somewhere else in Switzerland, and 16 or 6.5% were born outside of Switzerland.

As of 2010, children and teenagers (0–19 years old) make up 24.8% of the population, while adults (20–64 years old) make up 58.3% and seniors (over 64 years old) make up 17%.

As of 2000, there were 110 people who were single and never married in the municipality. There were 112 married individuals, 15 widows or widowers and 8 individuals who are divorced.

As of 2000, there were 32 households that consist of only one person and 7 households with five or more people. In 2000, a total of 86 apartments (86.0% of the total) were permanently occupied, while 13 apartments (13.0%) were seasonally occupied and one apartment was empty.

The historical population is given in the following chart:

== Sights ==
The entire village of Mülchi is designated as part of the Inventory of Swiss Heritage Sites.

== Politics ==
In the 2011 federal election the most popular party was the Swiss People's Party (SVP) which received 60.5% of the vote. The next three most popular parties were the Conservative Democratic Party (BDP) (16.2%), the Green Liberal Party (GLP) (8.8%) and the Social Democratic Party (SP) (3.7%). In the federal election, a total of 122 votes were cast, and the voter turnout was 67.8%.

== Economy ==
As of 2011, Mülchi had an unemployment rate of 0.06%. As of 2008, there were a total of 61 people employed in the municipality. Of these, there were 50 people employed in the primary economic sector and about 18 businesses involved in this sector. 2 people were employed in the secondary sector and there was 1 business in this sector. 9 people were employed in the tertiary sector, with 6 businesses in this sector. There were 135 residents of the municipality who were employed in some capacity, of which females made up 43.7% of the workforce.

In 2008 there were a total of 41 full-time equivalent jobs. The number of jobs in the primary sector was 31, all of which were in agriculture. The number of jobs in the secondary sector was 2, all of which were in manufacturing. The number of jobs in the tertiary sector was 8. In the tertiary sector; 3 or 37.5% were in a hotel or restaurant, 1 was in the information industry, 3 or 37.5% were technical professionals or scientists, 1 was in education.

In 2000, there were 7 workers who commuted into the municipality and 96 workers who commuted away. The municipality is a net exporter of workers, with about 13.7 workers leaving the municipality for every one entering. Of the working population, 9.6% used public transportation to get to work, and 57% used a private car.

== Religion ==
From the 2000 census, 13 or 5.3% were Roman Catholic, while 214 or 87.3% belonged to the Swiss Reformed Church. Of the rest of the population, there were 6 individuals (or about 2.45% of the population) who belonged to another Christian church. There was 1 individual who was Islamic. 9 (or about 3.67% of the population) belonged to no church, are agnostic or atheist, and 5 individuals (or about 2.04% of the population) did not answer the question.

== Education ==
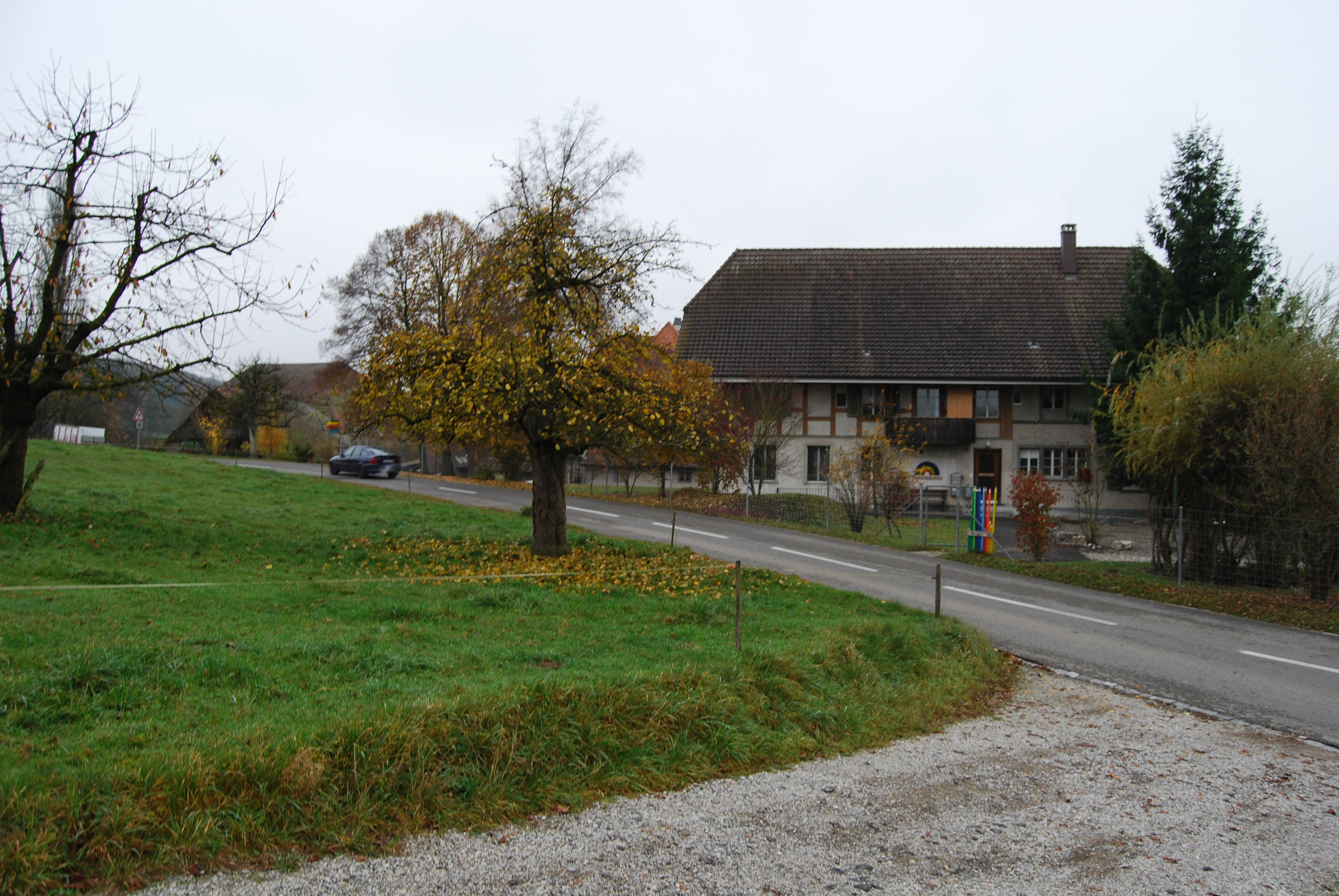
Mülchi school house

In Mülchi about 94 or (38.4%) of the population have completed non-mandatory upper secondary education, and 28 or (11.4%) have completed additional higher education (either university or a Fachhochschule). Of the 28 who completed tertiary schooling, 71.4% were Swiss men, 25.0% were Swiss women.

The Canton of Bern school system provides one year of non-obligatory Kindergarten, followed by six years of Primary school. This is followed by three years of obligatory lower Secondary school where the students are separated according to ability and aptitude. Following the lower Secondary students may attend additional schooling or they may enter an apprenticeship.

During the 2010–11 school year, there were a total of 15 students attending classes in Mülchi. There was one kindergarten class with a total of 15 students in the municipality. Of the kindergarten students, 13.3% were permanent or temporary residents of Switzerland (not citizens) and 13.3% have a different mother language than the classroom language.

As of 2000, there were 27 students in Mülchi who came from another municipality, while 31 residents attended schools outside the municipality.
