= Fraubrunnen Abbey =

Former Cistercian nunnery in Fraubrunnen, Switzerland

Coordinates: 47.084881°N 7.526482°E

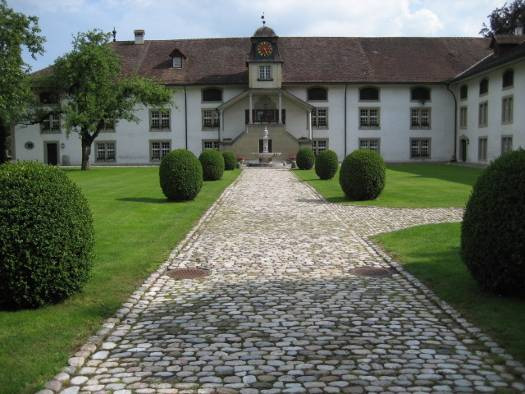
Fraubrunnen Abbey from the north

Fraubrunnen Abbey (German: Kloster Fraubrunnen; Latin: Fons beatae Mariae; in English, "spring, or well, or fountain of [Our] Lady" and "of the Blessed [Virgin] Mary" respectively) is a former Cistercian nunnery in the municipality of Fraubrunnen in the canton of Bern, Switzerland.

== History ==
In 1246, Counts Hartmann the Elder and Hartmann the Younger of Kyburg donated their lands, farms and forests in and around the village of Mülinen, as well as judicial rights over the village itself, to establish a Cistercian nunnery, which was placed under the authority of the abbot of Frienisberg in 1249 or 1250. It was called in Latin Fons beatae Mariae, in German "Fraubrunnen", which replaced the existing village's original name of "Mülinen". Over the following years it acquired further estates in a number of villages and vineyards on the shores of Lake Biel. It owned houses in Bern, Burgdorf and Solothurn and received the Burgrecht in those cities. The abbey became one of the wealthiest in the canton of Bern. The nuns generally came from families of the ministerialis class or of the burghers of Bern.

The cloister and church were damaged and rebuilt following a fire in 1280 and again after a fire in 1375.

The Kyburgs held the position and title of Kastvogt. In 1406, the city of Bern acquired the land rights and judicial rights over the territory that included the abbey. After the extinction of the Kyburg family in 1420, the position and rights of Kastvogt also passed to Bern.

With these close ties to Bern, the abbey could not escape the effects of the Protestant Reformation. Between 1481 and 1512 the city attempted to limit the power of the abbess and to regulate the community. However, when Bern adopted the Reformation in 1528 the abbey was quickly secularized and the nuns were moved out.

The vacated buildings became a castle and administrative center of the bailiwick of Fraubrunnen in the Zollikofen district. In 1535 the church and the east wing were demolished. In 1569–74 the cloister passageways were expanded and covered to become corridors in the main building. In 1647–48 the west wing was converted into a granary. The castle was pillaged by the French during the 1798 French invasion. Under the Act of Mediation in 1803 the old Vogtei was dissolved and Fraubrunnen became the seat of a district of the same name.
