= Grosshöchstetten =

- Municipality
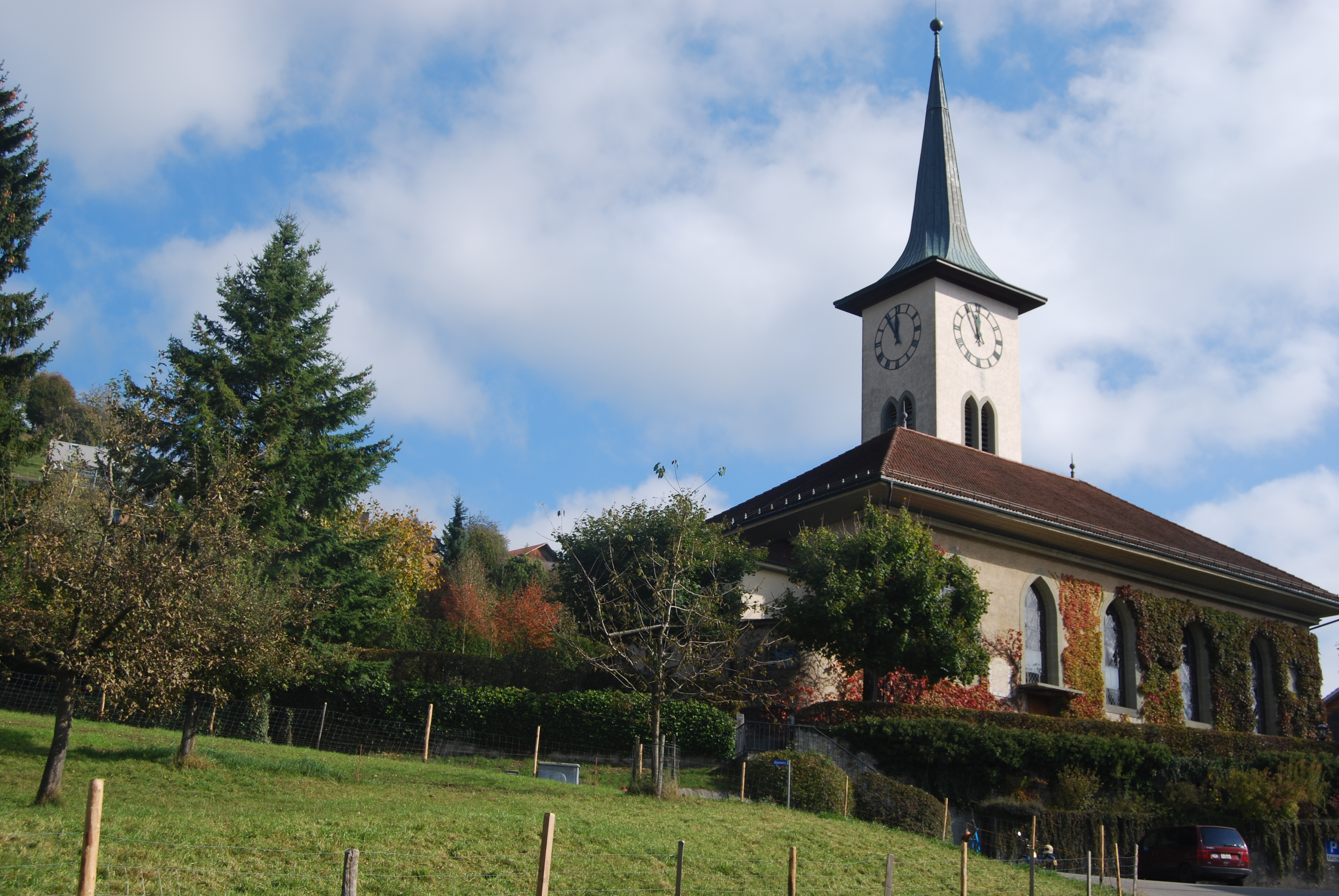

- Flag Coat of arms
- Location of Grosshöchstetten
- Location within Switzerland Location within Canton of Bern
- Coordinates: 46°54′N 7°38′E
- Country: Switzerland
- Canton: Bern
- District: Bern-Mittelland

Government
  - Executive: Gemeinderat with 7 members
  - Mayor: Gemeindepräsident; Raymond Beutler EVP/PEV (as of 2026)

Area
  - Total: 3.4 km^{2} (1.3 sq mi)
- Elevation: 745 m (2,444 ft)

Population (December 2020)
  - Total: 4,143
  - Density: 1,200/km^{2} (3,200/sq mi)
- Time zone: UTC+01:00 (CET)
  - Summer (DST): UTC+02:00 (CEST)
- Postal code: 3506
- SFOS number: 608
- ISO 3166 code: CH-BE
- Surrounded by: Arni, Biglen, Konolfingen, Mirchel, Oberthal, Schlosswil, Zäziwil
- Twin towns: Zirovnice (Czech Republic)
- Website: www.grosshoechstetten.ch

Grosshöchstetten is a municipality in the Bern-Mittelland administrative district in the canton of Bern in Switzerland. On 1 January 2018 the former municipality of Schlosswil merged into the municipality of Grosshöchstetten.

== History ==
Grosshöchstetten is first mentioned in 1146 as Honsteten. Until 1896 it was known as Höchstetten.

The oldest trace of a settlement in the area are two La Tene graves which were discovered in the Buchelhüsli and Hürnbergacker area. During the Late Middle Ages the portions of the village and surrounding fields were owned by a variety of nobles. Eventually much of the village was incorporated in the Herrschaft of Signau. The village church was first mentioned in 1230, though it was built over the foundation of an 11th-century building. After Bern adopted the Protestant Reformation in 1528, the church came under Bernese patronage. In the same year the Herrschaft of Wil acquired the village from Signau and in 1534 it was fully incorporated into Wil. The current village church was built in 1811.

The town was located at the intersection of the Bern-Lucerne and Burgdorf-Thun roads and was an important stop on these major routes. Because of its location, in 1834, Grosshöchstetten became a market town. In 1839, a dairy and cheese factory opened in the town. In 1899 the major roads were supplemented by the Burgdorf-Thun Railway, which raised Grosshöchstetten into a more important regional transportation hub. In 1830 the Konolfingen district recorder's office was moved to Grosshöchstetten where it remained for 17 years. A secondary school opened in the town in 1856 and a hospital, which became a district hospital, opened in 1879. Beginning in the 1870s craftsmen and factories began to settle in the town. In 1901 a biscuit factory opened, which remained in operation until 1970. In the 1960s a second wave of industrialization swept through the town and an anodizing factory, several appliances companies and construction companies settled in Grosshöchstetten. This second wave of industrialization caused the population to grow and many new houses were built.

== Geography ==
Grosshöchstetten has an area of 3.47 km^{2} (1.34 sq mi). Of this area, 1.96 km^{2} (0.76 mi^{2}) or 56.6% is used for agricultural purposes, while 0.62 km^{2} (0.24 mi^{2}) or 17.9% is forested. Of the rest of the land, 0.86 km^{2} (0.33 mi^{2}) or 24.9% is settled (buildings or roads).

Aerial view (1952)

Of the built up area, industrial buildings made up 2.6% of the total area while housing and buildings made up 15.0% and transportation infrastructure made up 5.2%. while parks, green belts and sports fields made up 1.7%. Out of the forested land, all of the forested land area is covered with heavy forests. Of the agricultural land, 34.1% is used for growing crops and 19.4% is pastures, while 3.2% is used for orchards or vine crops.

The municipality is located between the Aare and Emme valleys.

On 31 December 2009 Amtsbezirk Konolfingen, the municipality's former district, was dissolved. On the following day, 1 January 2010, it joined the newly created Verwaltungskreis Bern-Mittelland.

== Coat of arms ==
The blazon of the municipal coat of arms is Or a Beech Tree Vert trunked and eradicated Gules.

== Demographics ==
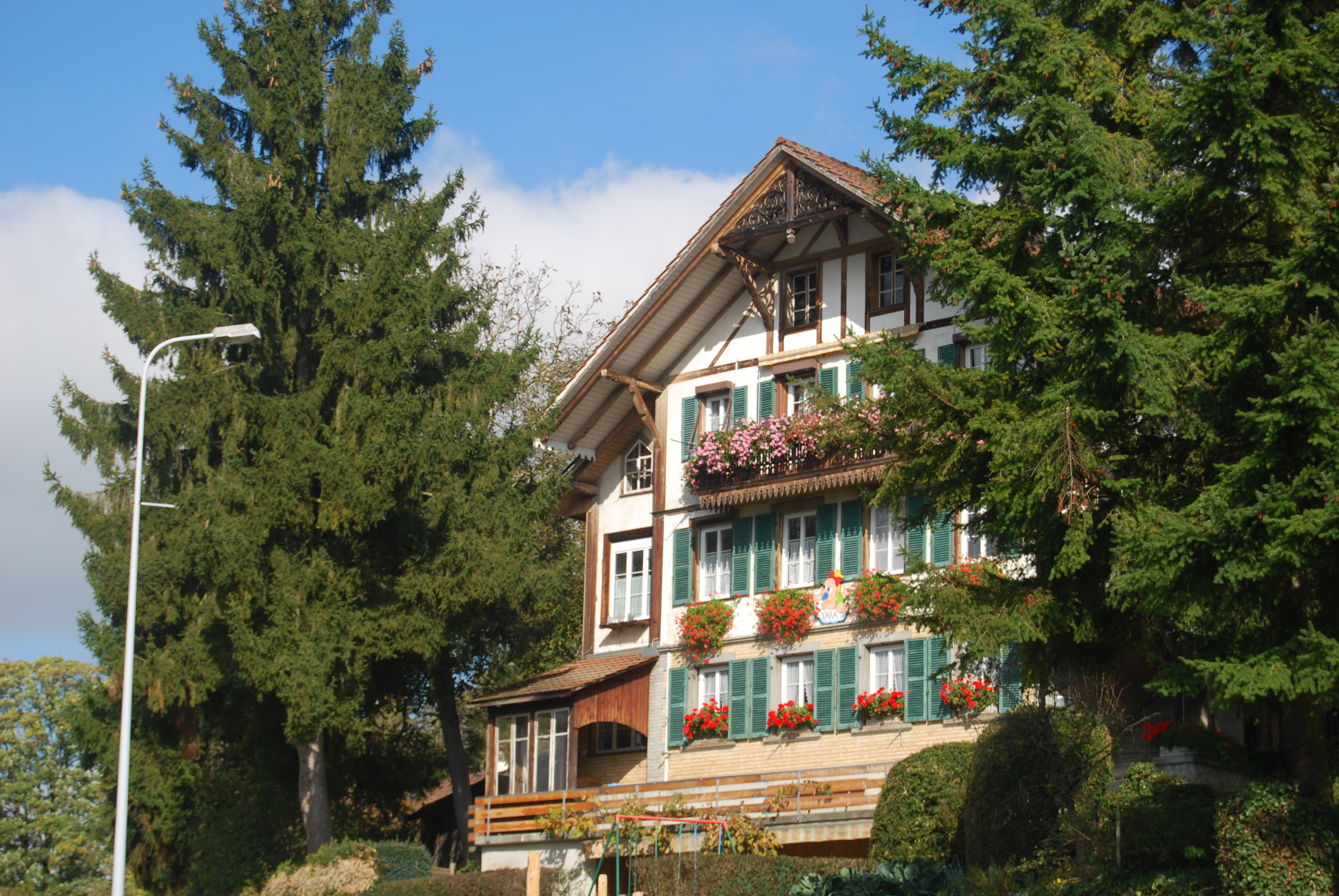
Half-timbered house in Grosshöchstetten

Grosshöchstetten has a population (as of December 2020) of 4,143. As of 2010, 8.6% of the population are resident foreign nationals. Over the last 10 years (2001-2011) the population has changed at a rate of -1.5%. Migration accounted for -2.1%, while births and deaths accounted for 0.2%.

Most of the population (as of 2000) speaks German (2,951 or 92.3%) as their first language, Italian is the second most common (62 or 1.9%) and Albanian is the third (54 or 1.7%). There are 14 people who speak French and 1 person who speaks Romansh.

As of 2008, the population was 48.8% male and 51.2% female. The population was made up of 1,446 Swiss men (44.1% of the population) and 154 (4.7%) non-Swiss men. There were 1,553 Swiss women (47.3%) and 128 (3.9%) non-Swiss women. Of the population in the municipality, 854 or about 26.7% were born in Grosshöchstetten and lived there in 2000. There were 1,583 or 49.5% who were born in the same canton, while 349 or 10.9% were born somewhere else in Switzerland, and 362 or 11.3% were born outside of Switzerland.

As of 2011, children and teenagers (0–19 years old) make up 21.5% of the population, while adults (20–64 years old) make up 59.4% and seniors (over 64 years old) make up 19.1%.

As of 2000, there were 1,296 people who were single and never married in the municipality. There were 1,585 married individuals, 198 widows or widowers and 117 individuals who are divorced.

As of 2000, there were 324 households that consist of only one person and 108 households with five or more people. In 2000, a total of 1,194 apartments (94.0% of the total) were permanently occupied, while 51 apartments (4.0%) were seasonally occupied and 25 apartments (2.0%) were empty. As of 2010, the construction rate of new housing units was 2.1 new units per 1000 residents. The vacancy rate for the municipality, in 2011, was 1.36%.

The historical population is given in the following chart:

== Heritage sites of national significance ==
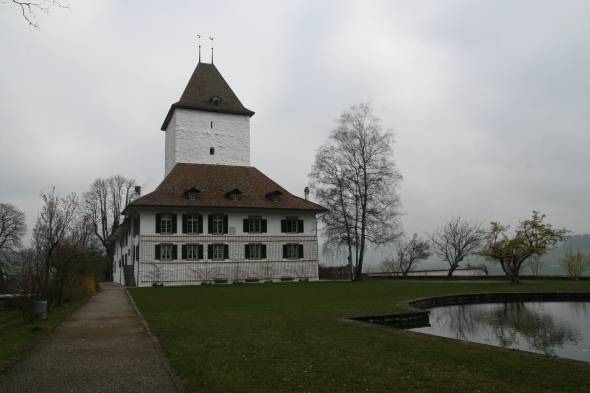
Schlosswil Castle.

Schlosswil Castle and the surrounding park are listed as Swiss heritage site of national significance.

== Politics ==
In the 2011 federal election the most popular party was the Swiss People's Party (SVP) which received 23% of the vote. The next three most popular parties were the Conservative Democratic Party (BDP) (19.8%), the Social Democratic Party (SP) (14.2%) and the FDP.The Liberals (11.2%). In the federal election, a total of 1,337 votes were cast, and the voter turnout was 54.7%.

== Economy ==
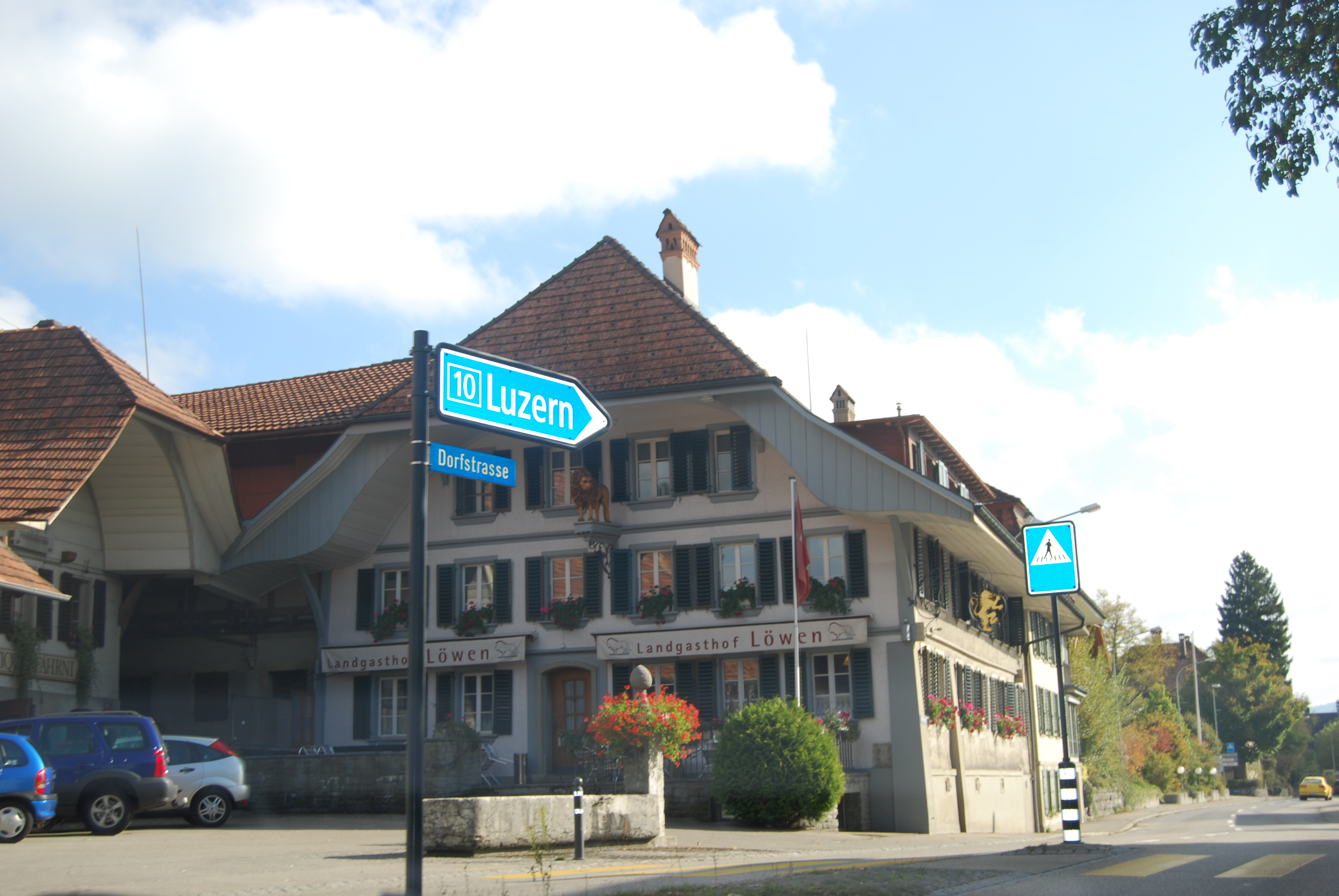
Gasthof (Hotel/Restaurant) Löwen

As of 2011, Grosshöchstetten had an unemployment rate of 1.51%. As of 2008, there were a total of 1,264 people employed in the municipality. Of these, there were 73 people employed in the primary economic sector and about 17 businesses involved in this sector. 388 people were employed in the secondary sector and there were 49 businesses in this sector. 803 people were employed in the tertiary sector, with 107 businesses in this sector. There were 1,667 residents of the municipality who were employed in some capacity, of which females made up 43.0% of the workforce.

In 2008 there were a total of 940 full-time equivalent jobs. The number of jobs in the primary sector was 37, all of which were in agriculture. The number of jobs in the secondary sector was 338 of which 195 or (57.7%) were in manufacturing and 141 (41.7%) were in construction. The number of jobs in the tertiary sector was 565. In the tertiary sector; 165 or 29.2% were in wholesale or retail sales or the repair of motor vehicles, 39 or 6.9% were in the movement and storage of goods, 46 or 8.1% were in a hotel or restaurant, 45 or 8.0% were the insurance or financial industry, 30 or 5.3% were technical professionals or scientists, 41 or 7.3% were in education and 129 or 22.8% were in health care.

In 2000, there were 655 workers who commuted into the municipality and 1,056 workers who commuted away. The municipality is a net exporter of workers, with about 1.6 workers leaving the municipality for every one entering. Of the working population, 20% used public transportation to get to work, and 49.1% used a private car.

== Religion ==
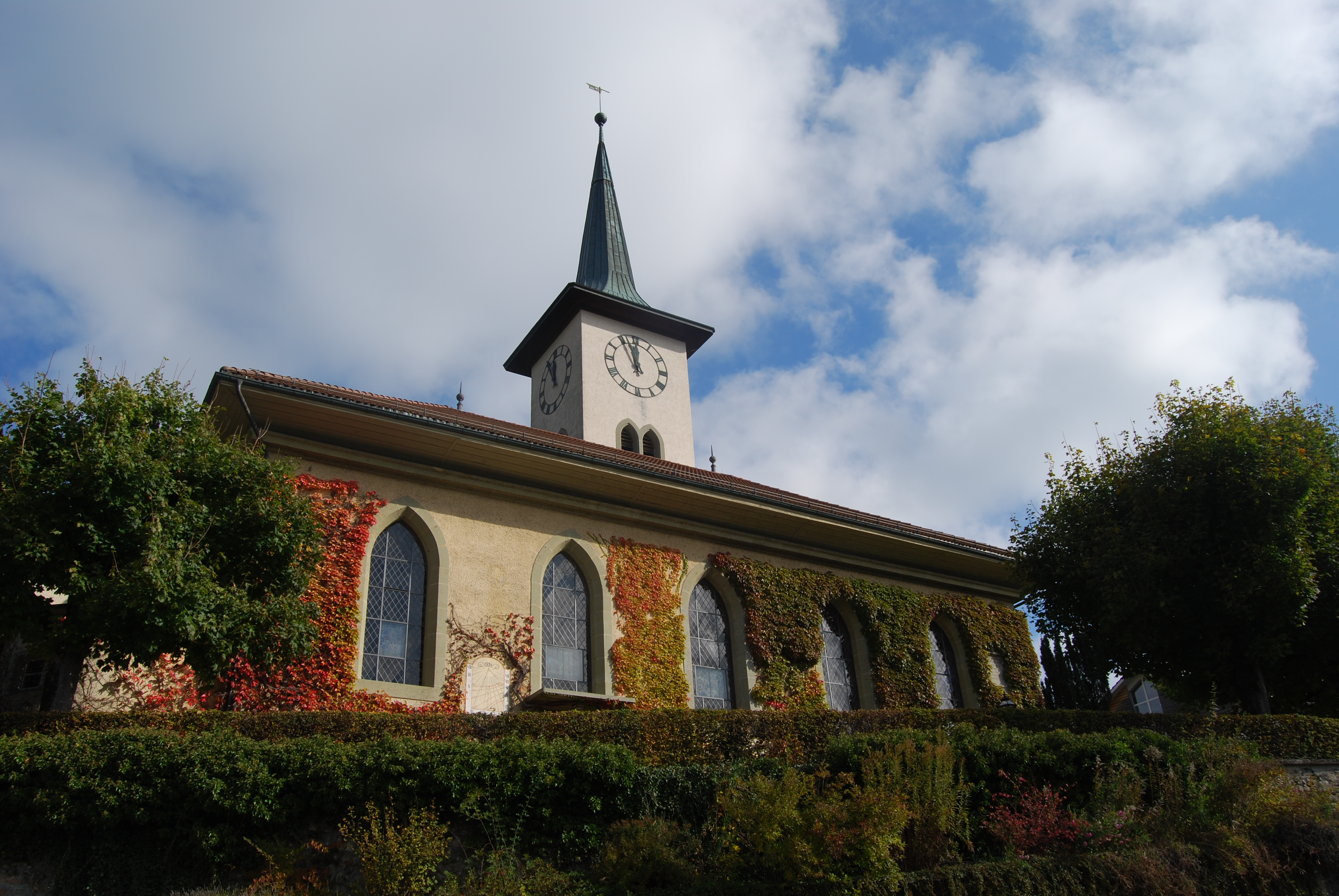
Grosshöchstetten village church

From the 2000 census, 2,252 or 70.5% belonged to the Swiss Reformed Church, while 402 or 12.6% were Roman Catholic. Of the rest of the population, there were 67 members of an Orthodox church (or about 2.10% of the population), there were 4 individuals (or about 0.13% of the population) who belonged to the Christian Catholic Church, and there were 390 individuals (or about 12.20% of the population) who belonged to another Christian church. There were 4 individuals (or about 0.13% of the population) who were Jewish, and 67 (or about 2.10% of the population) who were Islamic. There were 6 individuals who were Buddhist, 7 individuals who were Hindu and 4 individuals who belonged to another church. 105 (or about 3.29% of the population) belonged to no church, are agnostic or atheist, and 82 individuals (or about 2.57% of the population) did not answer the question.

== Climate ==
Between 1981 and 2010 Grosshöchstetten had an average of 137.9 days of rain or snow per year and on average received 1,304 mm (51.3 in) of precipitation. The wettest month was June during which time Grosshöchstetten received an average of 157 mm (6.2 in) of rain or snow. During this month there was precipitation for an average of 13 days. The month with the most days of precipitation was May, with an average of 14.1, but with only 150 mm (5.9 in) of rain or snow. The driest month of the year was February with an average of 68 mm (2.7 in) of precipitation over 9.6 days.

== Education ==
In Grosshöchstetten about 1,368 or (42.8%) of the population have completed non-mandatory upper secondary education, and 350 or (11.0%) have completed additional higher education (either university or a Fachhochschule). Of the 350 who completed tertiary schooling, 74.3% were Swiss men, 17.4% were Swiss women, 6.3% were non-Swiss men and 2.0% were non-Swiss women.

The Canton of Bern school system provides one year of non-obligatory Kindergarten, followed by six years of Primary school. This is followed by three years of obligatory lower Secondary school where the students are separated according to ability and aptitude. Following the lower Secondary students may attend additional schooling or they may enter an apprenticeship.

During the 2010–11 school year, there were a total of 438 students attending classes in Grosshöchstetten. There were 2 kindergarten classes with a total of 42 students in the municipality. Of the kindergarten students, 16.7% have a different mother language than the classroom language. The municipality had 12 primary classes and 201 students. Of the primary students, 8.0% were permanent or temporary residents of Switzerland (not citizens) and 15.9% have a different mother language than the classroom language. During the same year, there were 10 lower secondary classes with a total of 195 students. There were 4.1% who were permanent or temporary residents of Switzerland (not citizens) and 8.2% have a different mother language than the classroom language.

As of 2000, there were 108 students in Grosshöchstetten who came from another municipality, while 89 residents attended schools outside the municipality.

Grosshöchstetten is home to the Schul- und Gemeindebibliothek Grosshöchstetten (municipal library of Grosshöchstetten). The library has (as of 2008) 10,053 books or other media, and loaned out 38,053 items in the same year. It was open a total of 164 days with average of 8 hours per week during that year.

== Transportation ==
The municipality has a railway station, Grosshöchstetten, on the Burgdorf–Thun line. It has regular service to Thun, Konolfingen, and Solothurn.
