= Münsingen Castle =

Castle in Bern, Switzerland

- Schloss Münsingen
- Münsingen
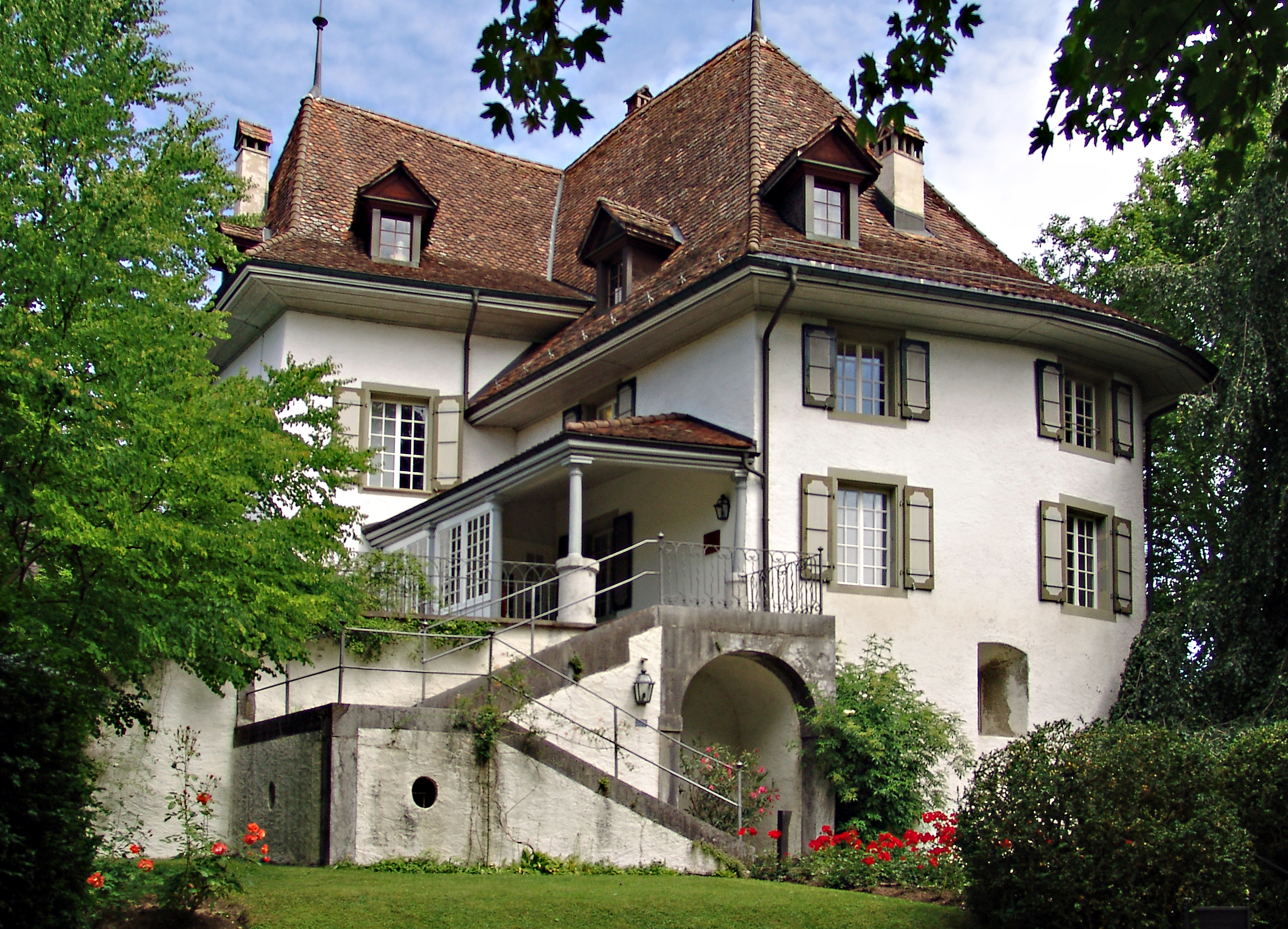
- Münsingen Castle

Site information
- Owner: Münsingen municipality
- Open to the public: yes

Location
- Coordinates: 46.875454°N 7.560106°E

Site history
- Built: 1550
- Built by: Hans Franz Nägeli

Münsingen Castle (German: Schloss Münsingen) is a castle in the municipality of Münsingen of the Canton of Bern, in Switzerland.

== History ==
By the 12th century, a castle was built in Münsingen town from which the Senn family ruled the town. However, it was demolished by Bern in 1311. A wooden outbuilding was built on the castle lands three years later, which later became the cantonal psychiatric clinic. In 1550, the Schultheiss Hans Franz Nägeli rebuilt the castle building into its current appearance. It was renovated and repaired in 1749–53. In 1977, the municipality acquired the castle and converted it into a municipal museum.

== The museum ==
The museum is open on Friday and Sunday from October until April. It contains two permanent exhibits as well as occasional temporary exhibits. The first permanent exhibit focuses on the history of the town and on the Steiger family who lived in the castle for almost three centuries, while the second permanent exhibit focuses on the work of the famous puppeteer, Therese Keller (1923-1972). She was a pioneer in the puppet theater in Switzerland.

== See also ==
- List of castles in Switzerland
