= Schlosswil =

- Former municipality
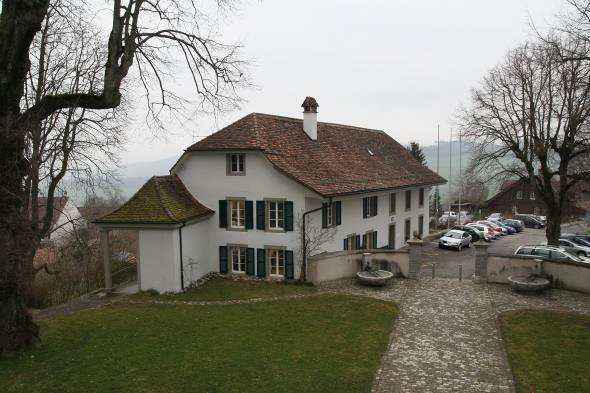
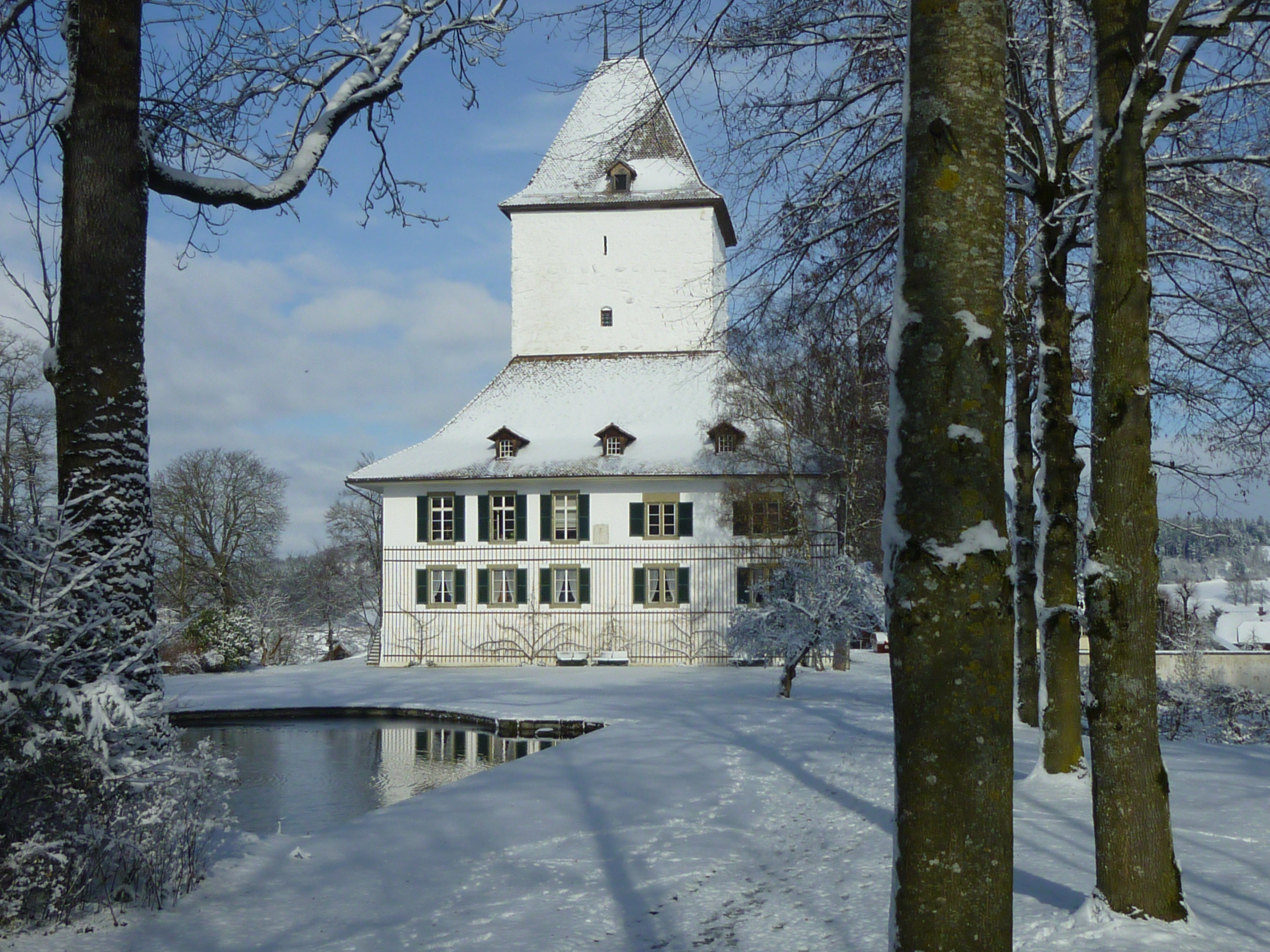
- The Amtshaus of Wil Castle Wil Castle (Schloss Wil)

- Flag Coat of arms
- Location of Schlosswil
- Location within Switzerland Location within Canton of Bern
- Coordinates: 46°55′N 7°37′E
- Country: Switzerland
- Canton: Bern
- District: Bern-Mittelland

Area
  - Total: 3.5 km^{2} (1.4 sq mi)
- Elevation: 753 m (2,470 ft)

Population (Dec 2011)
  - Total: 645
  - Density: 180/km^{2} (480/sq mi)
- Time zone: UTC+01:00 (CET)
  - Summer (DST): UTC+02:00 (CEST)
- Postal code: 3082
- SFOS number: 624
- ISO 3166 code: CH-BE
- Surrounded by: Biglen, Grosshöchstetten, Konolfingen, Trimstein, Worb
- Website: www.schlosswil.ch

Schlosswil is a former municipality in the Bern-Mittelland administrative district in the canton of Bern in Switzerland. On 1 January 2018 the former municipality of Schlosswil merged into the municipality of Grosshöchstetten.

== History ==
Schlosswil is first mentioned in 1146 as Wilare. Until 1902 it was known as Wyl.

The earliest trace of a settlement in the area include scattered Bronze Age artifacts as well as carved granite block of indeterminate age. A few Roman era artifacts have also been found near the Schlossallee street. During the Middle Ages, a fortress (German: Burg Wil) was built near the village and it became the seat of the Herrschaft of Schlosswil. The lords of the fort, the Freiherren von Wiler, were first mentioned in 1146. The von Wiler family died out around 1300, and the village and associated territory passed through several noble families including, the Freiherren von Signau and eventually the Senn von Münsingen family. The territory was split in half and passed through several Bernese patrician families until Burkhard von Erlach reunited the two halves in 1514.

In 1546 the medieval castle was destroyed in a fire. Shortly thereafter it was rebuilt as a larger castle under the direction of the master builder Niklaus von Wattenwyl-May. The current appearance comes from a 1780 renovation that gave the castle a Baroque exterior. The various noble families continued to rule over the village and Herrschaft until 1798.

The village church of St. Germanus was first mentioned in 1239. The current building dates back to 1660.

Until it was dissolved in 2010, the District of Konolfingen was administered out of the castle in Schlosswil. The district administration was one of the major employers in the municipality. However, about three-quarters of the working population commutes to jobs in Bern, Thun or other nearby cities.

== Geography ==
Aerial view (1967)

Schlosswil has an area of 3.46 km^{2} (1.34 sq mi). As of 2012, a total of 2.44 km^{2} (0.94 mi^{2}) or 70.7% is used for agricultural purposes, while 0.72 km^{2} (0.28 mi^{2}) or 20.9% is forested. Of the rest of the land, 0.31 km^{2} (0.12 mi^{2}) or 9.0% is settled (buildings or roads).

During the same year, housing and buildings made up 4.1% and transportation infrastructure made up 4.3%. Out of the forested land, 19.7% of the total land area is heavily forested and 1.2% is covered with orchards or small clusters of trees. Of the agricultural land, 54.2% is used for growing crops and 13.3% is pastures, while 3.2% is used for orchards or vine crops.

The municipality is located between the Aare and Emme river valleys. It consists of the village of Schlosswil, the settlement of Thali and the hamlets of Öli, Weiergut and Untere Mühle. Until 1980 it included the now independent municipality of Oberhünigen.

On 31 December 2009 Amtsbezirk Konolfingen, the municipality's former district, was dissolved. On the following day, 1 January 2010, it joined the newly created Verwaltungskreis Bern-Mittelland.

== Coat of arms ==
The blazon of the municipal coat of arms is Bendy of four Azure and Or.

== Demographics ==
Schlosswil has a population (as of December 2020) of 632. As of 2010, 2.7% of the population are resident foreign nationals. Over the last 10 years (2001-2011) the population has changed at a rate of -1.7%. Migration accounted for -2.7%, while births and deaths accounted for 0.5%.

Most of the population (as of 2000) speaks German (639 or 97.4%) as their first language, Serbo-Croatian is the second most common (7 or 1.1%) and French is the third (3 or 0.5%). There is 1 person who speaks Italian.

As of 2008, the population was 50.5% male and 49.5% female. The population was made up of 320 Swiss men (48.8% of the population) and 11 (1.7%) non-Swiss men. There were 318 Swiss women (48.5%) and 7 (1.1%) non-Swiss women. Of the population in the municipality, 190 or about 29.0% were born in Schlosswil and lived there in 2000. There were 336 or 51.2% who were born in the same canton, while 66 or 10.1% were born somewhere else in Switzerland, and 30 or 4.6% were born outside of Switzerland.

As of 2011, children and teenagers (0–19 years old) make up 21.4% of the population, while adults (20–64 years old) make up 61.9% and seniors (over 64 years old) make up 16.7%.

As of 2000, there were 287 people who were single and never married in the municipality. There were 327 married individuals, 18 widows or widowers and 24 individuals who are divorced.

As of 2010, there were 61 households that consist of only one person and 21 households with five or more people. In 2000, a total of 248 apartments (96.5% of the total) were permanently occupied, while 5 apartments (1.9%) were seasonally occupied and 4 apartments (1.6%) were empty. As of 2010, the construction rate of new housing units was 1.5 new units per 1000 residents. The vacancy rate for the municipality, in 2011, was 1.04%.

The historical population is given in the following chart:

== Heritage sites of national significance ==
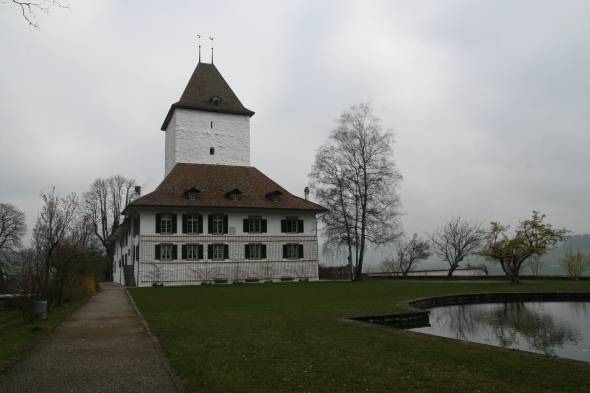
Schlosswil Castle.

The Castle and surrounding park is listed as a Swiss heritage site of national significance.

== Politics ==
In the 2011 federal election the most popular party was the Swiss People's Party (SVP) which received 32% of the vote. The next three most popular parties were the Conservative Democratic Party (BDP) (21.3%), the Social Democratic Party (SP) (13.1%) and the Green Party (9.2%). In the federal election, a total of 281 votes were cast, and the voter turnout was 54.4%.

== Economy ==
As of 2011, Schlosswil had an unemployment rate of 0.72%. As of 2008, there were a total of 197 people employed in the municipality. Of these, there were 62 people employed in the primary economic sector and about 21 businesses involved in this sector. 20 people were employed in the secondary sector and there were 5 businesses in this sector. 115 people were employed in the tertiary sector, with 17 businesses in this sector. There were 390 residents of the municipality who were employed in some capacity, of which females made up 43.6% of the workforce.

In 2008 there were a total of 149 full-time equivalent jobs. The number of jobs in the primary sector was 43, all of which were in agriculture. The number of jobs in the secondary sector was 17, all of which were in construction. The number of jobs in the tertiary sector was 89. In the tertiary sector; 2 or 2.2% were in wholesale or retail sales or the repair of motor vehicles, 15 or 16.9% were in a hotel or restaurant, 12 or 13.5% were technical professionals or scientists, 8 or 9.0% were in education.

In 2000, there were 88 workers who commuted into the municipality and 291 workers who commuted away. The municipality is a net exporter of workers, with about 3.3 workers leaving the municipality for every one entering. Of the working population, 13.8% used public transportation to get to work, and 58.7% used a private car.

== Religion ==
From the 2000 census, 511 or 77.9% belonged to the Swiss Reformed Church, while 40 or 6.1% were Roman Catholic. Of the rest of the population, there were 10 members of an Orthodox church (or about 1.52% of the population), there was 1 individual who belongs to the Christian Catholic Church, and there were 46 individuals (or about 7.01% of the population) who belonged to another Christian church. There was 1 person who was Buddhist and 2 individuals who were Hindu. 23 (or about 3.51% of the population) belonged to no church, are agnostic or atheist, and 45 individuals (or about 6.86% of the population) did not answer the question.

== Education ==
In Schlosswil about 294 or (44.8%) of the population have completed non-mandatory upper secondary education, and 86 or (13.1%) have completed additional higher education (either university or a Fachhochschule). Of the 86 who completed tertiary schooling, 70.9% were Swiss men, 25.6% were Swiss women.

The Canton of Bern school system provides one year of non-obligatory Kindergarten, followed by six years of Primary school. This is followed by three years of obligatory lower Secondary school where the students are separated according to ability and aptitude. Following the lower Secondary students may attend additional schooling or they may enter an apprenticeship.

During the 2011–12 school year, there were a total of 74 students attending classes in Schlosswil. There was one kindergarten class with a total of 20 students in the municipality. The municipality had 2 primary classes and 40 students. During the same year, there was one lower secondary class with a total of 14 students.

As of 2000, there were 7 students in Schlosswil who came from another municipality, while 36 residents attended schools outside the municipality.
