= Christian Müller (psychiatrist) =

Christian Müller (August 11, 1921, in Münsingen – March 29, 2013, in Bern) was a teacher, psychiatrist, psychoanalyst and Swiss writer from the canton de Vaud.

== See also ==
- Enquête de Lausanne
