= Trimstein =

- Former municipality
- Flag Coat of arms
- Location of Trimstein
- Location within Switzerland Location within Canton of Bern
- Coordinates: 46°54′N 7°35′E
- Country: Switzerland
- Canton: Bern
- District: Bern-Mittelland

Area
  - Total: 3.6 km^{2} (1.4 sq mi)
- Elevation: 630 m (2,070 ft)

Population (Dec 2010)
  - Total: 499
  - Density: 140/km^{2} (360/sq mi)
- Time zone: UTC+01:00 (CET)
  - Summer (DST): UTC+02:00 (CEST)
- Postal code: 3083
- SFOS number: 631
- ISO 3166 code: CH-BE
- Surrounded by: Konolfingen, Münsingen, Rubigen, Schlosswil, Worb
- Website: www.trimstein.ch

Trimstein is a former municipality in the Bern-Mittelland administrative district in the canton of Bern in Switzerland. On 1 January 2013 the former municipality of Trimstein merged into the municipality of Münsingen.

== History ==
Until 1993 Trimstein was part of Rubigen.

== Geography ==
Trimstein had an area of 3.63 km^{2} (1.40 sq mi). As of 2012, a total of 2.95 km^{2} (1.14 mi^{2}) or 81.3% is used for agricultural purposes, while 0.46 km^{2} (0.18 mi^{2}) or 12.7% is forested. Of the rest of the land, 0.23 km^{2} (0.089 mi^{2}) or 6.3% is settled (buildings or roads).

During the same year, housing and buildings made up 4.1% and transportation infrastructure made up 2.2%. Out of the forested land, all of the forested land area is covered with heavy forests. Of the agricultural land, 65.6% is used for growing crops and 12.1% is pastures, while 3.6% is used for orchards or vine crops.

The village is located on a plateau above the Aare valley.

The village of Trimstein merged on 1 January 2013 into the municipality of Münsingen.

On 31 December 2009 Amtsbezirk Konolfingen, the village's former district, was dissolved. On the following day, 1 January 2010, it joined the newly created Verwaltungskreis Bern-Mittelland.

== Coat of arms ==
The blazon of the village coat of arms is Gules three Roses Or barbed Vert and seeded of the first.

== Demographics ==
Trimstein has a population (as of December 2010) of 24. As of 2010, 2.6% of the population are resident foreign nationals. Over the last 10 years (2000-2010) the population has changed at a rate of 2.9%. Migration accounted for -3.7%, while births and deaths accounted for 6.8%.

Most of the population (as of 2000) speaks German (478 or 99.2%) as their first language with the rest speaking French

As of 2008, the population was 50.5% male and 49.5% female. The population was made up of 245 Swiss men (49.1% of the population) and 7 (1.4%) non-Swiss men. There were 241 Swiss women (48.3%) and 6 (1.2%) non-Swiss women. Of the population in the village, 148 or about 30.7% were born in Trimstein and lived there in 2000. There were 248 or 51.5% who were born in the same canton, while 60 or 12.4% were born somewhere else in Switzerland, and 12 or 2.5% were born outside of Switzerland.

As of 2010, children and teenagers (0–19 years old) make up 24.4% of the population, while adults (20–64 years old) make up 61.3% and seniors (over 64 years old) make up 14.2%.

As of 2000, there were 217 people who were single and never married in the village. There were 227 married individuals, 26 widows or widowers and 12 individuals who are divorced.

As of 2010, there were 39 households that consist of only one person and 15 households with five or more people. In 2000, a total of 178 apartments (91.3% of the total) were permanently occupied, while 10 apartments (5.1%) were seasonally occupied and 7 apartments (3.6%) were empty. As of 2010, the construction rate of new housing units was 24 new units per 1000 residents. The vacancy rate for the village, in 2011, was 0.87%.

The historical population is given in the following chart:

== Politics ==
In the 2011 federal election the most popular party was the Swiss People's Party (SVP) which received 38.4% of the vote. The next three most popular parties were the Conservative Democratic Party (BDP) (14.2%), the Social Democratic Party (SP) (14.1%) and the Green Party (9.7%). In the federal election, a total of 253 votes were cast, and the voter turnout was 65.5%.

== Economy ==
As of 2011, Trimstein had an unemployment rate of 1.05%. As of 2008, there were a total of 89 people employed in the village. Of these, there were 46 people employed in the primary economic sector and about 16 businesses involved in this sector. 21 people were employed in the secondary sector and there were 4 businesses in this sector. 22 people were employed in the tertiary sector, with 10 businesses in this sector. There were 270 residents of the village who were employed in some capacity, of which females made up 45.6% of the workforce.

In 2008 there were a total of 63 full-time equivalent jobs. The number of jobs in the primary sector was 28, all of which were in agriculture. The number of jobs in the secondary sector was 19 of which 10 or (52.6%) were in manufacturing and 9 (47.4%) were in construction. The number of jobs in the tertiary sector was 16. In the tertiary sector; 2 or 12.5% were in wholesale or retail sales or the repair of motor vehicles, 2 or 12.5% were in a hotel or restaurant, 1 was in the information industry, 2 or 12.5% were technical professionals or scientists, 5 or 31.3% were in education.

In 2000, there were 32 workers who commuted into the village and 181 workers who commuted away. A total of 89 workers (73.6% of the 121 total workers in the village) both lived and worked in Trimstein. The village is a net exporter of workers, with about 5.7 workers leaving the village for every one entering. Of the working population, 12.2% used public transportation to get to work, and 55.2% used a private car.

== Religion ==
From the 2000 census, 401 or 83.2% belonged to the Swiss Reformed Church, while 27 or 5.6% were Roman Catholic. Of the rest of the population, there was 1 member of an Orthodox church, and there were 26 individuals (or about 5.39% of the population) who belonged to another Christian church. There were 1 individual who belonged to another church. 28 (or about 5.81% of the population) belonged to no church, are agnostic or atheist, and 11 individuals (or about 2.28% of the population) did not answer the question.

== Education ==
In Trimstein about 215 or (44.6%) of the population have completed non-mandatory upper secondary education, and 67 or (13.9%) have completed additional higher education (either university or a Fachhochschule). Of the 67 who completed tertiary schooling, 61.2% were Swiss men, 34.3% were Swiss women.

The Canton of Bern school system provides one year of non-obligatory Kindergarten, followed by six years of Primary school. This is followed by three years of obligatory lower Secondary school where the students are separated according to ability and aptitude. Following the lower Secondary students may attend additional schooling or they may enter an apprenticeship.

During the 2011–12 school year, there were a total of 43 students attending classes in Trimstein. There was one kindergarten class with a total of 15 students in the village. The village had one primary class and 23 students. Of the primary students, 8.7% were permanent or temporary residents of Switzerland (not citizens). During the same year, there was one lower secondary class with a total of 5 students.

As of 2000, there were a total of 58 students attending any school in the village. Of those, 56 both lived and attended school in the village while 2 students came from another village. During the same year, 28 residents attended schools outside the village.
