= Landwirtschafts- und Haushaltungsschule Schwand-Münsingen =

Coordinates: 46.8886°N 7.5569°E

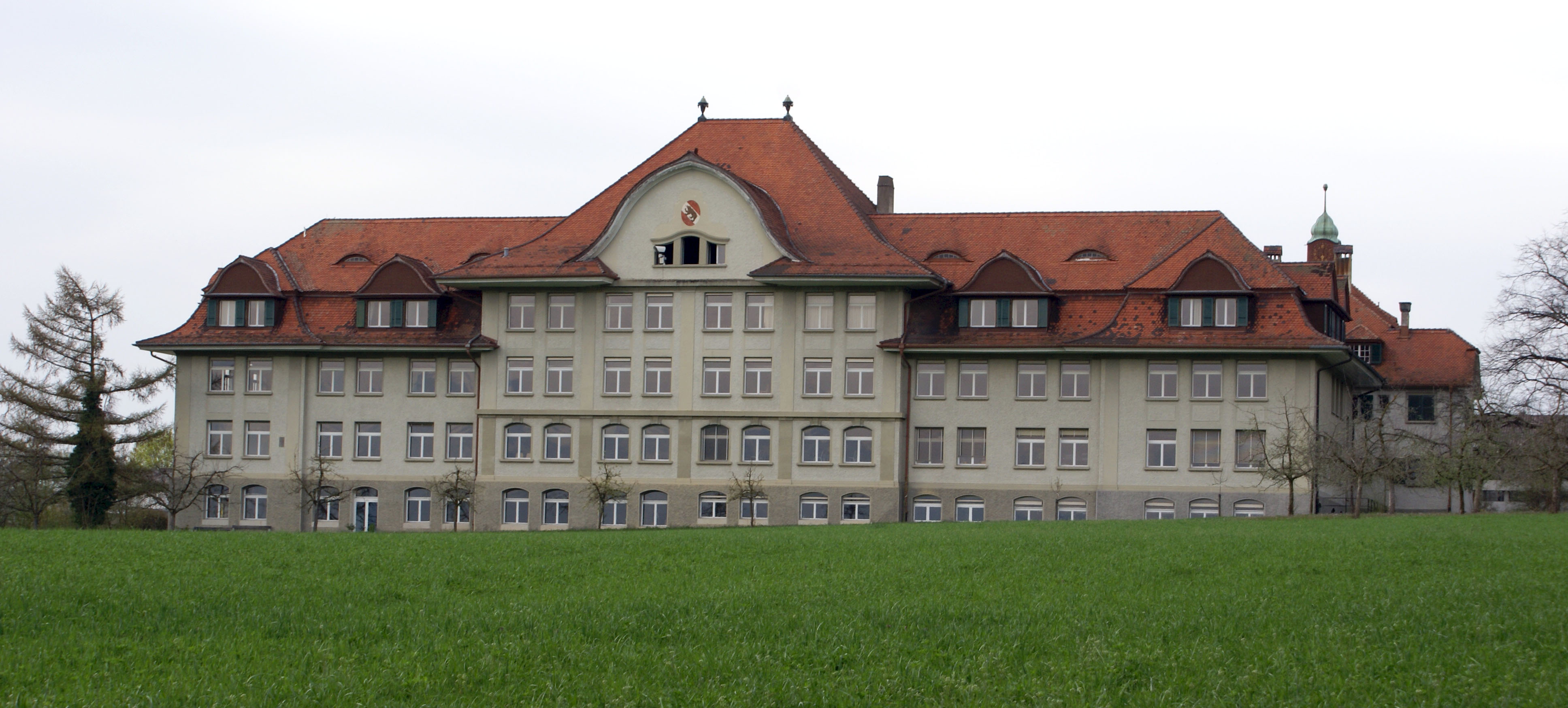
The school's main building, facing west.

The Landwirtschafts- und Haushaltungsschule Schwand-Münsingen (English: Schwand-Münsingen Agricultural and Housekeeping School) was an agricultural school on the Schwand hill in Münsingen, Switzerland.

The school was founded in 1908 by the authorities of the canton of Bern as a branch of the Rütti agricultural school. During the 1930s and 1940s in particular, it was an agricultural research and training center of national importance under the direction of Werner Daepp. In 1945, the school issued the first Meisterlandwirt (master farmer) diplomas in Switzerland. Its name was later changed to Landwirtschaftliches Bildungs- und Beratungszentrum Schwand and then to Inforama Schwand.

It was closed in 2005 as a consequence of the constantly declining number of student farmers. The buildings have since been used by the cantonal administration; a number of projects to reuse them as a private university campus or as an organic farming training center have failed.

The campus is listed as a heritage site of national significance in the November 2008 review draft of the Swiss Inventory of Cultural Property of National and Regional Significance.
