= Rubigen =

- Municipality
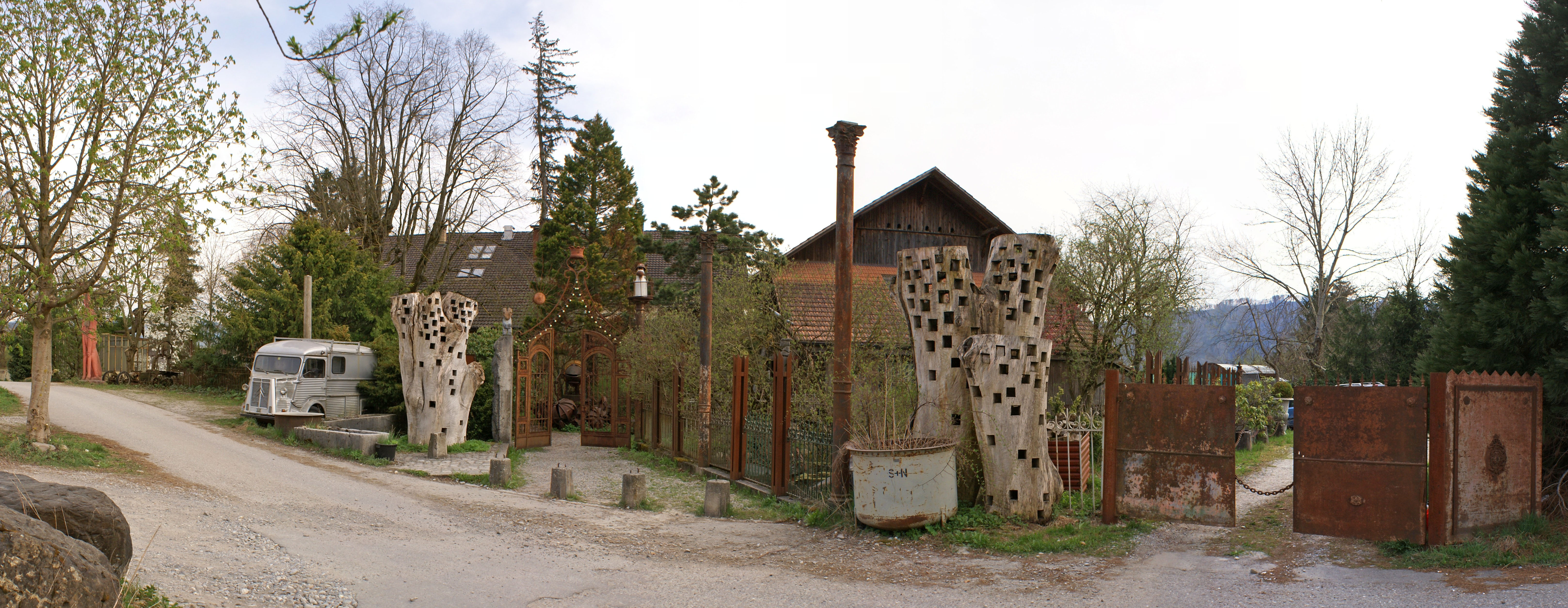

- Flag Coat of arms
- Location of Rubigen
- Location within Switzerland Location within Canton of Bern
- Coordinates: 46°54′N 7°33′E
- Country: Switzerland
- Canton: Bern
- District: Bern-Mittelland

Government
  - Executive: Gemeinderat with 7 members
  - Mayor: Gemeindepräsident(in); Armanda Bula Mitte (as of 2026)

Area
  - Total: 7.0 km^{2} (2.7 sq mi)
- Elevation: 549 m (1,801 ft)

Population (December 2020)
  - Total: 2,892
  - Density: 410/km^{2} (1,100/sq mi)
- Time zone: UTC+01:00 (CET)
  - Summer (DST): UTC+02:00 (CEST)
- Postal code: 3113
- SFOS number: 623
- ISO 3166 code: CH-BE
- Surrounded by: Allmendingen, Belp, Münsingen, Trimstein, Worb
- Website: https://www.rubigen.swiss/

Rubigen is a municipality in the Bern-Mittelland administrative district in the canton of Bern in Switzerland.

== History ==
Rubigen is first mentioned in 1267 as Rubingen.

The oldest traces of a settlement in the area include scattered neolithic and Bronze Age items and La Tene tombs. The remains of a Roman era fountain and an early medieval cemetery have also been found. During the Middle Ages, the village was part of the Herrschaft of Münsingen. The rulers of Münsingen built a fort near the village around 1278. Very little is known of the history of the fort, but it fell into ruins was demolished in 1798. During the 15th century, the village broke away from the Herrschaft and in the following century it became subject to the city of Bern. Due to its proximity to the city Bernese patricians built their summer homes in the area.

The hamlet of Beitenwil was first mentioned in 1328 as Beitenwile. It was originally owned by Fraubrunnen Abbey. However, in 1473, it was acquired by the Herrschaft of Worb and was combined with Trimstein. In 1834 the three school districts of Rubigen, Allmendingen and Trimstein merged to form the political municipality of Rubigen. These three would remain politically united until 1993.

The roads and fields around the village were often damaged when the Aare river flooded. The Jura water correction projects of 1824-31 finally controlled the river and allowed the villages to expand their infrastructure. The Hunzigen bridge was built in 1836 to replace several ferries. Despite the improved roads and the bridge, the villages remained generally small and rural. Even the completion of a train station on the Bern-Thun railroad in 1859 did not lead to growth. The municipality's population only began to grow in the 1960s. The completion of the A6 motorway in 1973 encouraged further growth. Today many of the residents of the municipality commute to jobs in nearby cities.

== Geography ==
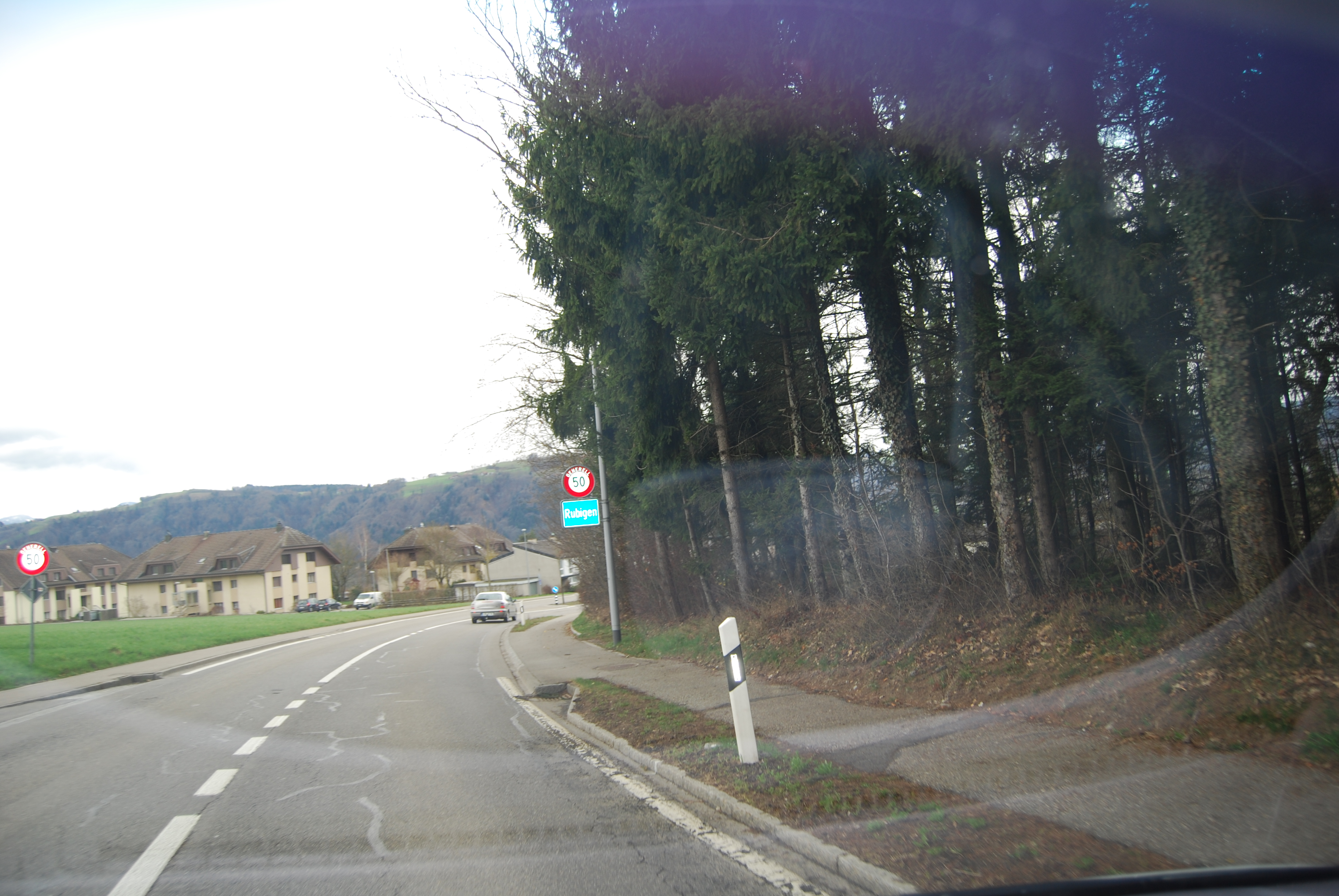
A sign at the entrance to the municipality

Rubigen has an area of 6.92 km^{2} (2.67 sq mi). As of 2012, a total of 3.74 km^{2} (1.44 mi^{2}) or 54.0% is used for agricultural purposes, while 1.38 km^{2} (0.53 mi^{2}) or 19.9% is forested. Of the rest of the land, 1.46 km^{2} (0.56 mi^{2}) or 21.1% is settled (buildings or roads), 0.21 km^{2} (0.081 mi^{2}) or 3.0% is either rivers or lakes and 0.2 km^{2} (0.077 mi^{2}) or 2.9% is unproductive land.

During the same year, industrial buildings made up 2.5% of the total area while housing and buildings made up 8.5% and transportation infrastructure made up 7.9%. Power and water infrastructure as well as other special developed areas made up 1.7% of the area Out of the forested land, all of the forested land area is covered with heavy forests. Of the agricultural land, 45.3% is used for growing crops and 7.2% is pastures, while 1.4% is used for orchards or vine crops. Of the water in the municipality, 0.7% is in lakes and 2.3% is in rivers and streams.

The municipality is located in the Aaretal (Aare Valley) and includes the village of Rubigen, the hamlets of Beitenwil, Kleinhöchstetten and Hunzigen as well as a number of individual farm houses. Until 1992 it also included the sections of Allmendingen and Trimstein, however they became independent municipalities in 1993.

On 31 December 2009 Amtsbezirk Konolfingen, the municipality's former district, was dissolved. On the following day, 1 January 2010, it joined the newly created Verwaltungskreis Bern-Mittelland.

== Coat of arms ==
The blazon of the municipal coat of arms is Sable a Pale and a chief Or and on the last three Roses Gules barbed and seeded proper.

== Demographics ==
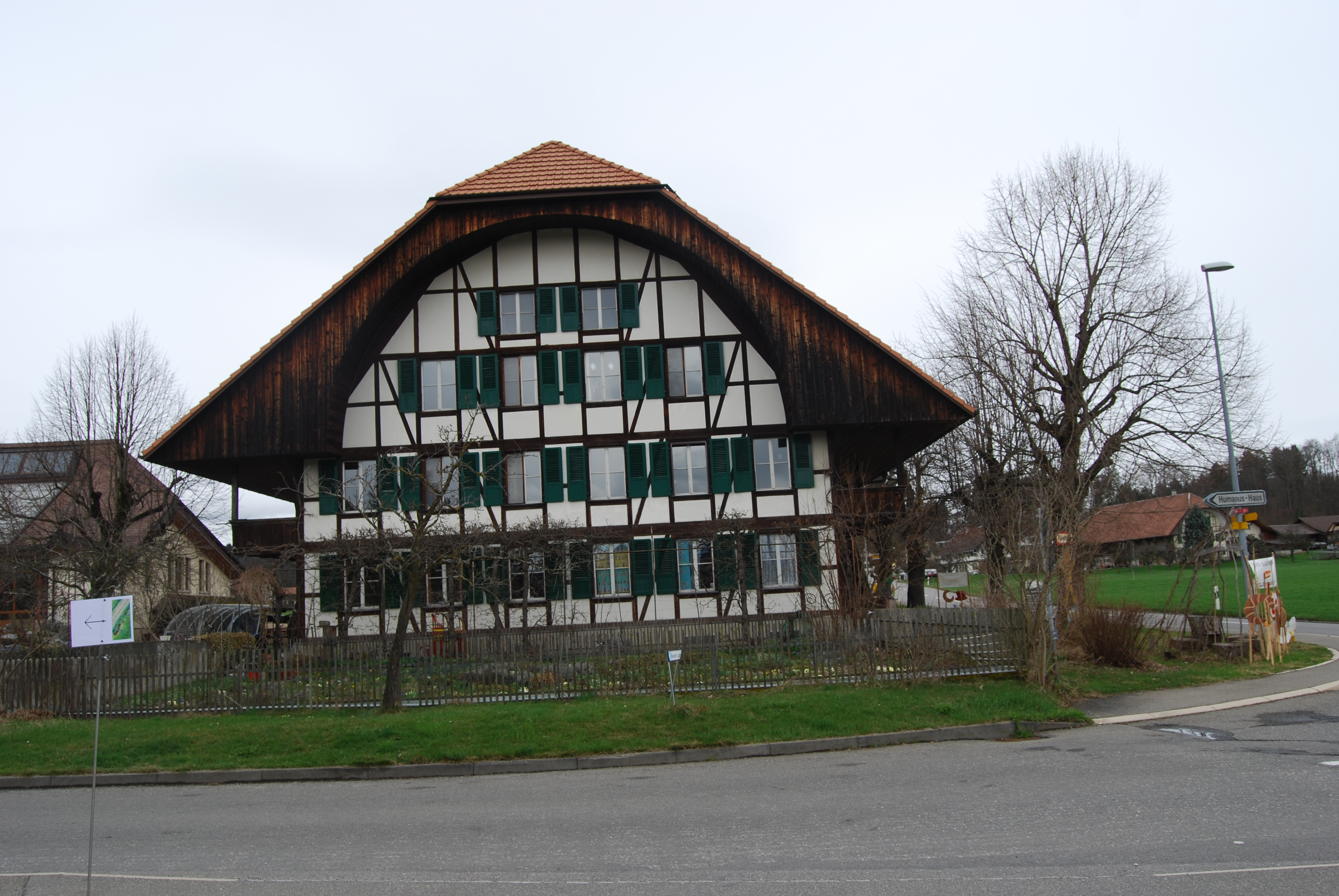
Half-timbered house in Rubigen

Rubigen has a population (as of December 2020) of 2,892. As of 2010, 7.5% of the population are resident foreign nationals. Over the last 10 years (2001-2011) the population has changed at a rate of -0.1%. Migration accounted for -0.6%, while births and deaths accounted for 0.5%.

Most of the population (as of 2000) speaks German (2,296 or 91.8%) as their first language, French is the second most common (39 or 1.6%) and Italian is the third (33 or 1.3%). There is 1 person who speaks Romansh.

As of 2008, the population was 49.5% male and 50.5% female. The population was made up of 1,320 Swiss men (46.1% of the population) and 98 (3.4%) non-Swiss men. There were 1,331 Swiss women (46.5%) and 116 (4.0%) non-Swiss women. Of the population in the municipality, 429 or about 17.1% were born in Rubigen and lived there in 2000. There were 1,287 or 51.4% who were born in the same canton, while 438 or 17.5% were born somewhere else in Switzerland, and 268 or 10.7% were born outside of Switzerland.

As of 2011, children and teenagers (0–19 years old) make up 20.1% of the population, while adults (20–64 years old) make up 64.3% and seniors (over 64 years old) make up 15.7%.

As of 2000, there were 1,077 people who were single and never married in the municipality. There were 1,183 married individuals, 119 widows or widowers and 123 individuals who are divorced.

As of 2010, there were 357 households that consist of only one person and 55 households with five or more people. In 2000, a total of 966 apartments (92.1% of the total) were permanently occupied, while 62 apartments (5.9%) were seasonally occupied and 21 apartments (2.0%) were empty. As of 2010, the construction rate of new housing units was 0.7 new units per 1000 residents. The vacancy rate for the municipality, in 2011, was 1.42%.

The historical population is given in the following chart:

== Sights ==
The entire hamlet of Kleinhöchstetten is designated as part of the Inventory of Swiss Heritage Sites.

== Politics ==
In the 2011 federal election the most popular party was the Swiss People's Party (SVP) which received 22.3% of the vote. The next three most popular parties were the Social Democratic Party (SP) (20.6%), the Conservative Democratic Party (BDP) (19.4%) and the Green Party (9.1%). In the federal election, a total of 1,201 votes were cast, and the voter turnout was 55.3%.

== Economy ==
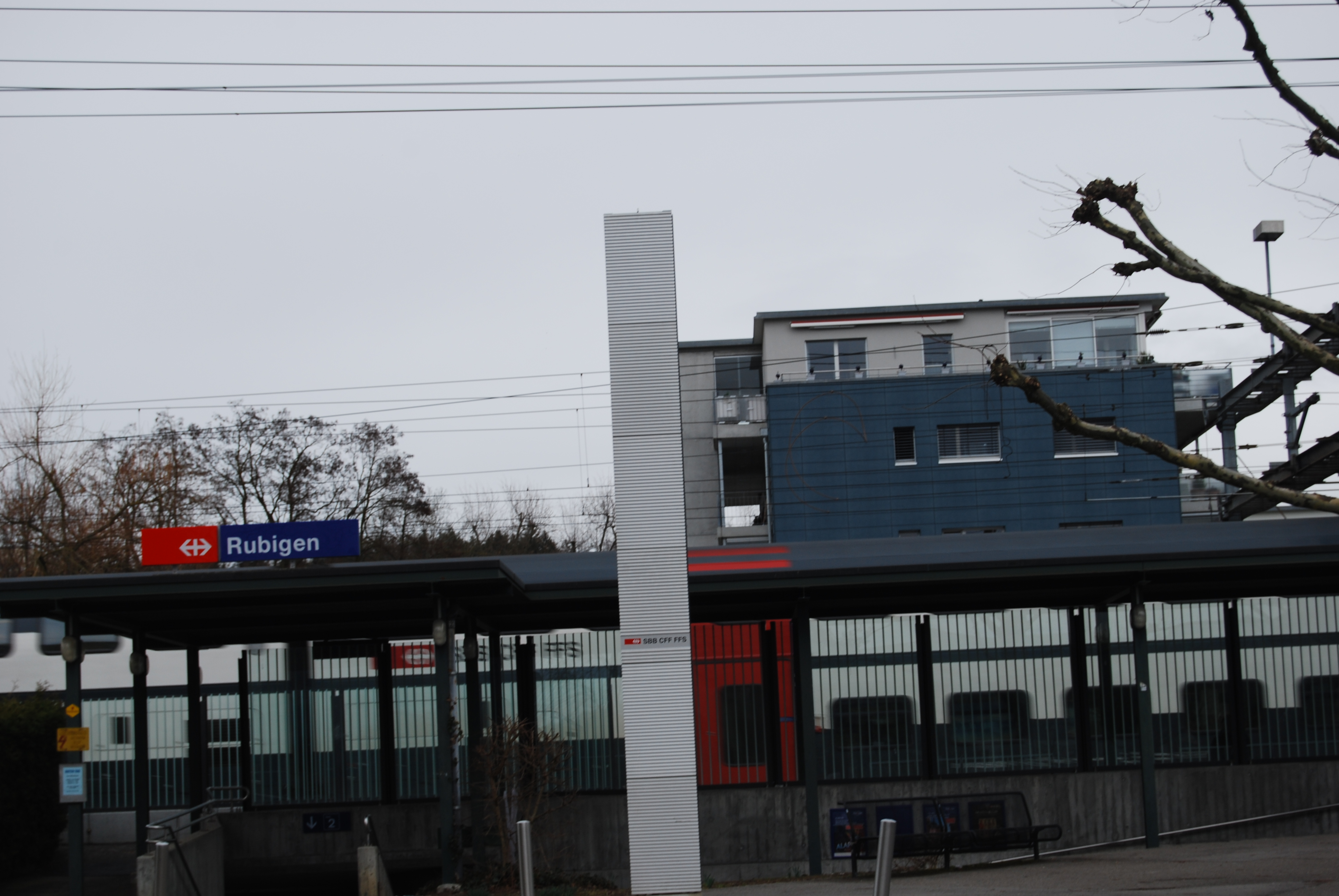
Rubigen train station

As of 2011, Rubigen had an unemployment rate of 1.38%. As of 2008, there were a total of 923 people employed in the municipality. Of these, there were 63 people employed in the primary economic sector and about 21 businesses involved in this sector. 375 people were employed in the secondary sector and there were 25 businesses in this sector. 485 people were employed in the tertiary sector, with 71 businesses in this sector. There were 1,456 residents of the municipality who were employed in some capacity, of which females made up 45.1% of the workforce.

In 2008 there were a total of 752 full-time equivalent jobs. The number of jobs in the primary sector was 42, of which 38 were in agriculture and 4 were in fishing or fisheries. The number of jobs in the secondary sector was 358 of which 189 or (52.8%) were in manufacturing, 91 or (25.4%) were in mining and 67 (18.7%) were in construction. The number of jobs in the tertiary sector was 352. In the tertiary sector; 91 or 25.9% were in wholesale or retail sales or the repair of motor vehicles, 4 or 1.1% were in the movement and storage of goods, 15 or 4.3% were in a hotel or restaurant, 8 or 2.3% were in the information industry, 10 or 2.8% were the insurance or financial industry, 22 or 6.3% were technical professionals or scientists, 21 or 6.0% were in education and 142 or 40.3% were in health care.

In 2000, there were 494 workers who commuted into the municipality and 1,129 workers who commuted away. The municipality is a net exporter of workers, with about 2.3 workers leaving the municipality for every one entering. Of the working population, 31.9% used public transportation to get to work, and 45.1% used a private car.

== Religion ==
From the 2000 census, 1,697 or 67.8% belonged to the Swiss Reformed Church, while 330 or 13.2% were Roman Catholic. Of the rest of the population, there were 20 members of an Orthodox church (or about 0.80% of the population), there were 2 individuals (or about 0.08% of the population) who belonged to the Christian Catholic Church, and there were 200 individuals (or about 7.99% of the population) who belonged to another Christian church. There were 2 individuals (or about 0.08% of the population) who were Jewish, and 29 (or about 1.16% of the population) who were Islamic. There were 7 individuals who were Buddhist and 15 individuals who were Hindu. 235 (or about 9.39% of the population) belonged to no church, are agnostic or atheist, and 61 individuals (or about 2.44% of the population) did not answer the question.

== Education ==
In Rubigen about 1,111 or (44.4%) of the population have completed non-mandatory upper secondary education, and 410 or (16.4%) have completed additional higher education (either university or a Fachhochschule). Of the 410 who completed tertiary schooling, 67.6% were Swiss men, 25.4% were Swiss women, 3.9% were non-Swiss men and 3.2% were non-Swiss women.

The Canton of Bern school system provides one year of non-obligatory Kindergarten, followed by six years of Primary school. This is followed by three years of obligatory lower Secondary school where the students are separated according to ability and aptitude. Following the lower Secondary students may attend additional schooling or they may enter an apprenticeship.

During the 2011–12 school year, there were a total of 215 students attending classes in Rubigen. There were 4 kindergarten classes with a total of 65 students in the municipality. Of the kindergarten students, 9.2% were permanent or temporary residents of Switzerland (not citizens) and 7.7% have a different mother language than the classroom language. The municipality had 8 primary classes and 150 students. Of the primary students, 9.3% were permanent or temporary residents of Switzerland (not citizens) and 13.3% have a different mother language than the classroom language.

As of 2000, there were 4 students in Rubigen who came from another municipality, while 153 residents attended schools outside the municipality.

Rubigen is home to the Schul- und Gemeindebibliothek Rubigen (municipal library of Rubigen). The library has (as of 2008) 7,992 books or other media, and loaned out 27,040 items in the same year. It was open a total of 153 days with average of 5.5 hours per week during that year.
