= Münsingen =

- Municipality
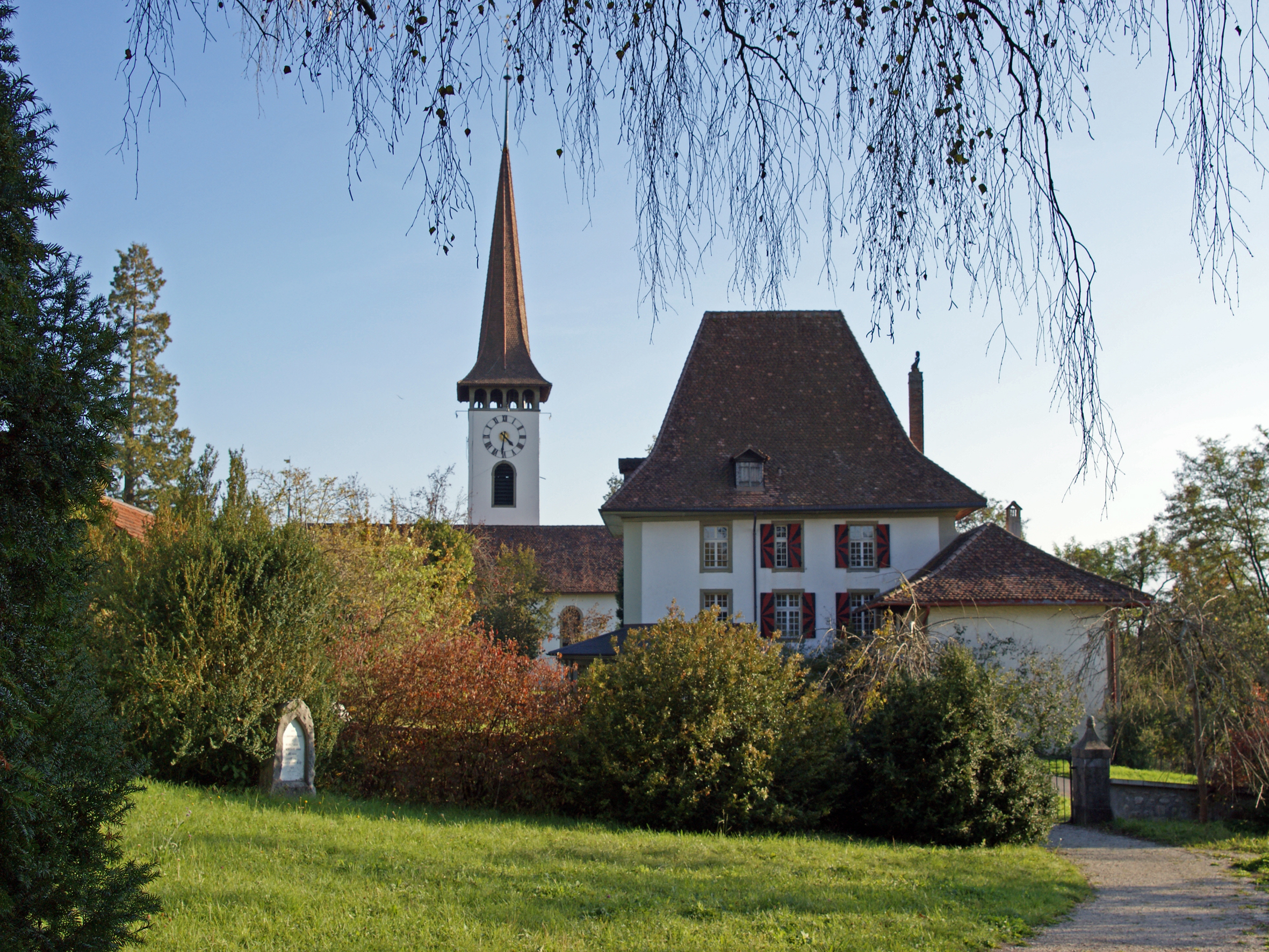
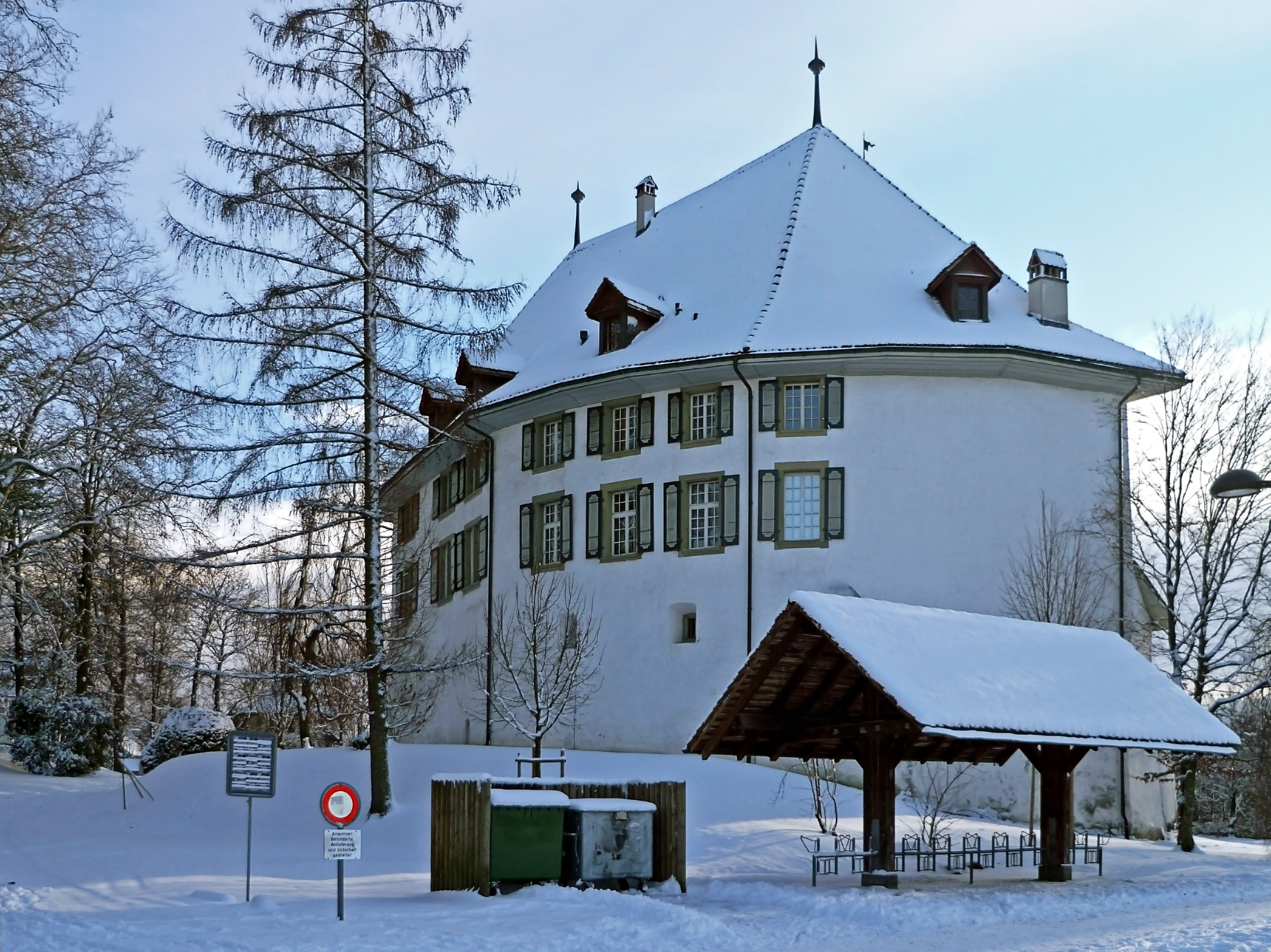
- Münsingen rectory building Münsingen Castle

- Flag Coat of arms
- Location of Münsingen
- Location within Switzerland Location within Canton of Bern
- Coordinates: 46°52′N 7°34′E
- Country: Switzerland
- Canton: Bern
- District: Bern-Mittelland

Government
  - Executive: Gemeinderat with 7 members
  - Mayor: Gemeindepräsident; Stefanie Feller (as of 2026)
  - Parliament: Gemeindeparlament with 30 members

Area
  - Total: 8.5 km^{2} (3.3 sq mi)
- Elevation: 541 m (1,775 ft)

Population (December 2020)
  - Total: 12,966
  - Density: 1,500/km^{2} (4,000/sq mi)
- Time zone: UTC+01:00 (CET)
  - Summer (DST): UTC+02:00 (CEST)
- Postal code: 3110
- SFOS number: 616
- ISO 3166 code: CH-BE
- Surrounded by: Belp, Gerzensee, Konolfingen, Rubigen, Tägertschi, Trimstein, Wichtrach
- Twin towns: Humpolec (Czech Republic)
- Website: www.muensingen.ch

Münsingen (German pronunciation: [ˈmʏnzɪŋən]; Highest Alemannic: Münsige) is a municipality in the Bern-Mittelland administrative district in the canton of Bern in Switzerland. On 1 January 2013 the former municipality of Trimstein merged into Münsingen, and on 1 January 2017 the former municipality of Tägertschi also merged.

The village lies on the River Aare between the cities of Bern and Thun.

== History ==
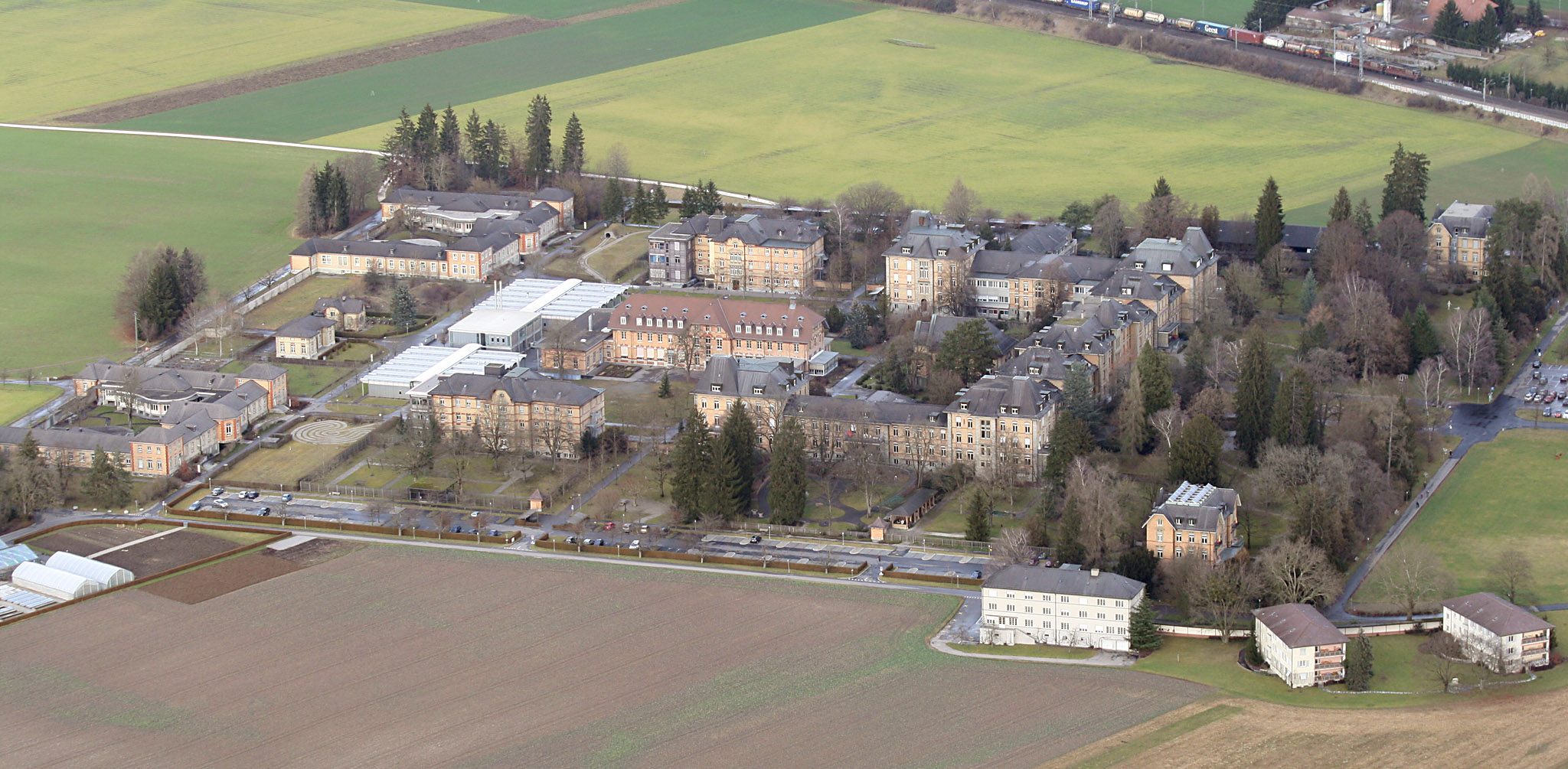
Münsingen psychiatric clinic today.

Aerial view from 400 m by Walter Mittelholzer (1925)

Münsingen developed from a Celtic village first settled in around 400 BC. The origin of the name is unclear, though attributed to the Alamanni. During the early and middle La Tene era the residents of the village built about 220 tombs along the Aare river. Some of the men were buried with their weapons and the women and children were buried with jewelry. A total of 1,200 items were discovered from the village. The rich collection of artifacts and the clear stratigraphic layers at Münsingen have helped archeologists to develop a model for dating isolated graves from Germany to Romania to Italy. The relatively small number of individuals combined with the rich grave goods indicate that the settlement at Münsingen was home to Celtic nobility. Two of the graves contain skulls that show evidence of trepanation or holes bored into the skull.

During the Roman era there was a country estate or very small settlement near where the village church stands today. Scattered fragments of a wall and a bath house have been discovered. The bath house floor was decorated with mosaics depicting fishes and the god Oceanus. The bath house is probably from the 2nd century AD.

Münsingen is first mentioned between 993 and 1010 as Munisingam when King Rudolph III of Burgundy granted it to Count Kuno. It passed through the hands of the Kyburgs and the Zähringens. Then, in the 13th and 14th centuries Münsingen came under the lordship of the Senn knights from whom the present arms of the municipality are derived. In 1377, the last member of the family sold the town to a wealthy family in Bern. It passed through several families before the city of Bern gradually acquired all the rights to the town.

As an important gathering-place during the Peasants' War, and in the ensuing process of democratization, Münsingen played a major part in the history of the canton of Bern.

Originally, the town was ruled from a castle located on the heights above the Müli valley. However, this building fell into ruin and little is known about it. By the 12th century another castle was built in Münsingen town. The Senn family ruled the town from this castle. However, it was demolished by Bern in 1311. A wooden outbuilding was built on the castle lands three years later, in 1314. In 1550 the Schultheiss Hans Franz Nägeli rebuilt the castle building into Münsingen Castle. It was renovated and repaired in 1749–53. In 1977 the municipality acquired the castle and converted it into a municipal museum. The wooden outbuilding was rebuilt in 1570 into a country estate house by the Schultheiss Johannes Steiger. It was purchased in 1877 by the Canton of Bern and converted into a cantonal psychiatric clinic. The clinic played an important role in the 1930s in introducing the somatic therapies in psychiatry.

== Geography ==
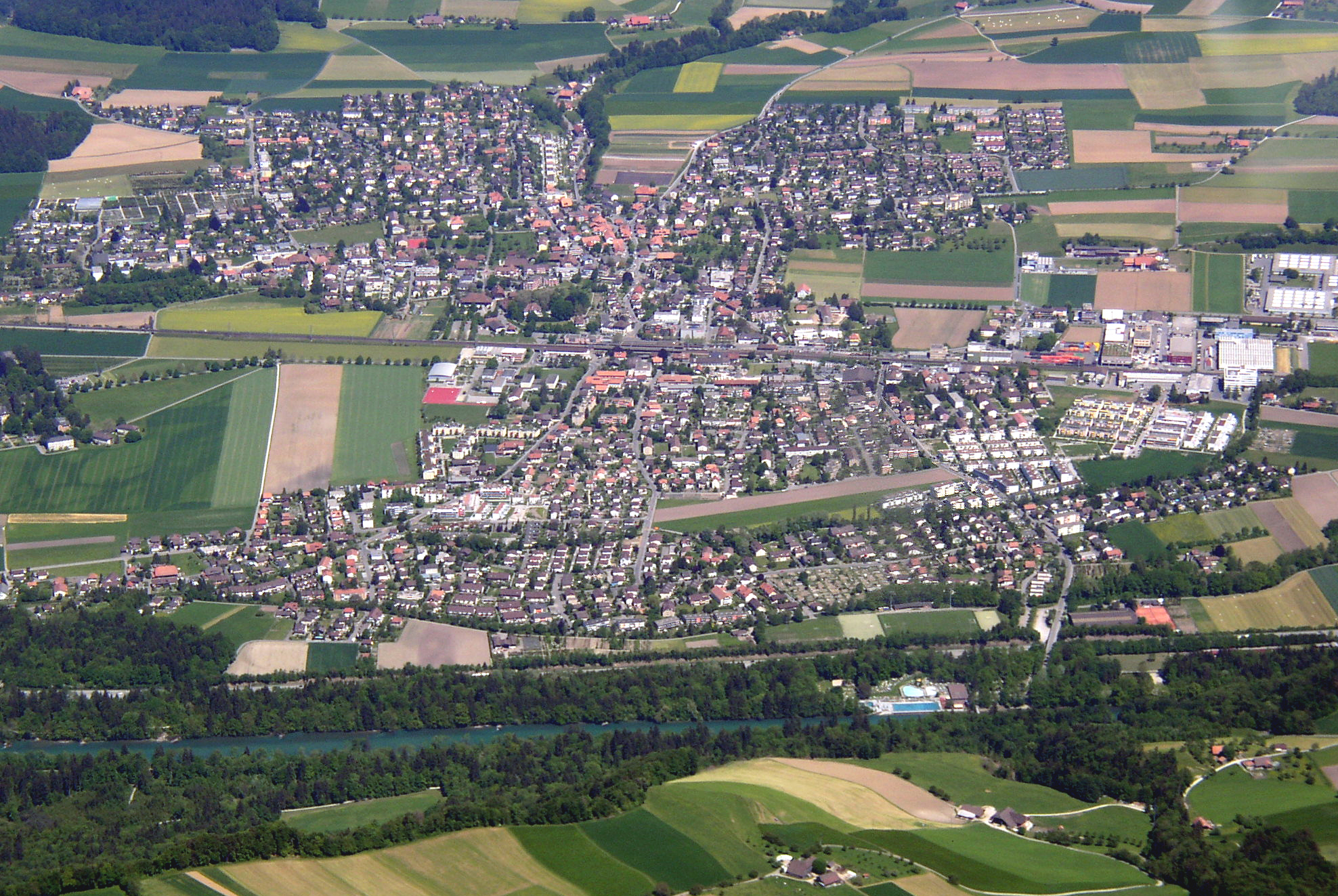
Aerial view of Münsingen town

Münsingen has an area of 15.77 km^{2} (6.09 sq mi). Before the 2017 merger, the area of the municipality was 12.11 km^{2} (4.68 sq mi). Of this area, 3.97 km^{2} (1.53 mi^{2}) or 46.8% is used for agricultural purposes, while 1.45 km^{2} (0.56 mi^{2}) or 17.1% is forested. Of the rest of the land, 2.98 km^{2} (1.15 mi^{2}) or 35.1% is settled (buildings or roads), 0.12 km^{2} (30 acres) or 1.4% is either rivers or lakes and 0.02 km^{2} (4.9 acres) or 0.2% is unproductive land.

Of the built up area, industrial buildings made up 2.4% of the total area while housing and buildings made up 20.8% and transportation infrastructure made up 8.3%. while parks, green belts and sports fields made up 3.3%. Out of the forested land, 15.8% of the total land area is heavily forested and 1.3% is covered with orchards or small clusters of trees. Of the agricultural land, 38.1% is used for growing crops and 6.6% is pastures, while 2.1% is used for orchards or vine crops. All the water in the municipality is flowing water.

The municipality is located in the Aare valley and includes the village of Münsingen, and the canton's psychiatric clinic.

On 31 December 2009 Amtsbezirk Konolfingen, the municipality's former district, was dissolved. On the following day, 1 January 2010, it joined the newly created Verwaltungskreis Bern-Mittelland.

== Coat of arms ==
The blazon of the municipal coat of arms is Gules a Chief and a Pale Argent.

== Demographics ==
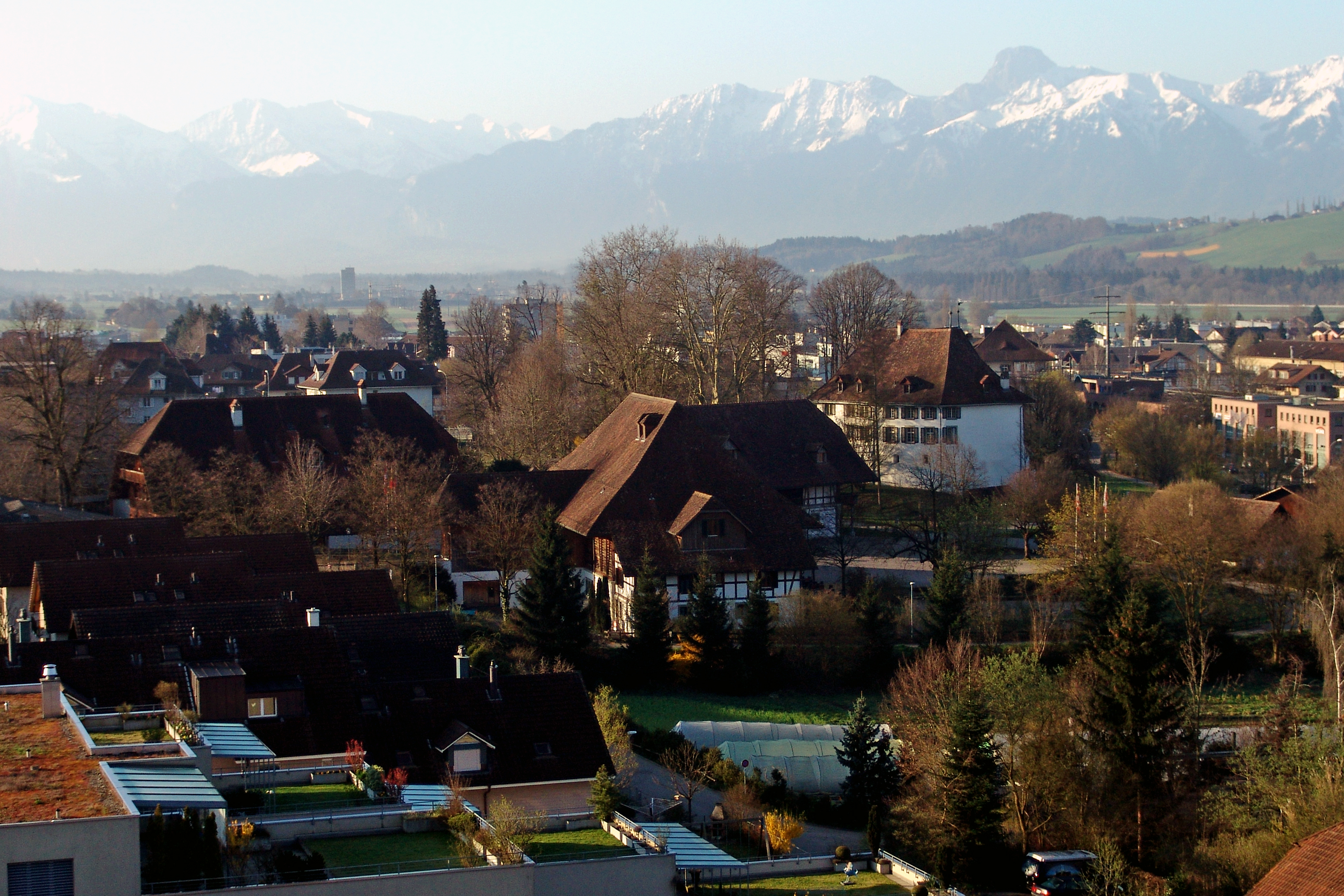
Münsingen castle and surrounding town

Münsingen has a population (as of December 2020) of 12,966. As of 2010, 9.2% of the population are resident foreign nationals. Over the last 10 years (2001-2011) the population has changed at a rate of 0.1%. Migration accounted for -0.1%, while births and deaths accounted for 0.1%.

Most of the population (as of 2000) speaks German (10,164 or 92.9%) as their first language, Italian is the second most common (160 or 1.5%) and French is the third (117 or 1.1%). There are 9 people who speak Romansh.

As of 2008, the population was 47.8% male and 52.2% female. The population was made up of 4,644 Swiss men (42.8% of the population) and 535 (4.9%) non-Swiss men. There were 5,203 Swiss women (48.0%) and 463 (4.3%) non-Swiss women. Of the population in the municipality, 2,660 or about 24.3% were born in Münsingen and lived there in 2000. There were 4,905 or 44.8% who were born in the same canton, while 1,714 or 15.7% were born somewhere else in Switzerland, and 1,167 or 10.7% were born outside of Switzerland.

As of 2011, children and teenagers (0–19 years old) make up 20.4% of the population, while adults (20–64 years old) make up 58.4% and seniors (over 64 years old) make up 21.2%.

As of 2000, there were 4,580 people who were single and never married in the municipality. There were 5,256 married individuals, 571 widows or widowers and 530 individuals who are divorced.

As of 2000, there were 1,386 households that consist of only one person and 249 households with five or more people. In 2000, a total of 4,274 apartments (93.7% of the total) were permanently occupied, while 210 apartments (4.6%) were seasonally occupied and 78 apartments (1.7%) were empty. As of 2010, the construction rate of new housing units was 3.4 new units per 1000 residents. The vacancy rate for the municipality, in 2011, was 1.08%.

The historical population is given in the following chart:

== Heritage sites of national significance ==
The Münsingen Clinic Building, the village rectory and the USM factory and corporate offices are listed as Swiss heritage site of national significance. The facility and grounds around Münsingen Clinic are part of the Inventory of Swiss Heritage Sites.

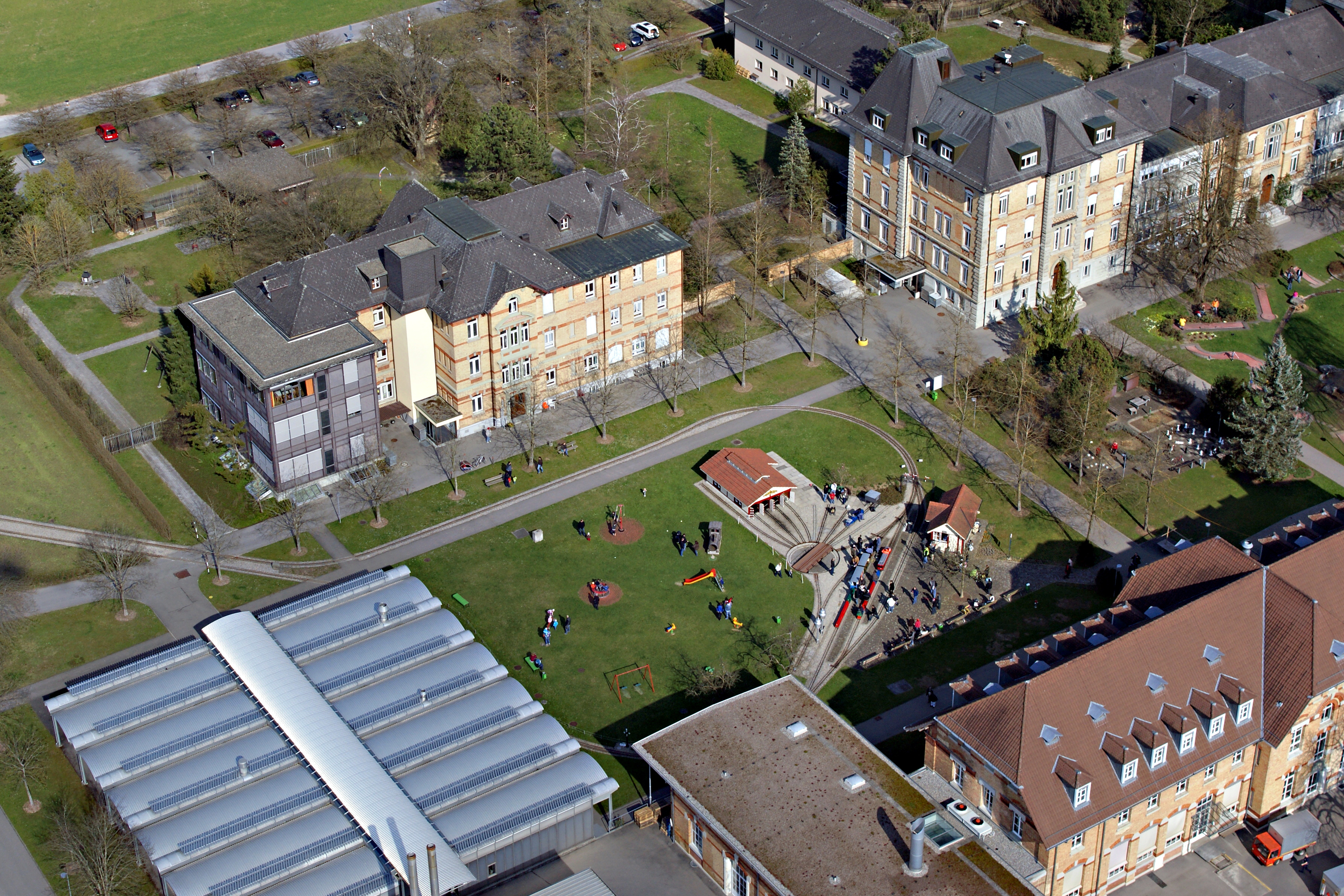
Münsingen Clinic

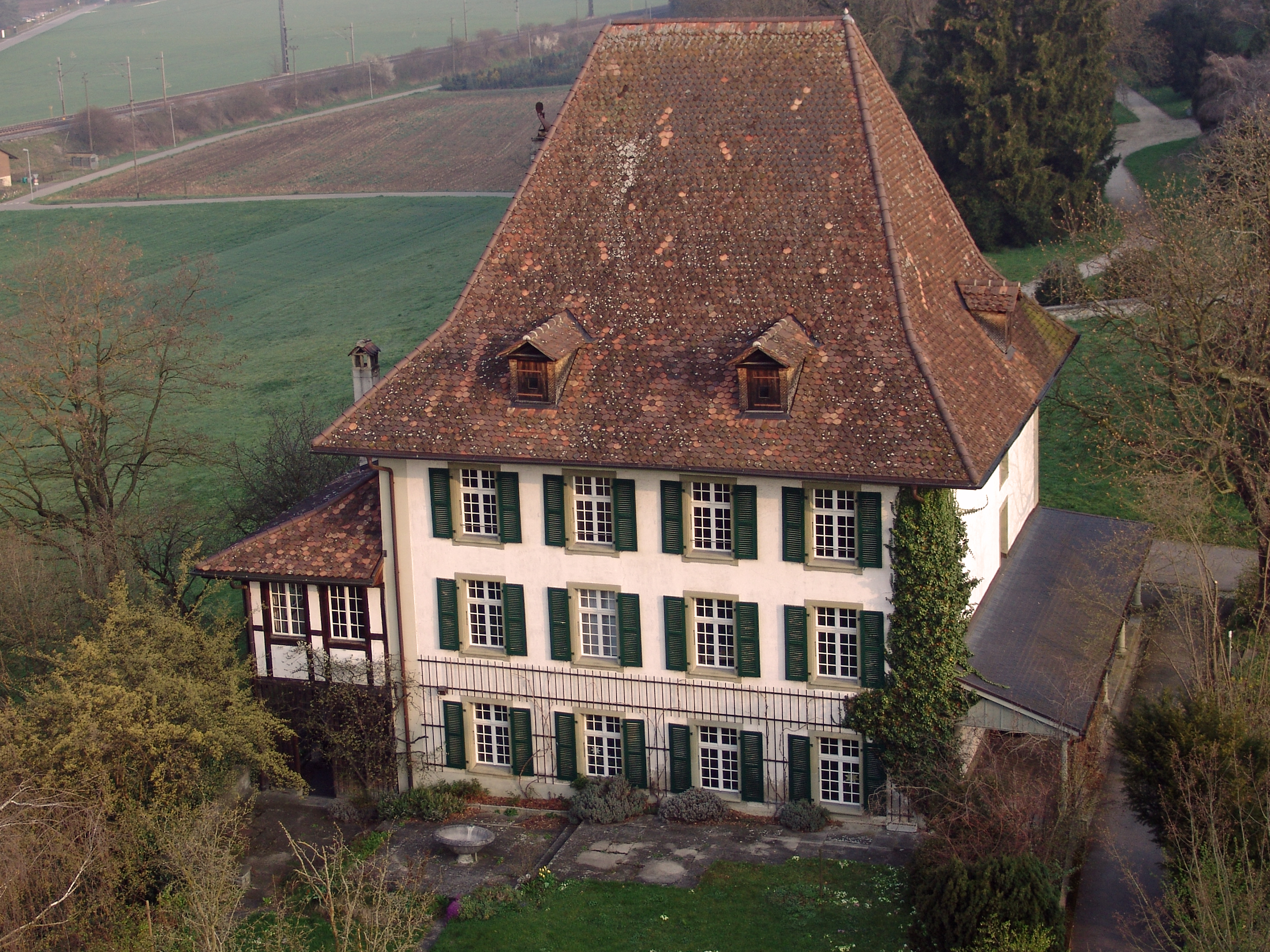
Village rectory

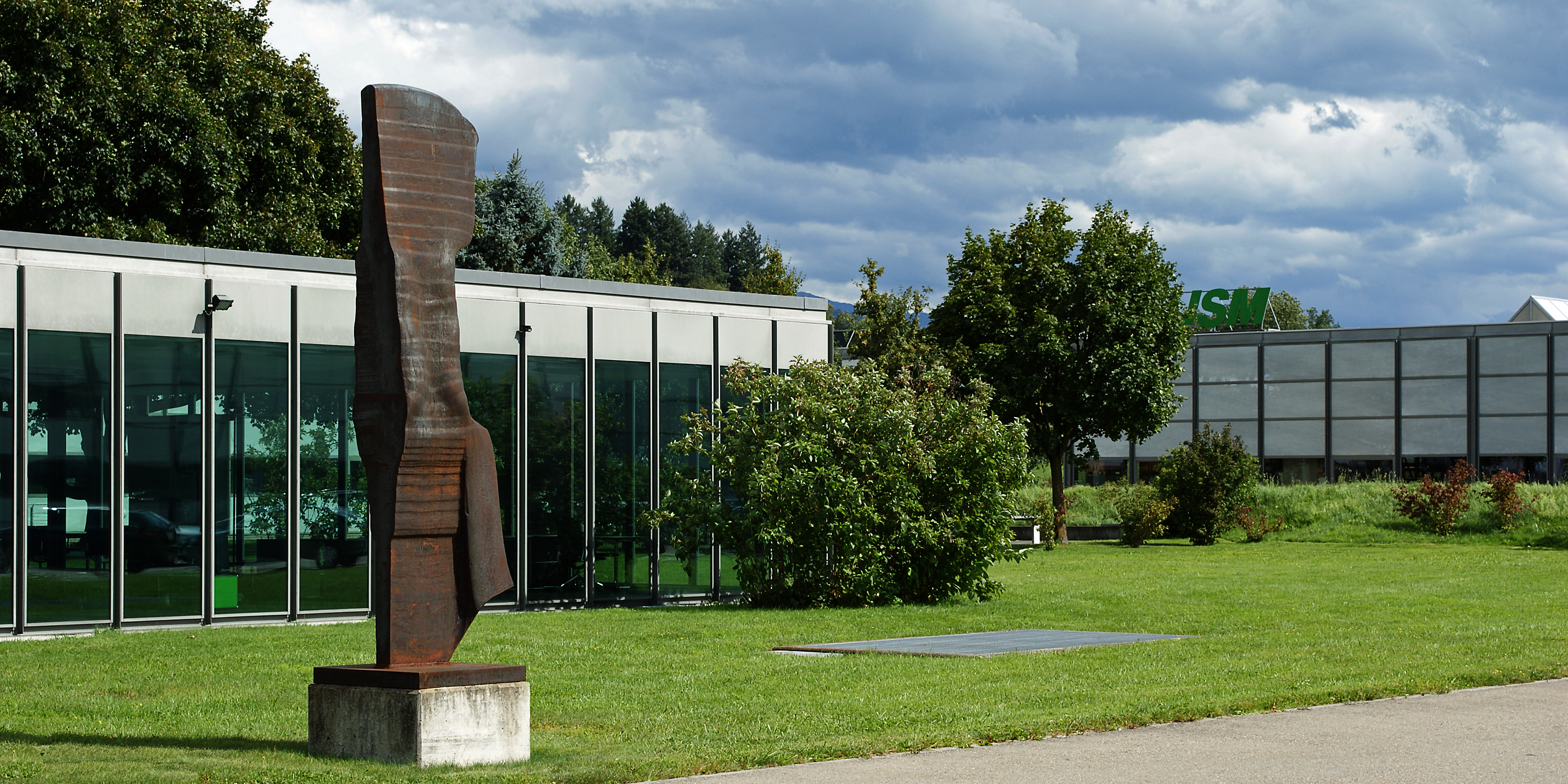
Visitor's center for the USM factory and corporate offices

=== Main sights ===
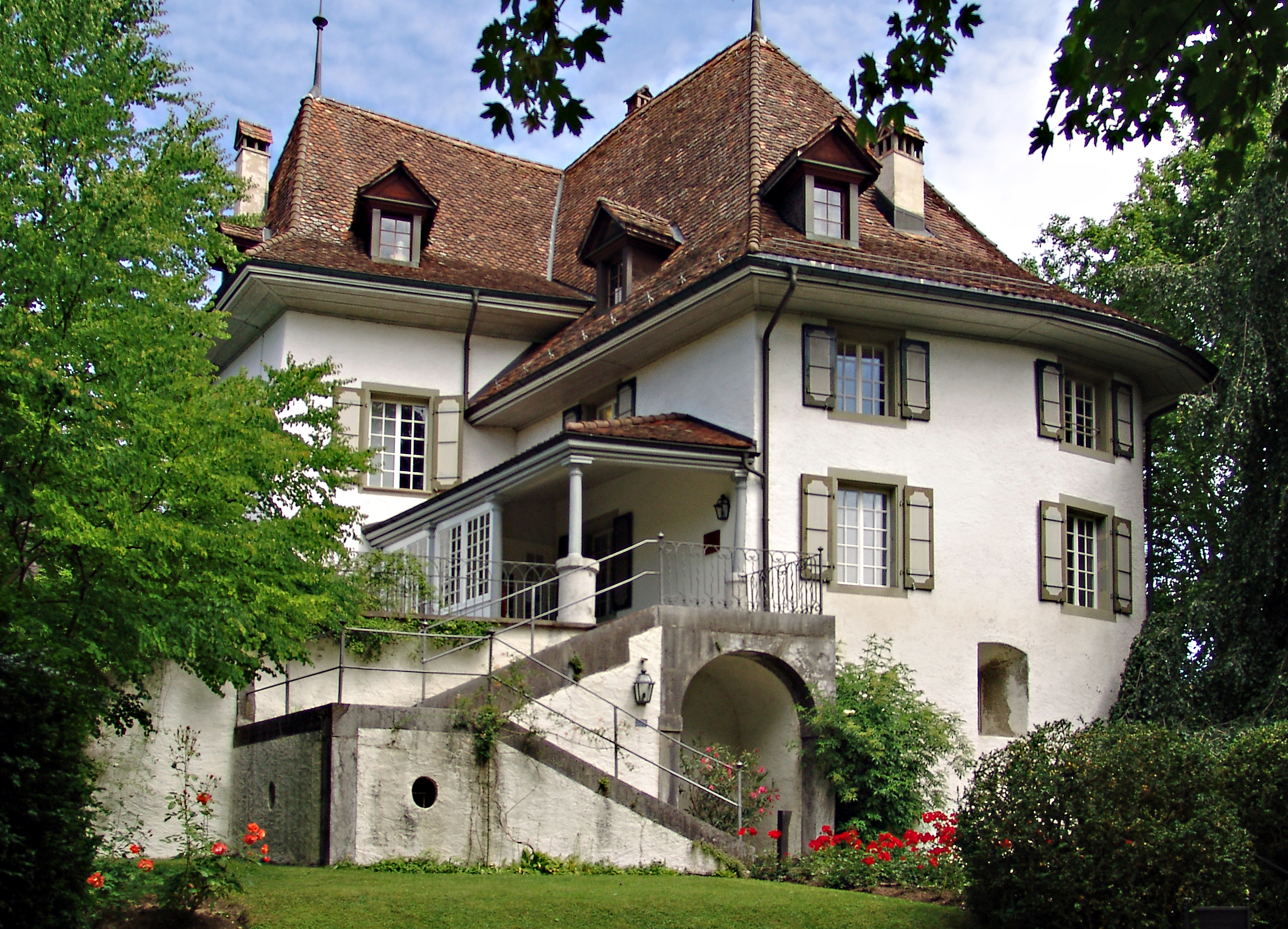
Münsingen Castle

- Münsingen Castle
- Landwirtschaftliche Schule Schwand (the former Schwand Agricultural School)

== Administration ==
Münsingen is administered by a seven-member council and a 30-seat municipal assembly.

== Politics ==
In the 2011 federal election the most popular party was the Swiss People's Party (SVP) which received 21.4% of the vote. The next three most popular parties were the Social Democratic Party (SP) (19.1%), the Conservative Democratic Party (BDP) (16.7%) and the Green Party (12.8%). In the federal election, a total of 4,488 votes were cast, and the voter turnout was 55.3%.

== Religion ==
From the 2000 census, 7,464 or 68.2% belonged to the Swiss Reformed Church, while 1,472 or 13.5% were Roman Catholic. Of the rest of the population, there were 57 members of an Orthodox church (or about 0.52% of the population), there were 7 individuals (or about 0.06% of the population) who belonged to the Christian Catholic Church, and there were 1,181 individuals (or about 10.80% of the population) who belonged to another Christian church. There were 6 individuals (or about 0.05% of the population) who were Jewish, and 261 (or about 2.39% of the population) who were Islamic. There were 21 individuals who were Buddhist, 88 individuals who were Hindu and 4 individuals who belonged to another church. 687 (or about 6.28% of the population) belonged to no church, are agnostic or atheist, and 271 individuals (or about 2.48% of the population) did not answer the question.

== Economy ==
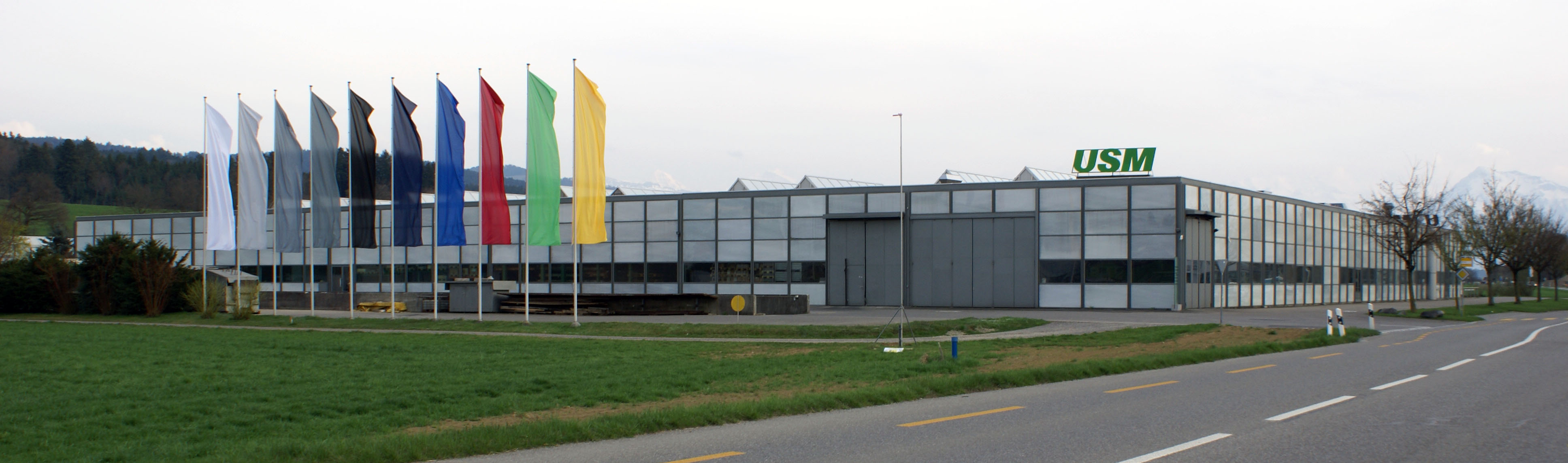
USM factory in Münsingen

Münsingen's most important enterprise is the firm of USM (Ulrich Schaerer Münsingen), internationally known producers of office furniture.

As of 2011, Münsingen had an unemployment rate of 1.8%. As of 2008, there were a total of 5,778 people employed in the municipality. Of these, there were 48 people employed in the primary economic sector and about 16 businesses involved in this sector. 1,485 people were employed in the secondary sector and there were 91 businesses in this sector. 4,245 people were employed in the tertiary sector, with 398 businesses in this sector. There were 5,729 residents of the municipality who were employed in some capacity, of which females made up 45.4% of the workforce.

In 2008 there were a total of 4,680 full-time equivalent jobs. The number of jobs in the primary sector was 37, of which 36 were in agriculture and 1 was in forestry or lumber production. The number of jobs in the secondary sector was 1,386 of which 1,042 or (75.2%) were in manufacturing and 327 (23.6%) were in construction. The number of jobs in the tertiary sector was 3,257. In the tertiary sector; 756 or 23.2% were in wholesale or retail sales or the repair of motor vehicles, 56 or 1.7% were in the movement and storage of goods, 153 or 4.7% were in a hotel or restaurant, 63 or 1.9% were in the information industry, 113 or 3.5% were the insurance or financial industry, 188 or 5.8% were technical professionals or scientists, 400 or 12.3% were in education and 1,175 or 36.1% were in health care.

In 2000, there were 3,211 workers who commuted into the municipality and 3,464 workers who commuted away. The municipality is a net exporter of workers, with about 1.1 workers leaving the municipality for every one entering. Of the working population, 31.7% used public transportation to get to work, and 38.1% used a private car.

== Education ==
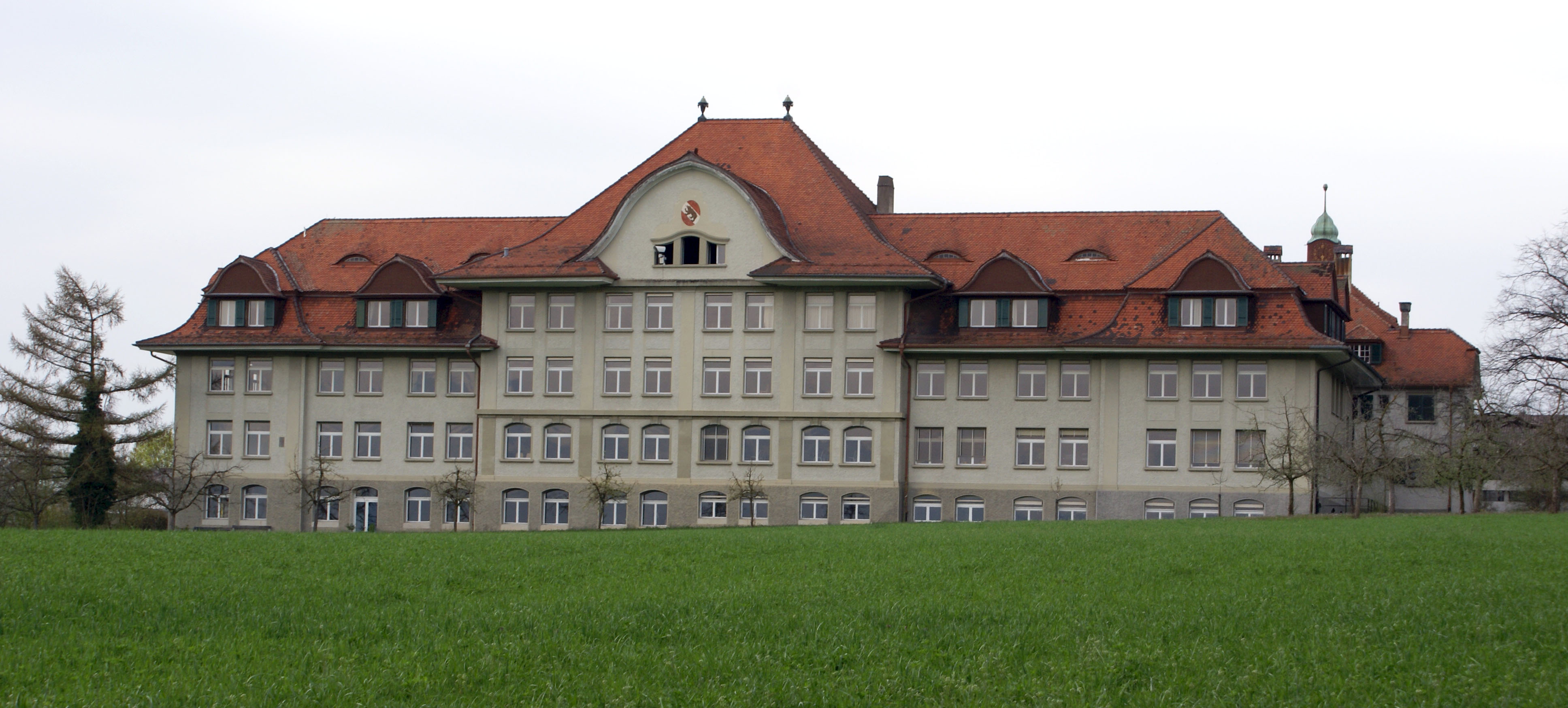
Schwand-Münsingen agricultural school

Educational provision in Münsingen covers all levels from primary school, through middle and secondary schools (Realschule and Sekundarschule), up to senior-level education (Vorgymnasium).

In Münsingen about 4,747 or (43.4%) of the population have completed non-mandatory upper secondary education, and 1,504 or (13.8%) have completed additional higher education (either university or a Fachhochschule). Of the 1,504 who completed tertiary schooling, 73.5% were Swiss men, 19.5% were Swiss women, 4.8% were non-Swiss men and 2.2% were non-Swiss women.

The Canton of Bern school system provides one year of non-obligatory Kindergarten, followed by six years of Primary school. This is followed by three years of obligatory lower Secondary school where the students are separated according to ability and aptitude. Following the lower Secondary students may attend additional schooling or they may enter an apprenticeship. D

During the 2010–11 school year, there were a total of 1,341 students attending classes in Münsingen. There were 10 kindergarten classes with a total of 177 students in the municipality. Of the kindergarten students, 14.1% were permanent or temporary residents of Switzerland (not citizens) and 19.8% have a different mother language than the classroom language. The municipality had 34 primary classes and 682 students. Of the primary students, 11.6% were permanent or temporary residents of Switzerland (not citizens) and 16.7% have a different mother language than the classroom language. During the same year, there were 23 lower secondary classes with a total of 454 students. There were 8.4% who were permanent or temporary residents of Switzerland (not citizens) and 9.9% have a different mother language than the classroom language. The remainder of the students attend a private or special school.

As of 2000, there were 204 students in Münsingen who came from another municipality, while 355 residents attended schools outside the municipality.

== Sport ==
FC Münsingen is the town's football club.

== Twin towns – sister cities ==
Münsingen is twinned with:

- Humpolec, Czech Republic

== Notable people ==
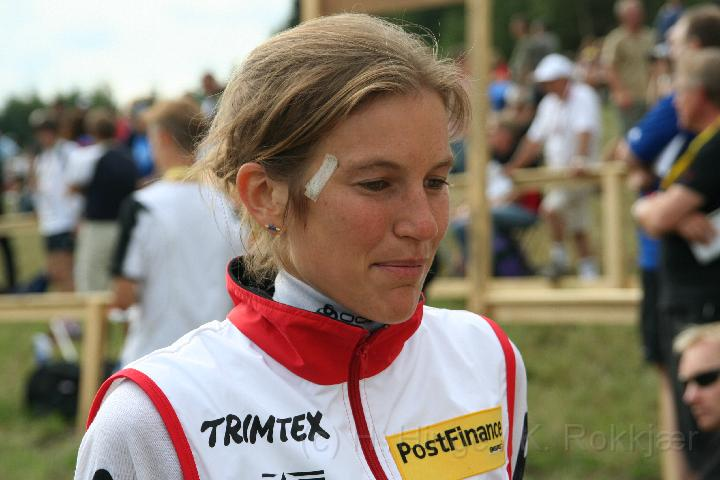
Simone Niggli-Luder, 2006

- Christian Müller (1921 in Münsingen – 2013) a Swiss teacher, writer, psychiatrist and psychoanalyst
- Simone Niggli-Luder (born 1978) a Swiss orienteering athlete, lives in Münsingen
- Roman Bürki (born 1990 in Münsingen) a Swiss professional footballer, approaching 300 club caps
- Medon Berisha (born 2003) a professional footballer who plays for US Lecce and the Albania national football team
- Nora von Bergen (born 1990 in Münsingen) a Swiss ice dancer
- Patric Niederhauser (born 1991 in Münsingen) a professional racing driver
- Michael Frey (born 1994 in Münsingen) a Swiss footballer, approaching 300 club caps
- Reto Keller (born 1994 in Münsingen) a Swiss curler
