= Wil Castle =

Castle in Schlosswil, Switzerland

- Schloss Wil
- Schlosswil
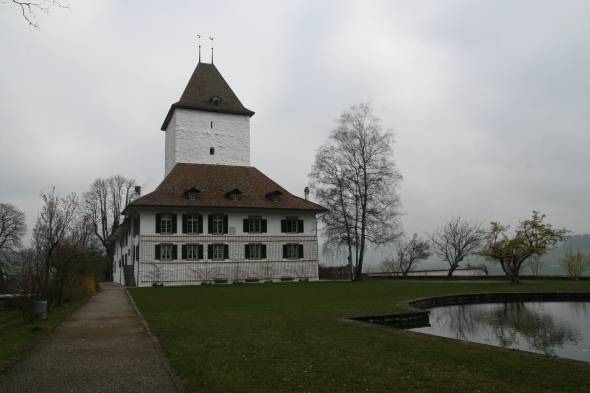
- Wil Castle (Southern Side)

Site information
- Owner: Steinmann Foundation
- Open to the public: For meetings and events

Location
- Coordinates: 46.908139°N 7.608028°E
- Height: 43.5 m (143 ft)

Site history
- Built: 12th century

Wil Castle (German: Schloss Wil, Schloss Wyl or Schloss Schlosswil) is a castle from the 13th and 16th century in the municipality of Schlosswil in the Canton of Bern, Switzerland. The castle is a popular destination for locals and is a Heritage Site of National Significance. It was the administrative seat of the Konolfingen District.

== History ==
During the Middle Ages, a fortress (German: Burg Wil) was built near the village and it became the seat of the Herrschaft of Schlosswil. The lords of the fort, the Freiherren von Wiler, were first mentioned in 1146. The von Wiler family died out around 1300, and the village and associated territory passed through several noble families, including the Freiherren von Signau and eventually the Senn von Münsingen family. The territory was split in half and passed through several Bernese patrician families until Burkhard von Erlach reunited the two halves in 1514.

In 1546 the medieval castle was destroyed in a fire. Shortly thereafter it was rebuilt as a larger castle under the direction of the master builder Niklaus von Wattenwyl-May. The current appearance comes from a 1780 renovation that gave the castle a Baroque exterior.

Following the 1798 French invasion, under the Helvetic Republic the nobility lost much of their power and property and by 1812 the castle was acquired by the Canton of Bern. In 1818 the castle tower became the only granary for the district of Konolfingen. A famine in 1816-17 was partly alleviated by the grain at the castle. In 1847 the tower was converted into a prison, a role that it filled until 1881. Even after the prison closed, the castle continued to be used by the district administration and courts. In 2010 the District of Konolfingen was dissolved and the need for district offices vanished. In 2011 it was acquired by Matthias Steinmann, who founded the Steinmann Foundation to operate the castle.

== Castle site ==
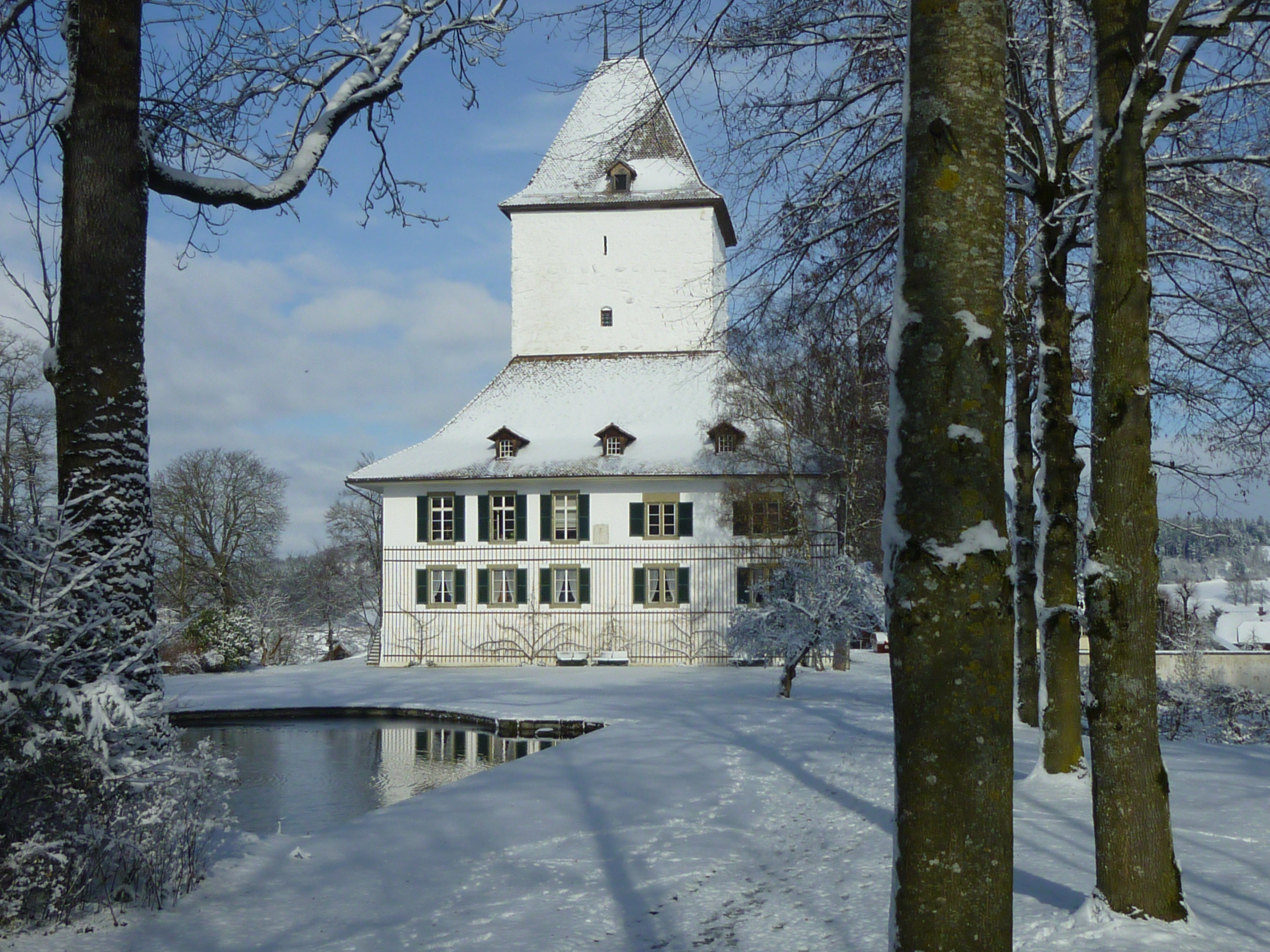
Wil Castle in winter

The original fortress tower was built in first half of the 12th century for the von Wiler family. The walls of the square tower are 38 meters (125 ft) tall and to the peak of the roof is 43.5 meters (143 ft). At the ground floor, the building is 11.3 by 11.7 metres (37 ft × 38 ft) and the massive walls are up to 3.4 metres (11 ft) thick.
