= Stocken-Höfen =

- Municipality
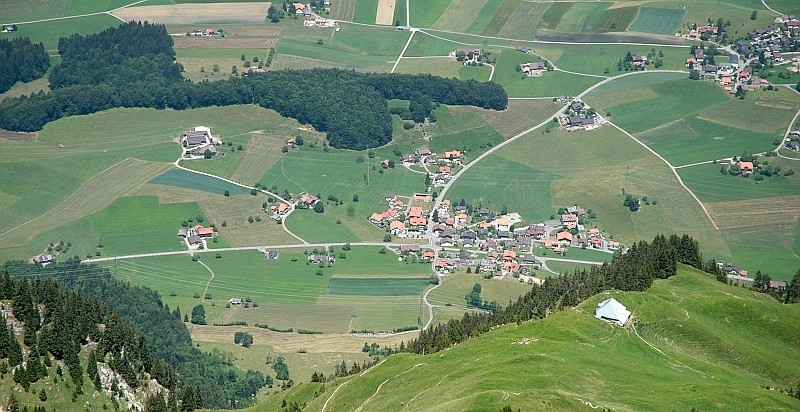
- Oberstocken village from the peak of the Stockhorn

- Flag Coat of arms
- Location of Stocken-Höfen
- Location within Switzerland Location within Canton of Bern
- Coordinates: 46°42′N 7°35′E
- Country: Switzerland
- Canton: Bern
- District: Thun

Area
  - Total: 14.21 km^{2} (5.49 sq mi)

Population (Dec 2012)
  - Total: 978
  - Density: 68.8/km^{2} (178/sq mi)
- Time zone: UTC+01:00 (CET)
  - Summer (DST): UTC+02:00 (CEST)
- Postal code: 3631-32
- SFOS number: 770
- ISO 3166 code: CH-BE
- Surrounded by: Erlenbach im Simmental, Reutigen, Zwieselberg, Amsoldingen, Übeschi, Pohlern
- Website: http://www.stocken-hoefen.ch/

Stocken-Höfen is a municipality in the administrative district of Thun in the canton of Bern in Switzerland. On 1 January 2014 the former municipalities of Niederstocken, Oberstocken and Höfen merged into the municipality of Stocken-Höfen.

== History ==
=== Höfen ===
The oldest trace of a settlement in the area is a single Neolithic artifact which was found in the Hofallmend. During the Middle Ages a small hunting estate, known as the Turm zu Stocken or Friedberg, was built above the Amsoldingersee. Very little is known of its early history, but in 1308 the Duke of Austria granted it to the knightly Amsoldingen family. The village of Höfen grew up around the estate and was part of the Amsoldingen lands and Amsoldingen parish. By the 15th century disputes over village farming land established the borders of the village. The Amsoldingens held the estate for almost two centuries, but gave it up in 1492. It passed through several other owners until it became part of the Blumenstein Herrschaft in 1642. Later the estate was abandoned and fell into ruins.

Traditionally the villagers raised livestock which they took to Thun to sell. In the 20th century, many of the residents began commuting to jobs in Thun or neighboring cities. Beginning in the 1980s the population began to grow and the Schindlern-Kistlern neighborhood was built.

=== Niederstocken ===
Niederstocken is first mentioned in 1351 as Stogken.

The oldest trace of a settlement in the area is a Stone Age tool production site on the Stockenfluh mountain. During the Middle Ages the village was part of the lands and parish of the college of canons at Amsoldingen. In 1485 the office of canon was abolished and the Amsoldingen lands were acquired by Bern. In 1505, it was incorporated into the Bernese district of Thun, where it remained until 1803. At that time it joined the Niedersimmental District. Between 1898 and 1926 the Stockentalbahn railroad company unsuccessfully attempted to build a railroad through the Stockental valley including Niederstocken. In 1921 a road was built to the municipality. There were several unsuccessful attempts to combine the villages of Oberstocken and Niederstocken, the most recent was in 1988. Today the municipality remains generally isolated and has retained its agrarian character.

The village was part of the parish of Amsoldingen until 1485, when it joined the Reutigen parish. In 1481, Hans Schütz, built a chapel in the village. By 1556 Niederstocken accepted the new faith of the Protestant Reformation and the village chapel was demolished.

=== Oberstocken ===
Oberstocken is first mentioned in 1351 as Stogken.

During the Middle Ages the village was part of the lands and parish of the college of canons at Amsoldingen. In 1485 the office of canon was abolished and the Amsoldingen lands were acquired by Bern. In 1505, it was incorporated into the Bernese district of Thun, where it remained until 1803. At that time it joined the Niedersimmental District. Between 1898 and 1926 the Stockentalbahn railroad company unsuccessfully attempted to build a railroad through the Stockental valley to Oberstocken. There were several unsuccessful attempts to combine the villages of Oberstocken and Niederstocken, the most recent was in 1988. "

== Geography ==
The former municipalities that now make up Stocken-Höfen have a total combined area of 14.22 km^{2} (5.49 sq mi).

== Demographics ==
The total population of Stocken-Höfen (as of December 2020) is 1,041.

== Historic population ==
The historical population is given in the following chart:

== Civil Defense ==
Oberstocken is designated as a civil defense evacuation site, with over 350 small bunkers. The main civil defense building is temporarily used as a garage which houses 16 vehicles.
