= Höfen, Thun =

Höfen
- Former municipality
- Flag Coat of arms
- Location of Höfen
- Location within Switzerland Location within Canton of Bern
- Coordinates: 46°43′N 7°33′E
- Country: Switzerland
- Canton: Bern
- District: Thun

Area
  - Total: 4.62 km^{2} (1.78 sq mi)
- Elevation: 705 m (2,313 ft)
- Highest elevation (Stockbeissern): 833 m (2,733 ft)
- Lowest elevation (Amsoldingersee): 641 m (2,103 ft)

Population (Dec 2011)
  - Total: 444
  - Density: 96.1/km^{2} (249/sq mi)
- Time zone: UTC+01:00 (CET)
  - Summer (DST): UTC+02:00 (CEST)
- Postal code: 3631
- SFOS number: 930
- ISO 3166 code: CH-BE
- Surrounded by: Niederstocken, Oberstocken, Reutigen, Zwieselberg, Amsoldingen, Übeschi and Pohlern
- Website: www.hoefen.ch

Höfen is a former municipality in the administrative district of Thun in the canton of Bern in Switzerland. On 1 January 2014 the former municipalities of Höfen, Niederstocken and Oberstocken merged into the new municipality of Stocken-Höfen.

== Geography ==
Aerial view with Amsoldinger Lake and Höfen (1952)

Before the merger, Höfen had a total area of 4.6 km^{2} (1.8 mi^{2}). Of this area, 3.42 km^{2} (1.32 sq mi) or 74.2% is used for agricultural purposes, while 0.74 km^{2} (0.29 sq mi) or 16.1% is forested. Of the rest of the land, 0.27 km^{2} (0.10 sq mi) or 5.9% is settled (buildings or roads), 0.1 km^{2} (25 acres) or 2.2% is either rivers or lakes and 0.08 km^{2} (20 acres) or 1.7% is unproductive land.

Of the built up area, housing and buildings made up 2.8% and transportation infrastructure made up 2.8%. 14.5% of the total land area is heavily forested and 1.5% is covered with orchards or small clusters of trees. Of the agricultural land, 23.9% is used for growing crops and 48.2% is pastures, while 2.2% is used for orchards or vine crops. All the water in the municipality is in lakes. Of the unproductive areas, 1.7% is unproductive vegetation.

The lake Uebeschisee is located partially in the former municipality.

== Demographics ==
Höfen had a population (as of 2011) of 444. As of 2007, 2.1% of the population was made up of foreign nationals. Over the last 10 years the population has decreased at a rate of -3.5%. Most of the population (as of 2000) speaks German (98.7%), with French being second most common ( 0.3%) and Rhaeto-romance being third ( 0.3%).

In the 2007 election the most popular party was the SVP which received 49.6% of the vote. The next three most popular parties were the Green Party (12.3%), the SPS (11.6%) and the local small left-wing parties (10.7%).

The age distribution of the population (as of 2000) is children and teenagers (0–19 years old) make up 29.4% of the population, while adults (20–64 years old) make up 59.3% and seniors (over 64 years old) make up 11.3%. The entire Swiss population is generally well educated. In Höfen about 77.7% of the population (between age 25–64) have completed either non-mandatory upper secondary education or additional higher education (either university or a Fachhochschule).

Höfen has an unemployment rate of 0.92%. As of 2005, there were 65 people employed in the primary economic sector and about 26 businesses involved in this sector. 9 people are employed in the secondary sector and there are 3 businesses in this sector. 56 people are employed in the tertiary sector, with 10 businesses in this sector. The historical population is given in the following table:

year	population
1764	184
1850	456
1900	342
1930	291
1950	341
2000	398
