= Niederstocken =

- Former municipality
- Flag Coat of arms
- Location of Niederstocken
- Location within Switzerland Location within Canton of Bern
- Coordinates: 46°42′N 7°35′E
- Country: Switzerland
- Canton: Bern
- District: Thun

Area
  - Total: 5.5 km^{2} (2.1 sq mi)
- Elevation: 634 m (2,080 ft)

Population (Dec 2011)
  - Total: 258
  - Density: 47/km^{2} (120/sq mi)
- Time zone: UTC+01:00 (CET)
  - Summer (DST): UTC+02:00 (CEST)
- Postal code: 3632
- SFOS number: 764
- ISO 3166 code: CH-BE
- Surrounded by: Erlenbach im Simmental, Höfen, Oberstocken, Reutigen
- Website: SFSO statistics

Niederstocken is a former municipality in the administrative district of Thun in the canton of Bern in Switzerland. On 1 January 2014 the former municipalities of Niederstocken, Oberstocken and Höfen merged into the new municipality of Stocken-Höfen.

== History ==
Niederstocken is first mentioned in 1351 as Stogken.

The oldest trace of a settlement in the area is a Stone Age tool production site on the Stockenfluh mountain. During the Middle Ages the village was part of the lands and parish of the college of canons at Amsoldingen. In 1485 the office of canon was abolished and the Amsoldingen lands were acquired by Bern. In 1505, it was incorporated into the Bernese district of Thun, where it remained until 1803. At that time it joined the Niedersimmental District. Between 1898 and 1926 the Stockentalbahn railroad company unsuccessfully attempted to build a railroad through the Stockental valley including Niederstocken. In 1921 a road was built to the municipality. There were several unsuccessful attempts to combine the villages of Oberstocken and Niederstocken, the most recent was in 1988. Today the municipality remains generally isolated and has retained its agrarian character.

The village was part of the parish of Amsoldingen until 1485, when it joined the Reutigen parish. In 1481, Hans Schütz, built a chapel in the village. By 1556 Niederstocken accepted the new faith of the Protestant Reformation and the village chapel was demolished.

== Geography ==
Before the merger, Niederstocken had a total area of 5.5 km^{2} (2.1 mi^{2}). As of 2012, a total of 1.36 km^{2} (0.53 mi^{2}) or 24.8% is used for agricultural purposes, while 3 km^{2} (1.2 mi^{2}) or 54.7% is forested. The rest of the municipality is 0.2 km^{2} (0.077 mi^{2}) or 3.6% is settled (buildings or roads), 0.01 km^{2} (2.5 acres) or 0.2% is either rivers or lakes and 0.92 km^{2} (0.36 mi^{2}) or 16.8% is unproductive land.

During the same year, housing and buildings made up 2.4% and transportation infrastructure made up 1.3%. A total of 50.2% of the total land area is heavily forested and 1.6% is covered with orchards or small clusters of trees. Of the agricultural land, 5.5% is used for growing crops and 16.2% is pasturage and 2.9% is used for alpine pastures. All the water in the municipality is flowing water. Of the unproductive areas, 10.4% is unproductive vegetation and 6.4% is too rocky for vegetation.

It is located in the Stockental (Stock Valley). The former municipality stretches from the valley up into the mountains and contains the Stockhorn mountain.

On 31 December 2009 Amtsbezirk Niedersimmental, the municipality's former district, was dissolved. On the following day, 1 January 2010, it joined the newly created Verwaltungskreis Thun.

== Coat of arms ==
The blazon of the municipal coat of arms is Per fess Gules a Rose Argent barbed and seeded proper and of the second a Stump Sable between two Mullets of the first. The coat of arms is an example of canting arms with the stump (German: Stock) placed in the lower (German: nieder) half of the shield. The neighboring municipality of Oberstocken has the stump in the upper half.

== Demographics ==
Niederstocken had a population (as of 2011) of 258. As of 2010, 1.2% of the population are resident foreign nationals. Over the last 10 years (2001–2011) the population has changed at a rate of 1.6%. Migration accounted for 2%, while births and deaths accounted for 1.2%.

Most of the population (as of 2000) speaks German (284 or 97.6%) as their first language, Serbo-Croatian is the second most common (3 or 1.0%) and French is the third (1 or 0.3%). There is 1 person who speaks Italian.

As of 2008, the population was 45.7% male and 54.3% female. The population was made up of 114 Swiss men (44.9% of the population) and 2 non-Swiss men. There were 137 Swiss women (53.9%) and 1 non-Swiss women. Of the population in the municipality, 94 or about 32.3% were born in Niederstocken and lived there in 2000. There were 151 or 51.9% who were born in the same canton, while 27 or 9.3% were born somewhere else in Switzerland, and 14 or 4.8% were born outside of Switzerland.

As of 2011, children and teenagers (0–19 years old) make up 20.2% of the population, while adults (20–64 years old) make up 60.5% and seniors (over 64 years old) make up 19.4%.

As of 2000, there were 127 people who were single and never married in the municipality. There were 137 married individuals, 18 widows or widowers and 9 individuals who are divorced.

As of 2010, there were 33 households that consist of only one person and 8 households with five or more people. In 2000, a total of 109 apartments (85.2% of the total) were permanently occupied, while 12 apartments (9.4%) were seasonally occupied and 7 apartments (5.5%) were empty. As of 2010, the construction rate of new housing units was 7.9 new units per 1000 residents. The vacancy rate for the municipality, in 2012, was 0.76%. In 2011, single family homes made up 50.5% of the total housing in the municipality.

The historical population is given in the following chart:

== Politics ==
In the 2011 federal election the most popular party was the Swiss People's Party (SVP) which received 44% of the vote. The next three most popular parties were the Conservative Democratic Party (BDP) (19.6%), the Social Democratic Party (SP) (10.8%) and the Green Party (6.3%). In the federal election, a total of 107 votes were cast, and the voter turnout was 50.2%.

== Economy ==
As of 2011, Niederstocken had an unemployment rate of 0.41%. As of 2008, there were a total of 74 people employed in the municipality. Of these, there were 30 people employed in the primary economic sector and about 9 businesses involved in this sector. 7 people were employed in the secondary sector and there were 5 businesses in this sector. 37 people were employed in the tertiary sector, with 7 businesses in this sector. There were 154 residents of the municipality who were employed in some capacity, of which females made up 44.2% of the workforce.

In 2008 there were a total of 51 full-time equivalent jobs. The number of jobs in the primary sector was 17, all of which were in agriculture. The number of jobs in the secondary sector was 6 of which 1 was in manufacturing and 5 (83.3%) were in construction. The number of jobs in the tertiary sector was 28. In the tertiary sector; 5 or 17.9% were in the movement and storage of goods, 9 or 32.1% were in a hotel or restaurant, 1 was a technical professional or scientist, 12 or 42.9% were in education.

In 2000, there were 20 workers who commuted into the municipality and 109 workers who commuted away. The municipality is a net exporter of workers, with about 5.5 workers leaving the municipality for every one entering. A total of 45 workers (69.2% of the 65 total workers in the municipality) both lived and worked in Niederstocken. Of the working population, 6.5% used public transportation to get to work, and 57.8% used a private car.

In 2011 the average local and cantonal tax rate on a married resident, with two children, of Niederstocken making 150,000 CHF was 13%, while an unmarried resident's rate was 19.1%. For comparison, the average rate for the entire canton in the same year, was 14.2% and 22.0%, while the nationwide average was 12.3% and 21.1% respectively. In 2009 there were a total of 107 tax payers in the municipality. Of that total, 21 made over 75,000 CHF per year. There was one person who made between 15,000 and 20,000 per year. The greatest number of workers, 30, made between 50,000 and 75,000 CHF per year. The average income of the over 75,000 CHF group in Niederstocken was 93,290 CHF, while the average across all of Switzerland was 130,478 CHF.

In 2011 a total of 2.0% of the population received direct financial assistance from the government.

== Religion ==
From the 2000 census, 235 or 80.8% belonged to the Swiss Reformed Church, while 24 or 8.2% were Roman Catholic. Of the rest of the population, there were 2 members of an Orthodox church (or about 0.69% of the population), and there were 11 individuals (or about 3.78% of the population) who belonged to another Christian church. There were 2 (or about 0.69% of the population) who were Islamic. 12 (or about 4.12% of the population) belonged to no church, are agnostic or atheist, and 5 individuals (or about 1.72% of the population) did not answer the question.

== Education ==
In Niederstocken about 66.4% of the population have completed non-mandatory upper secondary education, and 7.4% have completed additional higher education (either university or a Fachhochschule). Of the 12 who had completed some form of tertiary schooling listed in the census, 58.3% were Swiss men, 25.0% were Swiss women.

The Canton of Bern school system provides one year of non-obligatory Kindergarten, followed by six years of Primary school. This is followed by three years of obligatory lower Secondary school where the students are separated according to ability and aptitude. Following the lower Secondary students may attend additional schooling or they may enter an apprenticeship.

During the 2011–12 school year, there were a total of 36 students attending classes in Niederstocken. There was one kindergarten class with a total of 8 students in the municipality. The municipality had 2 primary classes and 28 students. Of the primary students, 3.6% were permanent or temporary residents of Switzerland (not citizens).

As of 2000, there were a total of 39 students attending any school in the municipality. Of those, 38 both lived and attended school in the municipality, while one student came from another municipality. During the same year, 13 residents attended schools outside the municipality.

Niederstocken is home to the Schul- und Gemeindebibliothek Niederstocken (municipal library of Niederstocken). The library has (as of 2008) 4,357 books or other media, and loaned out 4,566 items in the same year. It was open a total of 85 days with average of 3.5 hours per week during that year.
