= Pohlern =

- Municipality
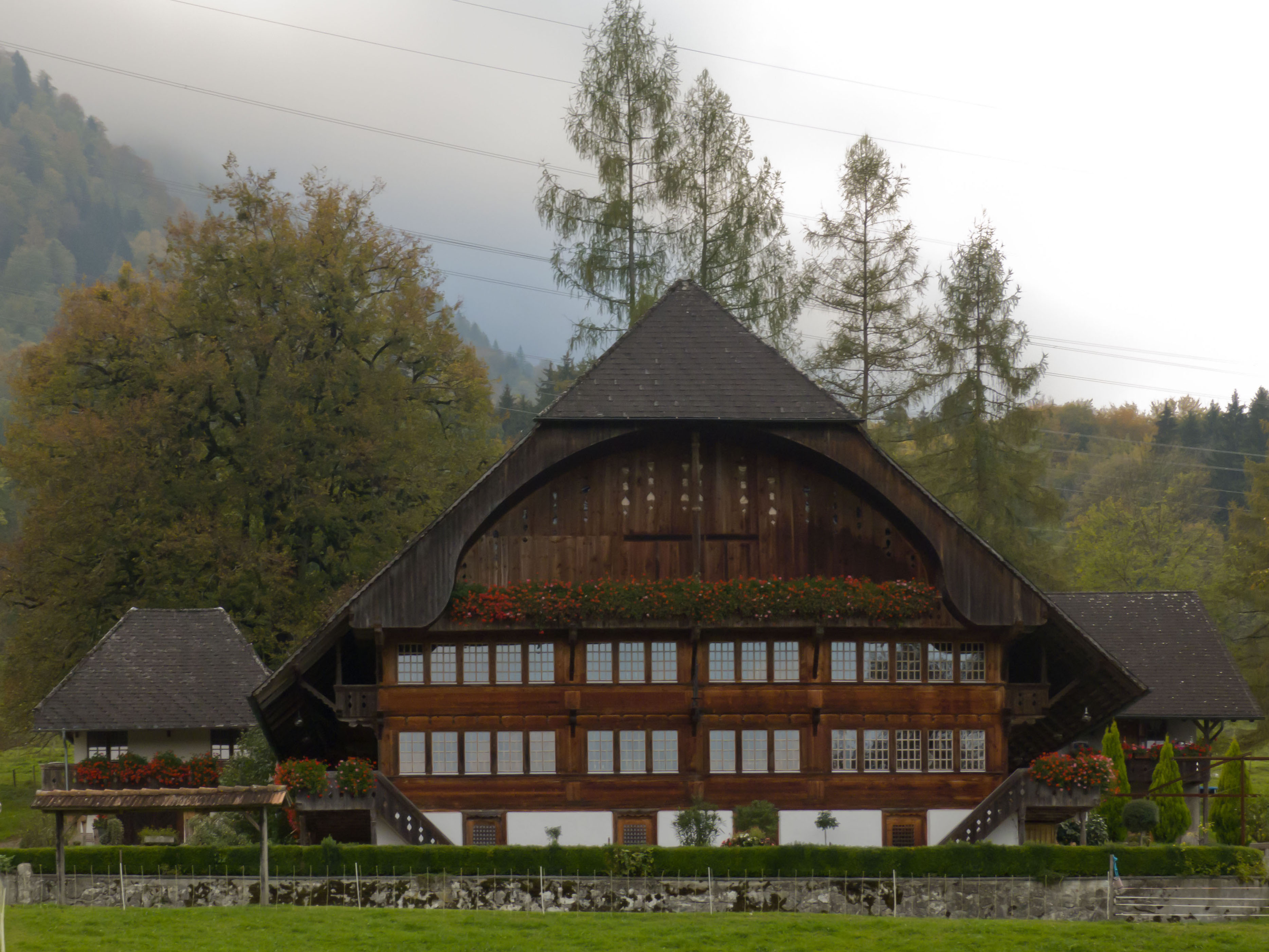
- The Farm House in Rohrmoos, a Swiss Heritage Site

- Flag Coat of arms
- Location of Pohlern
- Location within Switzerland Location within Canton of Bern
- Coordinates: 46°43′N 7°32′E
- Country: Switzerland
- Canton: Bern
- District: Thun

Government
  - Mayor: Bruno Minder

Area
  - Total: 10.67 km^{2} (4.12 sq mi)
- Elevation: 710 m (2,330 ft)

Population (Dec 2012)
  - Total: 263
  - Density: 24.6/km^{2} (63.8/sq mi)
- Time zone: UTC+01:00 (CET)
  - Summer (DST): UTC+02:00 (CEST)
- Postal code: 3638
- SFOS number: 936
- ISO 3166 code: CH-BE
- Surrounded by: Därstetten, Oberstocken, Höfen, Übeschi, and Blumenstein.
- Website: www.pohlern.ch

Pohlern is a municipality in the administrative district of Thun in the canton of Bern in Switzerland.

== History ==
Pohlern is first mentioned in 1389 as in der Polleren.

Until the Late Middle Ages Pohlern was virtually uninhabited forest in the Herrschaft of Strättligen. During the 14th century it was gradually settled under the rule of the Freiherr von Burgistein. By 1417 the Barfüsser (Franciscan mendicant) monastery in Bern owned some land and rights in the village. In 1459 it was combined with Uebeschi to form the Herrschaft of Pohlern. In 1499 and further in 1516 the Bernese patrician May family acquired parts of the village. In 1528 Bern adopted the new faith of the Protestant Reformation and suppressed all the monasteries, including the Barfüssers. Bern took over Pohlern and dissolved the Herrschaft. Pohlern became part of the court of Amsoldingen in the Thun District, where it remained until the district was dissolved in 2009. Today most residents either work in agriculture or commute to jobs outside the municipality.

For most of its history, the village was part of the parish of Thierachern. In 1922 it was assigned to the nearby parish of Blumenstein, with which it also shares a school house.

== Geography ==
Pohlern has an area of 9.87 km^{2} (3.81 sq mi). As of the 2004 survey, a total of 3.7 km^{2} (1.4 mi^{2}) or 37.4% is used for agricultural purposes, while 4.48 km^{2} (1.73 mi^{2}) or 45.3% is forested. Of rest of the municipality 0.19 km^{2} (0.073 mi^{2}) or 1.9% is settled (buildings or roads), 0.15 km^{2} (37 acres) or 1.5% is either rivers or lakes and 1.42 km^{2} (0.55 mi^{2}) or 14.4% is unproductive land.

From the same survey, housing and buildings made up 0.8% and transportation infrastructure made up 1.0%. A total of 39.3% of the total land area is heavily forested and 3.0% is covered with orchards or small clusters of trees. Of the agricultural land, 3.4% is used for growing crops and 13.7% is pasturage and 20.0% is used for alpine pastures. All the water in the municipality is flowing water. Of the unproductive areas, 9.9% is unproductive vegetation and 4.4% is too rocky for vegetation.

It lies on the northern side of the Stockhorn mountains in the lower end of the Stockental valley. Like most of the canton of Bern, it is German-speaking.

On 31 December 2009 Amtsbezirk Thun, the municipality's former district, was dissolved. On the following day, 1 January 2010, it joined the newly created Verwaltungskreis Thun.

== Coat of arms ==
The blazon of the municipal coat of arms is Argent a Fir Tree Vert trunked and eradicated Gules on a Mount of 3 Coupeaux Sable.

== Demographics ==
Pohlern has a population (as of December 2020) of 232. As of 2012, 5.3% of the population are resident foreign nationals. Between the last 2 years (2010-2012) the population changed at a rate of -1.5%. Migration accounted for -1.9%, while births and deaths accounted for 0.0%.

Most of the population (as of 2000) speaks German (226 or 100.0%) as their first language with the rest speaking French.

As of 2008, the population was 54.3% male and 45.7% female. The population was made up of 135 Swiss men (50.6% of the population) and 10 (3.7%) non-Swiss men. There were 118 Swiss women (44.2%) and 4 (1.5%) non-Swiss women. Of the population in the municipality, 71 or about 31.4% were born in Pohlern and lived there in 2000. There were 124 or 54.9% who were born in the same canton, while 14 or 6.2% were born somewhere else in Switzerland, and 3 or 1.3% were born outside of Switzerland.

As of 2012, children and teenagers (0–19 years old) make up 24.0% of the population, while adults (20–64 years old) make up 58.9% and seniors (over 64 years old) make up 17.1%.

As of 2000, there were 102 people who were single and never married in the municipality. There were 97 married individuals, 12 widows or widowers and 15 individuals who are divorced.

As of 2010, there were 33 households that consist of only one person and 10 households with five or more people. In 2000, a total of 91 apartments (90.1% of the total) were permanently occupied, while 4 apartments (4.0%) were seasonally occupied and 6 apartments (5.9%) were empty. The vacancy rate for the municipality, in 2013, was 3.3%. In 2012, single family homes made up 37.2% of the total housing in the municipality.

The historical population is given in the following chart:

== Economy ==
As of 2011, Pohlern had an unemployment rate of 0.24%. As of 2011, there were a total of 68 people employed in the municipality. Of these, there were 31 people employed in the primary economic sector and about 10 businesses involved in this sector. The secondary sector employs 11 people and there were 3 businesses in this sector. The tertiary sector employs 26 people, with 9 businesses in this sector. There were 137 residents of the municipality who were employed in some capacity, of which females made up 40.9% of the workforce.

In 2008 there were a total of 46 full-time equivalent jobs. The number of jobs in the primary sector was 22, all of which were in agriculture. The number of jobs in the secondary sector was 8 of which 7 or (87.5%) were in manufacturing and 1 was in construction. The number of jobs in the tertiary sector was 16. In the tertiary sector; 8 were in a hotel or restaurant, 3 were in education and 4 were in health care.

In 2000, there were 13 workers who commuted into the municipality and 99 workers who commuted away. The municipality is a net exporter of workers, with about 7.6 workers leaving the municipality for every one entering. A total of 38 workers (74.5% of the 51 total workers in the municipality) both lived and worked in Pohlern. Of the working population, 5.1% used public transportation to get to work, and 61.3% used a private car.

The local and cantonal tax rate in Pohlern is one of the lowest in the canton. In 2012 the average local and cantonal tax rate on a married resident, with two children, of Pohlern making 150,000 CHF was 12.2%, while an unmarried resident's rate was 18.2%. For comparison, the average rate for the entire canton in 2011, was 14.2% and 22.0%, while the nationwide average was 12.3% and 21.1% respectively.

In 2010 there were a total of 114 tax payers in the municipality. Of that total, 21 made over 75,000 CHF per year. There were 2 people who made between 15,000 and 20,000 per year. The greatest number of workers, 42, made between 50,000 and 75,000 CHF per year. The average income of the over 75,000 CHF group in Pohlern was 111,657 CHF, while the average across all of Switzerland was 131,244 CHF.

In 2011 a total of 1.2% of the population received direct financial assistance from the government.

== Heritage sites of national significance ==
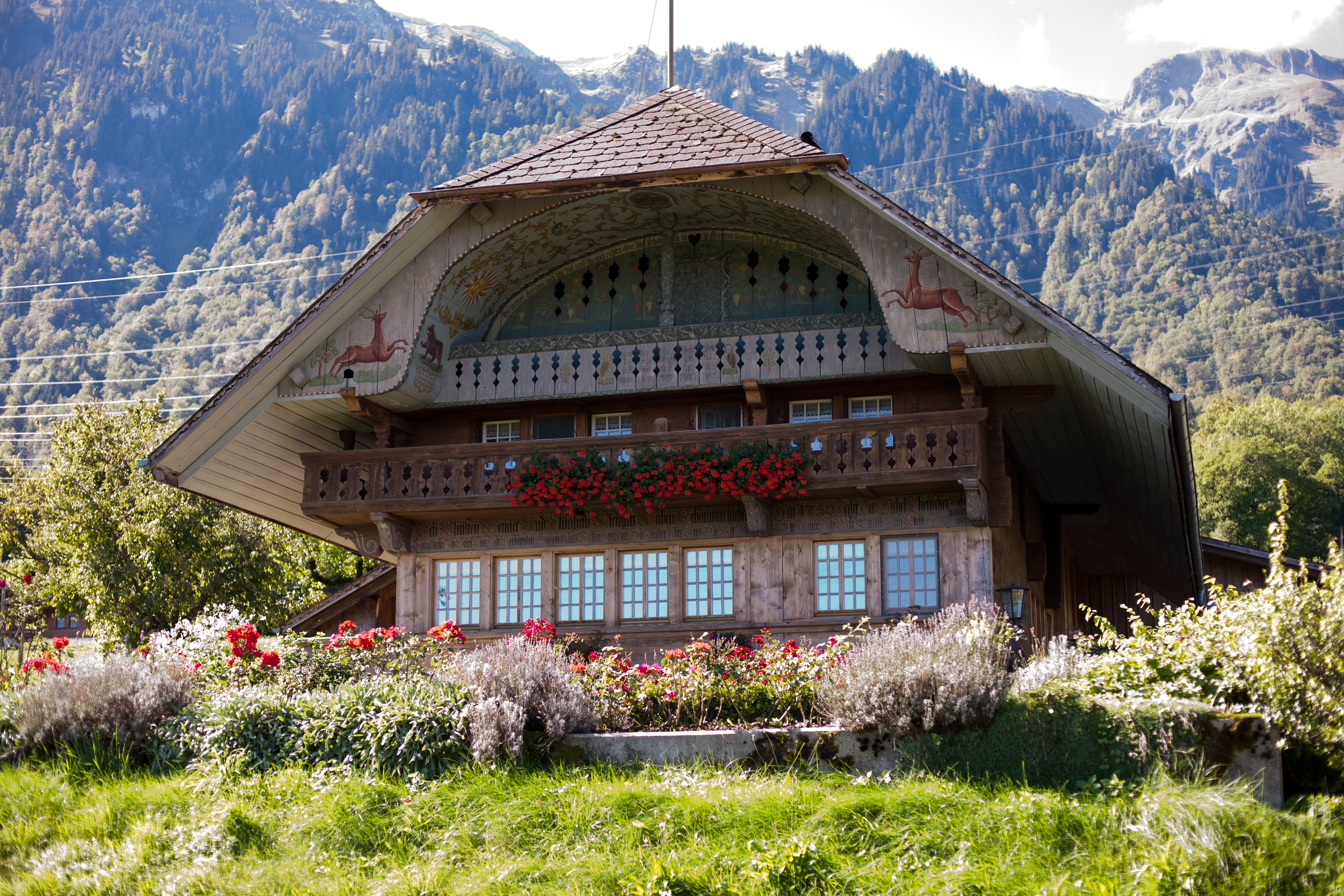
Farm House Mättli at Mettli 23

The farm house in Rohrmoos at Rohrmooshof 3 and the farm house Mättli at Mettli 23 are listed as Swiss heritage site of national significance.

== Politics ==
In the 2011 federal election the most popular party was the Swiss People's Party (SVP) which received 61.6% of the vote. The next three most popular parties were the Conservative Democratic Party (BDP) (17.3%), another local party (6.0%) and the FDP.The Liberals (3.8%). In the federal election, a total of 96 votes were cast, and the voter turnout was 46.4%.

== Religion ==
From the 2000 census, 197 or 87.2% belonged to the Swiss Reformed Church, while 3 or 1.3% were Roman Catholic. Of the rest of the population, there were 7 individuals (or about 3.10% of the population) who belonged to another Christian church. 10 (or about 4.42% of the population) belonged to no church, are agnostic or atheist, and 9 individuals (or about 3.98% of the population) did not answer the question.

== Education ==
In Pohlern about 53.5% of the population have completed non-mandatory upper secondary education, and 11.6% have completed additional higher education (either university or a Fachhochschule). Of the 16 who had completed some form of tertiary schooling listed in the census, 75.0% were Swiss men, 25.0% were Swiss women.

The Canton of Bern school system provides one year of non-obligatory Kindergarten, followed by six years of Primary school. This is followed by three years of obligatory lower Secondary school where the students are separated according to ability and aptitude. Following the lower Secondary students may attend additional schooling or they may enter an apprenticeship.

During the 2012–13 school year, there were a total of 24 students attending classes in Pohlern. There were a total of 54 students in the German language kindergarten classes in the municipality. Of the kindergarten students, 13.0% were permanent or temporary residents of Switzerland (not citizens) and 42.6% have a different mother language than the classroom language. The municipality's primary school had 24 students in German language classes. Of the primary students, 8.3% were permanent or temporary residents of Switzerland (not citizens) and 8.3% have a different mother language than the classroom language. The remainder of the students attend a private or special school.

As of 2000, there were a total of 16 students attending any school in the municipality. Of those, 15 both lived and attended school in the municipality, while one student came from another municipality. During the same year, 12 residents attended schools outside the municipality.
