= Amsoldingen =

- Municipality
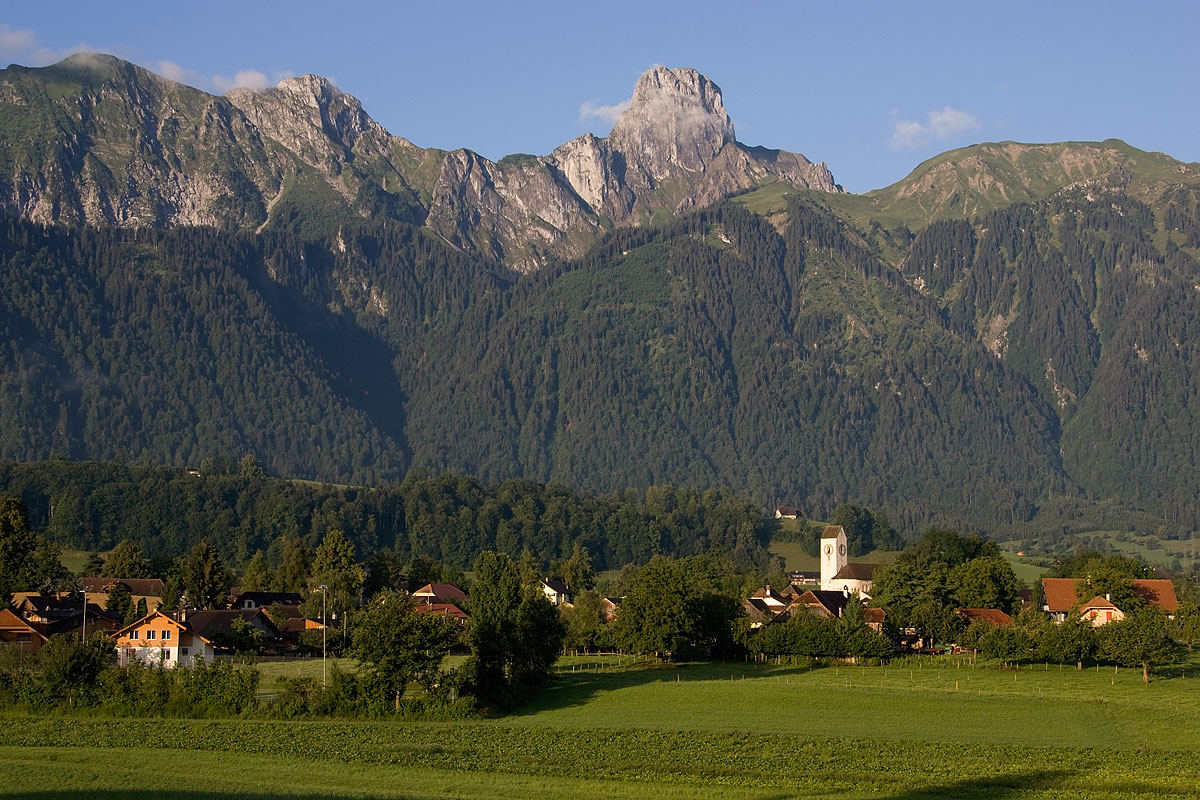
- Amsoldingen beneath the Stockhorn.

- Flag Coat of arms
- Location of Amsoldingen
- Location within Switzerland Location within Canton of Bern
- Coordinates: 46°44′N 7°35′E
- Country: Switzerland
- Canton: Bern
- District: Thun administrative district

Government
  - Mayor: Stefan Gyger

Area
  - Total: 4.7 km^{2} (1.8 sq mi)
- Elevation: 637 m (2,090 ft)

Population (Dec 2012)
  - Total: 788
  - Density: 170/km^{2} (430/sq mi)
- Time zone: UTC+01:00 (CET)
  - Summer (DST): UTC+02:00 (CEST)
- Postal code: 3633
- SFOS number: 921
- ISO 3166 code: CH-BE
- Surrounded by: Höfen, Thierachern, Thun, Uebeschi, Zwieselberg
- Website: www.amsoldingen.ch

Amsoldingen is a municipality in the Thun administrative district in the canton of Bern in Switzerland.

== History ==
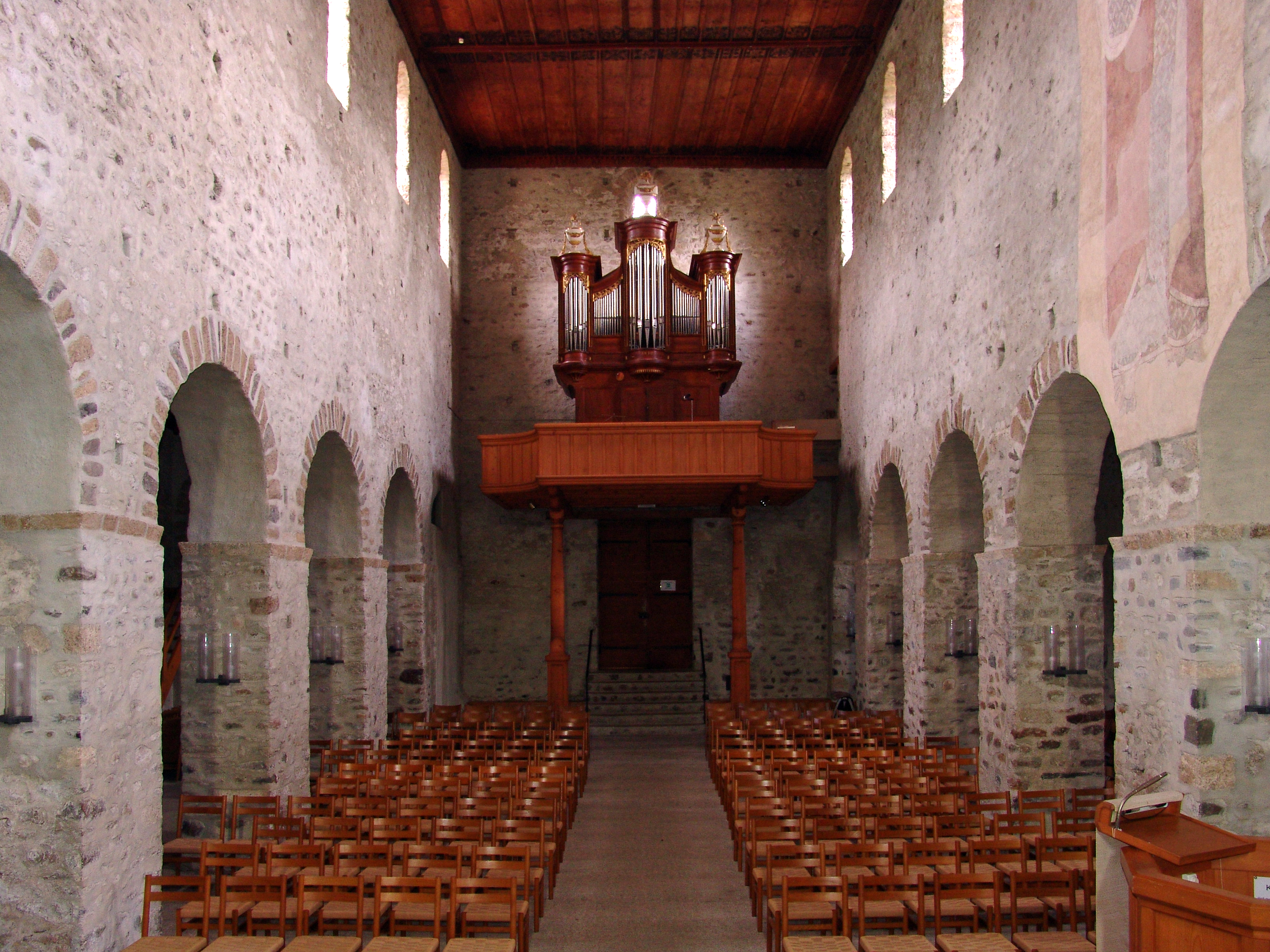
Interior of Amsoldingen Church

Amsoldingen is first mentioned in 1175 as Ansoltingen.

The oldest trace of a settlement in the area are the remains of a possibly neolithic settlement near Schmittmoos. During the Bronze Age there was a village on the Bürgli. The Swiss heritage site, St. Mauritius collegiate, was first built about 700. The early church was replaced with a pre-Romanesque church built in the 10th and 11th centuries from stone scavenged from the Roman ruins at Aventicum. A number of out buildings, a castle and a village grew up around the church. The college of canons at the church ruled over the village during the Middle Ages, but gradually lost power as Bern expanded into the region. Over the following centuries, the college of canons gradually became impoverished and in 1484 the Pope approved the dissolution of the college and its incorporation into the newly created college of canons of St. Vincent's cathedral in Bern.

Following the 1798 French invasion, Amsoldingen became part of the Helvetic Republic district of Oberseftigen. Following the collapse of the Republic and 1803 Act of Mediation it was assigned to the Thun District. The original Thun district was dissolved in 2010 and Amsoldingen joined the new, larger Verwaltungskreis Thun.

The municipality has become a commuter town of Thun, with most residents commuting to jobs outside Amsoldingen. Several new residential areas, including Riedli and Galgacher, were built in 1985 to house the slowly growing population. In 1990 about 28% of the local jobs were in agriculture and 26% were in manufacturing, with the remainder in the services industry.

== Geography ==
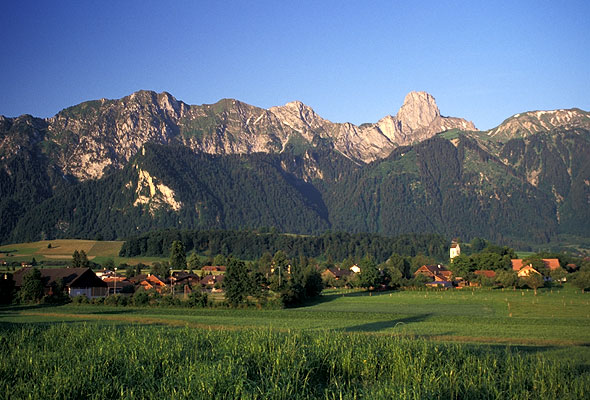
Amsoldingen village and the surrounding mountains

Aerial view (1952)

Amsoldingen has an area of 4.71 km^{2} (1.82 sq mi). As of 2012, a total of 2.84 km^{2} (1.10 mi^{2}) or 60.3% was used for agricultural purposes, while 1.03 km^{2} (0.40 mi^{2}) or 21.9% is forested. The rest of the municipality is 0.35 km^{2} (0.14 mi^{2}) or 7.4% is settled (buildings or roads), 0.4 km^{2} (0.15 mi^{2}) or 8.5% is either rivers or lakes and 0.07 km^{2} (17 acres) or 1.5% is unproductive land.

During the same year, housing and buildings made up 5.1% and transportation infrastructure made up 2.1%. A total of 20.4% of the total land area is heavily forested and 1.5% is covered with orchards or small clusters of trees. Of the agricultural land, 28.7% is used for growing crops and 27.6% is pasturage, while 4.0% is used for orchards or vine crops. All the water in the municipality is in lakes.

The village is located approximately 5 kilometers from the city of Thun. The municipality includes the village of Amsoldingen on the Amsoldingersee and scattered farm houses and hamlets. The parish, however, also includes the municipalities of Höfen, Längenbühl and Zwieselberg.

On 31 December 2009 Amtsbezirk Thun, the municipality's former district, was dissolved. On the following day, 1 January 2010, it joined the newly created Verwaltungskreis Thun.

Two lakes, Amsoldingersee and Uebeschisee, are located adjacent to the municipality.

== Coat of arms ==
The blazon of the municipal coat of arms is Azure a Buckle Or.

== Demographics ==
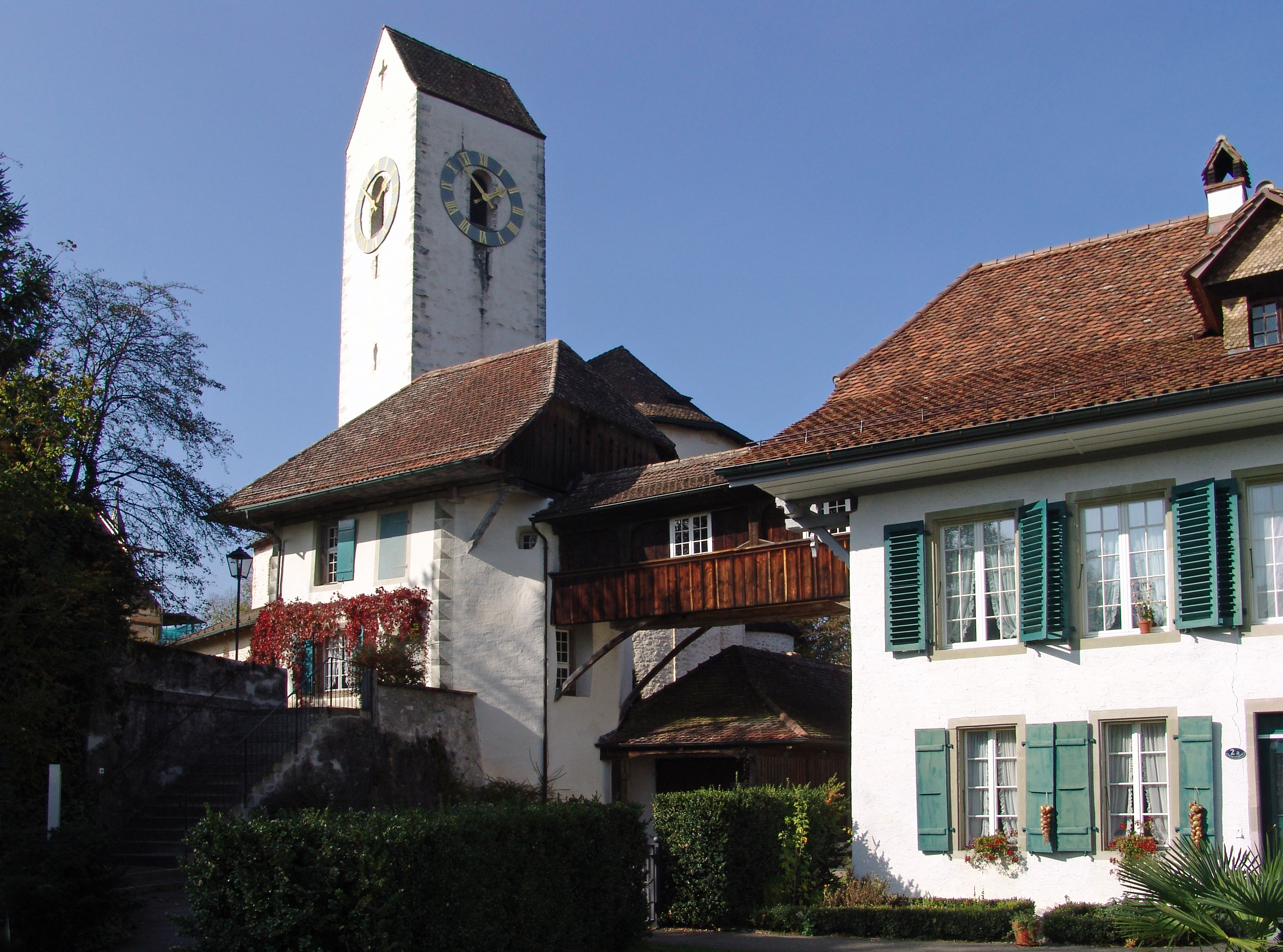
Amsoldingen Church and rectory

Amsoldingen has a population (as of December 2020) of 800. As of 2012, 1.9% of the population are resident foreign nationals. Between the last 2 years (2010-2012) the population changed at a rate of -2.1%. Migration accounted for -2.4%, while births and deaths accounted for 0.5%.

Most of the population (as of 2000) speaks German (741 or 96.6%) as their first language, both French and Albanian have 5 native speakers. There are 2 people who speak Italian.

As of 2008, the population was 50.3% male and 49.7% female. The population was made up of 395 Swiss men (49.1% of the population) and 10 (1.2%) non-Swiss men. There were 395 Swiss women (49.1%) and 5 (0.6%) non-Swiss women. Of the population in the municipality, 271 or about 35.3% were born in Amsoldingen and lived there in 2000. There were 366 or 47.7% who were born in the same canton, while 77 or 10.0% were born somewhere else in Switzerland, and 39 or 5.1% were born outside of Switzerland.

As of 2012, children and teenagers (0–19 years old) make up 22.2% of the population, while adults (20–64 years old) make up 58.4% and seniors (over 64 years old) make up 19.4%.

As of 2000, there were 305 people who were single and never married in the municipality. There were 389 married individuals, 54 widows or widowers and 19 individuals who are divorced.

As of 2010, there were 78 households that consist of only one person and 22 households with five or more people. In 2000, a total of 286 apartments (91.1% of the total) were permanently occupied, while 16 apartments (5.1%) were seasonally occupied and 12 apartments (3.8%) were empty. The vacancy rate for the municipality, in 2013, was 0.8%. In 2012, single family homes made up 49.8% of the total housing in the municipality.

The historical population is given in the following chart:

== Economy ==
As of 2011, Amsoldingen had an unemployment rate of 1.18%. As of 2011, there were a total of 170 people employed in the municipality. Of these, there were 42 people employed in the primary economic sector and about 16 businesses involved in this sector. 21 people were employed in the secondary sector and there were 11 businesses in this sector. 107 people were employed in the tertiary sector, with 34 businesses in this sector. There were 386 residents of the municipality who were employed in some capacity, of which females made up 42.0% of the workforce.

In 2008 there were a total of 97 full-time equivalent jobs. The number of jobs in the primary sector was 32, all of which were in agriculture. The number of jobs in the secondary sector was 25 of which 18 or (72.0%) were in manufacturing and 8 (32.0%) were in construction. The number of jobs in the tertiary sector was 40. In the tertiary sector; 1 was in wholesale or retail sales or the repair of motor vehicles, 5 or 12.5% were in the movement and storage of goods, 7 or 17.5% were in a hotel or restaurant, 6 or 15.0% were technical professionals or scientists, 4 or 10.0% were in education and 11 or 27.5% were in health care.

In 2000, there were 39 workers who commuted into the municipality and 285 workers who commuted away. The municipality is a net exporter of workers, with about 7.3 workers leaving the municipality for every one entering. A total of 101 workers (72.1% of the 140 total workers in the municipality) both lived and worked in Amsoldingen. Of the working population, 13.7% used public transportation to get to work, and 53.9% used a private car.

The local and cantonal tax rate in Amsoldingen is one of the lowest in the canton. In 2012 the average local and cantonal tax rate on a married resident, with two children, of Amsoldingen making 150,000 CHF was 12.2%, while an unmarried resident's rate was 18.3%. For comparison, the average rate for the entire canton in 2011, was 14.2% and 22.0%, while the nationwide average was 12.3% and 21.1% respectively.

In 2010 there were a total of 355 tax payers in the municipality. Of that total, 138 made over 75,000 CHF per year. There were 2 people who made between 15,000 and 20,000 per year. The average income of the over 75,000 CHF group in Amsoldingen was 108,641 CHF, while the average across all of Switzerland was 131,244 CHF.

In 2011 a total of 3.3% of the population received direct financial assistance from the government.

== Heritage sites of national significance ==
The former collegiate Church of St Mauritius and adjacent Amsoldingen Castle are listed as Swiss heritage sites of national significance.

Amsoldingen Church (in German: Kirche Amsoldingen), is the largest Ottonian basilica in the country. The heritage site includes the church, the refectory, sexton's house and the castle.

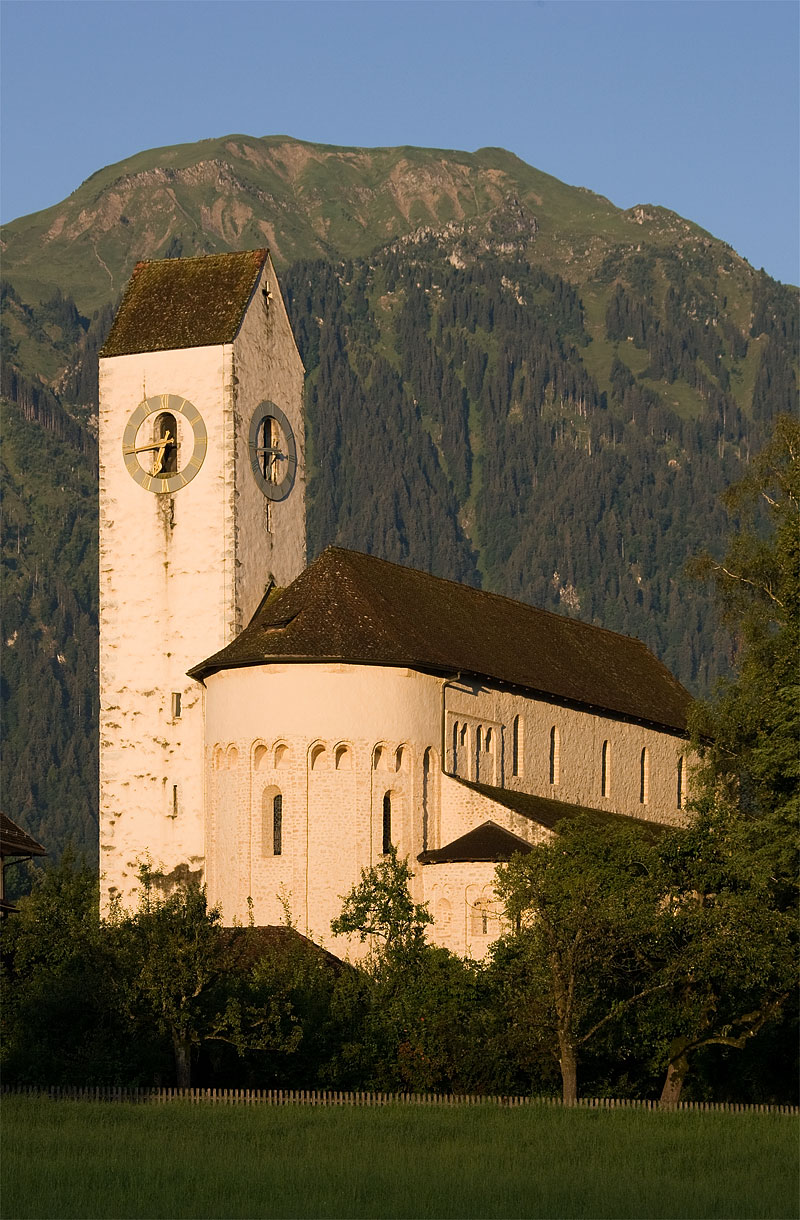
The Amsoldingen Church.

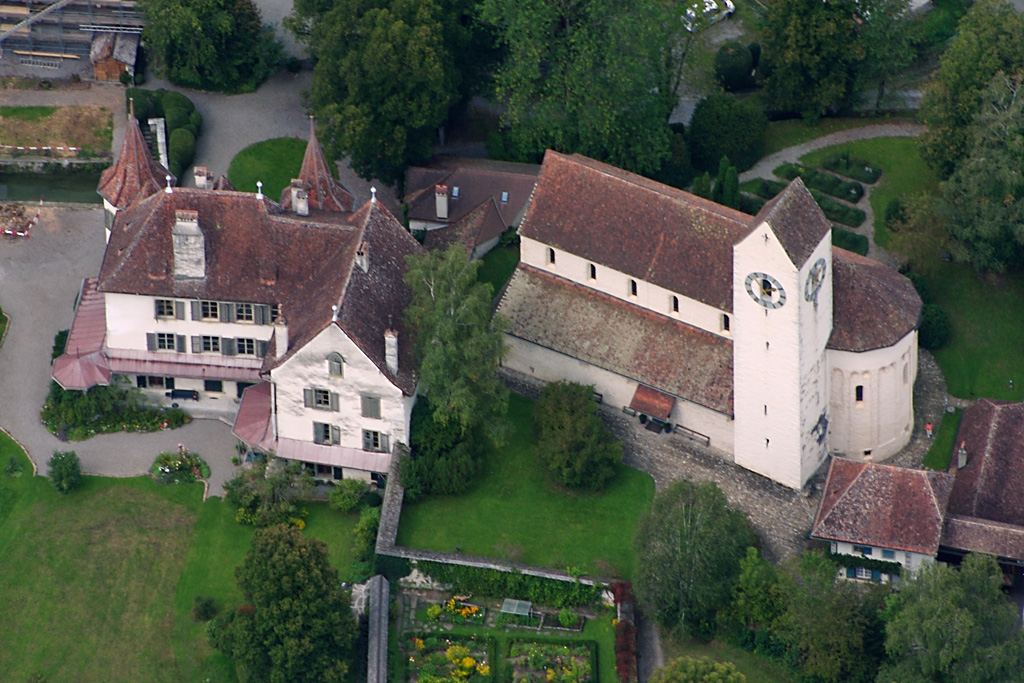
Castle and church of Amsoldingen.

== Politics ==
In the 2011 federal election the most popular party was the Swiss People's Party (SVP) which received 46.0% of the vote. The next three most popular parties were the Conservative Democratic Party (BDP) (13.7%), the Social Democratic Party (SP) (12.1%) and the Green Party (6.7%). In the federal election, a total of 326 votes were cast, and the voter turnout was 49.8%.

== Religion ==
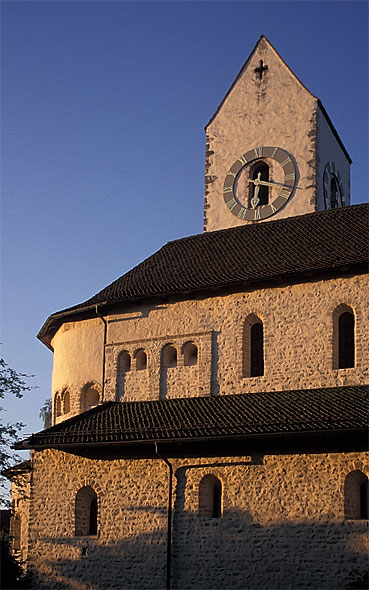
Former collegiate church of Amsoldingen

From the 2000 census, 638 or 83.2% belonged to the Swiss Reformed Church, while 51 or 6.6% were Roman Catholic. Of the rest of the population, there was 1 member of an Orthodox church, and there were 29 individuals (or about 3.78% of the population) who belonged to another Christian church. There were 5 (or about 0.65% of the population) who were Muslim. There was 1 person who was Buddhist and 5 individuals who were Hindu. 25 (or about 3.26% of the population) belonged to no church, are agnostic or atheist, and 12 individuals (or about 1.56% of the population) did not answer the question.

== Education ==
In Amsoldingen about 64.9% of the population have completed non-mandatory upper secondary education, and 18.2% have completed additional higher education (either university or a Fachhochschule). Of the 86 who had completed some form of tertiary schooling listed in the census, 70.9% were Swiss men, 22.1% were Swiss women.

The Canton of Bern school system provides one year of non-obligatory Kindergarten, followed by six years of Primary school. This is followed by three years of obligatory lower Secondary school where the students are separated according to ability and aptitude. Following the lower Secondary students may attend additional schooling or they may enter an apprenticeship.

During the 2012–13 school year, there were a total of 95 students attending classes in Amsoldingen. There were a total of 26 students in the German language kindergarten classes in the municipality. Of the kindergarten students, 7.7% have a different mother language than the classroom language. The municipality's primary school had 69 students in German language classes. Of the primary students, 1.4% were permanent or temporary residents of Switzerland (not citizens) and 1.4% have a different mother language than the classroom language.

As of 2000, there were a total of 25 students attending any school in the municipality. Of those, 25 both lived and attended school in the municipality, while 92 students from Amsoldingen attended schools outside the municipality.
