= Reutigen =

- Municipality
- Flag Coat of arms
- Location of Reutigen
- Location within Switzerland Location within Canton of Bern
- Coordinates: 46°41′N 7°37′E
- Country: Switzerland
- Canton: Bern
- District: Thun

Area
  - Total: 11.3 km^{2} (4.4 sq mi)
- Elevation: 622 m (2,041 ft)

Population (Dec 2011)
  - Total: 962
  - Density: 85.1/km^{2} (220/sq mi)
- Time zone: UTC+01:00 (CET)
  - Summer (DST): UTC+02:00 (CEST)
- Postal code: 3647
- SFOS number: 767
- ISO 3166 code: CH-BE
- Surrounded by: Erlenbach im Simmental, Höfen, Niederstocken, Spiez, Wimmis, Zwieselberg
- Website: www.reutigen.ch

Reutigen (Swiss Standard German pronunciation: [ˈrɔʏtɪgn̩]) is a municipality in the administrative district of Thun in the canton of Bern in Switzerland. On 1 January 2024 the former municipality of Zwieselberg merged to form the municipality of Reutigen.

== History ==
Reutigen is first mentioned about 1300 as Rötingen.

Around 1308 the Burgistein family acquired the entire Strättligen Herrschaft which included Reutigen. In the following decades, the village passed through the hands of several other local nobles. Around 1486 and 1494, the Bubenberg and Schütz families sold their respective portions of the village to the city of Bern. Under Bernese rule the village was placed under the military authority of Seftigen and under the jurisdiction of the Vogt of Wimmis. Its political situation remained unchanged for centuries, until the 1803 Act of Mediation, when it joined the Niedersimmental District. The village remained generally agrarian into the 20th century. As of 2005, almost one-third of all jobs in the municipality are in agriculture, while half are in the services sector. However, many residents commute to jobs in Thun, Spiez or Bern.

The village St. Mary's Chapel was probably built in the 12th century, but is first mentioned in a record in 1330. The ossuary probably dates from around the same time. The interior frescoes are from the 14th and 15th centuries. In 1412 it became a filial church of the parish in Wimmis. Then, in 1474 it became the parish church of the Reutigen parish.

== Geography ==
Aerial view (1967)

Reutigen has an area of 11.29 km^{2} (4.36 sq mi). As of 2012, a total of 5.28 km^{2} (2.04 mi^{2}) or 46.8% is used for agricultural purposes, while 5.11 km^{2} (1.97 mi^{2}) or 45.3% is forested. The rest of the municipality is 0.51 km^{2} (0.20 mi^{2}) or 4.5% is settled (buildings or roads), 0.11 km^{2} (27 acres) or 1.0% is either rivers or lakes and 0.27 km^{2} (0.10 mi^{2}) or 2.4% is unproductive land.

During the same year, housing and buildings made up 2.2% and transportation infrastructure made up 1.4%. A total of 43.2% of the total land area is heavily forested and 2.1% is covered with orchards or small clusters of trees. Of the agricultural land, 11.7% is used for growing crops and 23.2% is pasturage and 11.2% is used for alpine pastures. All the water in the municipality is flowing water. Of the unproductive areas, and 1.9% is too rocky for vegetation.

The municipality is located in the Niedersimmental and includes the village of Reutigen, Hani and Allmi. It runs from the north-east side of the Stockhorn chain down to the Kander river.

On 31 December 2009 Amtsbezirk Niedersimmental, the municipality's former district, was dissolved. On the following day, 1 January 2010, it joined the newly created Verwaltungskreis Thun.

== Demographics ==
Reutigen has a population (as of December 2020) of 1,023. As of 2010, 3.3% of the population are resident foreign nationals. Over the last 10 years (2001–2011) the population has changed at a rate of 0.4%. Migration accounted for 0.6%, while births and deaths accounted for 0.2%.

Most of the population (as of 2000) speaks German (887 or 97.6%) as their first language, Albanian is the second most common (5 or 0.6%) and French is the third (3 or 0.3%). There are 3 people who speak Italian and 3 people who speak Romansh.

As of 2008, the population was 49.5% male and 50.5% female. The population was made up of 457 Swiss men (47.7% of the population) and 17 (1.8%) non-Swiss men. There were 469 Swiss women (49.0%) and 15 (1.6%) non-Swiss women. Of the population in the municipality, 343 or about 37.7% were born in Reutigen and lived there in 2000. There were 408 or 44.9% who were born in the same canton, while 95 or 10.5% were born somewhere else in Switzerland, and 45 or 5.0% were born outside of Switzerland.

As of 2011, children and teenagers (0–19 years old) make up 19.4% of the population, while adults (20–64 years old) make up 60.4% and seniors (over 64 years old) make up 20.2%.

As of 2000, there were 379 people who were single and never married in the municipality. There were 455 married individuals, 42 widows or widowers and 33 individuals who are divorced.

As of 2010, there were 118 households that consist of only one person and 20 households with five or more people. In 2000, a total of 355 apartments (88.3% of the total) were permanently occupied, while 30 apartments (7.5%) were seasonally occupied and 17 apartments (4.2%) were empty. The vacancy rate for the municipality, in 2012, was 3.6%. In 2011, single family homes made up 49.7% of the total housing in the municipality.

The historical population is given in the following chart:

== Politics ==
In the 2011 federal election the most popular party was the Swiss People's Party (SVP) which received 42.6% of the vote. The next three most popular parties were the Conservative Democratic Party (BDP) (22.5%), the Social Democratic Party (SP) (9.2%) and the Green Party (5%). In the federal election, a total of 428 votes were cast, and the voter turnout was 55.7%.

== Economy ==
As of 2011, Reutigen had an unemployment rate of 0.83%. As of 2008, there were a total of 230 people employed in the municipality. Of these, there were 63 people employed in the primary economic sector and about 19 businesses involved in this sector. 52 people were employed in the secondary sector and there were 9 businesses in this sector. 115 people were employed in the tertiary sector, with 23 businesses in this sector. There were 459 residents of the municipality who were employed in some capacity, of which females made up 41.2% of the workforce.

In 2008 there were a total of 181 full-time equivalent jobs. The number of jobs in the primary sector was 44, of which 40 were in agriculture and 4 were in forestry or lumber production. The number of jobs in the secondary sector was 45 of which 32 or (71.1%) were in manufacturing and 13 (28.9%) were in construction. The number of jobs in the tertiary sector was 92. In the tertiary sector; 51 or 55.4% were in wholesale or retail sales or the repair of motor vehicles, 4 or 4.3% were in the movement and storage of goods, 13 or 14.1% were in a hotel or restaurant, 1 was the insurance or financial industry, 2 or 2.2% were technical professionals or scientists, 9 or 9.8% were in education.

In 2000, there were 78 workers who commuted into the municipality and 316 workers who commuted away. The municipality is a net exporter of workers, with about 4.1 workers leaving the municipality for every one entering. A total of 143 workers (64.7% of the 221 total workers in the municipality) both lived and worked in Reutigen. Of the working population, 11.8% used public transportation to get to work, and 54% used a private car.

In 2011 the average local and cantonal tax rate on a married resident, with two children, of Reutigen making 150,000 CHF was 12.6%, while an unmarried resident's rate was 18.5%. For comparison, the average rate for the entire canton in the same year, was 14.2% and 22.0%, while the nationwide average was 12.3% and 21.1% respectively. In 2009 there were a total of 440 tax payers in the municipality. Of that total, 121 made over 75,000 CHF per year. There were 4 people who made between 15,000 and 20,000 per year. The greatest number of workers, 148, made between 50,000 and 75,000 CHF per year. The average income of the over 75,000 CHF group in Reutigen was 101,445 CHF, while the average across all of Switzerland was 130,478 CHF.

In 2011 a total of 2.2% of the population received direct financial assistance from the government.

== Religion ==
From the 2000 census, 753 or 82.8% belonged to the Swiss Reformed Church, while 64 or 7.0% were Roman Catholic. Of the rest of the population, there was 1 individual who belongs to the Christian Catholic Church, and there were 13 individuals (or about 1.43% of the population) who belonged to another Christian church. There were 8 (or about 0.88% of the population) who were Islamic. There were 5 individuals who were Buddhist. 50 (or about 5.50% of the population) belonged to no church, are agnostic or atheist, and 15 individuals (or about 1.65% of the population) did not answer the question.

== Education ==
In Reutigen about 61.7% of the population have completed non-mandatory upper secondary education, and 17.6% have completed additional higher education (either university or a Fachhochschule). Of the 97 who had completed some form of tertiary schooling listed in the census, 78.4% were Swiss men, 19.6% were Swiss women.

The Canton of Bern school system provides one year of non-obligatory Kindergarten, followed by six years of Primary school. This is followed by three years of obligatory lower Secondary school where the students are separated according to ability and aptitude. Following the lower Secondary students may attend additional schooling or they may enter an apprenticeship.

During the 2011–12 school year, there were a total of 87 students attending classes in Reutigen. There was one kindergarten class with a total of 17 students in the municipality. The municipality had 2 primary classes and 41 students. Of the primary students, 2.4% were permanent or temporary residents of Switzerland (not citizens) and 7.3% have a different mother language than the classroom language. During the same year, there were 2 lower secondary classes with a total of 29 students. 3.4% have a different mother language than the classroom language.

As of 2000, there were a total of 125 students attending any school in the municipality. Of those, 96 both lived and attended school in the municipality, while 29 students came from another municipality. During the same year, 46 residents attended schools outside the municipality.

Reutigen is home to the Schul- und Gemeindebibliothek Reutigen (municipal library of Reutigen). The library has (as of 2008) 5,043 books or other media, and loaned out 5,560 items in the same year. It was open a total of 144 days with average of 4 hours per week during that year.
