= Uebeschi =

- Municipality
- Flag Coat of arms
- Location of Uebeschi
- Location within Switzerland Location within Canton of Bern
- Coordinates: 46°44′N 7°33′E
- Country: Switzerland
- Canton: Bern
- District: Thun

Government
  - Mayor: Mathias Brülisauer

Area
  - Total: 4.4 km^{2} (1.7 sq mi)
- Elevation: 685 m (2,247 ft)

Population (Dec 2012)
  - Total: 668
  - Density: 150/km^{2} (390/sq mi)
- Time zone: UTC+01:00 (CET)
  - Summer (DST): UTC+02:00 (CEST)
- Postal code: 3635
- SFOS number: 943
- ISO 3166 code: CH-BE
- Surrounded by: Amsoldingen, Blumenstein, Höfen, Längenbühl, Pohlern, Thierachern
- Website: www.uebeschi.ch

Uebeschi is a municipality in the administrative district of Thun in the canton of Bern in Switzerland.

== History ==
Uebeschi is first mentioned in 1233 as Ibisshe.

The oldest traces of settlements in the area come from scattered neolithic and Bronze Age artifacts. Part of a wall, ceramic floor tiles, a stone path and coins have been found from the Roman era, indicating that there was a small settlement in the area.

During the Middle Ages the village was part of the court and parish of Thierachern in the Strättligen Herrschaft. While there is a Ministerialis (unfree knights in the service of a feudal overlord) family von Uebeschi, there are no records that connect them to the village. In 1417 the village was donated to the mendicant Franciscan friars in Bern. In 1528 Bern adopted the new faith of the Protestant Reformation and secularized all the property of the friars. Under Bernese rule, Uebeschi became part of the low court of Amsoldingen in the district of Thun.

Traditionally the village economy relied on farming and raising cattle. Today, agriculture remains important but about half of the working population commutes to jobs in Bern, Thun or other nearby towns.

== Geography ==
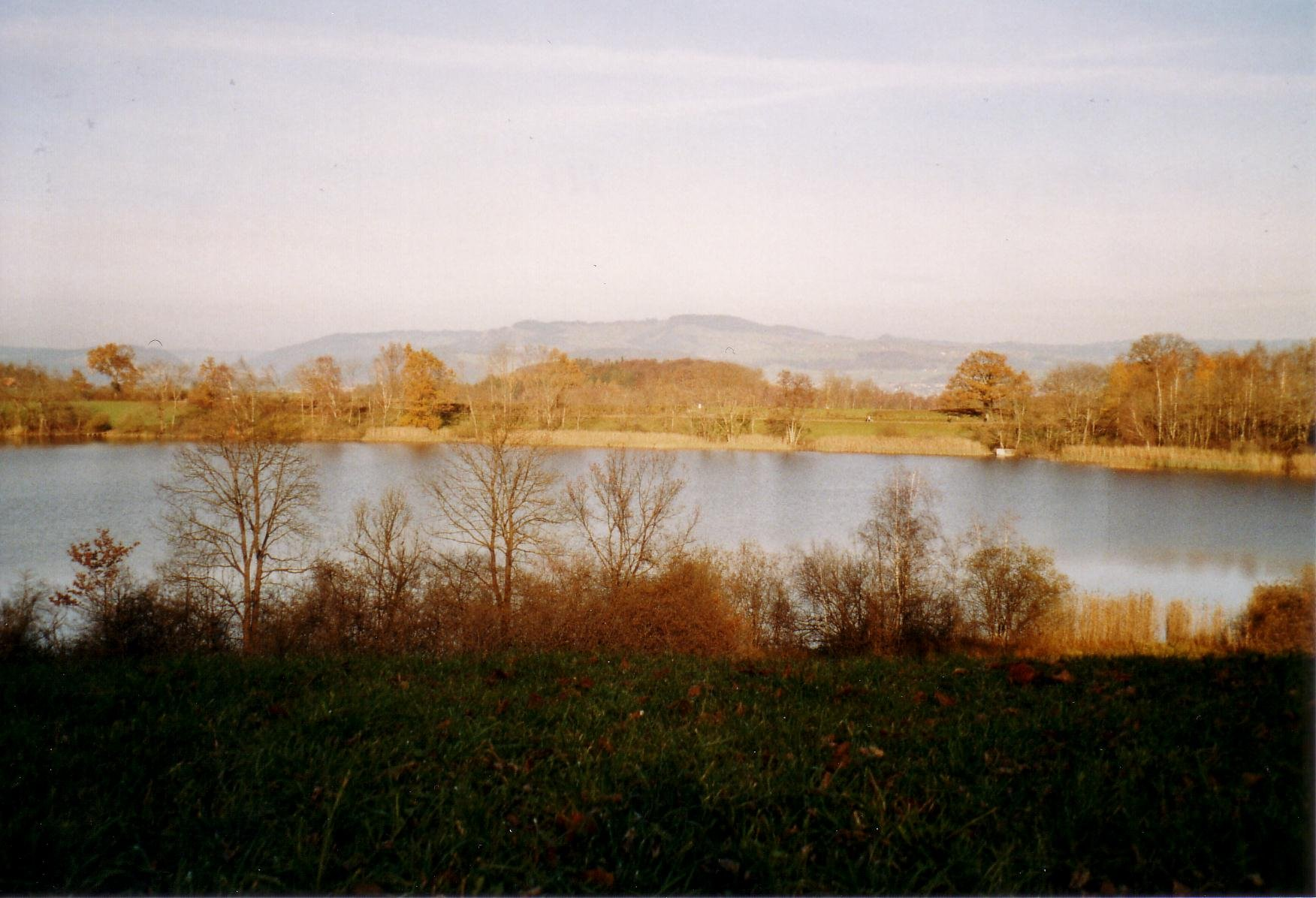
Lake Uebeschi, looking toward the east

Uebeschi has an area of 4.42 km^{2} (1.71 sq mi). As of the 2004 survey, a total of 3.92 km^{2} (1.51 mi^{2}) or 89.1% is used for agricultural purposes, while 0.11 km^{2} (0.042 mi^{2}) or 2.5% is forested. Of rest of the municipality 0.32 km^{2} (0.12 mi^{2}) or 7.3% is settled (buildings or roads), 0.01 km^{2} (2.5 acres) or 0.2% is either rivers or lakes and 0.02 km^{2} (4.9 acres) or 0.5% is unproductive land. Between the 1981 and 2004 surveys the settled area increased from 0.23 km^{2} (0.089 mi^{2}) to 0.32 km^{2} (0.12 mi^{2}), an increase of 39.13%.

From the same survey, housing and buildings made up 4.5% and transportation infrastructure made up 2.3%. A total of 1.1% of the total land area is heavily forested and 1.4% is covered with orchards or small clusters of trees. Of the agricultural land, 43.0% is used for growing crops and 43.0% is pasturage, while 3.2% is used for orchards or vine crops. All the water in the municipality is in lakes.

It lies some 6 km (3.7 mi) to the southwest of the district capital Thun. It is located in the drumlin landscape between the Stocken valley and Aare valley.

It consists of the village of Uebeschi, the hamlet of Kärselen and scattered farmhouses. Lake Uebeschi after which the village is named lies several hundred meters to the south, however a greater part of it belongs to the neighboring municipalities of Amsoldingen and Höfen.

On 31 December 2009 Amtsbezirk Thun, the municipality's former district, was dissolved. On the following day, 1 January 2010, it joined the newly created Verwaltungskreis Thun.

== Coat of arms ==
The blazon of the municipal coat of arms is Azure three Mullets Argent.

== Demographics ==
Uebeschi has a population (as of December 2020) of 718. As of 2012, 1.3% of the population are resident foreign nationals. Between the last 2 years (2010-2012) the population changed at a rate of -3.9%. Migration accounted for -3.7%, while births and deaths accounted for 0.0%.

Most of the population (as of 2000) speaks German (660 or 97.3%) as their first language, French is the second most common (8 or 1.2%) and Albanian is the third (6 or 0.9%).

As of 2013, the population was 51.3% male and 48.7% female. The population was made up of 336 Swiss men (50.7% of the population) and 4 (0.6%) non-Swiss men. There were 319 Swiss women (48.1%) and 4 (0.6%) non-Swiss women. Of the population in the municipality, 208 or about 30.7% were born in Uebeschi and lived there in 2000. There were 351 or 51.8% who were born in the same canton, while 68 or 10.0% were born somewhere else in Switzerland, and 20 or 2.9% were born outside of Switzerland.

As of 2012, children and teenagers (0–19 years old) make up 26.8% of the population, while adults (20–64 years old) make up 54.6% and seniors (over 64 years old) make up 18.6%.

As of 2000, there were 295 people who were single and never married in the municipality. There were 329 married individuals, 32 widows or widowers and 22 individuals who are divorced.

As of 2010, there were 70 households that consist of only one person and 35 households with five or more people. In 2000, a total of 221 apartments (89.1% of the total) were permanently occupied, while 20 apartments (8.1%) were seasonally occupied and 7 apartments (2.8%) were empty. The vacancy rate for the municipality, in 2013, was 0.3%. In 2012, single family homes made up 43.3% of the total housing in the municipality.

The historical population is given in the following chart:

== Economy ==
As of 2011, Uebeschi had an unemployment rate of 0.69%. As of 2011, there were a total of 162 people employed in the municipality. Of these, there were 90 people employed in the primary economic sector and about 35 businesses involved in this sector. The secondary sector employs 28 people and there were 13 businesses in this sector. The tertiary sector employs 44 people, with 20 businesses in this sector. There were 344 residents of the municipality who were employed in some capacity, of which females made up 41.6% of the workforce.

In 2008 there were a total of 93 full-time equivalent jobs. The number of jobs in the primary sector was 56, all in agriculture. The number of jobs in the secondary sector was 17 of which 9 or (52.9%) were in manufacturing and 8 (47.1%) were in construction. The number of jobs in the tertiary sector was 20. In the tertiary sector; 1 was in wholesale or retail sales or the repair of motor vehicles, 2 or 10.0% were in a hotel or restaurant, 5 or 25.0% were in the information industry, 1 was a technical professional or scientist, 7 or 35.0% were in education and 1 was in health care.

In 2000, there were 28 workers who commuted into the municipality and 244 workers who commuted away. The municipality is a net exporter of workers, with about 8.7 workers leaving the municipality for every one entering. A total of 100 workers (78.1% of the 128 total workers in the municipality) both lived and worked in Uebeschi. Of the working population, 13.4% used public transportation to get to work, and 57% used a private car.

The local and cantonal tax rate in Uebeschi is one of the lowest in the canton. In 2012 the average local and cantonal tax rate on a married resident, with two children, of Uebeschi making 150,000 CHF was 12.5%, while an unmarried resident's rate was 18.8%. For comparison, the average rate for the entire canton in 2011, was 14.2% and 22.0%, while the nationwide average was 12.3% and 21.1% respectively.

In 2010 there were a total of 267 tax payers in the municipality. Of that total, 71 made over 75,000 CHF per year. There were 3 people who made between 15,000 and 20,000 per year. The greatest number of workers, 83, made between 50,000 and 75,000 CHF per year. The average income of the over 75,000 CHF group in Uebeschi was 104,541 CHF, while the average across all of Switzerland was 131,244 CHF.

In 2011 a total of 5.5% of the population received direct financial assistance from the government.

== Politics ==
In the 2011 federal election the most popular party was the Swiss People's Party (SVP) which received 43.6% of the vote. The next three most popular parties were the Federal Democratic Union of Switzerland (EDU) (14.3%), the Conservative Democratic Party (BDP) (13.2%) and the Social Democratic Party (SP) (8.1%). In the federal election, a total of 290 votes were cast, and the voter turnout was 56.8%.

== Religion ==
From the 2000 census, 490 or 72.3% belonged to the Swiss Reformed Church, while 33 or 4.9% were Roman Catholic. Of the rest of the population, there was 1 member of an Orthodox church, and there were 85 individuals (or about 12.54% of the population) who belonged to another Christian church. There were 7 (or about 1.03% of the population) who were Muslim. 34 (or about 5.01% of the population) belonged to no church, are agnostic or atheist, and 28 individuals (or about 4.13% of the population) did not answer the question.

== Education ==
In Uebeschi about 59.2% of the population have completed non-mandatory upper secondary education, and 13.3% have completed additional higher education (either university or a Fachhochschule). Of the 56 who had completed some form of tertiary schooling listed in the census, 78.6% were Swiss men, 19.6% were Swiss women.

The Canton of Bern school system provides one year of non-obligatory Kindergarten, followed by six years of Primary school. This is followed by three years of obligatory lower Secondary school where the students are separated according to ability and aptitude. Following the lower Secondary students may attend additional schooling or they may enter an apprenticeship.

During the 2012-13 school year, there were a total of 79 students attending classes in Uebeschi. There were a total of 11 students in the German language kindergarten classes and 68 students in German language primary classes. The secondary students go to Thierachern for their schooling.

As of 2000, there were a total of 57 students attending any school in the municipality. Of those, 49 both lived and attended school in the municipality, while 8 students came from another municipality. During the same year, 50 residents attended schools outside the municipality.
