= Thierachern =

- Municipality
- Flag Coat of arms
- Location of Thierachern
- Location within Switzerland Location within Canton of Bern
- Coordinates: 46°45′N 7°34′E
- Country: Switzerland
- Canton: Bern
- District: Thun

Government
  - Mayor: Sven Heunert

Area
  - Total: 7.5 km^{2} (2.9 sq mi)
- Elevation: 610 m (2,000 ft)

Population (Dec 2012)
  - Total: 2,350
  - Density: 310/km^{2} (810/sq mi)
- Time zone: UTC+01:00 (CET)
  - Summer (DST): UTC+02:00 (CEST)
- Postal code: 3634
- SFOS number: 941
- ISO 3166 code: CH-BE
- Surrounded by: Amsoldingen, Längenbühl, Thun, Uebeschi, Uetendorf
- Twin towns: Sezimovo Usti (Czech Republic)
- Website: www.thierachern.ch

Thierachern (Highest Alemannic: Tierachere) is a municipality in the administrative district of Thun in the canton of Bern in Switzerland.

== History ==
Thierachern is first mentioned in 1250 as Tierachern.

The area around Thierachern was occupied during the Neolithic era, the Bronze Age and the La Tène era. The remains of a Roman era settlement and graves were discovered under the village church. Additional Roman or early medieval stone lined cists were found near Egg. Other graves, of an indeterminate age, have been found in Oberen Hasliholz, by Halterain and by Wahlen. All the prehistoric artifacts indicate that the area has had a long history of human habitation.

The village first appears in historic records as a part of the Herrschaft of Strättligen. The village church of St. Martin was first mentioned in 1228 as one of the 12 Lake Thun churches in the Strättliger Chronicle. The current church dates to 1706-08 when Abraham Dünz the Younger rebuilt the old building. When the Strättligen family died out in 1349, the village was inherited and sold to several lords over the following centuries. In 1594 the von May family from Bern acquired the village. They sold it to Bern in 1607 and the village became part of the Bernese Thun District. In 1841 the village sold a large Allmend or common field (about 23% of the total land area) to the Swiss Army for a training ground for the barracks at Thun.

In the 1960s commuters began to move into the village to escape the growing city of Thun. To house the growing population several new housing developments grew up in the municipality. Today over 80% of the population commutes to jobs in Thun. Of the jobs remaining in the municipality, about 35% are in agriculture, while only 13% are in industry.

== Geography ==
Thierachern has an area of 7.53 km^{2} (2.91 sq mi). As of the 2004 survey, a total of 5.01 km^{2} (1.93 mi^{2}) or 66.6% is used for agricultural purposes, while 1.3 km^{2} (0.50 mi^{2}) or 17.3% is forested. Of rest of the municipality 0.93 km^{2} (0.36 mi^{2}) or 12.4% is settled (buildings or roads), 0.04 km^{2} (9.9 acres) or 0.5% is either rivers or lakes and 0.26 km^{2} (0.10 mi^{2}) or 3.5% is unproductive land. Between the 1981 and 2004 surveys the settled area increased from 0.7 km^{2} (0.27 mi^{2}) to 0.93 km^{2} (0.36 mi^{2}), an increase of 32.86%.

From the same survey, housing and buildings made up 6.6% and transportation infrastructure made up 4.9%. A total of 16.0% of the total land area is heavily forested and 1.3% is covered with orchards or small clusters of trees. Of the agricultural land, 41.1% is used for growing crops and 23.8% is pasturage, while 1.7% is used for orchards or vine crops. All the water in the municipality is flowing water. Of the unproductive areas, 2.4% is unproductive vegetation and 1.1% is too rocky for vegetation.

The municipality is located 5 km (3.1 mi) from downtown Thun along the Aare river. It consists of the village of Thierachern and the hamlets of Wahlen, Egg and Schwand.

On 31 December 2009 Amtsbezirk Thun, the municipality's former district, was dissolved. On the following day, 1 January 2010, it joined the newly created Verwaltungskreis Thun.

== Coat of arms ==
The blazon of the municipal coat of arms is Or a Deer rampant Gules on a Mount of 3 Coupeaux Vert.

== Demographics ==
Thierachern has a population (as of December 2020) of 2,514. As of 2012, 3.8% of the population are resident foreign nationals. Between the last 2 years (2010-2012) the population changed at a rate of 3.4%. Migration accounted for 1.6%, while births and deaths accounted for 1.0%.

Most of the population (as of 2000) speaks German (1,838 or 97.4%) as their first language, French is the second most common (17 or 0.9%) and English is the third (7 or 0.4%). There are 6 people who speak Italian.

As of 2008, the population was 48.7% male and 51.3% female. The population was made up of 1,074 Swiss men (47.3% of the population) and 34 (1.5%) non-Swiss men. There were 1,136 Swiss women (50.0%) and 29 (1.3%) non-Swiss women. Of the population in the municipality, 470 or about 24.9% were born in Thierachern and lived there in 2000. There were 1,060 or 56.1% who were born in the same canton, while 235 or 12.4% were born somewhere else in Switzerland, and 93 or 4.9% were born outside of Switzerland.

As of 2012, children and teenagers (0–19 years old) make up 24.6% of the population, while adults (20–64 years old) make up 58.5% and seniors (over 64 years old) make up 16.9%.

As of 2000, there were 761 people who were single and never married in the municipality. There were 953 married individuals, 94 widows or widowers and 80 individuals who are divorced.

As of 2010, there were 223 households that consist of only one person and 78 households with five or more people. In 2000, a total of 758 apartments (93.3% of the total) were permanently occupied, while 31 apartments (3.8%) were seasonally occupied and 23 apartments (2.8%) were empty. As of 2012, the construction rate of new housing units was 9.4 new units per 1000 residents. The vacancy rate for the municipality, in 2013, was 0.6%. In 2012, single family homes made up 60.1% of the total housing in the municipality.

The historical population is given in the following chart:

== Economy ==
As of 2011, Thierachern had an unemployment rate of 1.42%. As of 2011, there were a total of 425 people employed in the municipality. Of these, there were 97 people employed in the primary economic sector and about 33 businesses involved in this sector. The secondary sector employs 79 people and there were 20 businesses in this sector. The tertiary sector employs 248 people, with 84 businesses in this sector. There were 1,020 residents of the municipality who were employed in some capacity, of which females made up 41.0% of the workforce.

In 2008 there were a total of 285 full-time equivalent jobs. The number of jobs in the primary sector was 64, all of which were in agriculture. The number of jobs in the secondary sector was 72 of which 16 or (22.2%) were in manufacturing and 56 (77.8%) were in construction. The number of jobs in the tertiary sector was 149. In the tertiary sector; 52 or 34.9% were in wholesale or retail sales or the repair of motor vehicles, 6 or 4.0% were in the movement and storage of goods, 10 or 6.7% were in a hotel or restaurant, 2 or 1.3% were the insurance or financial industry, 24 or 16.1% were technical professionals or scientists, 32 or 21.5% were in education and 12 or 8.1% were in health care.

In 2000, there were 158 workers who commuted into the municipality and 815 workers who commuted away. The municipality is a net exporter of workers, with about 5.2 workers leaving the municipality for every one entering. A total of 205 workers (56.5% of the 363 total workers in the municipality) both lived and worked in Thierachern. Of the working population, 15.7% used public transportation to get to work, and 53.2% used a private car.

The local and cantonal tax rate in Thierachern is one of the lowest in the canton. In 2012 the average local and cantonal tax rate on a married resident, with two children, of Thierachern making 150,000 CHF was 11.9%, while an unmarried resident's rate was 17.8%. For comparison, the average rate for the entire canton in 2011, was 14.2% and 22.0%, while the nationwide average was 12.3% and 21.1% respectively.

In 2010 there were a total of 1,009 tax payers in the municipality. Of that total, 330 made over 75,000 CHF per year. There were 9 people who made between 15,000 and 20,000 per year. The average income of the over 75,000 CHF group in Thierachern was 107,395 CHF, while the average across all of Switzerland was 131,244 CHF.

In 2011 a total of 1.7% of the population received direct financial assistance from the government.

== Politics ==
In the 2011 federal election the most popular party was the Swiss People's Party (SVP) which received 34.2% of the vote. The next three most popular parties were the Social Democratic Party (SP) (16.0%), the Conservative Democratic Party (BDP) (14.1%) and the Evangelical People's Party (EVP) (9.2%). In the federal election, a total of 917 votes were cast, and the voter turnout was 52.7%.

== Religion ==
From the 2000 census, 1,462 or 77.4% belonged to the Swiss Reformed Church, while 182 or 9.6% were Roman Catholic. Of the rest of the population, there were 9 members of an Orthodox church (or about 0.48% of the population), and there were 101 individuals (or about 5.35% of the population) who belonged to another Christian church. There was 1 individual who was Jewish, and 6 (or about 0.32% of the population) who were Muslim. There were 2 individuals who were Buddhist and 4 individuals who belonged to another church. 85 (or about 4.50% of the population) belonged to no church, are agnostic or atheist, and 36 individuals (or about 1.91% of the population) did not answer the question.

== Education ==
In Thierachern about 65.2% of the population have completed non-mandatory upper secondary education, and 16.9% have completed additional higher education (either university or a Fachhochschule). Of the 215 who had completed some form of tertiary schooling listed in the census, 75.8% were Swiss men, 20.0% were Swiss women, 2.8% were non-Swiss men.

The Canton of Bern school system provides one year of non-obligatory Kindergarten, followed by six years of Primary school. This is followed by three years of obligatory lower Secondary school where the students are separated according to ability and aptitude. Following the lower Secondary students may attend additional schooling or they may enter an apprenticeship.

During the 2012-13 school year, there were a total of 362 students attending classes in Thierachern. There were a total of 50 students in the German language kindergarten classes in the municipality. Of the kindergarten students, 4.0% were permanent or temporary residents of Switzerland (not citizens) and 4.0% have a different mother language than the classroom language. The municipality's primary school had 168 students in German language classes. Of the primary students, 2.4% were permanent or temporary residents of Switzerland (not citizens) and 4.2% have a different mother language than the classroom language. During the same year, the lower secondary school had a total of 144 students. There were 0.7% who were permanent or temporary residents of Switzerland (not citizens) and 2.1% have a different mother language than the classroom language.

As of 2000, there were a total of 306 students attending any school in the municipality. Of those, 225 both lived and attended school in the municipality, while 81 students came from another municipality. During the same year, 50 residents attended schools outside the municipality.

Thierachern is home to the Schul- und Volksbibliothek Thierachern library. The library has (as of 2008) 5,072 books or other media, and loaned out 13,669 items in the same year. It was open a total of 125 days with average of 6 hours per week during that year.
