= Erlenbach im Simmental =

- Municipality
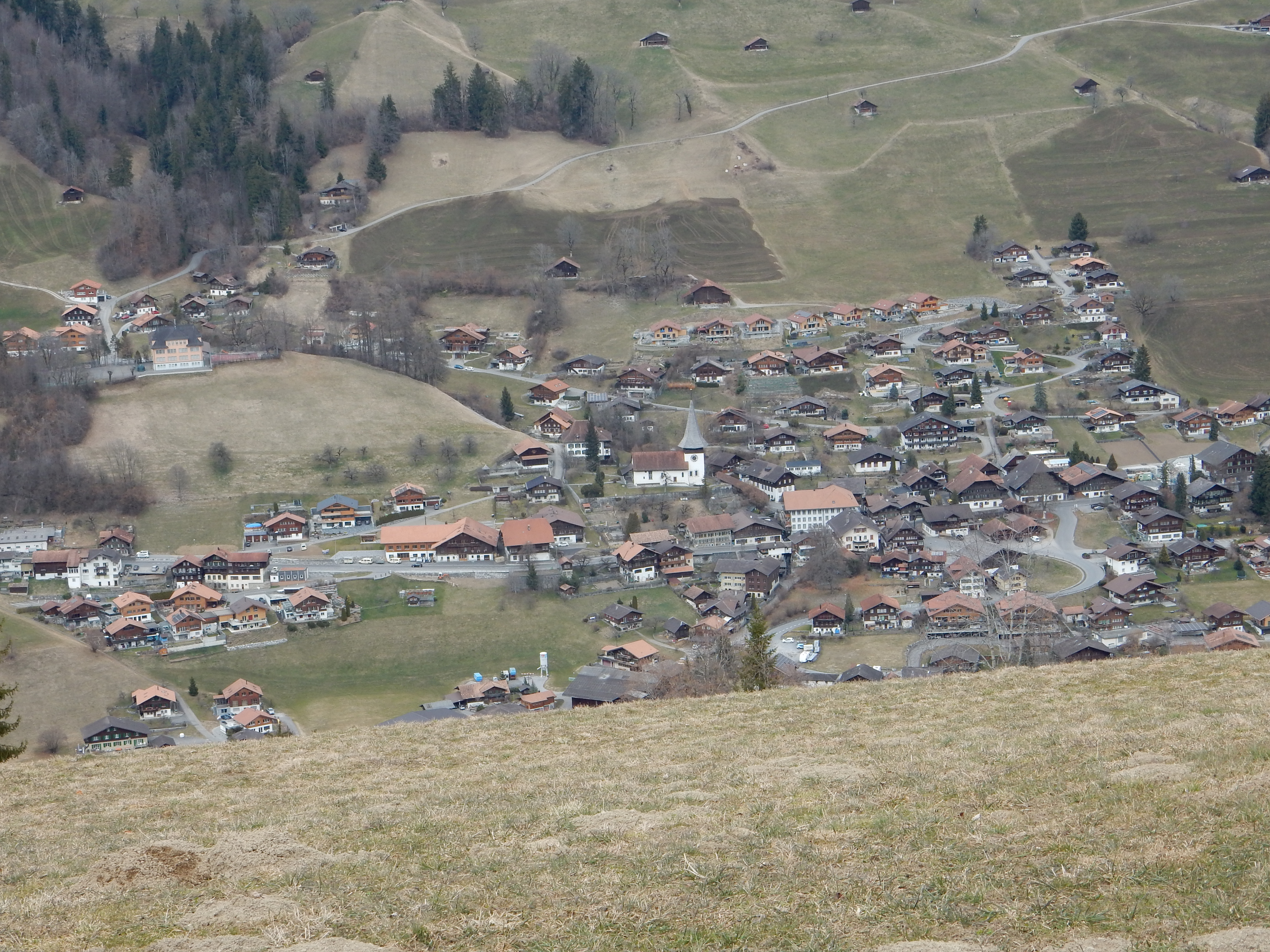
- Erlenbach im Simmental village

- Flag Coat of arms
- Location of Erlenbach im Simmental
- Location within Switzerland Location within Canton of Bern
- Coordinates: 46°39′N 7°33′E
- Country: Switzerland
- Canton: Bern
- District: Niedersimmental

Government
  - Executive: Gemeinderat with 7 members
  - Mayor: Gemeindepräsident(in); Thomas Klossner (as of 2026)

Area
  - Total: 36.73 km^{2} (14.18 sq mi)
- Elevation: 700 m (2,300 ft)

Population (December 2020)
  - Total: 1,724
  - Density: 46.94/km^{2} (121.6/sq mi)
- Time zone: UTC+01:00 (CET)
  - Summer (DST): UTC+02:00 (CEST)
- Postal code: 3762
- SFOS number: 763
- ISO 3166 code: CH-BE
- Localities: Allmenden, Kleindorf, Latterbach, Ringoldingen, Stalden
- Surrounded by: Oberstocken, Niederstocken, Reutigen, Wimmis, Diemtigen, Därstetten
- Twin towns: Erlenbach, Zurich (Switzerland), Erlenbach am Main (Germany)
- Website: www.erlenbach-be.ch

Erlenbach im Simmental is a municipality in the district of Niedersimmental in the canton of Bern in Switzerland.

== History ==
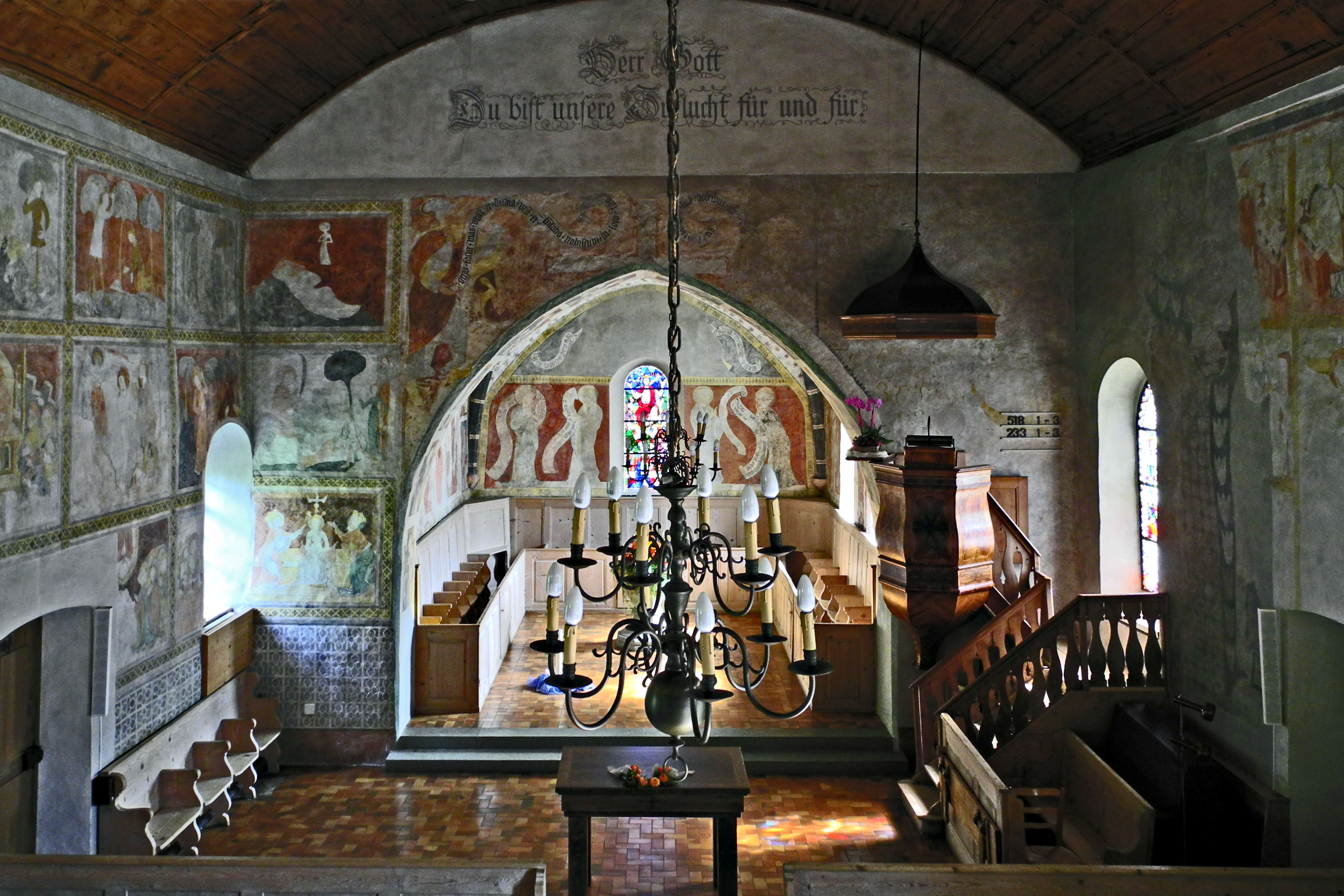
13th-15th century murals in the Erlenbach church

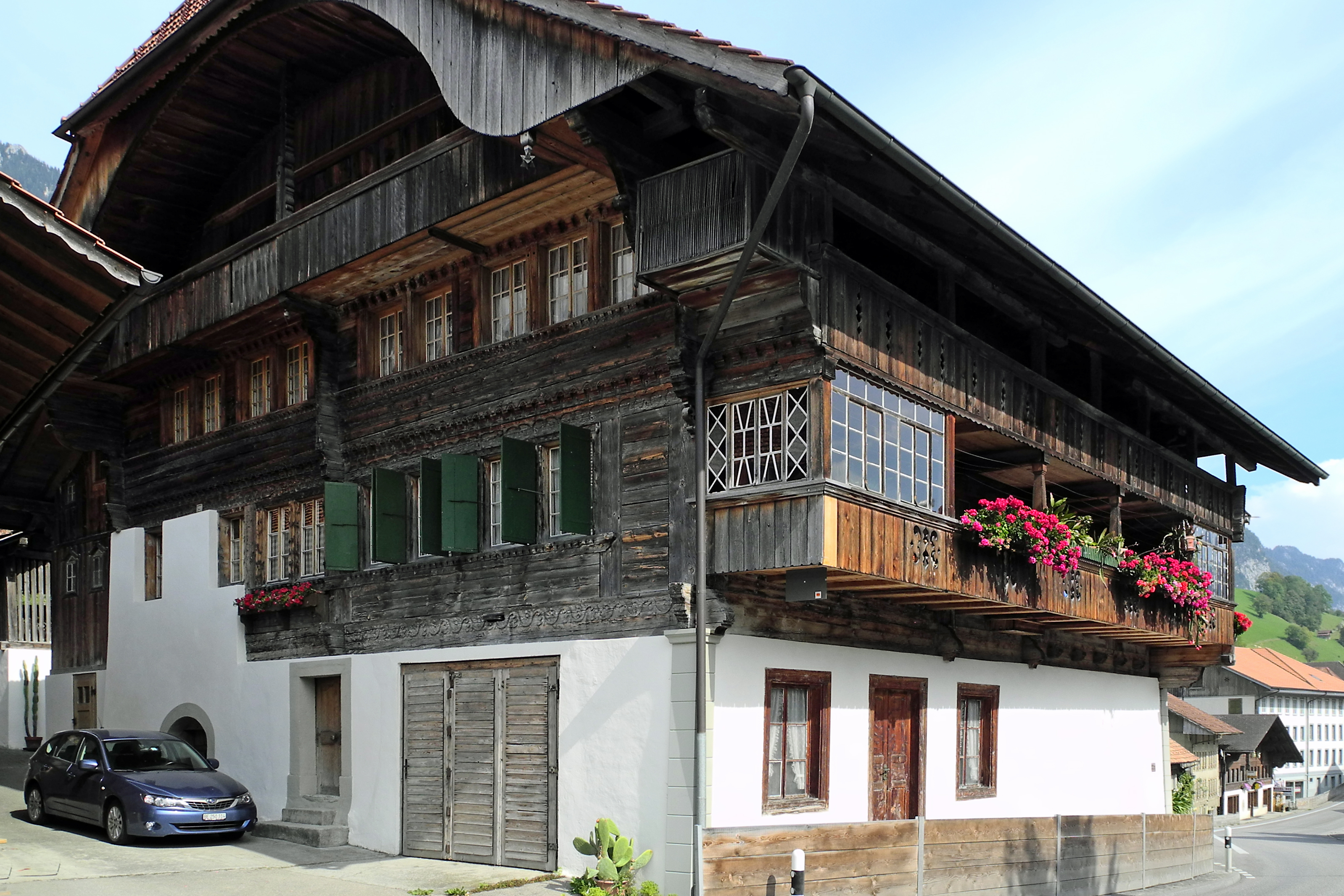
Platz House in Erlenbach, built with money from trading cattle across the Alps.

Aerial view (1967)

Erlenbach im Simmental is first mentioned in 1180-81 as Arlunbach.

The oldest trace of humans in the area is the Paleolithic Chilchlihöhle cave. Neolithic remains have been discovered at Branteschopf Schwynbalm. Other prehistoric traces include the Bronze Age and Roman era artifacts at Balzenberg and Unterklusi and a horde of Roman coins at Stockhorn. After the Fall of the Western Roman Empire, the region remained inhabited. The earthen fortification at Chastel probably dates to the Middle Ages. By the High Middle Ages there were at least three castles or forts in the modern municipality, though only ruins remain.

The Freiherr von Erlenbach first appears in records in 1133. When the Erlenbach family died out, their lands probably passed through another noble family before ending up with the Freiherr von Brandis in 1368. Beginning in the 14th century, the Landsgemeinde, the direct democratic assembly, of the surrounding communities met in Erlenbach. In 1393, 1429 and 1445 the villagers bought their obligation to pay taxes and serve in corvée labor away from the Freiherr von Brandis. When the city of Bern acquired the villages from the Freiherr in 1439, they reconfirmed the villages' rights. Beginning in the 16th century they began to raise cattle, keeping them in the valleys for winter before moving them to spring pastures in the mountains. Over the following years, Erlenbach became a major cattle and cheese exporter. A number of local residents became wealthy from exports and built large chalets in the village. In 1765, much of the village was destroyed in a fire, though it was quickly rebuilt. Following the 1798 French invasion, Erlenbach im Simmental became part of the Helvetic Republic district of Niedersimmental in the Canton of Oberland. In 1803, with the Act of Mediation, it rejoined the Canton of Bern.

In the 19th century, the Simmentalstrasse connected the municipality with the rest of the country. Traffic increased when the Spiez-Zweisimmen railroad opened a station at Ringoldingen in 1902. With the road and railroad, the population grew and businesses and tourism grew in Erlenbach. In the 1970s, a number of new housing developments grew up above the village. One of the largest developed in Latterbach near the highway on ramp at Wimmis. Erlenbach is home to the district hospital, a secondary school and a district nursing home. In 1987 the Agenstein House, built in 1766, became the Niedersimmental Region Museum.

The village church of St. Michael was first mentioned in 1228. It was probably built in the 11th century on the site of an early medieval church. The interior was decorated with murals during the 13th and 14th centuries. However, many of the murals were redone in the 15th century. In 1330, the patronage rights over the church were donated to Interlaken Monastery. When Bern accepted the Protestant Reformation in 1528, the monastery was secularized and the church came under Bernese authority. In the years before Bern accepted the Reformation, the priest at Erlenbach, Peter Kunz, was preaching the Reformation in the village. Later, he became the pastor of the Cathedral in Bern.

== Geography ==
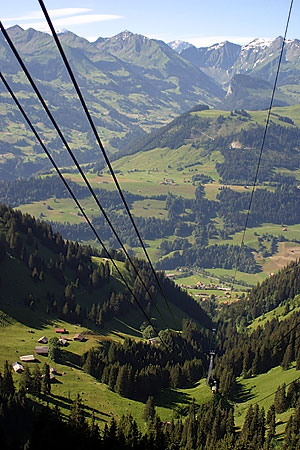
Simmental

Erlenbach im Simmental has an area of 36.69 km^{2} (14.17 sq mi). As of 2012, a total of 18.56 km^{2} (7.17 mi^{2}) or 50.5% is used for agricultural purposes, while 13.93 km^{2} (5.38 mi^{2}) or 37.9% is forested. The rest of the municipality is 1.27 km^{2} (0.49 mi^{2}) or 3.5% is settled (buildings or roads), 0.32 km^{2} (0.12 mi^{2}) or 0.9% is either rivers or lakes and 2.6 km^{2} (1.0 mi^{2}) or 7.1% is unproductive land.

During the same year, housing and buildings made up 1.5% and transportation infrastructure made up 1.4%. A total of 32.3% of the total land area is heavily forested and 5.3% is covered with orchards or small clusters of trees. Of the agricultural land, 16.2% is pasturage and 33.3% is used for alpine pastures. Of the water in the municipality, 0.6% is in lakes and 0.3% is in rivers and streams. Of the unproductive areas, 3.3% is unproductive vegetation and 3.7% is too rocky for vegetation.

The municipality includes the farming settlements (Bäuerten) of Erlenbach, Latterbach and Ringoldingen in the valley. On a terrace above the valley are the Bäuerten of Balzenberg, Eschlen, Thal and Allmenden. Above them are alpine meadows, woods and mountains.

On 31 December 2009 Amtsbezirk Niedersimmental, the municipality's former district, was dissolved. On the following day, 1 January 2010, it joined the newly created Verwaltungskreis Frutigen-Niedersimmental.

== Coat of arms ==
The blazon of the municipal coat of arms is Argent, a castle embattled gules.

== Demographics ==
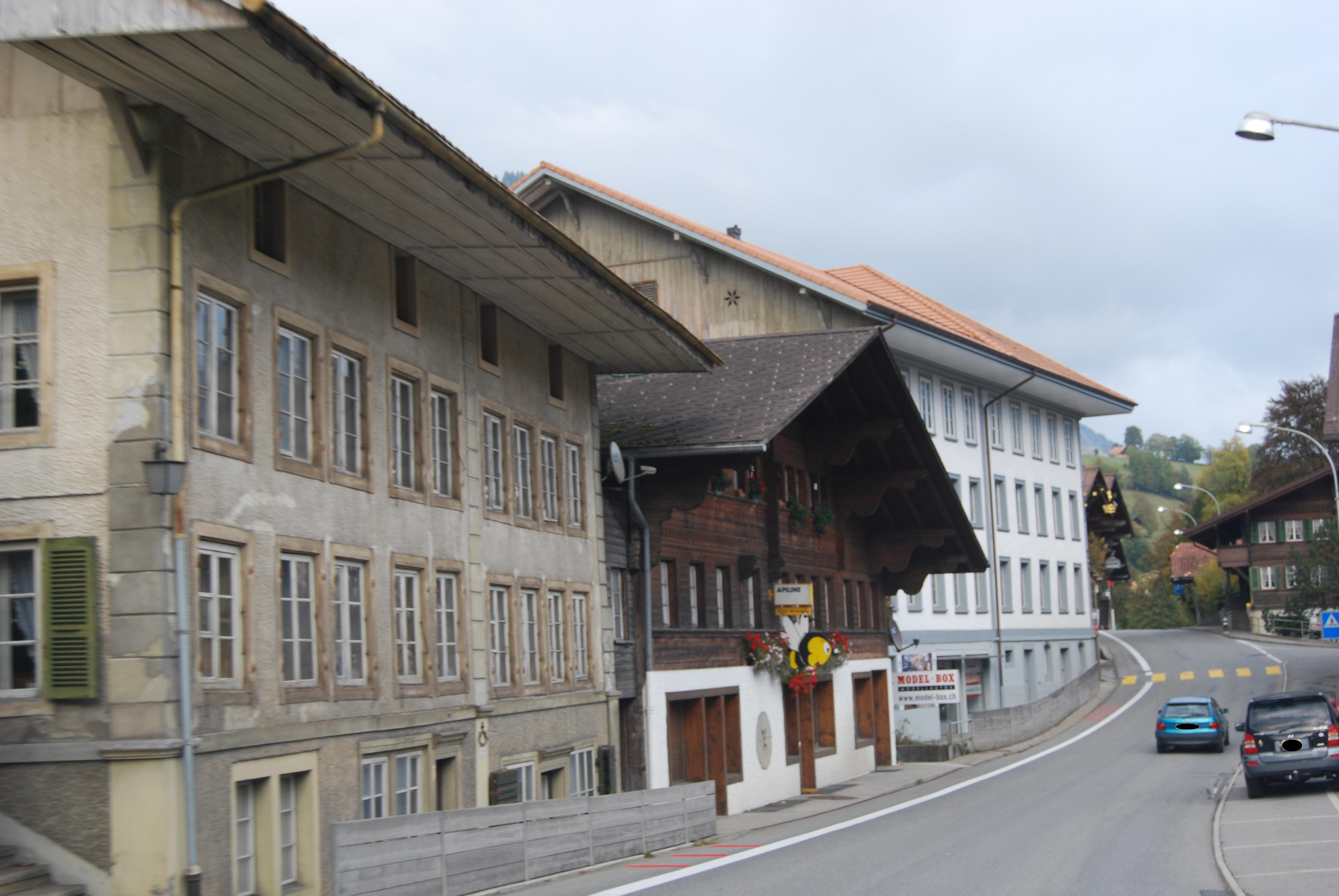
Erlenbach village

Erlenbach im Simmental has a population (as of December 2020) of 1,724. As of 2010, 5.1% of the population are resident foreign nationals. Over the last 10 years (2001-2011) the population has changed at a rate of -0.9%. Migration accounted for -1.2%, while births and deaths accounted for 0.2%.

Most of the population (as of 2000) speaks German (1,755 or 97.4%) as their first language, French is the second most common (14 or 0.8%) and Serbo-Croatian is the third (9 or 0.5%). There are 2 people who speak Italian and 1 person who speaks Romansh.

As of 2008, the population was 49.1% male and 50.9% female. The population was made up of 786 Swiss men (46.1% of the population) and 50 (2.9%) non-Swiss men. There were 831 Swiss women (48.8%) and 37 (2.2%) non-Swiss women. Of the population in the municipality, 707 or about 39.2% were born in Erlenbach im Simmental and lived there in 2000. There were 737 or 40.9% who were born in the same canton, while 177 or 9.8% were born somewhere else in Switzerland, and 94 or 5.2% were born outside of Switzerland.

As of 2011, children and teenagers (0–19 years old) make up 20% of the population, while adults (20–64 years old) make up 60.1% and seniors (over 64 years old) make up 19.9%.

As of 2000, there were 747 people who were single and never married in the municipality. There were 832 married individuals, 151 widows or widowers and 72 individuals who are divorced.

As of 2010, there were 232 households that consist of only one person and 45 households with five or more people. In 2000, a total of 685 apartments (83.7% of the total) were permanently occupied, while 98 apartments (12.0%) were seasonally occupied and 35 apartments (4.3%) were empty. The vacancy rate for the municipality, in 2012, was 1.09%. In 2011, single family homes made up 46.9% of the total housing in the municipality.

The historical population is given in the following chart:

== Heritage sites of national significance ==
The village rectory and the Swiss Reformed Church, the Agenstein house, the Platz house and the Ründi house are listed as Swiss heritage site of national significance. The entire village of Erlenbach im Simmental and the hamlet of Balzenberg are part of the Inventory of Swiss Heritage Sites.

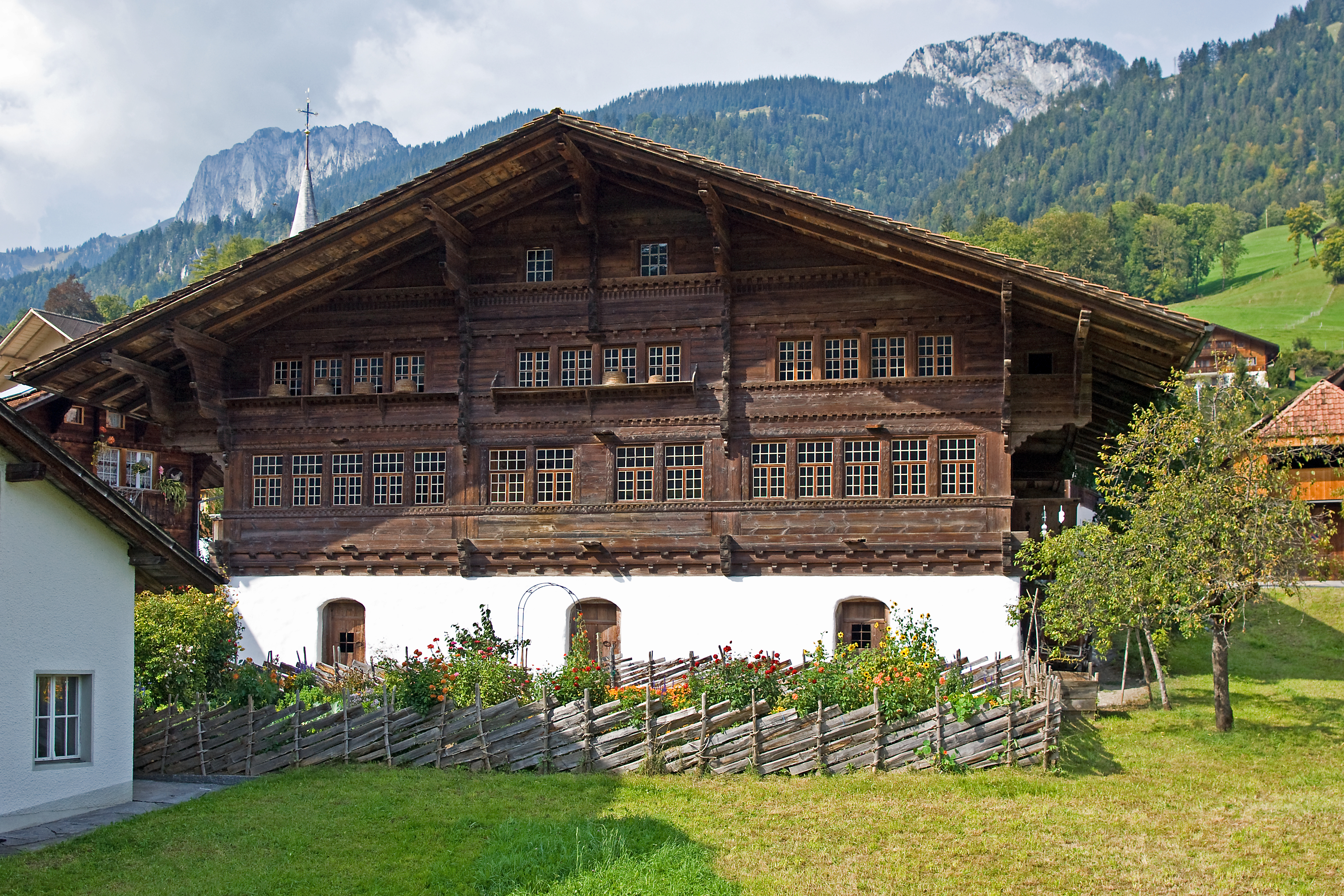
Agenstein House

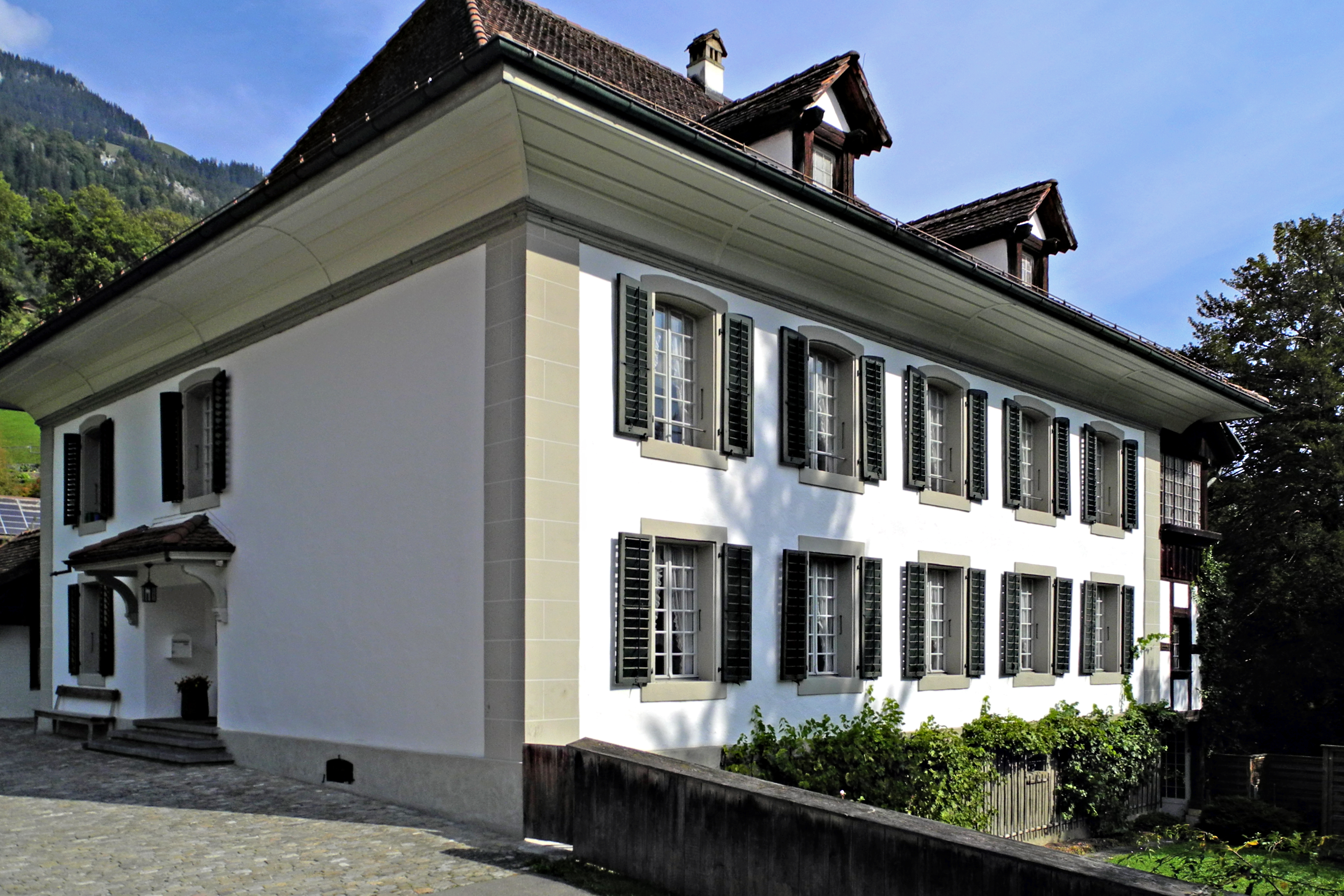
Rectory

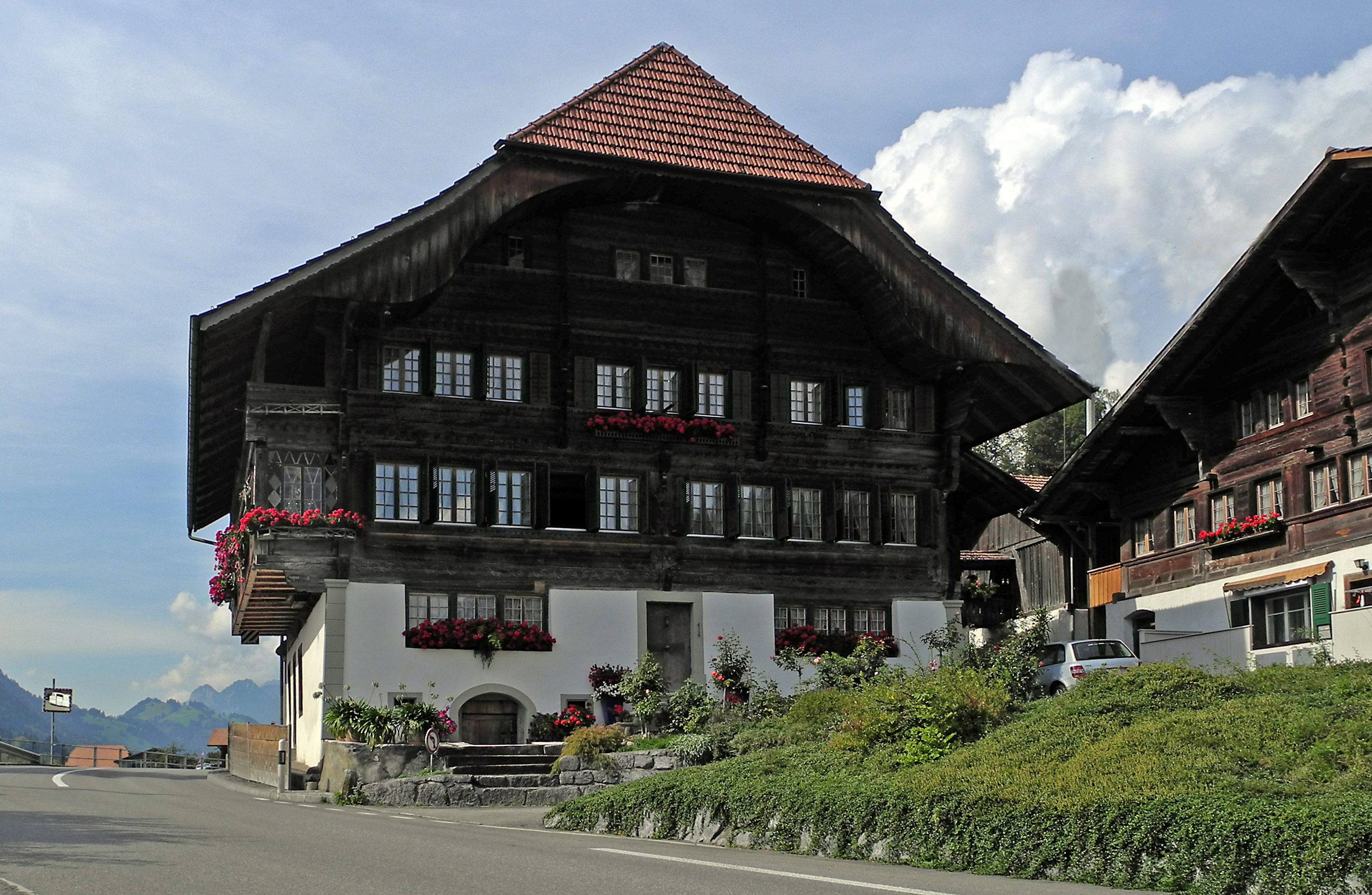
Platz House

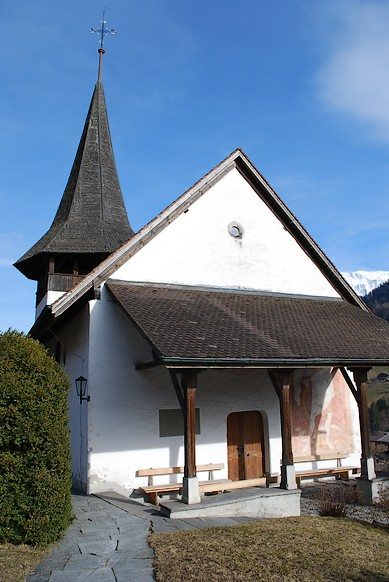
Swiss Reformed Church

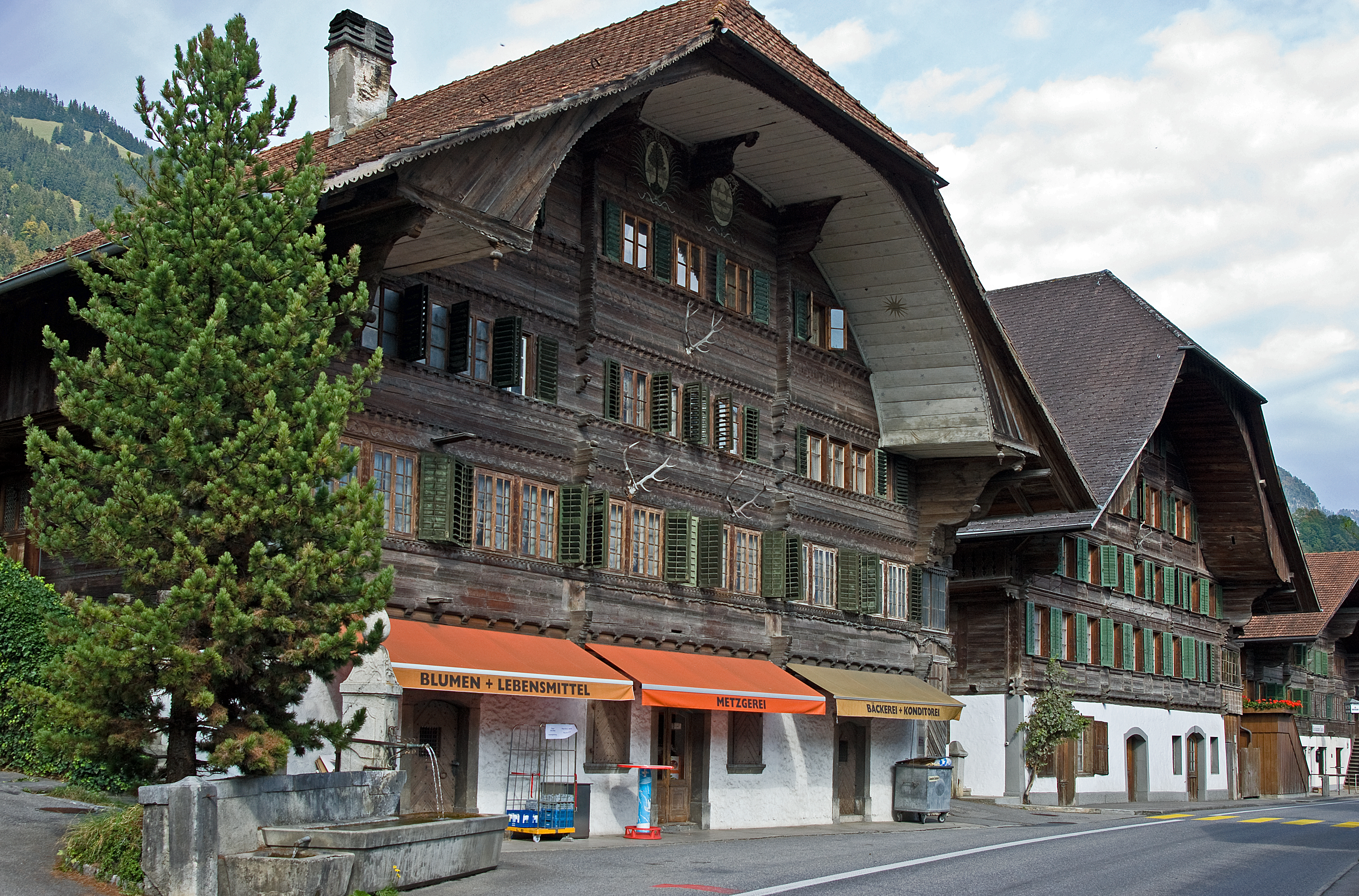
Ründi House

== Personalities ==
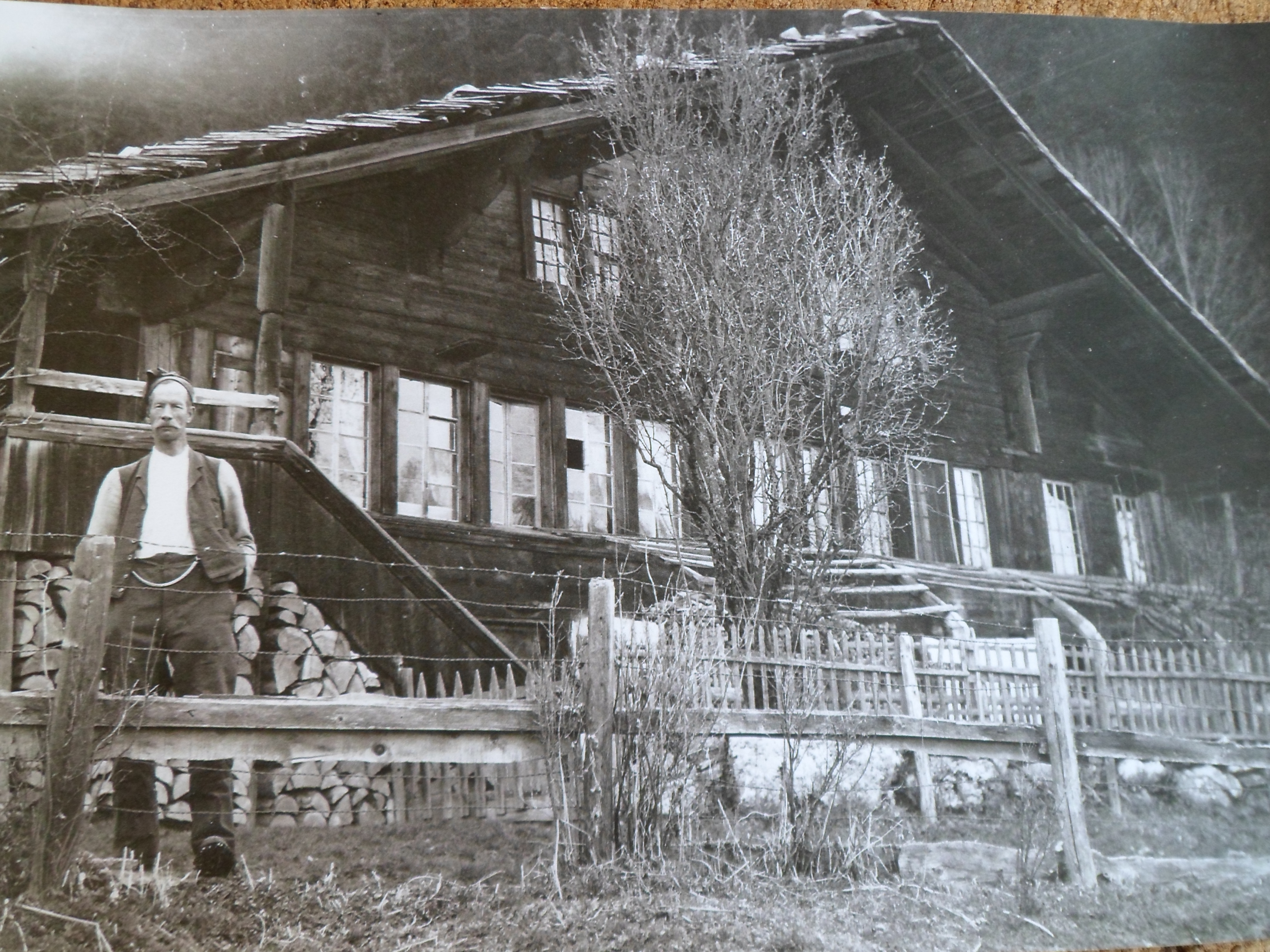
Jakob Amman's house around 1900

Erlenbach was the birthplace of Jacob Ammann, the leader of the Amish movement.

== Politics ==
In the 2011 federal election the most popular party was the Swiss People's Party (SVP) which received 43.3% of the vote. The next three most popular parties were the Conservative Democratic Party (BDP) (23.3%), the Social Democratic Party (SP) (8.7%) and the Federal Democratic Union of Switzerland (EDU) (5.9%). In the federal election, a total of 666 votes were cast, and the voter turnout was 50.3%.

== Economy ==
As of 2011, Erlenbach im Simmental had an unemployment rate of 1.05%. As of 2008, there were a total of 732 people employed in the municipality. Of these, there were 154 people employed in the primary economic sector and about 52 businesses involved in this sector. 127 people were employed in the secondary sector and there were 25 businesses in this sector. 451 people were employed in the tertiary sector, with 59 businesses in this sector. There were 857 residents of the municipality who were employed in some capacity, of which females made up 42.4% of the workforce.

In 2008 there were a total of 533 full-time equivalent jobs. The number of jobs in the primary sector was 94, all of which were in agriculture. The number of jobs in the secondary sector was 113 of which 66 or (58.4%) were in manufacturing and 43 (38.1%) were in construction. The number of jobs in the tertiary sector was 326. In the tertiary sector; 65 or 19.9% were in wholesale or retail sales or the repair of motor vehicles, 31 or 9.5% were in the movement and storage of goods, 27 or 8.3% were in a hotel or restaurant, 9 or 2.8% were the insurance or financial industry, 7 or 2.1% were technical professionals or scientists, 21 or 6.4% were in education and 145 or 44.5% were in health care.

In 2000, there were 268 workers who commuted into the municipality and 430 workers who commuted away. The municipality is a net exporter of workers, with about 1.6 workers leaving the municipality for every one entering. A total of 427 workers (61.4% of the 695 total workers in the municipality) both lived and worked in Erlenbach im Simmental. Of the working population, 8.3% used public transportation to get to work, and 60.7% used a private car.

In 2011 the average local and cantonal tax rate on a married resident, with two children, of Erlenbach im Simmental making 150,000 CHF was 12.9%, while an unmarried resident's rate was 18.9%. For comparison, the average rate for the entire canton in the same year, was 14.2% and 22.0%, while the nationwide average was 12.3% and 21.1% respectively. In 2009 there were a total of 722 tax payers in the municipality. Of that total, 176 made over 75,000 CHF per year. There were 15 people who made between 15,000 and 20,000 per year. The greatest number of workers, 206, made between 50,000 and 75,000 CHF per year. The average income of the over 75,000 CHF group in Erlenbach im Simmental was 103,894 CHF, while the average across all of Switzerland was 130,478 CHF.

In 2011 a total of 3.9% of the population received direct financial assistance from the government.

== Religion ==
From the 2000 census, 1,486 or 82.5% belonged to the Swiss Reformed Church, while 110 or 6.1% were Roman Catholic. Of the rest of the population, there was 1 member of an Orthodox church, there were 2 individuals (or about 0.11% of the population) who belonged to the Christian Catholic Church, and there were 65 individuals (or about 3.61% of the population) who belonged to another Christian church. There were 6 (or about 0.33% of the population) who were Muslim. There was 1 person who was Buddhist, 5 individuals who were Hindu and 1 individual who belonged to another church. 58 (or about 3.22% of the population) belonged to no church, are agnostic or atheist, and 67 individuals (or about 3.72% of the population) did not answer the question.

== Transport ==
Erlenbach im Simmental sits on the Spiez–Zweisimmen line and is served by trains at the Erlenbach im Simmental and Ringoldingen railway stations. The GoldenPass Express (GPX) also stops at Erlenbach and continues to Zweisimmen, Gstaad and onto Montreux or towards Spiez and Interlaken OST.

== Climate ==
Between 1981 and 2010 Erlenbach had an average of 140.9 days of rain or snow per year and on average received 1,308 mm (51.5 in) of precipitation. The wettest month was July during which time Erlenbach im Simmental received an average of 149 mm (5.9 in) of rain or snow. During this month there was precipitation for an average of 12.8 days. The month with the most days of precipitation was May, with an average of 14.6, but with only 130 mm (5.1 in) of rain or snow. The driest month of the year was February with an average of 86 mm (3.4 in) of precipitation over 9.8 days.

== Education ==
In Erlenbach about 57.3% of the population have completed non-mandatory upper secondary education, and 13.4% have completed additional higher education (either university or a Fachhochschule). Of the 139 who had completed some form of tertiary schooling listed in the census, 76.3% were Swiss men, 18.7% were Swiss women, 4.3% were non-Swiss men.

The Canton of Bern school system provides one year of non-obligatory Kindergarten, followed by six years of Primary school. This is followed by three years of obligatory lower Secondary school where the students are separated according to ability and aptitude. Following the lower Secondary students may attend additional schooling or they may enter an apprenticeship.

During the 2011–12 school year, there were a total of 220 students attending classes in Erlenbach im Simmental. There were 2 kindergarten classes with a total of 21 students in the municipality. The municipality had 4 primary classes and 80 students. Of the primary students, 2.5% were permanent or temporary residents of Switzerland (not citizens) and 1.3% have a different mother language than the classroom language. During the same year, there were 6 lower secondary classes with a total of 119 students. There were 1.7% who were permanent or temporary residents of Switzerland (not citizens) and 1.7% have a different mother language than the classroom language.

As of 2000, there were a total of 307 students attending any school in the municipality. Of those, 245 both lived and attended school in the municipality, while 62 students came from another municipality. During the same year, 58 residents attended schools outside the municipality.

== See also ==
- Erlenbach horse
