= Forst-Längenbühl =

- Municipality
- Flag Coat of arms
- Location of Forst-Längenbühl
- Location within Switzerland Location within Canton of Bern
- Coordinates: 46°45′N 7°31′E
- Country: Switzerland
- Canton: Bern
- District: Thun

Government
  - Mayor: Kurt Kindler

Area
  - Total: 4.50 km^{2} (1.74 sq mi)
- Elevation: 652 m (2,139 ft)

Population (Dec 2012)
  - Total: 751
  - Density: 167/km^{2} (432/sq mi)
- Time zone: UTC+01:00 (CET)
  - Summer (DST): UTC+02:00 (CEST)
- Postal code: 3636
- SFOS number: 948
- ISO 3166 code: CH-BE
- Localities: Längenbühl, Forst
- Surrounded by: Blumenstein, Gurzelen, Thierachern, Uebeschi, Uetendorf, Wattenwil
- Website: www.3636.ch

Forst-Längenbühl is a municipality in the administrative district of Thun in the canton of Bern in Switzerland. It was formed on January 1, 2007, through the uniting of Längenbühl and Forst.

== History ==
=== Forst ===
The oldest trace of a settlement in the area is the ruins of a Roman villa with a bath located in Seieried. The village of Forst is first mentioned in 1344 as part of the Herrschaft of Gurzelen. It later became part of the lands of the college of canons of Amsoldingen. When the college of canons became impoverished, it was dissolved and their lands were acquired by the canons of St. Vincent's cathedral in Bern. It was then sold and passed through a number of owners. In 1541 the land and Zwing und Bann rights over Forst were half owned by the farmers of the village. By the 18th century about two-thirds of the sparsely settled community were in the court of Gurzelen which was part of the Herrschaft of Burgistein. The other third was in the court of Amsoldingen which was part of the Thun District. Following the 1798 French invasion, Forst became part of the Helvetic Republic district of Oberseftigen. After the collapse of the Republic and the 1803 Act of Mediation both parts of the community were combined and joined the newly created Thun District. In the 20th century it formed a school district with Längenbühl and developed close relationships with the nearby municipality. In 2007 the two municipalities merged into a single entity.

Until 1922 it was part of the parish of Amsoldingen. In 1922 the residents forced Amsoldingen to allow them to join the parish of Wattenwil.

=== Längenbühl ===
Längenbühl is first mentioned in 1493 as Lengenbuel.

The oldest trace of settlements in the area are several neolithic canoes which were discovered in both lakes in the municipality. Other Bronze Age and La Tène artifacts indicate that the area remained inhabited in antiquity. During the Middle Ages the village belonged to the Freiherr von Uetendorf. In 1380 the citizen of Thun, Johann von Zeinigen, inherited the Uetendorf lands, including Längenbühl. It later passed to the Hospital in Thun and the village was administered by a Vogt who was appointed by the hospital. Following the 1798 French invasion, Längenbühl became part of the Helvetic Republic district of Oberseftigen. After the collapse of the Republic and the 1803 Act of Mediation it joined the newly created Thun District.

It formed a school district with Forst, based around the school house in Längenbühl.

== Geography ==
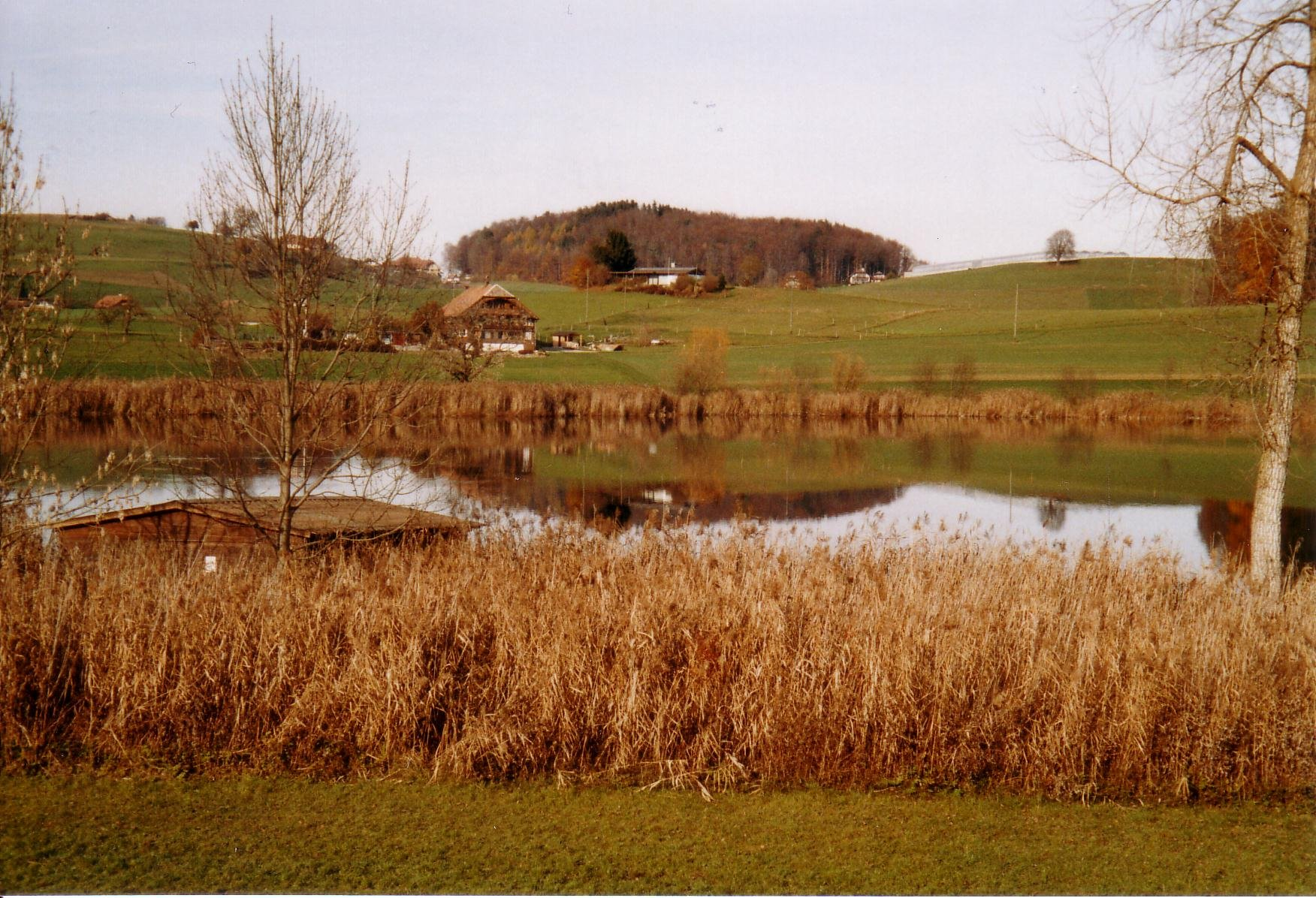
Dittligsee in Längenbühl

Forst-Längenbühl has an area of 4.5 km^{2} (1.74 sq mi). As of 2012, a total of 3.06 km^{2} (1.18 mi^{2}) or 68.2% is used for agricultural purposes, while 0.94 km^{2} (0.36 mi^{2}) or 20.9% is forested. The rest of the municipality is 0.38 km^{2} (0.15 mi^{2}) or 8.5% is settled (buildings or roads), 0.1 km^{2} (25 acres) or 2.2% is either rivers or lakes and 0.04 km^{2} (9.9 acres) or 0.9% is unproductive land.

During the same year, housing and buildings made up 6.0% and transportation infrastructure made up 1.8%. A total of 19.6% of the total land area is heavily forested and 1.3% is covered with orchards or small clusters of trees. Of the agricultural land, 31.4% is used for growing crops and 33.0% is pasturage, while 3.8% is used for orchards or vine crops. Of the water in the municipality, 1.8% is in lakes and 0.4% is in rivers and streams.

There are three smaller lakes in Längenbühl: Dittligsee, Geistsee and a smaller pond.

Forst is a settlement with scattered building in the moraine landscape of the Upper Gürbetal. The most important boroughs are Dörfli, Allmid (Allmend), Chromen, Längmoos, and Riedhubel.

On 1 January 2007 the former municipalities of Forst and Längenbühl merged into the municipality of Forst-Längenbühl.

On 31 December 2009 Amtsbezirk Thun, the municipality's former district, was dissolved. On the following day, 1 January 2010, it joined the newly created Verwaltungskreis Thun.

== Demographics ==
Forst-Längenbühl has a population (as of December 2020) of 769. As of 2012, 4.3% of the population are resident foreign nationals. Between the last 2 years (2010–2012) the population changed at a rate of 2.9%. Migration accounted for 2.1%, while births and deaths accounted for 1.1%.

Most of the population (as of 2000) speaks German (98%) as their first language, French is the second most common (0.9%) and Italian is the third (0.2%).

As of 2008, the population was 48.6% male and 51.4% female. The population was made up of 343 Swiss men (47.0% of the population) and 12 (1.6%) non-Swiss men. There were 363 Swiss women (49.7%) and 12 (1.6%) non-Swiss women.

As of 2012, children and teenagers (0–19 years old) make up 22.5% of the population, while adults (20–64 years old) make up 61.1% and seniors (over 64 years old) make up 16.4%.

As of 2010, there were 83 households that consist of only one person and 28 households with five or more people. As of 2012, the construction rate of new housing units was 1.3 new units per 1000 residents. The vacancy rate for the municipality, in 2013, was 0.6%. In 2012, single family homes made up 39.2% of the total housing in the municipality.

== Historic population ==
The historical population is given in the following chart:

== Economy ==
As of 2011, Forst-Längenbühl had an unemployment rate of 0.89%. As of 2011, there were a total of 184 people employed in the municipality. Of these, there were 77 people employed in the primary economic sector and about 28 businesses involved in this sector. 40 people were employed in the secondary sector and there were 14 businesses in this sector. 67 people were employed in the tertiary sector, with 22 businesses in this sector.

In 2008 there were a total of 115 full-time equivalent jobs. The number of jobs in the primary sector was 49, all of which were in agriculture. The number of jobs in the secondary sector was 22 of which 5 or (22.7%) were in manufacturing and 17 (77.3%) were in construction. The number of jobs in the tertiary sector was 44. In the tertiary sector; 9 or 20.5% were in wholesale or retail sales or the repair of motor vehicles, 13 or 29.5% were in a hotel or restaurant, 1 was a technical professional or scientist, 6 or 13.6% were in education. Of the working population, 6.6% used public transportation to get to work, and 54.4% used a private car.

The local and cantonal tax rate in Forst-Längenbühl is one of the lowest in the canton. In 2012 the average local and cantonal tax rate on a married resident, with two children, of Forst-Längenbühl making 150,000 CHF was 12%, while an unmarried resident's rate was 18%. For comparison, the average rate for the entire canton in 2011, was 14.2% and 22.0%, while the nationwide average was 12.3% and 21.1% respectively.

In 2010 there were a total of 316 tax payers in the municipality. Of that total, 88 made over 75,000 CHF per year. There were 4 people who made between 15,000 and 20,000 per year. The greatest number of workers, 92, made between 50,000 and 75,000 CHF per year. The average income of the over 75,000 CHF group in Forst-Längenbühl was 101,128 CHF, while the average across all of Switzerland was 131,244 CHF.

In 2011 a total of 3.3% of the population received direct financial assistance from the government.

== Politics ==
In the 2011 federal election the most popular party was the Swiss People's Party (SVP) which received 46.0% of the vote. The next three most popular parties were the Conservative Democratic Party (BDP) (13.1%), the Federal Democratic Union of Switzerland (EDU) (7.4%) and the Social Democratic Party (SP) (7.2%). In the federal election, a total of 345 votes were cast, and the voter turnout was 59.9%.

== Religion ==
In 2000 about 84.4% of the population belonged to a Protestant church, 3.1% were Roman Catholic and 5% had no religious affiliation.

== Education ==
In Forst-Längenbühl about 62.2% of the population have completed non-mandatory upper secondary education, and 15.6% have completed additional higher education (either university or a Fachhochschule).

The Canton of Bern school system provides one year of non-obligatory Kindergarten, followed by six years of Primary school. This is followed by three years of obligatory lower Secondary school where the students are separated according to ability and aptitude. Following the lower Secondary students may attend additional schooling or they may enter an apprenticeship.

During the 2012–13 school year, there were a total of 65 students attending classes in Forst-Längenbühl. There were a total of 10 students in the German language kindergarten classes in the municipality. The municipality's primary school had 38 students in German language classes. Of the primary students, 2.6% have a different mother language than the classroom language. During the same year, the lower secondary schools in neighboring municipalities had a total of 17 students from Forst-Längenbühl. There were 11.8% who were permanent or temporary residents of Switzerland (not citizens) and 11.8% have a different mother language than the classroom language.
