= Seftigen District =

Coordinates: 46.8833°N 7.48333°E

Seftigen District Amtsbezirk Seftigen
- District
- Flag Coat of arms

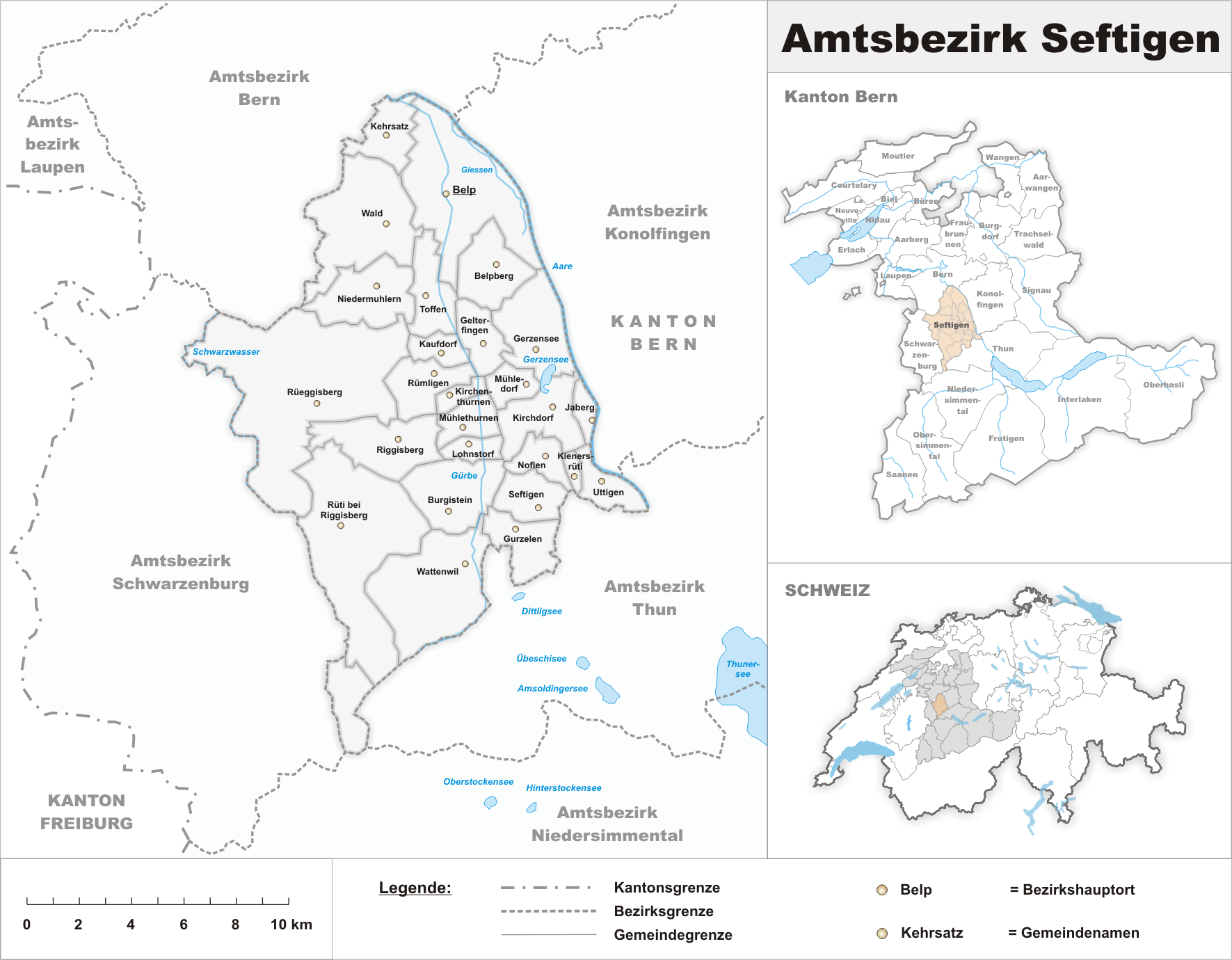
- Country: Switzerland
- Canton: Bern
- Capital: Belp

Area
  - Total: 189 km^{2} (73 sq mi)

Population (2007)
  - Total: 36,739
  - Density: 194/km^{2} (503/sq mi)
- Time zone: UTC+1 (CET)
  - Summer (DST): UTC+2 (CEST)
- Municipalities: 25

Seftigen District is one of the 26 administrative districts in the Canton of Bern, Switzerland. Its capital, while having administrative power, was the municipality of Seftigen.

From 1 January 2010, the district lost its administrative power while seeing its constituent municipalities being divided and partly resettled in the Bern-Mittelland (administrative district), whose administrative centre is Ostermundigen but also in the Thun (administrative district), whose administrative centre being Thun.

Since 2010, it remains therefore a fully recognised district under the law and the Constitution (Art.3 al.2) of the Canton of Bern.

The district has an area of 189 km^{2} and consists of 25 municipalities:

Municipality	Population (Dec 2007)	Area (km^{2})
Belp	9,682	17.6
Belpberg	384	5.7
Burgistein	1,057	7.5
Gelterfingen	250	3.5
Gerzensee	994	7.8
Gurzelen	779	4.5
Jaberg	245	1.3
Kaufdorf	954	2.1
Kehrsatz	3,840	4.4
Kienersrüti	50	0.8
Kirchdorf	849	6.1
Kirchenthurnen	277	1.3
Lohnstorf	228	1.8
Mühledorf (BE)	236	2.3
Mühlethurnen	1,294	2.9
Niedermuhlern	538	7.2
Noflen	234	2.7
Riggisberg	1,933	7.7
Rüeggisberg	1,898	35.7
Rümligen	465	4.7
Seftigen	2,095	3.9
Toffen	2,439	4.9
Uttigen	1,745	3.0
Wald	1,141	13.3
Wattenwil	2,721	14.5
