= Blumenstein =

- Municipality
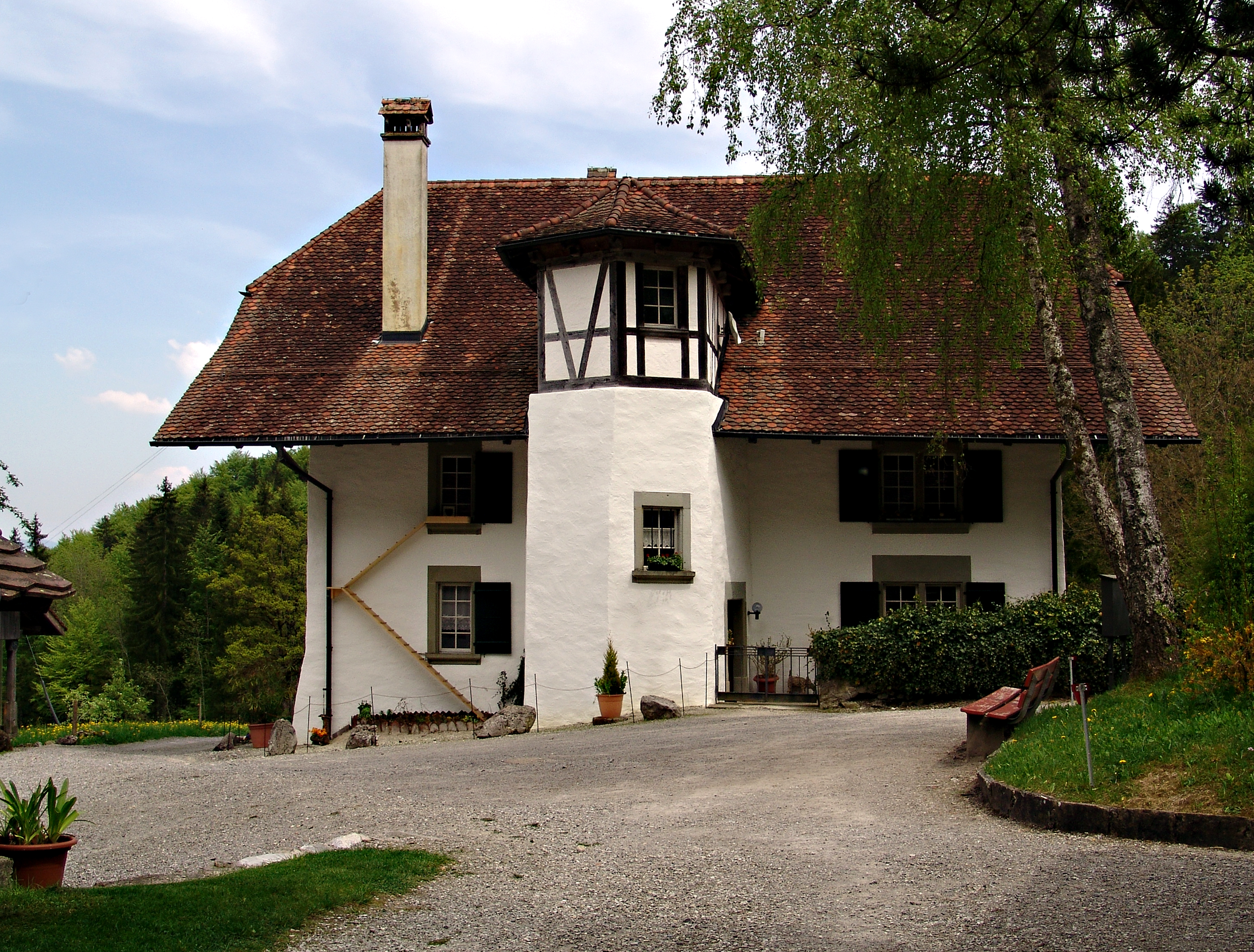
- A house in Blumenstein

- Flag Coat of arms
- Location of Blumenstein
- Location within Switzerland Location within Canton of Bern
- Coordinates: 46°44′N 7°31′E
- Country: Switzerland
- Canton: Bern
- District: Thun

Government
  - Mayor: Regula Hänni

Area
  - Total: 15.52 km^{2} (5.99 sq mi)
- Elevation: 659 m (2,162 ft)

Population (Dec 2012)
  - Total: 1,184
  - Density: 76.29/km^{2} (197.6/sq mi)
- Time zone: UTC+01:00 (CET)
  - Summer (DST): UTC+02:00 (CEST)
- Postal code: 3638
- SFOS number: 922
- ISO 3166 code: CH-BE
- Surrounded by: Därstetten, Forst, Längenbühl, Pohlern, Rüeggisberg, Rüti bei Riggisberg, Uebeschi, Wattenwil
- Website: www.blumenstein.ch

Blumenstein is a municipality in the administrative district of Thun, in the canton of Bern in Switzerland.

== History ==
Mineral spa in Blumenstein, 1790

Blumenstein is first mentioned in 1305 as Bluomenstein. Tannenbühl, which became Outer-Blumenstein in 1859, was first mentioned in 1316 as Tannenbuel.

Inner-Blumenstein was sold in 1348 by Peter von Raron to the city of Bern. Soon thereafter they sold the villages to a family that renamed themselves von Blumenstein. They may have built a castle above the Fallbach as an ancestral seat. In 1386, they sold the village and over the following centuries portions of the village and surroundings were sold or inherited several times. The castle fell into disrepair and was demolished in 1606. In 1642 the last owner, Hans Franz von Wattenwyl, sold the village back to Bern. Under Bernese rule, it became part of the Seftigen district court. In 1652 Blumenstein and Thierachern were both assigned to the district of Thun. Following the 1798 French invasion, Blumenstein became part of the Helvetic Republic district of Oberseftigen. Five years later, with the collapse of the Republic and the Act of Mediation, it was assigned to the Thun District.

The village church of St. Niklaus was probably built in the 11th century. It first appears in the records in 1285. In the 14th century a new building was built on the site of the original church.

Natural mineral springs were discovered in the municipality in the 16th century. Beginning in 1900, the springs became the center of a local spa and health resort. Traditionally most of the residents farmed or raised dairy cattle in alpine meadows. Today about half of the jobs in the municipality are still in agriculture. Just over half of the work force commutes to jobs in nearby cities.

The hamlets of Tannenbühl, Reckenbühl, Bodenzingen and Bühl formed the court of Tannenbühl, which first appears in records during the Late Middle Ages as a part of the Herrschaft of Strättligen. In 1594 it became part of the Herrschaft of Thierachern. A few years later, in 1607, the city of Bern acquired Thierachern and added it into the Thun District. Originally it was part of the parish of Amsoldingen. In 1528 Bern adopted the new faith of the Protestant Reformation and all the parishes in the Canton converted. However, later Protestant offshoots like the Anabaptists were not welcome in the Bern. When they began to settle in the area around Tannenbühl, the church at Amsoldingen was too distant to effectively control the new faith. In 1676 Tannenbühl was assigned to the Blumenstein parish as Outer-Blumenstein. Joining the Blumenstein parish gradually led to closer ties between the two communities and in 1859, they joined into a single political municipality.

== Geography ==
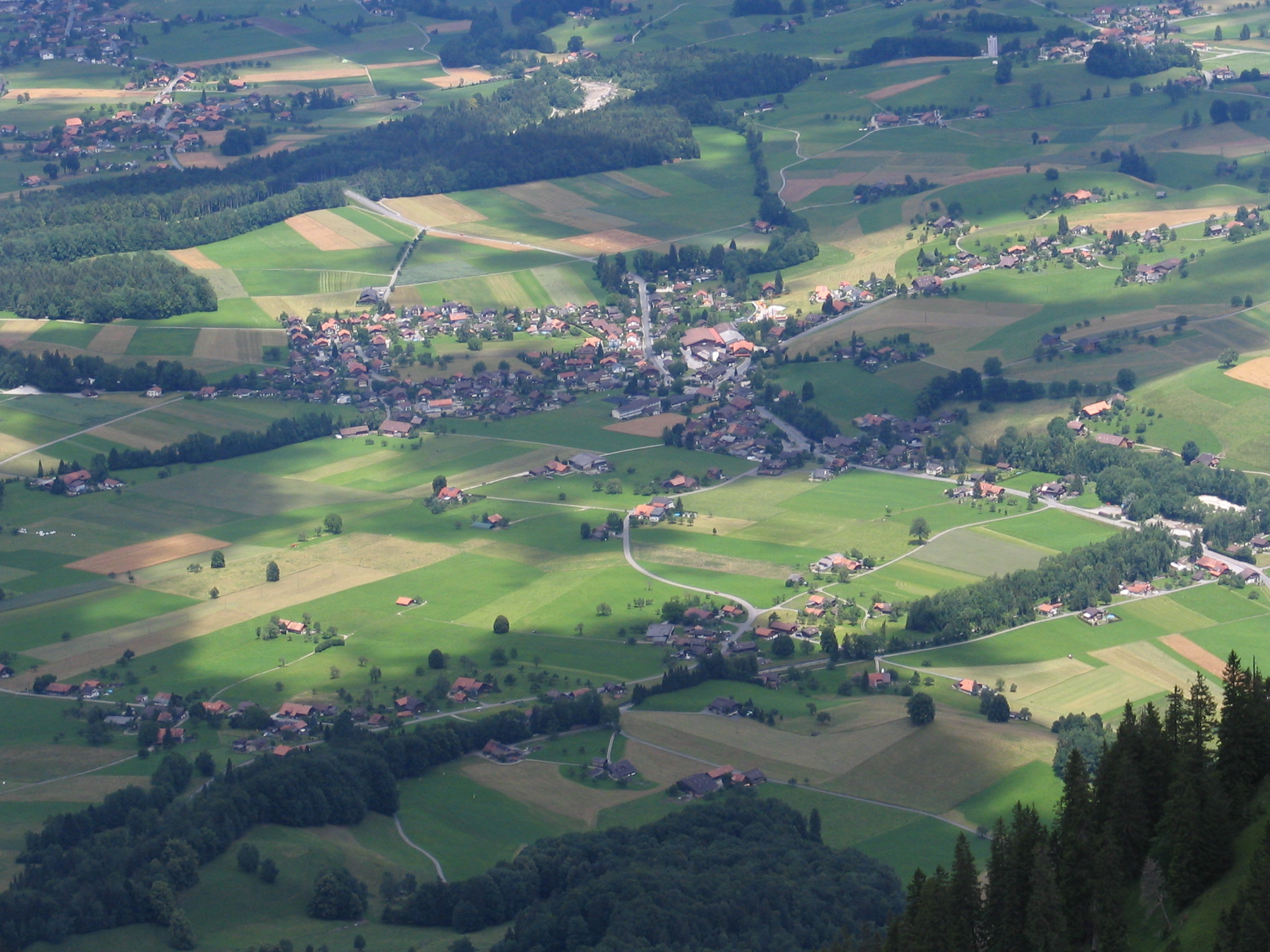
Blumenstein from the air

Blumenstein has an area of 15.52 km^{2} (5.99 sq mi). As of 2012, a total of 7.51 km^{2} (2.90 mi^{2}) or 48.4% is used for agricultural purposes, while 6.19 km^{2} (2.39 mi^{2}) or 39.9% is forested. The rest of the municipality is 0.61 km^{2} (0.24 mi^{2}) or 3.9% is settled (buildings or roads), 0.21 km^{2} (0.081 mi^{2}) or 1.4% is either rivers or lakes and 1.01 km^{2} (0.39 mi^{2}) or 6.5% is unproductive land.

During the same year, housing and buildings made up 2.3% and transportation infrastructure made up 1.3%. A total of 36.2% of the total land area is heavily forested and 2.2% is covered with orchards or small clusters of trees. Of the agricultural land, 8.6% is used for growing crops and 15.3% is pasturage and 23.8% is used for alpine pastures. All the water in the municipality is flowing water. Of the unproductive areas, 4.1% is unproductive vegetation and 2.4% is too rocky for vegetation.

The municipality is located in the Stockental and upper Gürbetal. It includes the village of Blumenstein and the hamlets of Wäsemli, Eschli, Gassen and Rüdeli (all part of Inner-Blumenstein), Lochmannsbühl, Reckenbühl, Bodenzingen and Tannenbühl (known as Outer-Blumenstein). During the 19th Century, what is now Outer-Blumenstein was an independent municipality, known as Tannenbühl. In 1859 it became part of Blumenstein.

On 31 December 2009 Amtsbezirk Thun, the municipality's former district, was dissolved. On the following day, 1 January 2010, it joined the newly created Verwaltungskreis Thun.

== Coat of arms ==
The blazon of the municipal coat of arms is Azure three Lilies Or issuant from as many Rocks Argent. The coat of arms is an example of canting arms with the lilies (German: Blumen) and the rocks (German: Stein).

== Demographics ==
Blumenstein has a population (as of December 2020) of 1,236. As of 2012, 3.4% of the population are resident foreign nationals. Between the last 2 years (2010-2012) the population changed at a rate of 1.1%. Migration accounted for 1.5%, while births and deaths accounted for -0.5%.

Most of the population (as of 2000) speaks German (1,158 or 97.1%) as their first language, Albanian is the second most common (21 or 1.8%) and French is the third (4 or 0.3%). There are 2 people who speak Italian.

As of 2008, the population was 51.2% male and 48.8% female. The population was made up of 582 Swiss men (49.7% of the population) and 17 (1.5%) non-Swiss men. There were 554 Swiss women (47.3%) and 18 (1.5%) non-Swiss women. Of the population in the municipality, 455 or about 38.2% were born in Blumenstein and lived there in 2000. There were 514 or 43.1% who were born in the same canton, while 93 or 7.8% were born somewhere else in Switzerland, and 61 or 5.1% were born outside of Switzerland.

As of 2012, children and teenagers (0–19 years old) make up 19.3% of the population, while adults (20–64 years old) make up 60.2% and seniors (over 64 years old) make up 20.5%.

As of 2000, there were 493 people who were single and never married in the municipality. There were 576 married individuals, 73 widows or widowers and 50 individuals who are divorced.

As of 2010, there were 147 households that consist of only one person and 37 households with five or more people. In 2000, a total of 453 apartments (90.6% of the total) were permanently occupied, while 33 apartments (6.6%) were seasonally occupied and 14 apartments (2.8%) were empty. As of 2012, the construction rate of new housing units was 7.6 new units per 1000 residents. In 2012, single family homes made up 45.6% of the total housing in the municipality.

The historical population is given in the following chart:

== Economy ==
As of 2011, Blumenstein had an unemployment rate of 1.21%. As of 2011, there were a total of 413 people employed in the municipality. Of these, there were 64 people employed in the primary economic sector and about 26 businesses involved in this sector. 170 people were employed in the secondary sector and there were 25 businesses in this sector. 180 people were employed in the tertiary sector, with 52 businesses in this sector. There were 619 residents of the municipality who were employed in some capacity, of which females made up 39.6% of the workforce.

In 2008 there were a total of 260 full-time equivalent jobs. The number of jobs in the primary sector was 49, of which 46 were in agriculture and 3 were in forestry or lumber production. The number of jobs in the secondary sector was 121 of which 79 or (65.3%) were in manufacturing and 42 (34.7%) were in construction. The number of jobs in the tertiary sector was 90. In the tertiary sector; 18 or 20.0% were in wholesale or retail sales or the repair of motor vehicles, 14 or 15.6% were in the movement and storage of goods, 17 or 18.9% were in a hotel or restaurant, 1 was a technical professional or scientist, 12 or 13.3% were in education and 16 or 17.8% were in health care.

In 2000, there were 164 workers who commuted into the municipality and 396 workers who commuted away. The municipality is a net exporter of workers, with about 2.4 workers leaving the municipality for every one entering. A total of 223 workers (57.6% of the 387 total workers in the municipality) both lived and worked in Blumenstein. Of the working population, 13.4% used public transportation to get to work, and 54.3% used a private car.

The local and cantonal tax rate in Blumenstein is one of the lowest in the canton. In 2012 the average local and cantonal tax rate on a married resident, with two children, of Blumenstein making 150,000 CHF was 11.9%, while an unmarried resident's rate was 17.9%. For comparison, the average rate for the entire canton in 2011, was 14.2% and 22.0%, while the nationwide average was 12.3% and 21.1% respectively.

In 2010 there were a total of 486 tax payers in the municipality. Of that total, 136 made over 75,000 CHF per year. There were 6 people who made between 15,000 and 20,000 per year. The greatest number of workers, 151, made between 50,000 and 75,000 CHF per year. The average income of the over 75,000 CHF group in Blumenstein was 102,844 CHF, while the average across all of Switzerland was 131,244 CHF.

In 2011 a total of 0.7% of the population received direct financial assistance from the government.

== Heritage sites of national significance ==
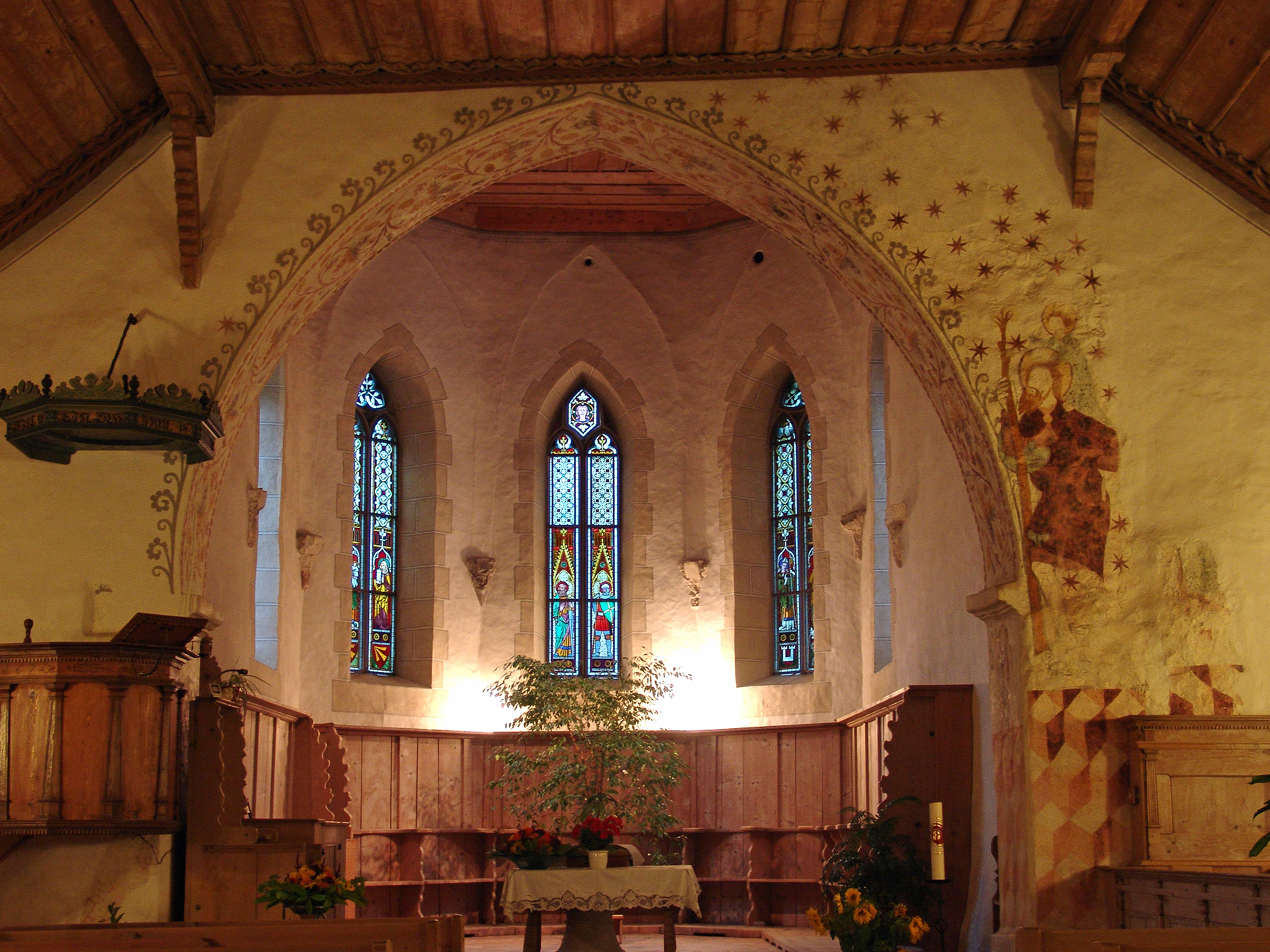
Interior of the Swiss Reformed church

The village Swiss Reformed church is listed as a Swiss heritage site of national significance. The entire hamlets and churches of Blumenstein, Wäsemli and Eschli are part of the Inventory of Swiss Heritage Sites.

== Politics ==
In the 2011 federal election the most popular party was the Swiss People's Party (SVP) which received 42.2% of the vote. The next three most popular parties were the Conservative Democratic Party (BDP) (15.5%), the Social Democratic Party (SP) (13.5%) and the Federal Democratic Union of Switzerland (EDU) (6.0%). In the federal election, a total of 476 votes were cast, and the voter turnout was 49.6%.

== Religion ==
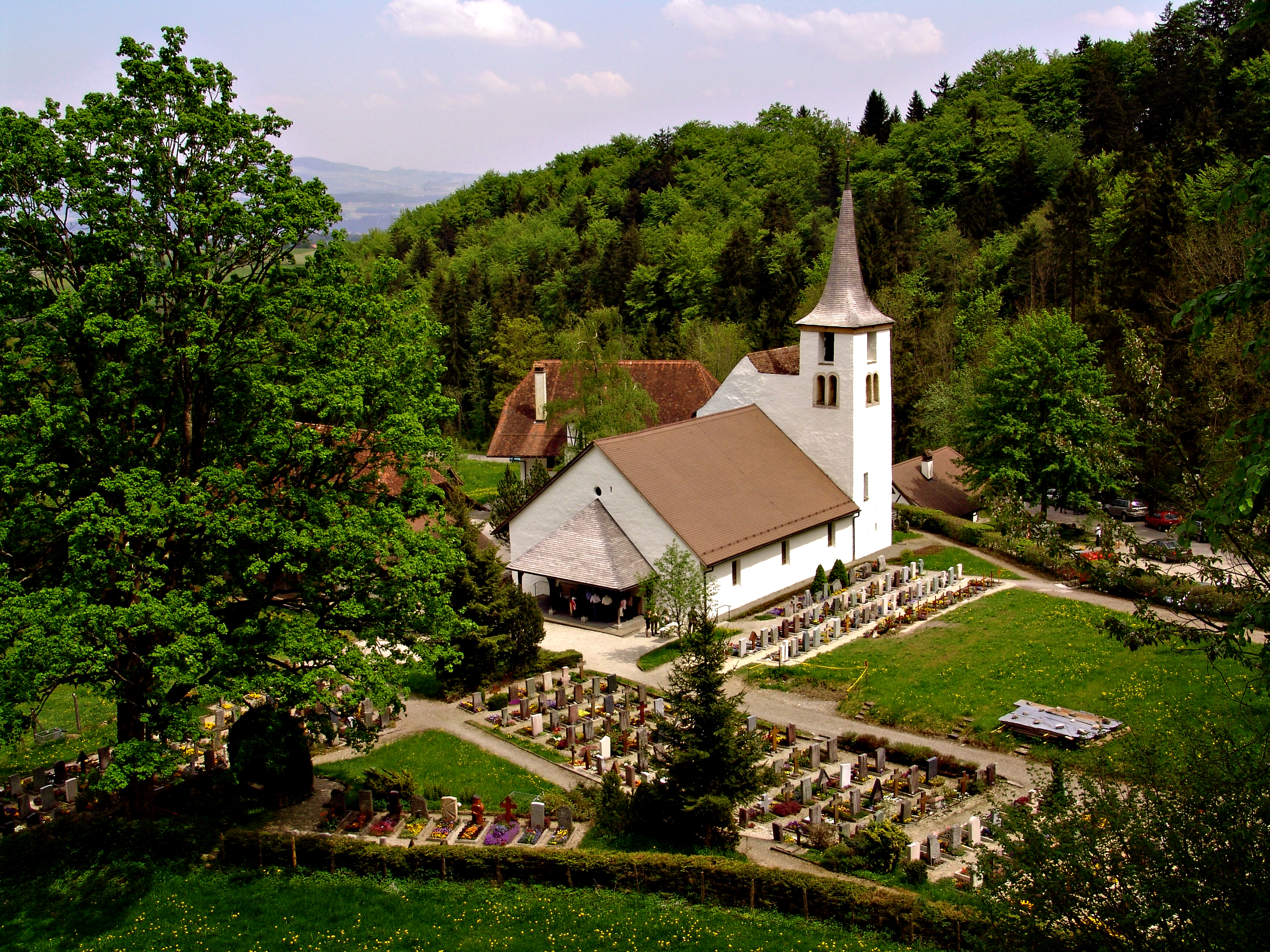
Blumenstein Swiss Reformed church

From the 2000 census, 954 or 80.0% belonged to the Swiss Reformed Church, while 60 or 5.0% were Roman Catholic. Of the rest of the population, there was 1 individual who belongs to the Christian Catholic Church, and there were 46 individuals (or about 3.86% of the population) who belonged to another Christian church. There were 37 (or about 3.10% of the population) who were Muslim. 29 (or about 2.43% of the population) belonged to no church, are agnostic or atheist, and 65 individuals (or about 5.45% of the population) did not answer the question.

== Climate ==
Between 1981 and 2010 Blumenstein had an average of 138.4 days of rain or snow per year and on average received 1,260 mm (50 in) of precipitation. The wettest month was July during which time Blumenstein received an average of 155 mm (6.1 in) of rain or snow. During this month there was precipitation for an average of 12.9 days. The month with the most days of precipitation was May, with an average of 14, but with only 135 mm (5.3 in) of rain or snow. The driest month of the year was January with an average of 68 mm (2.7 in) of precipitation over 10.6 days.

== Education ==
In Blumenstein about 54.1% of the population have completed non-mandatory upper secondary education, and 13.4% have completed additional higher education (either university or a Fachhochschule). Of the 92 who had completed some form of tertiary schooling listed in the census, 80.4% were Swiss men, 15.2% were Swiss women.

The Canton of Bern school system provides one year of non-obligatory Kindergarten, followed by six years of Primary school. This is followed by three years of obligatory lower Secondary school where the students are separated according to ability and aptitude. Following the lower Secondary students may attend additional schooling or they may enter an apprenticeship.

During the 2012-13 school year, there were a total of 119 students attending classes in Blumenstein. There were a total of 42 students in the German language kindergarten classes in the municipality. Of the kindergarten students, 4.8% were permanent or temporary residents of Switzerland (not citizens). The municipality's primary school had 63 students in German language classes. Of the primary students, 1.6% have a different mother language than the classroom language. During the same year, the lower secondary school had a total of 14 students. There were 7.1% who were permanent or temporary residents of Switzerland (not citizens) and 14.3% have a different mother language than the classroom language. The remainder of the students attend a private or special school.

As of 2000, there were a total of 204 students attending any school in the municipality. Of those, 133 both lived and attended school in the municipality, while 71 students came from another municipality. During the same year, 53 residents attended schools outside the municipality.

== Notable people ==
- Sandra Dombrowski, ice hockey player and referee
- Christian Winkler, baker
