= Gurzelen =

- Municipality
- Flag Coat of arms
- Location of Gurzelen
- Location within Switzerland Location within Canton of Bern
- Coordinates: 46°47′N 7°32′E
- Country: Switzerland
- Canton: Bern
- District: Thun

Area
  - Total: 4.5 km^{2} (1.7 sq mi)
- Elevation: 591 m (1,939 ft)

Population (Dec 2011)
  - Total: 822
  - Density: 180/km^{2} (470/sq mi)
- Time zone: UTC+01:00 (CET)
  - Summer (DST): UTC+02:00 (CEST)
- Postal code: 3663
- SFOS number: 867
- ISO 3166 code: CH-BE
- Surrounded by: Burgistein, Forst, Längenbühl, Seftigen, Uetendorf, Wattenwil
- Website: www.gurzelen.ch

Gurzelen is a municipality in the administrative district of Thun in the canton of Bern in Switzerland.

== History ==
Gurzelen is first mentioned in 1230/31 as Gurcellun.

The oldest traces of a settlement in the area are individual neolithic artifacts which were found scattered around the municipality. Hallstatt tombs and a Roman era settlement provide evidence of further inhabitants. By the High Middle Ages the village and surround farmland was owned by a local noble. In the 13th century the estate was divided in half, each with its own village, church and castle. Obergurzelen had a church, a fortified tower and a village. Obergurzelen's tower appears in historical records from 1254 until 1353. Niedergurzelen had another church and a castle, known as the Gesäss, which was first mentioned in 1338. The two halves passed through several noble families, before being reunited and then divided again, this time into three portions. After passing through several additional owners, in 1542 the ownership stabilized for two and a half centuries. The von Wattenwyl zu Burgistein family owned two-thirds of the municipality while the city of Bern owned the rest. Over the centuries both the tower and castle fell into ruin and were abandoned. In 1664 the nearby municipality of Seftigen joined the Gurzelen parish. A new church was built in 1710 and the chapel in Obergurzelen was abandoned and demolished. In 1717 the von Graffenried family acquired the Wattenwyl estates, but the two-thirds split remained. Following the 1798 French invasion, and the creation of the Helvetic Republic the old order was abolished and the three sections were united into the municipality of Gurzelen.

In 1902 the Gürbetal railroad (now part of the BLS) built a station in Gurzelen. While the railroad opened up the municipality, today it is still very rural and agrarian. About two-thirds of the labor force commutes to jobs in Bern and Thun.

== Geography ==
Gurzelen has an area of 4.52 km^{2} (1.75 sq mi). As of 2013, a total of 3.62 km^{2} (1.40 mi^{2}) or 80.1% is used for agricultural purposes, while 0.54 km^{2} (0.21 mi^{2}) or 11.9% is forested. The rest of the municipality is 0.32 km^{2} (0.12 mi^{2}) or 7.1% is settled (buildings or roads), 0.00 km^{2} (0 acres) or 0.0% is either rivers or lakes.

During the same year, housing and buildings made up 5.7% and transportation infrastructure made up 1.1%. A total of 11.5% of the total land area is heavily forested and 0.9% is covered with orchards or small clusters of trees. Of the agricultural land, 40.9% is used for growing crops and 31.2% is pasturage, while 3.5% is used for orchards or vine crops. All the water in the municipality is flowing water.

The municipality is located between the Aare river and upper Gürbetal. It includes the villages of Ober- and Niedergurzelen and scattered farm house clusters and individual houses.

On 31 December 2009 Amtsbezirk Seftigen, the municipality's former district, was dissolved. On the following day, 1 January 2010, it joined the newly created Verwaltungskreis Thun.

== Coat of arms ==
The blazon of the municipal coat of arms is Per pale Gules and Sable a Bend sinister Argent.

== Demographics ==
Gurzelen has a population (as of December 2020) of 884. As of 2011, 2.2% of the population are resident foreign nationals. Over the last year (2010–2011) the population has changed at a rate of 1.2%. Migration accounted for 1.5%, while births and deaths accounted for -0.2%.

Most of the population (as of 2000) speaks German (696 or 97.9%) as their first language, French is the second most common (8 or 1.1%) and Albanian is the third (5 or 0.7%).

As of 2008, the population was 49.4% male and 50.6% female. The population was made up of 392 Swiss men (48.3% of the population) and 9 (1.1%) non-Swiss men. There were 404 Swiss women (49.8%) and 7 (0.9%) non-Swiss women. Of the population in the municipality, 282 or about 39.7% were born in Gurzelen and lived there in 2000. There were 349 or 49.1% who were born in the same canton, while 49 or 6.9% were born somewhere else in Switzerland, and 14 or 2.0% were born outside of Switzerland.

As of 2011, children and teenagers (0–19 years old) make up 26.3% of the population, while adults (20–64 years old) make up 60.3% and seniors (over 64 years old) make up 13.4%.

As of 2000, there were 294 people who were single and never married in the municipality. There were 351 married individuals, 45 widows or widowers and 21 individuals who are divorced.

As of 2010, there were 84 households that consist of only one person and 32 households with five or more people. In 2000, a total of 283 apartments (87.1% of the total) were permanently occupied, while 29 apartments (8.9%) were seasonally occupied and 13 apartments (4.0%) were empty. As of 2010, the construction rate of new housing units was 6.2 new units per 1000 residents. In 2011, single family homes made up 46.5% of the total housing in the municipality.

The historical population is given in the following chart:

== Politics ==
In the 2011 federal election the most popular party was the Swiss People's Party (SVP) which received 41.8% of the vote. The next three most popular parties were the Conservative Democratic Party (BDP) (17.1%), the Social Democratic Party (SP) (9.5%) and the Green Party (8.4%). In the federal election, a total of 325 votes were cast, and the voter turnout was 52.7%.

== Economy ==
As of 2011, Gurzelen had an unemployment rate of 1.03%. As of 2008, there were a total of 159 people employed in the municipality. Of these, there were 89 people employed in the primary economic sector and about 31 businesses involved in this sector. 36 people were employed in the secondary sector and there were 11 businesses in this sector. 34 people were employed in the tertiary sector, with 9 businesses in this sector. There were 378 residents of the municipality who were employed in some capacity, of which females made up 41.5% of the workforce.

In 2008 there were a total of 111 full-time equivalent jobs. The number of jobs in the primary sector was 57, of which 56 were in agriculture and 1 was in forestry or lumber production. The number of jobs in the secondary sector was 32 of which 6 or (18.8%) were in manufacturing and 15 (46.9%) were in construction. The number of jobs in the tertiary sector was 22. In the tertiary sector; 5 or 22.7% were in wholesale or retail sales or the repair of motor vehicles, 2 or 9.1% were in the movement and storage of goods, 1 was in a hotel or restaurant, 2 or 9.1% were technical professionals or scientists, 3 or 13.6% were in education.

In 2000, there were 45 workers who commuted into the municipality and 259 workers who commuted away. The municipality is a net exporter of workers, with about 5.8 workers leaving the municipality for every one entering. A total of 119 workers (72.6% of the 164 total workers in the municipality) both lived and worked in Gurzelen. Of the working population, 11.1% used public transportation to get to work, and 59% used a private car.

In 2011 the average local and cantonal tax rate on a married resident, with two children, of Gurzelen making 150,000 CHF was 12.7%, while an unmarried resident's rate was 18.6%. For comparison, the average rate for the entire canton in the same year, was 14.2% and 22.0%, while the nationwide average was 12.3% and 21.1% respectively.

In 2009 there were a total of 321 tax payers in the municipality. Of that total, 78 made over 75,000 CHF per year. There were 4 people who made between 15,000 and 20,000 per year. The greatest number of workers, 105, made between 50,000 and 75,000 CHF per year. The average income of the over 75,000 CHF group in Gurzelen was 102,318 CHF, while the average across all of Switzerland was 130,478 CHF.

In 2011 a total of 0.5% of the population received direct financial assistance from the government.

== Religion ==
From the 2000 census, 608 or 85.5% belonged to the Swiss Reformed Church, while 22 or 3.1% were Roman Catholic. Of the rest of the population, there was 1 member of an Orthodox church, and there were 18 individuals (or about 2.53% of the population) who belonged to another Christian church. There were 5 (or about 0.70% of the population) who were Muslim. 43 (or about 6.05% of the population) belonged to no church, are agnostic or atheist, and 14 individuals (or about 1.97% of the population) did not answer the question.

== Education ==
In Gurzelen about 65% of the population have completed non-mandatory upper secondary education, and 14.4% have completed additional higher education (either university or a Fachhochschule). Of the 58 who had completed some form of tertiary schooling listed in the census, 72.4% were Swiss men, 24.1% were Swiss women.

The Canton of Bern school system provides one year of non-obligatory Kindergarten, followed by six years of Primary school. This is followed by three years of obligatory lower Secondary school where the students are separated according to ability and aptitude. Following the lower Secondary students may attend additional schooling or they may enter an apprenticeship.

During the 2011–12 school year, there were a total of 87 students attending classes in Gurzelen. There were 2 kindergarten classes with a total of 27 students in the municipality. The municipality had 3 primary classes and 60 students.

As of 2000, there were a total of 63 students attending any school in the municipality. Of those, 62 both lived and attended school in the municipality, while one student came from another municipality. During the same year, 39 residents attended schools outside the municipality.
