= Rüti bei Riggisberg =

- Former municipality
- Flag Coat of arms
- Location of Rüti bei Riggisberg
- Location within Switzerland Location within Canton of Bern
- Coordinates: 46°47′N 7°27′E
- Country: Switzerland
- Canton: Bern
- District: Seftigen

Area
  - Total: 22.2 km^{2} (8.6 sq mi)
- Elevation: 823 m (2,700 ft)

Population (2007)
  - Total: 411
  - Density: 18.5/km^{2} (47.9/sq mi)
- Time zone: UTC+01:00 (CET)
  - Summer (DST): UTC+02:00 (CEST)
- Postal code: 3099
- SFOS number: 882
- ISO 3166 code: CH-BE
- Surrounded by: Blumenstein, Burgistein, Riggisberg, Rüeggisberg, Rüschegg, Wattenwil
- Website: www.rueti-br.ch

Rüti bei Riggisberg is a former municipality in the district of Seftigen in the canton of Bern in Switzerland.

On January 1, 2009, the Rüti bei Riggisberg became part of the municipality of Riggisberg.

== Geography ==
Rüti bei Riggisberg has an area of 22.2 km^{2} (8.6 sq mi). Of this area, 32.1% is used for agricultural purposes, while 64.3% is forested. Of the rest of the land, 2.1% is settled (buildings or roads) and the remainder (1.5%) is non-productive (rivers, glaciers or mountains).

== Demographics ==
Rüti bei Riggisberg has a population of 411. As of 2007, 1.9% of the population was made up of foreign nationals. Over the last 10 years the population has decreased at a rate of -13.1%. Most of the population (as of 2000) speaks German (98.9%), with French being second most common ( 0.7%) and Portuguese being third ( 0.5%).

In the 2007 election the most popular party was the SVP which received 72.7% of the vote. The next three most popular parties were the FDP (8%), the FDP (8%) and the SPS (4.5%).

The age distribution of the population (as of 2000) is children and teenagers (0–19 years old) make up 31.8% of the population, while adults (20–64 years old) make up 51.6% and seniors (over 64 years old) make up 16.7%. In Rüti bei Riggisberg about 60% of the population (between age 25-64) have completed either non-mandatory upper secondary education or additional higher education (either University or a Fachhochschule).

Rüti bei Riggisberg has an unemployment rate of 1.24%. As of 2005, there were 99 people employed in the primary economic sector and about 34 businesses involved in this sector. 46 people are employed in the secondary sector and there are 6 businesses in this sector. 38 people are employed in the tertiary sector, with 7 businesses in this sector.
