= Uetendorf =

- Municipality
- Flag Coat of arms
- Location of Uetendorf
- Location within Switzerland Location within Canton of Bern
- Coordinates: 46°46′N 7°34′E
- Country: Switzerland
- Canton: Bern
- District: Thun

Government
  - Mayor: Albert Rösti SVP/UDC (as of 2014)

Area
  - Total: 10.2 km^{2} (3.9 sq mi)
- Elevation: 558 m (1,831 ft)

Population (Dec 2012)
  - Total: 5,932
  - Density: 582/km^{2} (1,510/sq mi)
- Time zone: UTC+01:00 (CET)
  - Summer (DST): UTC+02:00 (CEST)
- Postal code: 3661
- SFOS number: 944
- ISO 3166 code: CH-BE
- Surrounded by: Gurzelen, Heimberg, Kienersrüti, Längenbühl, Noflen, Seftigen, Thierachern, Thun, Uttigen
- Website: www.uetendorf.ch

Uetendorf (Highest Alemannic: Üetedorf) is a municipality in the administrative district of Thun in the canton of Bern in Switzerland.

Uetendorf is close to the city of Thun, and connected to traffic through the A6 motorway and the BLS AG's Thun-Belp-Bern railway line. Due to its favourable geographic situation, it is home to several small to medium-sized industry companies, most notably the "Sarner Cristal" Glass Hut.

== History ==
Uetendorf is first mentioned in 994 as udendorf.

The number of scattered neolithic, Bronze Age and La Tène artifacts indicate that the area around Uetendorf was home to many prehistoric settlements. During the Roman era, in the 2nd century AD, there was a large country estate near the modern village. After the collapse of the Western Roman Empire the estate probably remained in operation and eventually became a royal estate under the Kings of Burgundy. In 994, Emperor Otto III donated many of his royal estates, including Uetendorf, to support the imperial Selz Abbey in Alsace. The estate and village apparently passed through several owners over the next centuries. In 1232 the Lords of Uetendorf appear in records as members of the city council of Bern. In 1370 they apparently sold Uetendorf to Johann Zeinigen of Thun. He and his descendants owned the village and lands until some time in the 15th century, when they were sold to the hospital in Thun. In 1521 the hospital combined Uetendorf, Längenbühl and Uttigen together into the municipality of Uetendorf in the district court of Seftigen where it remained for over two centuries. In 1783 it became a municipality in the Thun District where it remains today.

The village of Uetendorf was part of the parish of Amsoldingen. In 1528 Bern adopted the new faith of the Protestant Reformation and the entire parish converted. In 1578 it became part of the nearby parish of Thierachern, but remained without its own church until 1955.

The village economy was based on raising crops and livestock in the flood plains and valley floors of the Glütschbach and Kander rivers. However, the frequent floods forced the villages to build and maintain an extensive network of levees and dikes. During the 1860s the Aare River correction projects finally reduced the flood risk and drained the swampy land around the rivers. The projects opened up additional farm land and reduced losses due to flooding.

The completion of the Gürbetal railroad in 1902 connected the village with its neighbors and the growing city of Thun. The railroad brought industry and jobs to the municipality. In 1953 the Selve AG metal works opened in the village. The large factory brought other machinery and engineering companies into the municipality and fueled population growth. Completion of the A8 motorway in 1971 provided another connection for the growing population. Along with small businesses and factories, a waste water treatment plant was built. Today the plant treats water for 32 neighboring communities. When the factory closed in 1993, the local economy was diversified enough that the population remained steady. In 2005 about 70% of the working population commuted to jobs outside the municipality, however about 48% of the jobs in Uetendorf were filled by workers who commuted into the municipality.

The Eichberg estate, which was built in 1792–1793 for Carolus von Fischer, became a boarding school in 1932. The boarding school remained open until 1984. The Uetendorfberg Switzerland Foundation opened a school and residence for the deaf in 1921.

Uetendorf had its own primary school and shared a secondary school with Thierachern. However the secondary school district dissolved in 1959, forcing the municipality to build their own school in that year.

== Geography ==
Uetendorf has an area of 10.17 km^{2} (3.93 sq mi). As of the 2004 survey, a total of 7.22 km^{2} (2.79 mi^{2}) or 71.1% is used for agricultural purposes, while 0.8 km^{2} (0.31 mi^{2}) or 7.9% is forested. Of rest of the municipality 2.12 km^{2} (0.82 mi^{2}) or 20.9% is settled (buildings or roads), 0.02 km^{2} (4.9 acres) or 0.2% is either rivers or lakes. Between the 1981 and 2004 surveys the settled area increased from 1.55 km^{2} (0.60 mi^{2}) to 2.12 km^{2} (0.82 mi^{2}), an increase of 36.77%.

From the same survey, industrial buildings made up 3.5% of the total area while housing and buildings made up 10.2% and transportation infrastructure made up 5.5%. A total of 6.4% of the total land area is heavily forested and 1.5% is covered with orchards or small clusters of trees. Of the agricultural land, 53.4% is used for growing crops and 15.9% is pasturage, while 1.9% is used for orchards or vine crops. All the water in the municipality is flowing water.

The municipality is on the western edge of the Aare valley. It consists of the village of Uetendorf, which is made up of the Dorf, Berg and Allmend neighborhoods, as well as scattered farm houses.

On 31 December 2009 Amtsbezirk Thun, the municipality's former district, was dissolved. On the following day, 1 January 2010, it joined the newly created Verwaltungskreis Thun.

== Coat of arms ==
The blazon of the municipal coat of arms is "Azure on a Bend Argent three Roses Gules barbed and seeded proper".

== Demographics ==
Uetendorf has a population (as of December 2020) of 5,830. As of 2012, 5.7% of the population are resident foreign nationals. Between the last two years (2010-2012) the population changed at a rate of -0.8%. Migration accounted for -1.4%, while births and deaths accounted for -0.1%.

Most of the population (as of 2000) speaks German (5,434 or 95.3%) as their first language, Albanian is the second most common (44 or 0.8%) and various African languages (not further specified) are the third (43 or 0.8%). There are 41 people who speak French, 31 people who speak Italian and one person who speaks Romansh.

As of 2013, the population was 49.6% male and 50.4% female. The population was composed of 2,756 Swiss men (46.2% of the population) and 202 (3.4%) non-Swiss men. There were 2,845 Swiss women (47.7%) and 163 (2.7%) non-Swiss women. Of the population in the municipality, 1,426 or about 25.0% were born in Uetendorf and lived there in 2000. There were 3,000 or 52.6% who were born in the same canton, while 667 or 11.7% were born somewhere else in Switzerland, and 397 or 7.0% were born outside of Switzerland.

As of 2012, children and teenagers (0–19 years old) make up 20.0% of the population, while adults (20–64 years old) make up 60.0% and seniors (over 64 years old) make up 20.0%.

As of 2000, there were 2,258 people who were single and never married in the municipality. There were 2,878 married individuals, 293 widows or widowers and 273 individuals who are divorced.

As of 2010, there were 720 households that consisted of only one person and 140 households with five or more people. In 2000, a total of 2,223 apartments (93.4% of the total) were permanently occupied, while 108 apartments (4.5%) were seasonally occupied and 50 apartments (2.1%) were empty. As of 2012, the construction rate of new housing units was 1.5 new units per 1000 residents. The vacancy rate for the municipality, in 2013, was 0.5%. In 2012, single family homes made up 58.5% of the total housing in the municipality.

The historical population is given in the following chart:

== Economy ==
As of 2011, Uetendorf had an unemployment rate of 1.2%. As of 2011, there were a total of 3,111 people employed in the municipality. Of these, there were 127 people employed in the primary economic sector and about 46 businesses involved in this sector. The secondary sector employs 1,227 people and there were 115 businesses in this sector. The tertiary sector employs 1,757 people, with 322 businesses in this sector. There were 3,057 residents of the municipality who were employed in some capacity, of which females made up 41.4% of the workforce.

In 2008 there were a total of 2,395 full-time equivalent jobs. The number of jobs in the primary sector was 87, all of which were in agriculture. The number of jobs in the secondary sector was 1,163 of which 556 or (47.8%) were in manufacturing and 584 (50.2%) were in construction. The number of jobs in the tertiary sector was 1,145. In the tertiary sector; 480 or 41.9% were in wholesale or retail sales or the repair of motor vehicles, 95 or 8.3% were in the movement and storage of goods, 24 or 2.1% were in a hotel or restaurant, 24 or 2.1% were in the information industry, 99 or 8.6% were technical professionals or scientists, 65 or 5.7% were in education and 157 or 13.7% were in health care.

In 2000, there were 1,464 workers who commuted into the municipality and 2,157 workers who commuted away. The municipality is a net exporter of workers, with about 1.5 workers leaving the municipality for every one entering. A total of 900 workers (38.1% of the 2,364 total workers in the municipality) both lived and worked in Uetendorf. Of the working population, 16.5% used public transportation to get to work, and 51.8% used a private car.

The local and cantonal tax rate in Uetendorf is one of the lowest in the canton. In 2012 the average local and cantonal tax rate on a married resident, with two children, of Uetendorf making 150,000 CHF was 11.5%, while an unmarried resident's rate was 17.2%. For comparison, the average rate for the entire canton in 2011, was 14.2% and 22.0%, while the nationwide average was 12.3% and 21.1% respectively.

In 2010 there were a total of 2,688 tax payers in the municipality. Of that total, 890 made over 75,000 CHF per year. There were 17 people who made between 15,000 and 20,000 per year. The average income of the over 75,000 CHF group in Uetendorf was 109,635 CHF, while the average across all of Switzerland was 131,244 CHF.

In 2011 a total of 1.9% of the population received direct financial assistance from the government.

== Politics ==
In the 2011 federal election the most popular party was the Swiss People's Party (SVP) which received 37.3% of the vote. The next three most popular parties were the Conservative Democratic Party (BDP) (15.8%), the Social Democratic Party (SP) (13.7%) and the Green Party (7.6%). In the federal election, a total of 2,407 votes were cast, and the voter turnout was 51.8%.

== Religion ==
From the 2000 census, 4,333 or 76.0% belonged to the Swiss Reformed Church, while 514 or 9.0% were Roman Catholic. Of the rest of the population, there were 19 members of an Orthodox church (or about 0.33% of the population), there were four persons (or about 0.07% of the population) who belonged to the Christian Catholic Church, and there were 234 (or about 4.10% of the population) who belonged to another Christian church. There were six individuals (or about 0.11% of the population) who were Jewish, and 137 (or about 2.40% of the population) who were Muslim. There were 11 persons who were Buddhist, four individuals who were Hindu and 10 persons who belonged to another church. Two hundred seventy-two (or about 4.77% of the population) belonged to no church, are agnostic or atheist, and 158 individuals (or about 2.77% of the population) did not answer the question.

== Education ==
In Uetendorf about 62.5% of the population have completed non-mandatory upper secondary education, and 15.7% have completed additional higher education (either university or a Fachhochschule). Of the 575 who had completed some form of tertiary schooling listed in the census, 79.1% were Swiss men, 17.9% were Swiss women, 2.6% were non-Swiss men.

The Canton of Bern school system provides one year of non-obligatory Kindergarten, followed by six years of primary school. This is followed by three years of obligatory lower secondary school where the students are separated according to ability and aptitude. Following the lower secondary students may attend additional schooling or they may enter an apprenticeship.

During the 2012–13 school year, there were a total of 649 students attending classes in Uetendorf. There were a total of 103 students in the German language kindergarten classes in the municipality. Of the kindergarten students, 4.9% were permanent or temporary residents of Switzerland (not citizens) and 3.9% have a different mother language than the classroom language. The municipality's primary school had 323 students in German language classes. Of the primary students, 7.7% were permanent or temporary residents of Switzerland (not citizens) and 9.6% have a different mother language than the classroom language. During the same year, the lower secondary school had a total of 223 students. There were 6.7% who were permanent or temporary residents of Switzerland (not citizens) and 12.6% have a different mother language than the classroom language.

As of 2000, there were a total of 758 students attending any school in the municipality. Of those, 715 both lived and attended school in the municipality, while 43 students came from another municipality. During the same year, 115 residents attended schools outside the municipality.

Uetendorf is home to the Bibliothek Uetendorf library. The library has (as of 2008) 14,775 books or other media, and loaned out 40,108 items in the same year. It was open a total of 250 days with average of 12 hours per week during that year.
