= Zwieselberg =

- Former municipality
- Flag Coat of arms
- Location of Zwieselberg
- Location within Switzerland Location within Canton of Bern
- Coordinates: 46°42′N 7°37′E
- Country: Switzerland
- Canton: Bern
- District: Thun

Government
  - Mayor: Ulrich Zurbuchen

Area
  - Total: 2.46 km^{2} (0.95 sq mi)
- Elevation: 660 m (2,170 ft)

Population (Dec 2012)
  - Total: 282
  - Density: 115/km^{2} (297/sq mi)
- Time zone: UTC+01:00 (CET)
  - Summer (DST): UTC+02:00 (CEST)
- Postal code: 3645
- SFOS number: 947
- ISO 3166 code: CH-BE
- Surrounded by: Amsoldingen, Höfen, Reutigen, Spiez, Thun
- Website: www.zwieselberg.ch

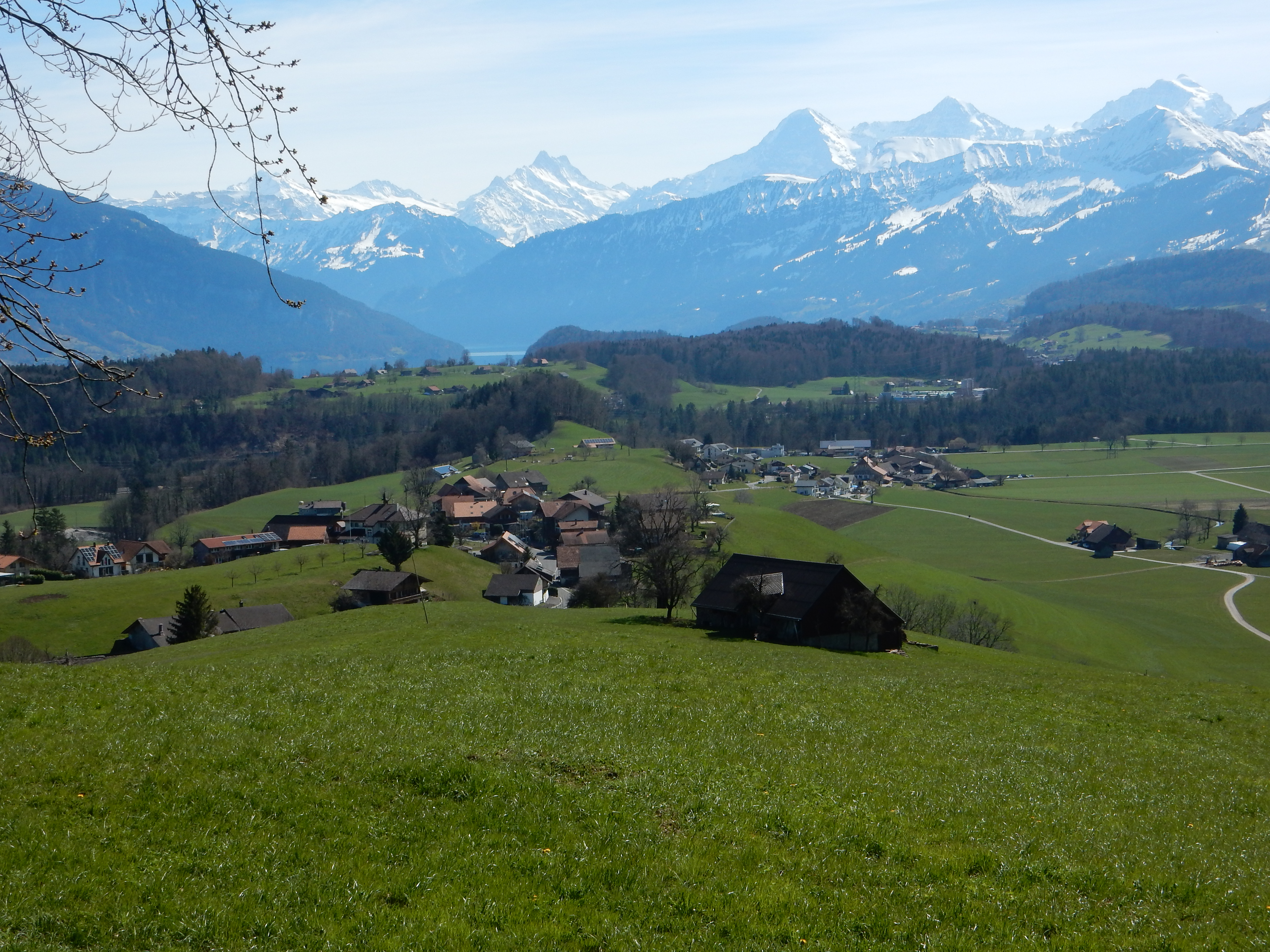
Houses of Zwieselberg

Zwieselberg is a former municipality in the administrative district of Thun in the canton of Bern in Switzerland. On 1 January 2024 the former municipality of Zwieselberg merged to form the municipality of Reutigen.

== History ==
Zwieselberg is first mentioned in 1345 as der Zwiselberg.

The oldest trace of a settlement in the area are a Bronze Age ruin at Bürgli and a grave at Bühl. A small Roman settlement was built on the ruin at Bürgli. The Romans also built a lime kiln at Chalchmädere. During the Middle Ages the region was part of the Herrschaft of Strättligen. In 1466 the Bernese Lords of Bubenberg acquired the Strättligen lands, including Zwieselberg. Toward the end of the 15th century, the Bubenbergs sold or gave Zwieselberg and the surrounding lands to the city of Bern. Under Bernese rule it was part of the bailiwick of Wimmis, the military levy of Seftigen and the religious parish of Amsoldingen. Following the 1798 French invasion and 1803 Act of Mediation it joined the newly created Thun District.

In 1815 the Simmentalstrasse connected the old horse stations of Hani and Glütsch in Zwieselberg to the rest of the canton. The municipality has remained rural and generally agrarian. Today about half of the local jobs are in agriculture, though nearly three-quarters of the working population commutes to jobs in or around Bern and Thun.

In 2008 Zwieselberg, Reutigen, Oberstocken and Niederstocken formed the Stockental School District.

== Geography ==
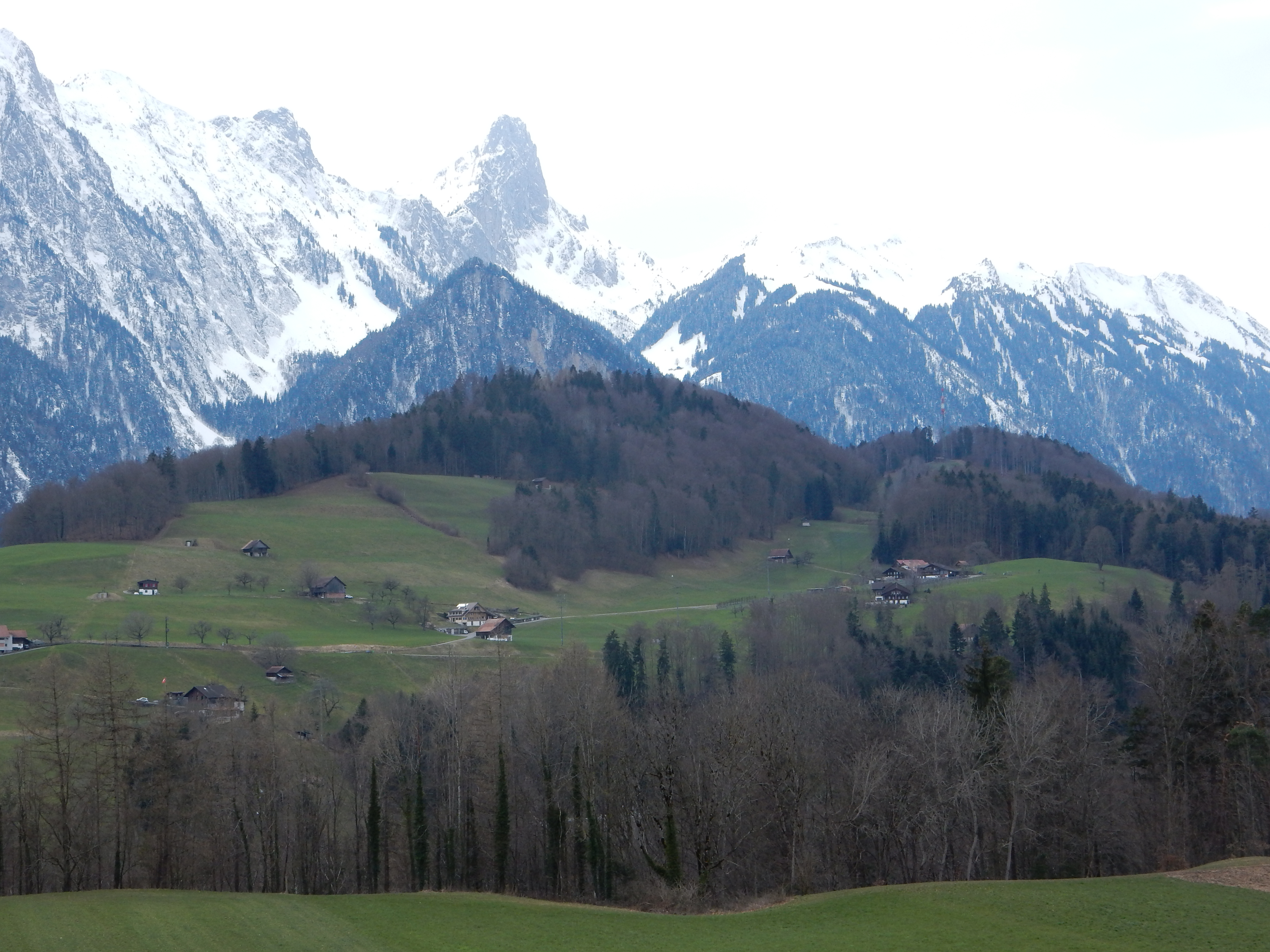
The hills of Zwieselberg

Zwieselberg has an area of 2.46 km^{2} (0.95 sq mi). As of the 2004 survey, a total of 1.54 km^{2} (0.59 mi^{2}) or 62.9% is used for agricultural purposes, while 0.64 km^{2} (0.25 mi^{2}) or 26.1% is forested. Of rest of the municipality 0.24 km^{2} (0.093 mi^{2}) or 9.8% is settled (buildings or roads), 0.01 km^{2} (2.5 acres) or 0.4% is either rivers or lakes. Between the 1981 and 2004 surveys the settled area increased from 0.17 km^{2} (0.066 mi^{2}) to 0.24 km^{2} (0.093 mi^{2}), an increase of 41.18%.

From the same survey, industrial buildings made up 2.4% of the total area while housing and buildings made up 4.5% and transportation infrastructure made up 2.9%. All of the forested land area is covered with heavy forests. Of the agricultural land, 22.4% is used for growing crops and 36.7% is pasturage, while 3.7% is used for orchards or vine crops. All the water in the municipality is flowing water.

The municipality is located in the Zwieselburg hills between the Reutigmoos and the Glütschbach Valley. It consists of a number of small, scattered farm houses in the hills.

On 31 December 2009 Amtsbezirk Thun, the municipality's former district, was dissolved. On the following day, 1 January 2010, it joined the newly created Verwaltungskreis Thun.

== Coat of arms ==
The blazon of the municipal coat of arms is Gules a Castle Argent on a Mount of 3 Coupeaux Vert and in Chief a Mullet Or between two Roses of the second barbed and seeded proper.

== Demographics ==
Zwieselberg has a population (as of December 2020) of 322. As of 2012, 1.4% of the population are resident foreign nationals. Between the last 2 years (2010–2012) the population changed at a rate of 4.4%. Migration accounted for 4.1%, while births and deaths accounted for 0.7%.

All of the population (as of 2000) speaks German as their first language.

As of 2013, the population was 49.8% male and 50.2% female. The population was made up of 143 Swiss men (49.5% of the population) and 1 (0.3%) non-Swiss men. There were 142 Swiss women (49.1%) and 3 (1.0%) non-Swiss women. Of the population in the municipality, 85 or about 36.0% were born in Zwieselberg and lived there in 2000. There were 118 or 50.0% who were born in the same canton, while 26 or 11.0% were born somewhere else in Switzerland, and 2 or 0.8% were born outside of Switzerland.

As of 2012, children and teenagers (0–19 years old) make up 28.0% of the population, while adults (20–64 years old) make up 56.0% and seniors (over 64 years old) make up 16.0%.

As of 2000, there were 105 people who were single and never married in the municipality. There were 110 married individuals, 15 widows or widowers and 6 individuals who are divorced.

As of 2010, there were 21 households that consist of only one person and 11 households with five or more people. In 2000, a total of 91 apartments (89.2% of the total) were permanently occupied, while 6 apartments (5.9%) were seasonally occupied and 5 apartments (4.9%) were empty. As of 2012, the construction rate of new housing units was 10.6 new units per 1000 residents. The vacancy rate for the municipality, in 2013, was 5.0%. In 2012, single family homes made up 42.9% of the total housing in the municipality.

The historical population is given in the following chart:

== Economy ==
As of 2011, Zwieselberg had an unemployment rate of 0.88%. As of 2011, there were a total of 67 people employed in the municipality. Of these, there were 28 people employed in the primary economic sector and about 9 businesses involved in this sector. The secondary sector employs 6 people and there were 2 businesses in this sector. The tertiary sector employs 33 people, with 16 businesses in this sector. There were 132 residents of the municipality who were employed in some capacity, of which females made up 43.9% of the workforce.

In 2008 there were a total of 34 full-time equivalent jobs. The number of jobs in the primary sector was 17, all in agriculture. The number of jobs in the secondary sector was 8 of which 2 were in manufacturing and 6 were in construction. The number of jobs in the tertiary sector was 9; 2 in wholesale or retail sales or the repair of motor vehicles, 1 was a technical professional or scientist and 2 were in education.

In 2000, there were 6 workers who commuted into the municipality and 94 workers who commuted away. The municipality is a net exporter of workers, with about 15.7 workers leaving the municipality for every one entering. A total of 38 workers (86.4% of the 44 total workers in the municipality) both lived and worked in Zwieselberg. Of the working population, 9.8% used public transportation to get to work, and 59.8% used a private car.

The local and cantonal tax rate in Zwieselberg is one of the lowest in the canton. In 2012 the average local and cantonal tax rate on a married resident, with two children, of Zwieselberg making 150,000 CHF was 12.6%, while an unmarried resident's rate was 18.9%. For comparison, the average rate for the entire canton in 2011, was 14.2% and 22.0%, while the nationwide average was 12.3% and 21.1% respectively. In 2010 there were a total of 98 tax payers in the municipality. Of that total, 30 made over 75,000 CHF per year. The average income of the over 75,000 CHF group in Zwieselberg was 113,460 CHF, while the average across all of Switzerland was 131,244 CHF.

In 2011 a total of 1.8% of the population received direct financial assistance from the government.

== Politics ==
In the 2011 federal election the most popular party was the Swiss People's Party (SVP) which received 40.8% of the vote. The next three most popular parties were the Conservative Democratic Party (BDP) (18.0%), the Social Democratic Party (SP) (12.2%) and the Green Party (10.9%). In the federal election, a total of 111 votes were cast, and the voter turnout was 53.6%.

== Religion ==
From the 2000 census, 203 or 86.0% belonged to the Swiss Reformed Church, while 11 or 4.7% were Roman Catholic. Of the rest of the population, there were 6 individuals (or about 2.54% of the population) who belonged to another Christian church. 13 (or about 5.51% of the population) belonged to no church, are agnostic or atheist, and 3 individuals (or about 1.27% of the population) did not answer the question.

== Education ==
In Zwieselberg about 58.5% of the population have completed non-mandatory upper secondary education, and 23.1% have completed additional higher education (either university or a Fachhochschule). Of the 31 who had completed some form of tertiary schooling listed in the census, 61.3% were Swiss men, 38.7% were Swiss women.

The Canton of Bern school system provides one year of non-obligatory Kindergarten, followed by six years of Primary school. This is followed by three years of obligatory lower Secondary school where the students are separated according to ability and aptitude. Following the lower Secondary students may attend additional schooling or they may enter an apprenticeship.

During the 2012–13 school year, there were a total of 17 students attending classes in the primary school in Zwieselberg.

As of 2000, there were a total of 11 students attending any school in the municipality. Of those, 11 both lived and attended school in the municipality, while 14 students from Zwieselberg attended schools outside the municipality.
