= Burgistein Castle =

Castle in Bern, Switzerland

- Schloss Burgistein
- Burgistein
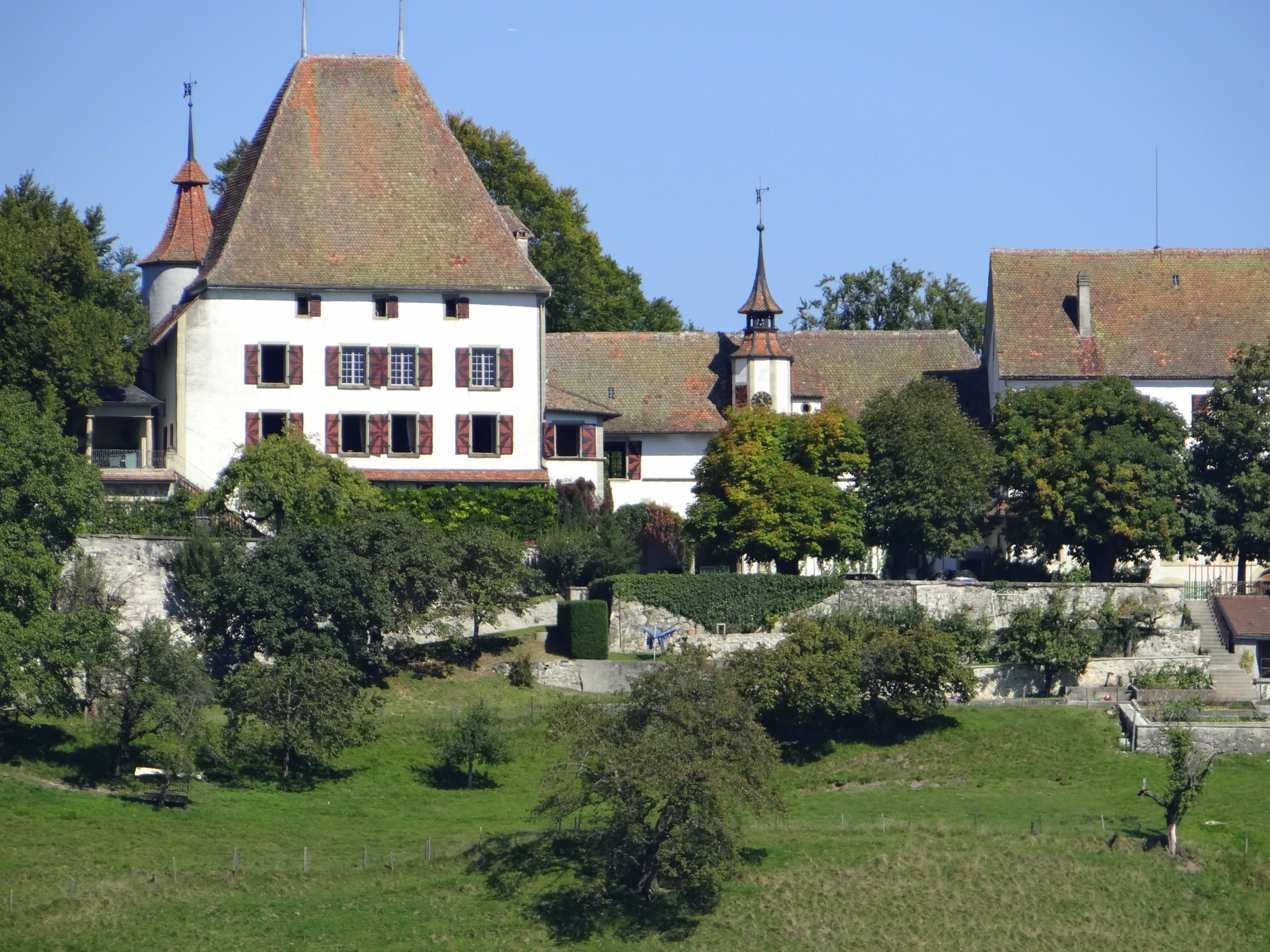
- Burgistein Castle

Site information
- Owner: Canton of Bern

Location
- Coordinates: 46.787203°N 7.505297°E

Site history
- Built: 1260
- Built by: Jordan I of Thun

Burgistein Castle (German: Schloss Burgistein) is a castle in the municipality of Burgistein in the canton of Bern in Switzerland. It is a Swiss heritage site of national significance.

== History ==
The first castle at Burgistein was built by Jordan I of Thun (later of Burgistein) in 1260. Jordan III of Burgistein fought on the losing side in the Battle of Laupen in 1339. In retaliation a Bernese army attacked and destroyed the castle in 1340. It was rebuilt in the following years. In 1397 the Burgistein family died out and the castle was inherited by Werner Münzer. Over the following century it passed through numerous owners until 1484 when the Wattenwyl family acquired it. They owned the castle until 1714, when it passed to the Graffenried family. The 14th-century castle was rebuilt in the 15th and 16th centuries.

== See also ==
- List of castles in Switzerland

== Notes ==
1 The Gesellschaft für Schweizerische Kunstgeschichte (GSK) lists these dates as 1484 and 1714, while the Historical Dictionary of Switzerland says 1493 and 1717
