= Dittligsee =

Lake in Bern, Switzerland

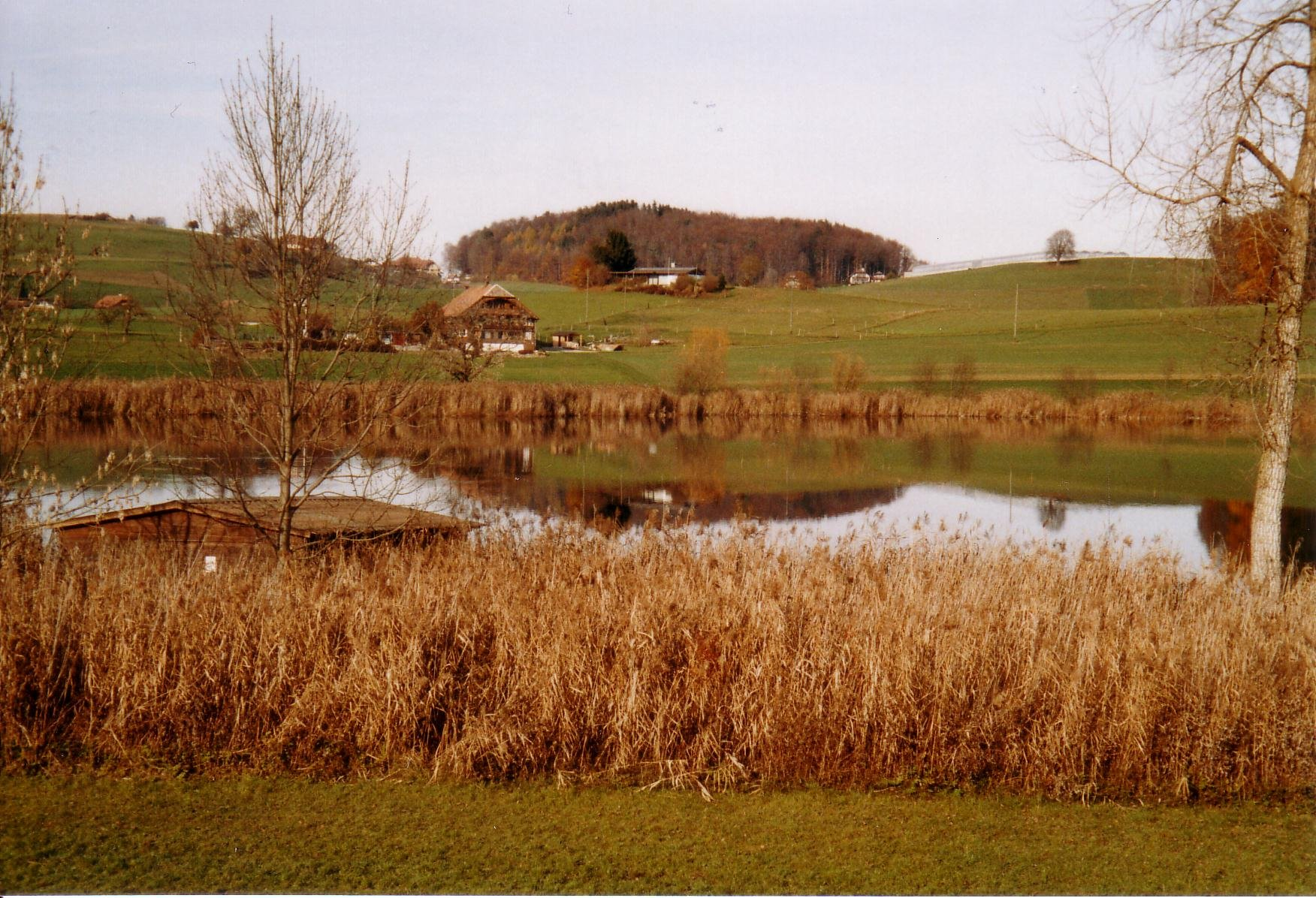

- Location within Canton of Bern Location within Switzerland Location within Alps
- Interactive map of Dittligsee
- Location: Canton of Bern
- Coordinates: 46°45′22″N 7°32′1″E
- Primary outflows: Fallbach
- Basin countries: Switzerland
- Surface area: 6.02 ha (14.9 acres)
- Max. depth: 16.4 m (54 ft)
- Surface elevation: 652 m (2,139 ft)

Dittligsee is a lake in the canton of Bern, Switzerland, near Blumenstein and Wattenwil. Its surface area is 6.02 ha (14.9 acres).

== Description ==
The lake is situated at an elevation of 652m (2,139 ft) and is almost completely surrounded by reed. Water is deposited into the lake via drainage pipes, while the lake itself flows into a stream, Fallbach.

== Attractions ==
Other than a small wooden pier, the lake is mostly inaccessible.
