= Thun (administrative district) =

Coordinates: 46°45′N 7°37′E

Thun District Verwaltungskreis Thun
- District
- Country: Switzerland
- Canton: Bern
- Capital: Thun

Area
  - Total: 322 km^{2} (124 sq mi)

Population (2008)
  - Total: 103,233
  - Density: 321/km^{2} (830/sq mi)
- Time zone: UTC+1 (CET)
  - Summer (DST): UTC+2 (CEST)
- Municipalities: 30

Thun District in the Canton of Bern, Switzerland was created on 1 January 2010. It is part of the Oberland administrative region. It contains 31 municipalities with an area of 321.90 km^{2} (124.29 sq mi) and a population (as of December 2008) of 103,233.

| Coat of arms | Name | Population (31 December 2020) | Area in km^{2} |
|---|---|---|---|
| Amsoldingen | Amsoldingen | 800 | 4.70 |
| Blumenstein | Blumenstein | 1,236 | 15.52 |
| Buchholterberg | Buchholterberg | 1,519 | 15.33 |
| Burgistein | Burgistein | 1,093 | 7.53 |
| Eriz | Eriz | 485 | 21.78 |
| Fahrni | Fahrni | 811 | 6.67 |
| Forst-Längenbühl | Forst-Längenbühl | 769 | 4.50 |
| Gurzelen | Gurzelen | 884 | 4.54 |
| Heiligenschwendi | Heiligenschwendi | 725 | 5.55 |
| Heimberg | Heimberg | 6,968 | 5.42 |
| Hilterfingen | Hilterfingen | 4,094 | 2.83 |
| Homberg | Homberg | 510 | 6.51 |
| Horrenbach-Buchen | Horrenbach-Buchen | 226 | 20.43 |
| Oberhofen am Thunersee | Oberhofen am Thunersee | 2,445 | 2.72 |
| Oberlangenegg | Oberlangenegg | 483 | 9.12 |
| Stocken-Höfen | Stocken-Höfen | 1,041 | 14.22 |
| Pohlern | Pohlern | 232 | 9.89 |
| Reutigen | Reutigen | 1,023 | 13.71 |
| Seftigen | Seftigen | 2,147 | 3.89 |
| Sigriswil | Sigriswil | 4,847 | 55.41 |
| Steffisburg | Steffisburg | 15,991 | 13.35 |
| Teuffenthal | Teuffenthal | 160 | 4.52 |
| Thierachern | Thierachern | 2,514 | 7.51 |
| Thun | Thun | 43,476 | 21.57 |
| Uebeschi | Uebeschi | 718 | 4.40 |
| Uetendorf | Uetendorf | 5,830 | 10.15 |
| Unterlangenegg | Unterlangenegg | 1,018 | 6.80 |
| Uttigen | Uttigen | 2,153 | 3.81 |
| Wachseldorn | Wachseldorn | 229 | 3.52 |
| Wattenwil | Wattenwil | 3,060 | 14.54 |
| | Total | 107,809 | 321.90 |

== Mergers ==
- On 1 January 2014 the former municipalities of Niederstocken, Oberstocken and Höfen merged into the municipality of Stocken-Höfen and the former municipality of Kienersrüti merged into the municipality of Uttigen.
- On 1 January 2020 the former municipality of Schwendibach merged into the municipality of Steffisburg.
- On 1 January 2024 the former municipality of Zwieselberg merged into the municipality of Reutigen.
