= Burgistein =

- Municipality
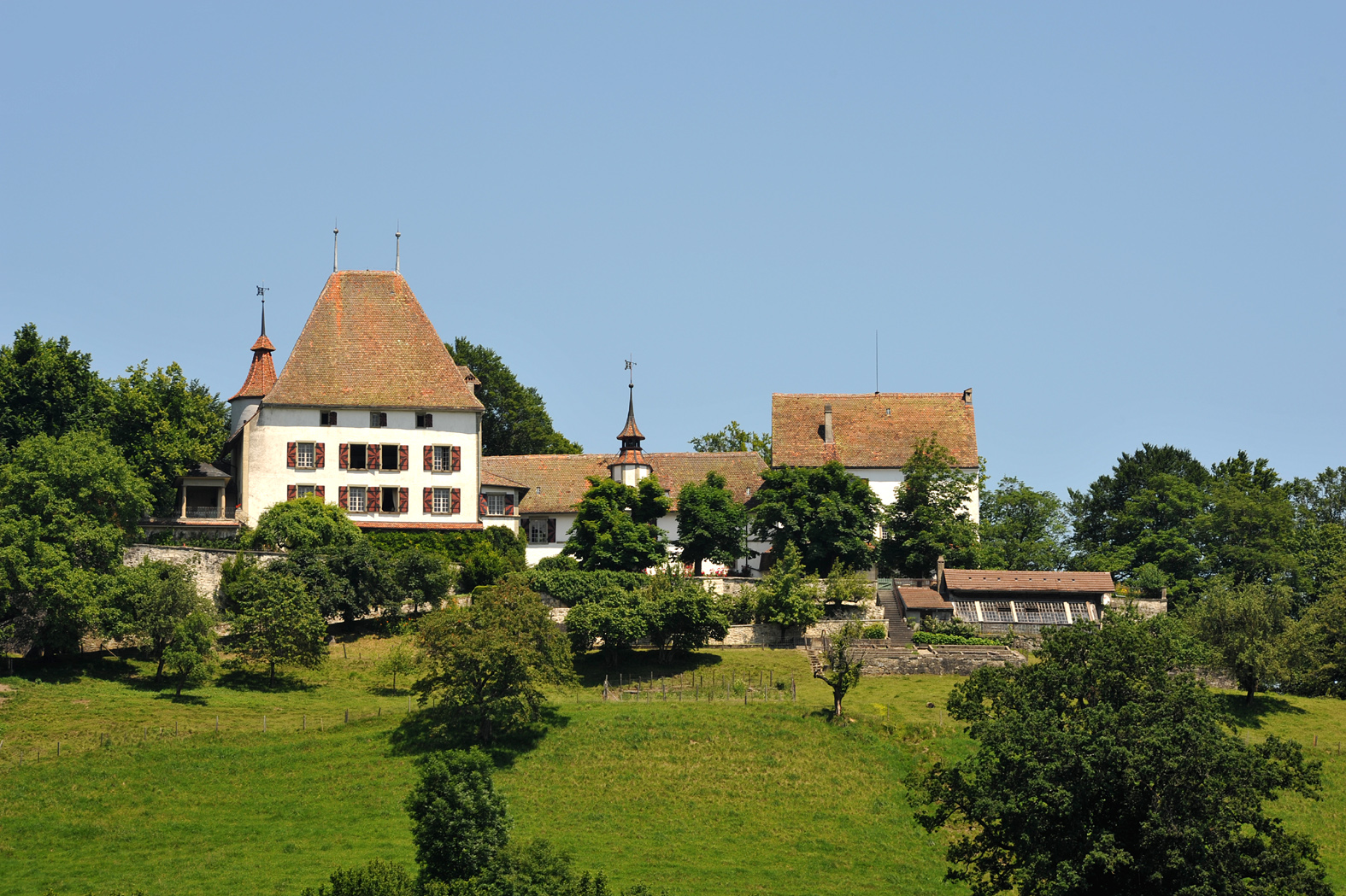
- Burgistein Castle

- Flag Coat of arms
- Location of Burgistein
- Location within Switzerland Location within Canton of Bern
- Coordinates: 46°47′N 7°30′E
- Country: Switzerland
- Canton: Bern
- District: Thun

Area
  - Total: 7.5 km^{2} (2.9 sq mi)
- Elevation: 763 m (2,503 ft)

Population (Dec 2011)
  - Total: 1,021
  - Density: 140/km^{2} (350/sq mi)
- Time zone: UTC+01:00 (CET)
  - Summer (DST): UTC+02:00 (CEST)
- Postal code: 3664
- SFOS number: 863
- ISO 3166 code: CH-BE
- Surrounded by: Gurzelen, Kirchdorf, Lohnstorf, Noflen, Riggisberg, Rüti bei Riggisberg, Seftigen, Wattenwil
- Website: www.burgistein.ch

Burgistein is a municipality in the administrative district of Thun in the canton of Bern in Switzerland.

== History ==
Burgistein is first mentioned in 1266 as Burgstein and in 1271 as Burgenstein.

The oldest traces of a settlement in the area include scattered neolithic artifacts and Roman coins. During the Early to High Middle Ages there was a hill fort on Bühlhölzli hill. Across from Bühlhölzli, on Schönegg hill, are the ruins of Blankenberg Castle, which was demolished in the second half of the 14th century. During the 13th century, Jordan I of Thun began buying up farming villages and land in the Gürbetal and surrounding valleys. In 1260 he combined the scattered estates into a Herrschaft and built Burgistein Castle. By 1266 he was calling himself Jordan von Burgistein after the castle. In 1340, after the Bernese victory in the Battle of Laupen in the previous year, Burgistein Castle was destroyed in retaliation for Burgistein support against Bern. The castle was rebuilt several years later. In 1397 the Burgistein family died out and the castle was inherited by Werner Münzer. Over the following century it passed through numerous owners until 1484 when the Bernese Schultheiss Jakob von Wattenwyl acquired it. The Wattenwyl family owned the castle until 1714, when it passed to the Graffenried family. The 14th-century castle was rebuilt in the 15th and 16th centuries.

Burgistein has always been part of the parish of Thurnen, even after the village church was built in 1959.

Beginning in the 1970s the municipality began to gradually change from farming communities into bedroom communities for the nearby cities of Bern and Thun.

== Geography ==
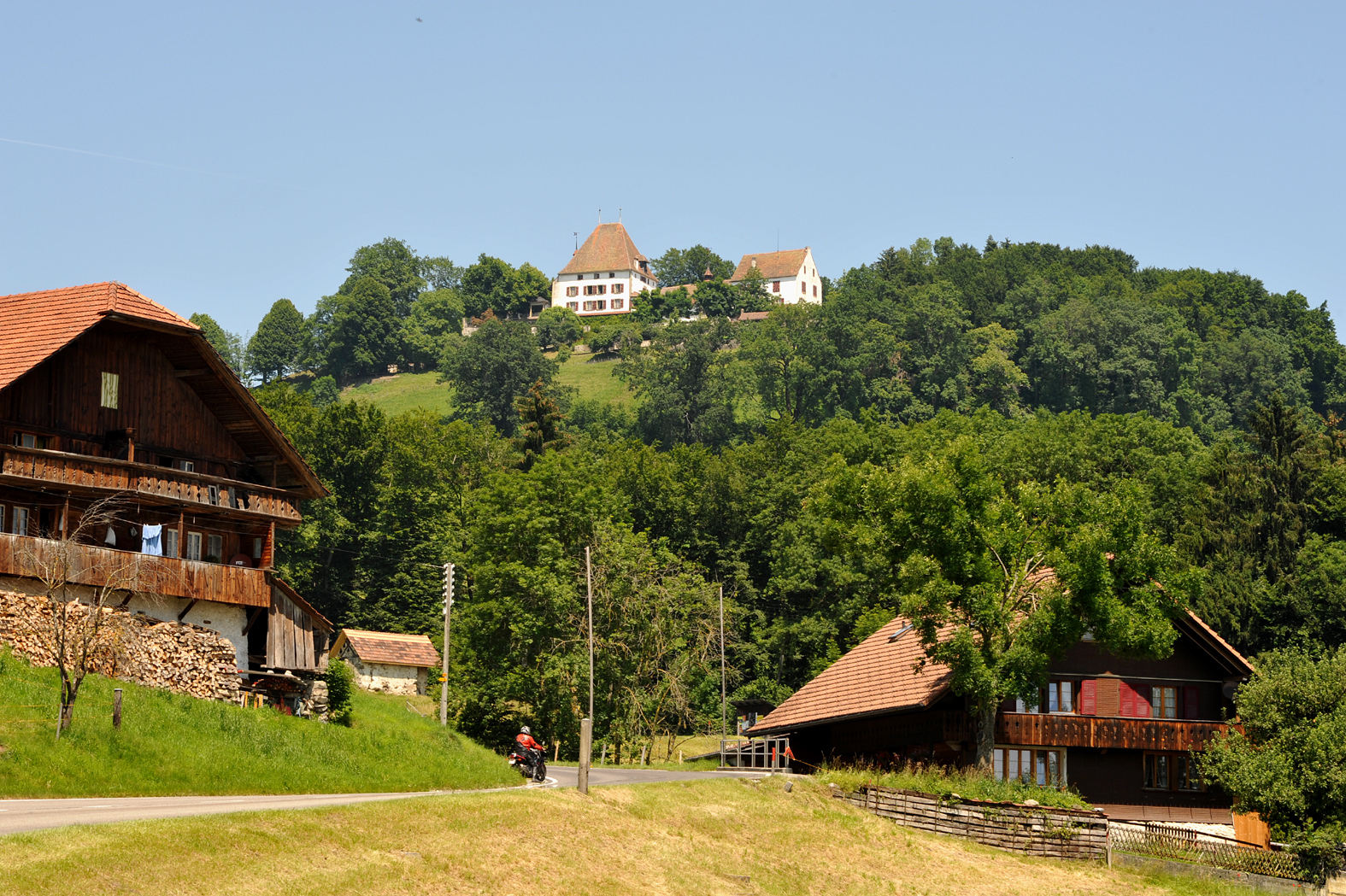
Burgistein Castle above Burgistein-Dorf

Burgistein has an area of 7.52 km^{2} (2.90 sq mi). As of 2012, a total of 5.73 km^{2} (2.21 mi^{2}) or 76.1% is used for agricultural purposes, while 0.98 km^{2} (0.38 mi^{2}) or 13.0% is forested. The rest of the municipality is 0.73 km^{2} (0.28 mi^{2}) or 9.7% is settled (buildings or roads), 0.06 km^{2} (15 acres) or 0.8% is either rivers or lakes.

During the same year, housing and buildings made up 5.6% and transportation infrastructure made up 3.5%. A total of 10.2% of the total land area is heavily forested and 2.8% is covered with orchards or small clusters of trees. Of the agricultural land, 31.7% is used for growing crops and 41.0% is pasturage, while 3.3% is used for orchards or vine crops. All the water in the municipality is flowing water.

Burgistein is a scattered settlement without a central village. The closest thing it has to a center is the old village that grew up around the former castle, Burgistein-Dorf on Längenberg-Gurnigel. The municipality includes the hamlets of Weier, Niederschönegg, Äbnit and Plötsch, as well as the new developments of Burgistein-Station (which include Grossmatt, Burgiwil, Pfandersmatt), all in the Gürbetal.

On 31 December 2009 Amtsbezirk Seftigen, the municipality's former district, was dissolved. On the following day, 1 January 2010, it joined the newly created Verwaltungskreis Thun.

== Coat of arms ==
The blazon of the municipal coat of arms is Per bend sinister Argent and Sable and in the first a Semi Deer salient issuant Gules.

== Demographics ==
Burgistein has a population (as of December 2020) of 1,093. As of 2011, 2.4% of the population are resident foreign nationals. Over the last year (2010-2011) the population has changed at a rate of -1.3%. Migration accounted for -0.9%, while births and deaths accounted for -0.6%.

Most of the population (as of 2000) speaks German (1,007 or 97.9%) as their first language, English is the second most common (5 or 0.5%) and French is the third (3 or 0.3%). There is 1 person who speaks Italian.

As of 2008, the population was 50.2% male and 49.8% female. The population was made up of 505 Swiss men (48.8% of the population) and 14 (1.4%) non-Swiss men. There were 501 Swiss women (48.5%) and 14 (1.4%) non-Swiss women. Of the population in the municipality, 365 or about 35.5% were born in Burgistein and lived there in 2000. There were 511 or 49.7% who were born in the same canton, while 78 or 7.6% were born somewhere else in Switzerland, and 49 or 4.8% were born outside of Switzerland.

As of 2011, children and teenagers (0–19 years old) make up 22.7% of the population, while adults (20–64 years old) make up 61.2% and seniors (over 64 years old) make up 16.1%.

As of 2000, there were 442 people who were single and never married in the municipality. There were 496 married individuals, 57 widows or widowers and 34 individuals who are divorced.

As of 2010, there were 102 households that consist of only one person and 30 households with five or more people. In 2000, a total of 378 apartments (89.2% of the total) were permanently occupied, while 36 apartments (8.5%) were seasonally occupied and 10 apartments (2.4%) were empty. As of 2010, the construction rate of new housing units was 3.9 new units per 1000 residents. The vacancy rate for the municipality, in 2010, was 0.85%. In 2011, single family homes made up 55.2% of the total housing in the municipality.

The historical population is given in the following chart:

== Heritage sites of national significance ==
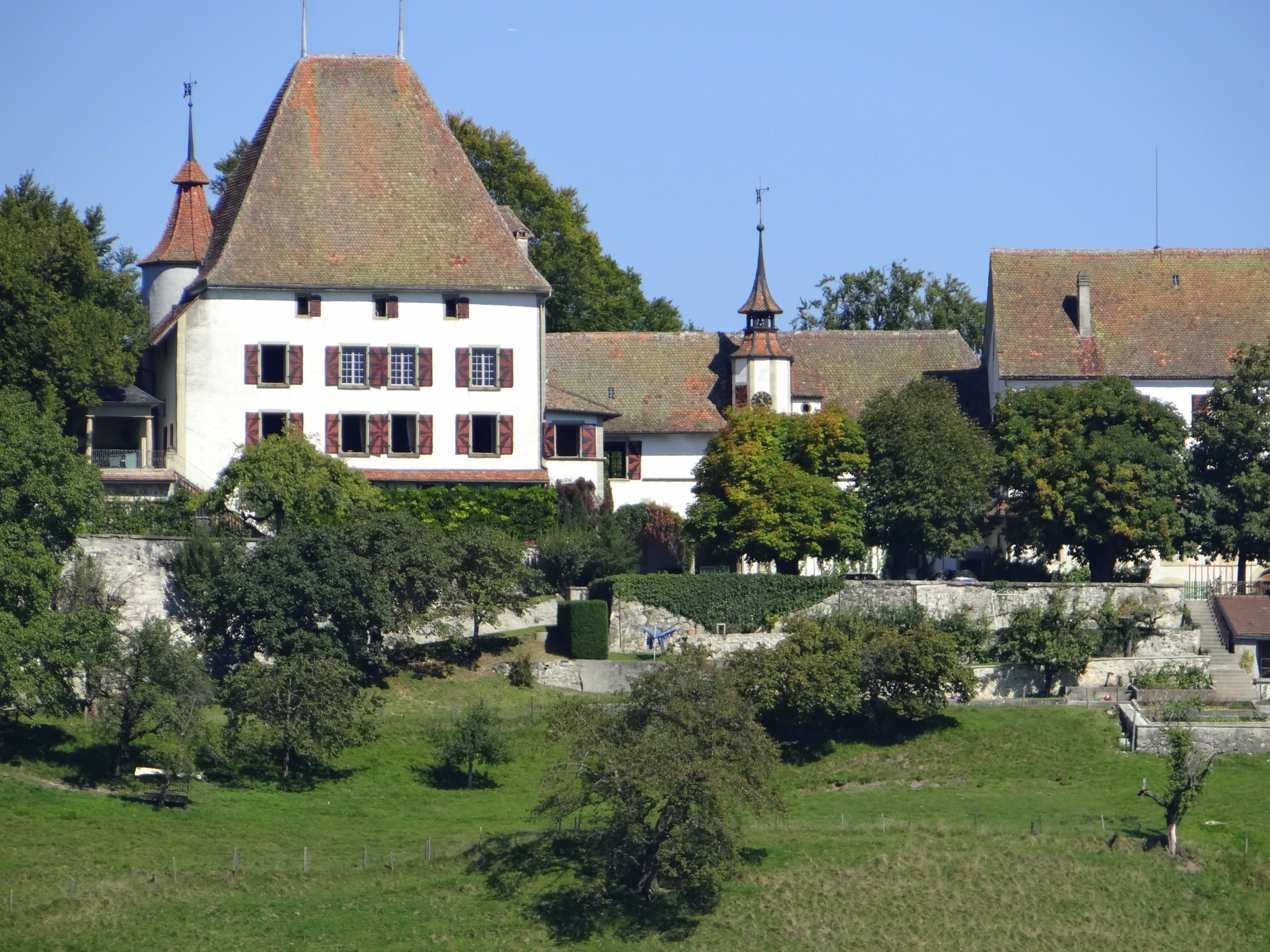
Burgistein Castle

The Castle is listed as a Swiss heritage site of national significance.

== Politics ==
In the 2011 federal election the most popular party was the Swiss People's Party (SVP) which received 39.7% of the vote. The next three most popular parties were the Social Democratic Party (SP) (19.3%), the Conservative Democratic Party (BDP) (15.1%) and the Green Party (7.3%). In the federal election, a total of 433 votes were cast, and the voter turnout was 53.1%.

== Economy ==
As of 2011, Burgistein had an unemployment rate of 1.36%. As of 2008, there were a total of 319 people employed in the municipality. Of these, there were 103 people employed in the primary economic sector and about 39 businesses involved in this sector. 118 people were employed in the secondary sector and there were 13 businesses in this sector. 98 people were employed in the tertiary sector, with 27 businesses in this sector. There were 512 residents of the municipality who were employed in some capacity, of which females made up 39.1% of the workforce.

In 2008 there were a total of 262 full-time equivalent jobs. The number of jobs in the primary sector was 66, all of which were in agriculture. The number of jobs in the secondary sector was 109 of which 64 or (58.7%) were in manufacturing and 45 (41.3%) were in construction. The number of jobs in the tertiary sector was 87. In the tertiary sector; 42 or 48.3% were in wholesale or retail sales or the repair of motor vehicles, 6 or 6.9% were in the movement and storage of goods, 16 or 18.4% were in a hotel or restaurant, 4 or 4.6% were technical professionals or scientists, 8 or 9.2% were in education.

In 2000, there were 166 workers who commuted into the municipality and 369 workers who commuted away. The municipality is a net exporter of workers, with about 2.2 workers leaving the municipality for every one entering. A total of 143 workers (46.3% of the 309 total workers in the municipality) both lived and worked in Burgistein. Of the working population, 19.1% used public transportation to get to work, and 53.7% used a private car.

In 2011 the average local and cantonal tax rate on a married resident, with two children, of Burgistein making 150,000 CHF was 12.9%, while an unmarried resident's rate was 19%. For comparison, the average rate for the entire canton in the same year, was 14.2% and 22.0%, while the nationwide average was 12.3% and 21.1% respectively.

In 2009 there were a total of 452 tax payers in the municipality. Of that total, 117 made over 75,000 CHF per year. There were 2 people who made between 15,000 and 20,000 per year. The greatest number of workers, 150, made between 50,000 and 75,000 CHF per year. The average income of the over 75,000 CHF group in Burgistein was 116,923 CHF, while the average across all of Switzerland was 130,478 CHF.

In 2011 a total of 2.3% of the population received direct financial assistance from the government.

== Religion ==
From the 2000 census, 834 or 81.0% belonged to the Swiss Reformed Church, while 64 or 6.2% were Roman Catholic. Of the rest of the population, there were 2 members of an Orthodox church (or about 0.19% of the population), there was 1 individual who belongs to the Christian Catholic Church, and there were 30 individuals (or about 2.92% of the population) who belonged to another Christian church. There were 8 (or about 0.78% of the population) who were Muslim. There was 1 person who was Buddhist. 73 (or about 7.09% of the population) belonged to no church, are agnostic or atheist, and 16 individuals (or about 1.55% of the population) did not answer the question.

== Education ==
In Burgistein about 56.7% of the population have completed non-mandatory upper secondary education, and 15.6% have completed additional higher education (either university or a Fachhochschule). Of the 95 who had completed some form of tertiary schooling listed in the census, 64.2% were Swiss men, 29.5% were Swiss women.

The Canton of Bern school system provides one year of non-obligatory Kindergarten, followed by six years of Primary school. This is followed by three years of obligatory lower Secondary school where the students are separated according to ability and aptitude. Following the lower Secondary students may attend additional schooling or they may enter an apprenticeship.

During the 2011-12 school year, there were a total of 97 students attending classes in Burgistein. There was one kindergarten class with a total of 17 students in the municipality. Of the kindergarten students, 5.9% were permanent or temporary residents of Switzerland (not citizens) and 11.8% have a different mother language than the classroom language. The municipality had 4 primary classes and 67 students. Of the primary students, 1.5% were permanent or temporary residents of Switzerland (not citizens) and 3.0% have a different mother language than the classroom language. During the same year, there was one lower secondary class with a total of 13 students. There were 7.7% who were permanent or temporary residents of Switzerland (not citizens) and 15.4% have a different mother language than the classroom language.

As of 2000, there were a total of 105 students attending any school in the municipality. Of those, 104 both lived and attended school in the municipality, while one student came from another municipality. During the same year, 49 residents attended schools outside the municipality.

== Notes ==
1 The Gesellschaft für Schweizerische Kunstgeschichte (GSK) lists these dates as 1484 and 1714, while the Historical Dictionary of Switzerland says 1493 and 1717
