= Seftigen =

- Municipality
- Flag Coat of arms
- Location of Seftigen
- Location within Switzerland Location within Canton of Bern
- Coordinates: 46°47′N 7°32′E
- Country: Switzerland
- Canton: Bern
- District: Thun

Government
  - Mayor: Leandro Manazza

Area
  - Total: 3.90 km^{2} (1.51 sq mi)
- Elevation: 578 m (1,896 ft)

Population (Dec 2012)
  - Total: 2,163
  - Density: 555/km^{2} (1,440/sq mi)
- Time zone: UTC+01:00 (CET)
  - Summer (DST): UTC+02:00 (CEST)
- Postal code: 3662
- SFOS number: 883
- ISO 3166 code: CH-BE
- Surrounded by: Burgistein, Gurzelen, Noflen, Uetendorf
- Website: www.seftigen.ch

Seftigen is a municipality in the administrative district of Thun in the canton of Bern in Switzerland.

== History ==
Seftigen is first mentioned in 1277 as Seftingen.

The oldest trace of a settlement in the area is a Roman estate house discovered in Räbzälg. The house's hypocaust and well are still visible. Following the Collapse of the Western Roman Empire, the area remained inhabited, evidenced by an early medieval cemetery at Leimeried. By the Late Middle Ages Seftigen was part of the Herrschaft of Burgistein. Around 1388 it became the capital of the Seftigen district. In the 15th century Louis von Seftigen turned the village into the center of a semi-independent court. However, the right to hold court in Seftigen was divided in half between his descendants. Eventually, Jakob von Wattenwyl reunited the two halves of the court in 1523 and incorporated it into the Burgistein Herrschaft again. From then until the 1798 French invasion the Lords of Burgistein and the von Buren family alternated presiding over the court.

Originally it was part of the Kirchdorf parish, but in 1664 it joined the much nearer Gurzelen parish.

In 1901-02 the Gürbetal railway opened up stations in Burgistein and Seftigen and began to transform the rural farming village. In the 1960s it became more of a bedroom community and the new developments of Zälg, Berg and Allmend opened up to house the growing population. Today agriculture still provides slightly less than one-quarter of the jobs in the municipality with small businesses making up the rest. However, over three-quarters of the workforce commute to jobs in nearby cities and towns.

== Geography ==
Seftigen has an area of 3.89 km^{2} (1.50 sq mi). As of 2012, a total of 2.59 km^{2} (1.00 mi^{2}) or 66.6% is used for agricultural purposes, while 0.66 km^{2} (0.25 mi^{2}) or 17.0% is forested. The rest of the municipality is 0.62 km^{2} (0.24 mi^{2}) or 15.9% is settled (buildings or roads), 0.03 km^{2} (7.4 acres) or 0.8% is either rivers or lakes.

During the same year, industrial buildings made up 2.1% of the total area while housing and buildings made up 9.0% and transportation infrastructure made up 3.9%. All of the forested land area is covered with heavy forests. Of the agricultural land, 41.1% is used for growing crops and 22.9% is pasturage, while 2.6% is used for orchards or vine crops. All the water in the municipality is flowing water.

The municipality is located in the Drumlin hill country between the Aare valley and the upper Gürbe valley. It consists of the village of Seftigen.

On 31 December 2009 Amtsbezirk Seftigen, of which it was the capital, was dissolved. On the following day, 1 January 2010, it joined the newly created Verwaltungskreis Thun.

== Coat of arms ==
The blazon of the municipal coat of arms is Per chevron embowed Gules and Argent and in chief a Rose of the last barbed and seeded proper.

== Demographics ==
Seftigen has a population (as of December 2020) of 2,147. As of 2012, 5.4% of the population are resident foreign nationals. Over the last 2 years (2010-2012) the population has changed at a rate of 1.6%. Migration accounted for 1.5%, while births and deaths accounted for 0.3%.

Most of the population (as of 2000) speaks German (2,014 or 97.0%) as their first language, Albanian is the second most common (13 or 0.6%) and Serbo-Croatian is the third (7 or 0.3%). There are 5 people who speak French and 6 people who speak Italian.

As of 2008, the population was 48.9% male and 51.1% female. The population was made up of 984 Swiss men (46.2% of the population) and 57 (2.7%) non-Swiss men. There were 1,026 Swiss women (48.2%) and 62 (2.9%) non-Swiss women. Of the population in the municipality, 554 or about 26.7% were born in Seftigen and lived there in 2000. There were 1,038 or 50.0% who were born in the same canton, while 234 or 11.3% were born somewhere else in Switzerland, and 153 or 7.4% were born outside of Switzerland.

As of 2012, children and teenagers (0–19 years old) make up 20.1% of the population, while adults (20–64 years old) make up 64.0% and seniors (over 64 years old) make up 15.9%.

As of 2000, there were 820 people who were single and never married in the municipality. There were 1,050 married individuals, 122 widows or widowers and 84 individuals who are divorced.

As of 2010, there were 255 households that consist of only one person and 46 households with five or more people. In 2000, a total of 811 apartments (93.9% of the total) were permanently occupied, while 34 apartments (3.9%) were seasonally occupied and 19 apartments (2.2%) were empty. As of 2012, the construction rate of new housing units was 0.5 new units per 1000 residents. The vacancy rate for the municipality, in 2013, was 1.3%. In 2011, single family homes made up 53.3% of the total housing in the municipality.

The historical population is given in the following chart:

== Politics ==
In the 2011 federal election the most popular party was the Swiss People's Party (SVP) which received 33.9% of the vote. The next three most popular parties were the Conservative Democratic Party (BDP) (18.3%), the Social Democratic Party (SP) (15.5%) and the Evangelical People's Party (EVP) (6.7%). In the federal election, a total of 866 votes were cast, and the voter turnout was 51.9%.

== Economy ==
As of 2011, Seftigen had an unemployment rate of 1.27%. As of 2011, there were a total of 592 people employed in the municipality. Of these, there were 47 people employed in the primary economic sector and about 17 businesses involved in this sector. 210 people were employed in the secondary sector and there were 30 businesses in this sector. 335 people were employed in the tertiary sector, with 103 businesses in this sector. There were 1,124 residents of the municipality who were employed in some capacity, of which females made up 41.7% of the workforce.

In 2008 there were a total of 353 full-time equivalent jobs. The number of jobs in the primary sector was 30, all of which were in agriculture. The number of jobs in the secondary sector was 144 of which 78 or (54.2%) were in manufacturing and 67 (46.5%) were in construction. The number of jobs in the tertiary sector was 179. In the tertiary sector; 67 or 37.4% were in wholesale or retail sales or the repair of motor vehicles, 9 or 5.0% were in the movement and storage of goods, 14 or 7.8% were in a hotel or restaurant, 2 or 1.1% were the insurance or financial industry, 9 or 5.0% were technical professionals or scientists, 20 or 11.2% were in education and 40 or 22.3% were in health care.

In 2000, there were 222 workers who commuted into the municipality and 863 workers who commuted away. The municipality is a net exporter of workers, with about 3.9 workers leaving the municipality for every one entering. A total of 261 workers (54.0% of the 483 total workers in the municipality) both lived and worked in Seftigen. Of the working population, 28.3% used public transportation to get to work, and 48.9% used a private car.

In 2011 the average local and cantonal tax rate on a married resident, with two children, of Seftigen making 150,000 CHF was 12.8%, while an unmarried resident's rate was 18.8%. For comparison, the average rate for the entire canton in the same year, was 14.2% and 22.0%, while the nationwide average was 12.3% and 21.1% respectively.

In 2009 there were a total of 992 tax payers in the municipality. Of that total, 315 made over 75,000 CHF per year. There were 7 people who made between 15,000 and 20,000 per year. The average income of the over 75,000 CHF group in Seftigen was 118,189 CHF, while the average across all of Switzerland was 130,478 CHF.

In 2011 a total of 2.3% of the population received direct financial assistance from the government.

== Religion ==
From the 2000 census, 1,635 or 78.8% belonged to the Swiss Reformed Church, while 118 or 5.7% were Roman Catholic. Of the rest of the population, there were 17 members of an Orthodox church (or about 0.82% of the population), there was 1 individual who belongs to the Christian Catholic Church, and there were 52 individuals (or about 2.50% of the population) who belonged to another Christian church. There were 42 (or about 2.02% of the population) who were Muslim. There were 5 individuals who were Buddhist, 14 individuals who were Hindu and 2 individuals who belonged to another church. 129 (or about 6.21% of the population) belonged to no church, are agnostic or atheist, and 61 individuals (or about 2.94% of the population) did not answer the question.

== Education ==
In Seftigen about 61.8% of the population have completed non-mandatory upper secondary education, and 16.7% have completed additional higher education (either university or a Fachhochschule). Of the 214 who had completed some form of tertiary schooling listed in the census, 74.3% were Swiss men, 19.2% were Swiss women, 3.7% were non-Swiss men and 2.8% were non-Swiss women.

The Canton of Bern school system provides one year of non-obligatory Kindergarten, followed by six years of Primary school. This is followed by three years of obligatory lower Secondary school where the students are separated according to ability and aptitude. Following the lower Secondary students may attend additional schooling or they may enter an apprenticeship.

During the 2011-12 school year, there were a total of 196 students attending classes in Seftigen. There were 2 kindergarten classes with a total of 48 students in the municipality. Of the kindergarten students, 12.5% were permanent or temporary residents of Switzerland (not citizens) and 10.4% have a different mother language than the classroom language. The municipality had 7 primary classes and 121 students. Of the primary students, 5.8% were permanent or temporary residents of Switzerland (not citizens) and 11.6% have a different mother language than the classroom language. During the same year, there were 2 lower secondary classes with a total of 27 students. There were 18.5% who were permanent or temporary residents of Switzerland (not citizens) and 22.2% have a different mother language than the classroom language.

As of 2000, there were a total of 193 students attending any school in the municipality. Of those, 191 both lived and attended school in the municipality, while 2 students came from another municipality. During the same year, 114 residents attended schools outside the municipality.

Seftigen is home to the Schul- und Volksbibliothek Seftigen library. The library has (as of 2008) 3,000 books or other media, and loaned out 4,531 items in the same year. It was open a total of 99 days with an average of 4 hours per week during that year.
