= Forst, Switzerland =

Forst
- Former municipality
- Flag Coat of arms
- Location of Forst
- Location within Switzerland Location within Canton of Bern
- Coordinates: 46°45′N 7°31′E
- Country: Switzerland
- Canton: Bern
- District: Thun

Area
  - Total: 1.8 km^{2} (0.69 sq mi)
- Elevation: 652 m (2,139 ft)

Population (2005)
  - Total: 357
  - Density: 200/km^{2} (510/sq mi)
- Time zone: UTC+01:00 (CET)
  - Summer (DST): UTC+02:00 (CEST)
- Postal code: 3636
- SFOS number: 926
- ISO 3166 code: CH-BE
- Website: www.forst.ch

Forst (Swiss Standard German pronunciation: [fɔrst]) is a village in the canton of Bern, Switzerland. The former municipality of the district of Thun merged with Längenbühl on January 1, 2007 to form Forst-Längenbühl.

== Geography ==
Forst is a settlement with scattered building in the moraine landscape of Upper Gürbetal. The most important boroughs are Dörfli, Allmid (Allmend), Chromen, Längmoos, and Riedhubel. Of the entire municipal territory of 185 hectares, 79.7% is used for agriculture, 11.8% is forested, and a mere 8% is used for settlements.

== Notable people ==
- Ernst Hadorn (1902–1976), pioneer of developmental genetics, was born in Forst

== Politics ==
The Municipal President of Forst is Hans Burkhalter.

== Transportation ==
Forst is connected to the public transportation grid via Bus Line 51 Thun-Forst-Blumenstein of Verkehrsbetriebe STI.
