= Geistsee =

Lake in Switzerland

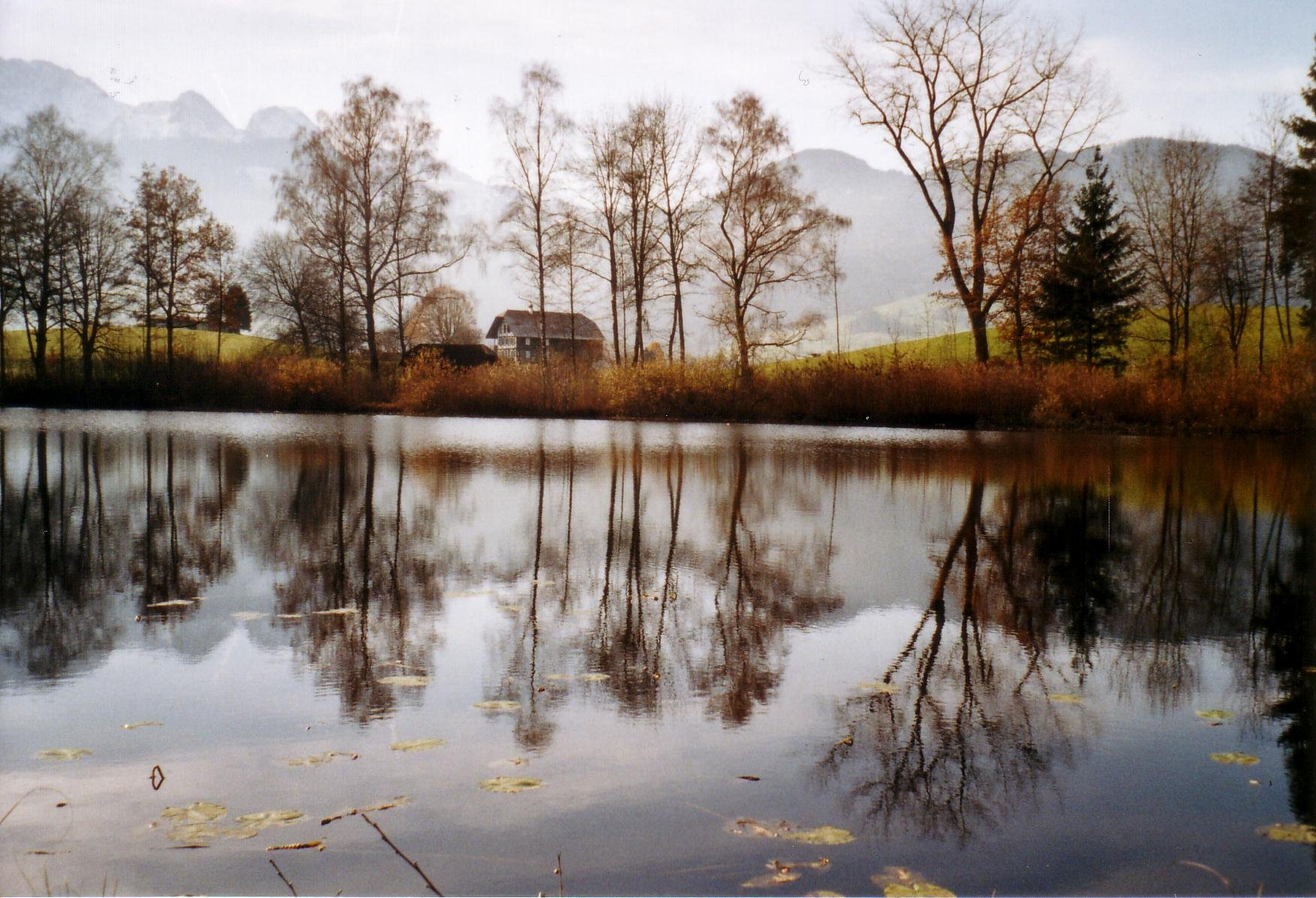

- Location within Canton of Bern Location within Switzerland Location within Alps
- Interactive map of Geistsee
- Location: Längenbühl, Canton of Bern
- Coordinates: 46°45′41″N 7°32′4″E
- Basin countries: Switzerland
- Surface area: 0.95 ha (2.3 acres)
- Surface elevation: 660 m (2,170 ft)

Geistsee is a lake at Längenbühl in the canton of Bern, Switzerland. Its surface area is 0.95 ha (2.3 acres). The lake is private property and not accessible by the public.
