= Längenbühl =

- Former municipality
- Flag Coat of arms
- Location of Längenbühl
- Location within Switzerland Location within Canton of Bern
- Coordinates: 46°45′N 7°32′E
- Country: Switzerland
- Canton: Bern
- District: Thun

Area
  - Total: 2.65 km^{2} (1.02 sq mi)
- Elevation: 654 m (2,146 ft)

Population (January 2005)
  - Total: 363
  - Density: 137/km^{2} (355/sq mi)
- Time zone: UTC+01:00 (CET)
  - Summer (DST): UTC+02:00 (CEST)
- Postal code: 3636
- SFOS number: 933
- ISO 3166 code: CH-BE
- Website: www.laengenbuehl.ch

Längenbühl is a village in the canton of Bern, Switzerland. The former municipality of the district of Thun merged with Forst on January 1, 2007 to form Forst-Längenbühl.

There are three smaller lakes in Längenbühl: Dittligsee, Geistsee and a smaller pond.
