= Gürbetal =

Valley in Switzerland

Coordinates: 46°50′10″N 7°30′23″E

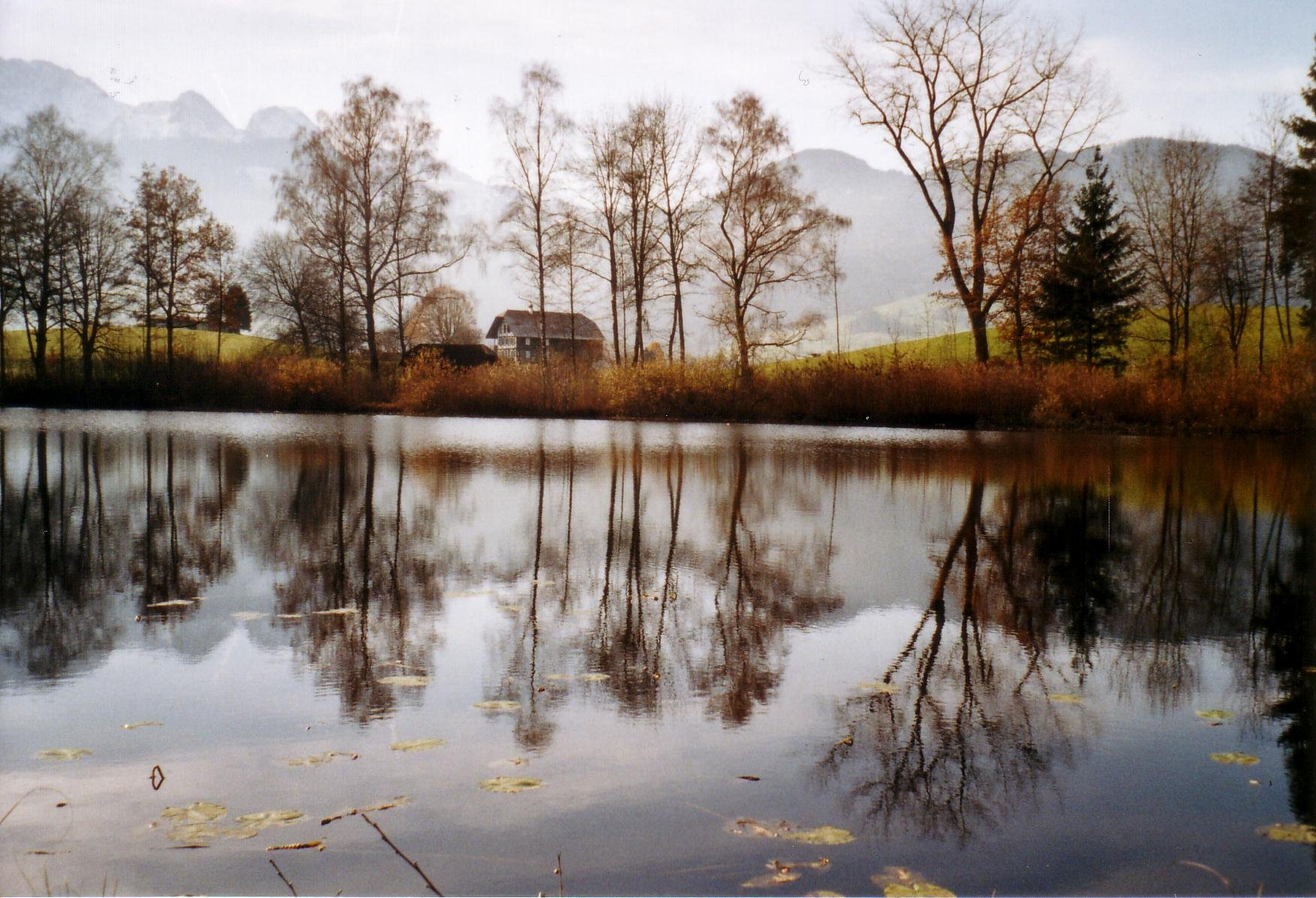
Geistsee in Gürbetal

Gürbetal (Gürbe Valley) in Switzerland lies between the towns of Bern and Thun, west of the Aare. It contains the municipality of Seftigen and those that surround it. The valley is named after the river Gürbe, which flows through it. The largest town in the Gürbe Valley is Belp. The Gürbe valley and the Aare valley are separated by the Belpberg hill.

The Gürbe Valley is anywhere from 1 to 2 kilometers wide. The valley floor is flat and is used intensively for agriculture. Flooding in the valley has been controlled by canals to permit drainage of the surrounding area. This permits orchards and vegetable gardens to grow. Cabbage is the principal crop grown on the rich black valley floor. Sauerkraut from the cabbage is made at processing centers in Burgistein and Mühlethurnen. For this reason, the Gürbe valley is often called "Cabbage Land" (in Swiss-German: Chabisland).
