= Uttigen =

- Municipality
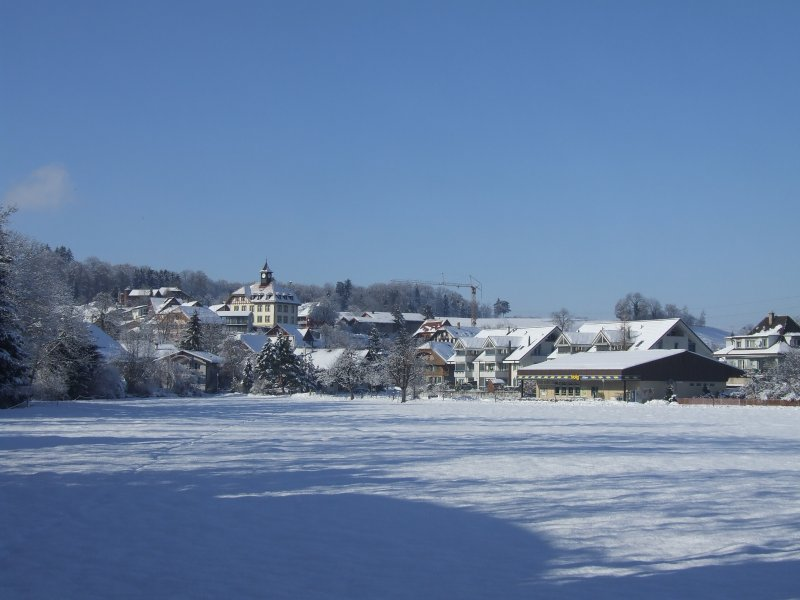

- Flag Coat of arms
- Location of Uttigen
- Location within Switzerland Location within Canton of Bern
- Coordinates: 46°48′N 7°34′E
- Country: Switzerland
- Canton: Bern
- District: Thun

Government
  - Mayor: Andreas Epprecht

Area
  - Total: 3.06 km^{2} (1.18 sq mi)
- Elevation: 544 m (1,785 ft)

Population (Dec 2012)
  - Total: 1,847
  - Density: 604/km^{2} (1,560/sq mi)
- Time zone: UTC+01:00 (CET)
  - Summer (DST): UTC+02:00 (CEST)
- Postal code: 3628
- SFOS number: 885
- ISO 3166 code: CH-BE
- Surrounded by: Heimberg, Jaberg, Kiesen, Kirchdorf, Uetendorf
- Website: www.uttigen.ch

Uttigen is a municipality in the administrative district of Thun in the canton of Bern in Switzerland. On 1 January 2014 the former municipality of Kienersrüti merged into the municipality of Uttigen.

== History ==
Aerial view (1952)

Uttigen was first mentioned in 894 as Utingun.

=== Uttigen ===
The oldest traces of a settlement in the area include a grave mound that can not be accurately dated and what is probably a Roman era villa. Several graves from the Early Middle Ages have also been found.

By the 13th century Uttigen Castle had been built on a rocky plateau above the modern village. The large square keep was surrounded by a town and a high curtain wall. At the time, Uttigen Castle was one of the largest fortifications in the Canton of Bern. Uttigen Castle controlled both a major road and a navigable river that connected the Bernese Oberland with the towns of the Swiss Plateau. In 1271 the Freiherr von Wädenswil owned the castle, along with expansive holdings as the governors of Unspunnen, Frutigen and Mülinen. In 1285 the castle church was mentioned in the Strättliger Chronicle as one of the twelve churches surrounding Lake Thun. In the 14th century the von Wädenswil family died out and the Freiherr von Kramburg inherited Uttigen Castle and village. They held it briefly and then passed it on to Heinrich von Resti in 1355. In the 15th century the Castle, village and lands were divided into two shares and the von Speichingen of Thun and Michel von Schwertschwendi in Burgdorf each owned half. The two half shares were gradually purchased by or given as gifts to the Hospital in Thun between 1476 and 1521. In 1521 the Hospital combined both halves of Uttigen with Uetendorf to form a single court. Following the 1798 French invasion and the creation of the Helvetic Republic the Hospital lost their rulership over Uttigen. With the collapse of the Republic and the 1803 Act of Mediation the village became part of the District of Seftigen. Uttigen Castle was abandoned and left to decay.

The village church was destroyed in a fire in 1536 and not rebuilt. After the fire, Uttigen became part of the parish of Kirchdorf, though the villagers fought the change until 1579 when they were granted a cemetery.

In 1859 the Bern-Thun Railway opened a station in Uttigen, connecting the small farming village with nearby cities. The Aare and Zulg river correction projects of the 1860s and 1884 respectively, opened up new farm land and protected the village from floods. The village began to slowly grow. The growth accelerated in the 1970s when on-ramps to the A6 motorway were built near Uttigen. By the 21st century it was part of the agglomeration of Thun. In 2005, agriculture provided only 12% of jobs in the municipality, while industry and commerce provided 45%. A primary school and a Realschule were in built in the municipality, while secondary students attend the school in Uetendorf.

=== Kienersrüti ===
Very little is known about the early history of Kienersrüti. It was a small farming community that probably grew out of the nearby village of Noflen or other small farming communities. After Bern adopted the new faith of the Protestant Reformation, it was probably combined with neighboring villages into the court of Gelterfingen or Mühledorf in the Seftigen District. It was part of the parish of Kirchdorf. Despite generally having a population of less than 100, it was an independent municipality from the 18th century until 2014. Today it is still a small farming community and about two-thirds of the work force commutes to jobs in nearby towns and cities.

== Geography ==
After the merger Uttigen has an area of 3.81 km^{2} (1.47 sq mi). Before the merger Uttigen had an area of 3 km^{2} (1.2 sq mi). As of 2012, a total of 1.41 km^{2} (0.54 mi^{2}) or 46.2% is used for agricultural purposes, while 0.99 km^{2} (0.38 mi^{2}) or 32.5% is forested. The rest of the municipality is 0.55 km^{2} (0.21 mi^{2}) or 18.0% is settled (buildings or roads), 0.06 km^{2} (15 acres) or 2.0% is either rivers or lakes.

During the same year, industrial buildings made up 2.0% of the total area while housing and buildings made up 10.2% and transportation infrastructure made up 4.3%. All of the forested land area is covered with heavy forests. Of the agricultural land, 30.5% is used for growing crops and 14.4% is pasturage, while 1.3% is used for orchards or vine crops. All the water in the municipality is flowing water.

On 31 December 2009 Amtsbezirk Seftigen, the municipality's former district, was dissolved. On the following day, 1 January 2010, it joined the newly created Verwaltungskreis Thun.

== Coat of arms ==
The blazon of the municipal coat of arms is Azure an Oar and a Pike both Or in slatire.

== Demographics ==
Uttigen has a population (as of December 2020) of 2,153. As of 2011, 4.8% of the population are resident foreign nationals. Over the last year (2010–2011) the population has changed at a rate of 2.3%. Migration accounted for 1.6%, while births and deaths accounted for 0.6%.

Most of the population (as of 2000) speaks German (1,514 or 96.2%) as their first language, French is the second most common (11 or 0.7%) and English is the third (10 or 0.6%). There are 7 people who speak Italian.

As of 2008, the population was 48.9% male and 51.1% female. The population was made up of 837 Swiss men (46.4% of the population) and 46 (2.5%) non-Swiss men. There were 888 Swiss women (49.2%) and 33 (1.8%) non-Swiss women. Of the population in the municipality, 392 or about 24.9% were born in Uttigen and lived there in 2000. There were 880 or 55.9% who were born in the same canton, while 166 or 10.5% were born somewhere else in Switzerland, and 89 or 5.7% were born outside of Switzerland.

As of 2011, children and teenagers (0–19 years old) make up 23.9% of the population, while adults (20–64 years old) make up 61.9% and seniors (over 64 years old) make up 14.2%.

As of 2000, there were 672 people who were single and never married in the municipality. There were 750 married individuals, 77 widows or widowers and 75 individuals who are divorced.

As of 2010, there were 204 households that consist of only one person and 49 households with five or more people. In 2000, a total of 600 apartments (92.4% of the total) were permanently occupied, while 26 apartments (4.0%) were seasonally occupied and 23 apartments (3.5%) were empty. As of 2010, the construction rate of new housing units was 3.9 new units per 1000 residents. The vacancy rate for the municipality, in 2010, was 0.25%. In 2011, single family homes made up 62.2% of the total housing in the municipality.

== Historic population ==
The historical population is given in the following chart:

== Politics ==
In the 2011 federal election the most popular party was the Swiss People's Party (SVP) which received 32.8% of the vote. The next three most popular parties were the Social Democratic Party (SP) (15.9%), the Conservative Democratic Party (BDP) (15.7%) and the Green Party (9.2%). In the federal election, a total of 834 votes were cast, and the voter turnout was 59.3%.

== Economy ==
As of 2011, Uttigen had an unemployment rate of 1.09%. As of 2008, there were a total of 258 people employed in the municipality. Of these, there were 23 people employed in the primary economic sector and about 7 businesses involved in this sector. 124 people were employed in the secondary sector and there were 25 businesses in this sector. 111 people were employed in the tertiary sector, with 31 businesses in this sector. There were 900 residents of the municipality who were employed in some capacity, of which females made up 42.8% of the workforce.

In 2008 there were a total of 206 full-time equivalent jobs. The number of jobs in the primary sector was 16, all of which were in agriculture. The number of jobs in the secondary sector was 108 of which 10 or (9.3%) were in manufacturing, 22 or (20.4%) were in mining and 63 (58.3%) were in construction. The number of jobs in the tertiary sector was 82. In the tertiary sector; 26 or 31.7% were in wholesale or retail sales or the repair of motor vehicles, 4 or 4.9% were in the movement and storage of goods, 1 was in a hotel or restaurant, 2 or 2.4% were in the information industry, 4 or 4.9% were technical professionals or scientists, 13 or 15.9% were in education and 3 or 3.7% were in health care.

In 2000, there were 113 workers who commuted into the municipality and 698 workers who commuted away. The municipality is a net exporter of workers, with about 6.2 workers leaving the municipality for every one entering. A total of 202 workers (64.1% of the 315 total workers in the municipality) both lived and worked in Uttigen. Of the working population, 25.8% used public transportation to get to work, and 51.2% used a private car.

In 2011 the average local and cantonal tax rate on a married resident, with two children, of Uttigen making 150,000 CHF was 12.1%, while an unmarried resident's rate was 17.8%. For comparison, the average rate for the entire canton in the same year, was 14.2% and 22.0%, while the nationwide average was 12.3% and 21.1% respectively.

In 2009 there were a total of 753 tax payers in the municipality. Of that total, 292 made over 75,000 CHF per year. There were 4 people who made between 15,000 and 20,000 per year. The average income of the over 75,000 CHF group in Uttigen was 113,867 CHF, while the average across all of Switzerland was 130,478 CHF.

In 2011 a total of 1.8% of the population received direct financial assistance from the government.

== Religion ==
From the 2000 census, 1,205 or 76.6% belonged to the Swiss Reformed Church, while 125 or 7.9% were Roman Catholic. Of the rest of the population, there were 9 members of an Orthodox church (or about 0.57% of the population), there were 2 individuals (or about 0.13% of the population) who belonged to the Christian Catholic Church, and there were 99 individuals (or about 6.29% of the population) who belonged to another Christian church. There were 2 (or about 0.13% of the population) who were Muslim. There were 3 individuals who were Buddhist, 8 individuals who were Hindu and 2 individuals who belonged to another church. 74 (or about 4.70% of the population) belonged to no church, are agnostic or atheist, and 45 individuals (or about 2.86% of the population) did not answer the question.

== Education ==
In Uttigen about 62.6% of the population have completed non-mandatory upper secondary education, and 17.5% have completed additional higher education (either university or a Fachhochschule). Of the 177 who had completed some form of tertiary schooling listed in the census, 83.1% were Swiss men, 13.0% were Swiss women.

The Canton of Bern school system provides one year of non-obligatory Kindergarten, followed by six years of Primary school. This is followed by three years of obligatory lower Secondary school where the students are separated according to ability and aptitude. Following the lower Secondary students may attend additional schooling or they may enter an apprenticeship.

During the 2011–12 school year, there were a total of 219 students attending classes in Uttigen. There were 2 kindergarten classes with a total of 39 students in the municipality. Of the kindergarten students, 10.3% were permanent or temporary residents of Switzerland (not citizens) and 12.8% have a different mother language than the classroom language. The municipality had 8 primary classes and 151 students. Of the primary students, 2.6% were permanent or temporary residents of Switzerland (not citizens) and 4.6% have a different mother language than the classroom language. During the same year, there were 2 lower secondary classes with a total of 29 students.

As of 2000, there were a total of 155 students attending any school in the municipality. Of those, 154 both lived and attended school in the municipality, while one student came from another municipality. During the same year, 76 residents attended schools outside the municipality.

== Notable people ==
- Christine von Wattenwyl (1888–1964), Swiss religious worker
