= Mühledorf =

There are communes that have the name Mühledorf in Switzerland:

- Mühledorf, Bern, in the Canton of Bern
- Mühledorf, Solothurn, in the Canton of Solothurn
