= Kirchdorf, Bern =

Kirchdorf
- Municipality
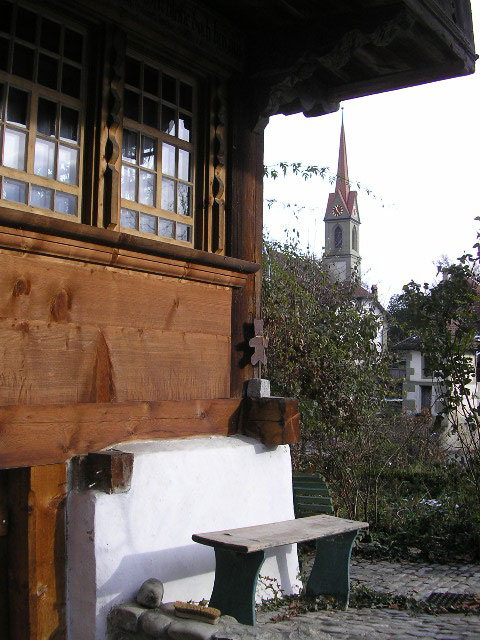
- Richly decorated farm house and village church in Kirchdorf village

- Flag Coat of arms
- Location of Kirchdorf
- Location within Switzerland Location within Canton of Bern
- Coordinates: 46°49′N 7°33′E
- Country: Switzerland
- Canton: Bern
- District: Bern-Mittelland

Government
  - Executive: Gemeinderat with 7 members
  - Mayor: Gemeindepräsident; Marco Lehmann (as of 2026)

Area
  - Total: 6.1 km^{2} (2.4 sq mi)
- Elevation: 611 m (2,005 ft)

Population (December 2020)
  - Total: 1,796
  - Density: 290/km^{2} (760/sq mi)
- Time zone: UTC+01:00 (CET)
  - Summer (DST): UTC+02:00 (CEST)
- Postal code: 3116
- SFOS number: 0872
- ISO 3166 code: CH-BE
- Surrounded by: Burgistein, Gerzensee, Jaberg, Kienersrüti, Lohnstorf, Mühledorf, Mühlethurnen, Noflen, Uttigen, Wichtrach
- Website: www.kirchdorf-be.ch

Kirchdorf is a municipality in the Bern-Mittelland administrative district in the canton of Bern in Switzerland. On 1 January 2018 the former municipalities of Gelterfingen, Mühledorf and Noflen merged into the municipality of Kirchdorf.

== History ==
Aerial view (1952)

Kirchdorf is first mentioned in 1228 as Chilthorf.

The oldest trace of a settlement in the area are several La Tène graves near the current cemetery. A prehistoric earthwork in the Gestelenwald may have had a village near it. During the Middle Ages a number of local nobles and patricians owned rights or land in the village. From the 13th until the 15th century several monasteries bought or received much of the village. In 1507-08 Jakob von Wattenwyl acquired all the scattered rights and land holdings and combined them into a single Herrschaft. He then sold the territory and Kirchdorf passed through a number of owners. In 1645, the village council acquired the Kirchdorf court, which they then sold to Bern for 1,000 pounds.

The village church of St. Ursus was built during the Middle Ages. It first appears in a historical record in 1228 as the center of a large parish. Today it is still the parish church for several surrounding municipalities. The current church was built in 1872-74, after the medieval church was destroyed in a fire.

The village is located between the Emmental and Schwarzburg regions and has always made a little money off the trade route. Beginning in the 1970s the population began increasing as commuters moved into Kirchdorf. Today, about two-thirds of the workers commute to jobs in other towns and cities. The local economy is based on agriculture, small businesses, gravel mining and a regional landfill. The Tannacker home and workshop for the handicapped also provides some jobs.

== Geography ==
Kirchdorf has an area of 6.12 km^{2} (2.36 sq mi). As of 2012, a total of 4.16 km^{2} (1.61 mi^{2}) or 67.9% is used for agricultural purposes, while 1.09 km^{2} (0.42 mi^{2}) or 17.8% is forested. The rest of the municipality is 0.7 km^{2} (0.27 mi^{2}) or 11.4% is settled (buildings or roads), 0.11 km^{2} (27 acres) or 1.8% is either rivers or lakes and 0.04 km^{2} (9.9 acres) or 0.7% is unproductive land.

During the same year, housing and buildings made up 3.9% and transportation infrastructure made up 2.6%. Power and water infrastructure as well as other special developed areas made up 4.9% of the area All of the forested land area is covered with heavy forests. Of the agricultural land, 41.3% is used for growing crops and 22.3% is pasturage, while 4.2% is used for orchards or vine crops. Of the water in the municipality, 1.5% is in lakes and 0.3% is in rivers and streams.

The municipality includes the village of Kirchdorf together with other hamlets and individual houses. It is located on a terrace between the Aare valley and the Gürbetal (Gürbe valley), it also is bordered by Gerzensee Lake. The parish of Kirchdorf includes Gelterfingen, Jaberg, Kienersrüti, Mühledorf, Noflen and Uttigen.

The municipalities of Gelterfingen, Gerzensee, Kirchdorf (BE), Mühledorf and Noflen are considering a merger on 1 January 2017 into the new municipality with an, as of 2014, undetermined name.

On 31 December 2009 Amtsbezirk Seftigen, the municipality's former district, was dissolved. On the following day, 1 January 2010, it joined the newly created Verwaltungskreis Bern-Mittelland.

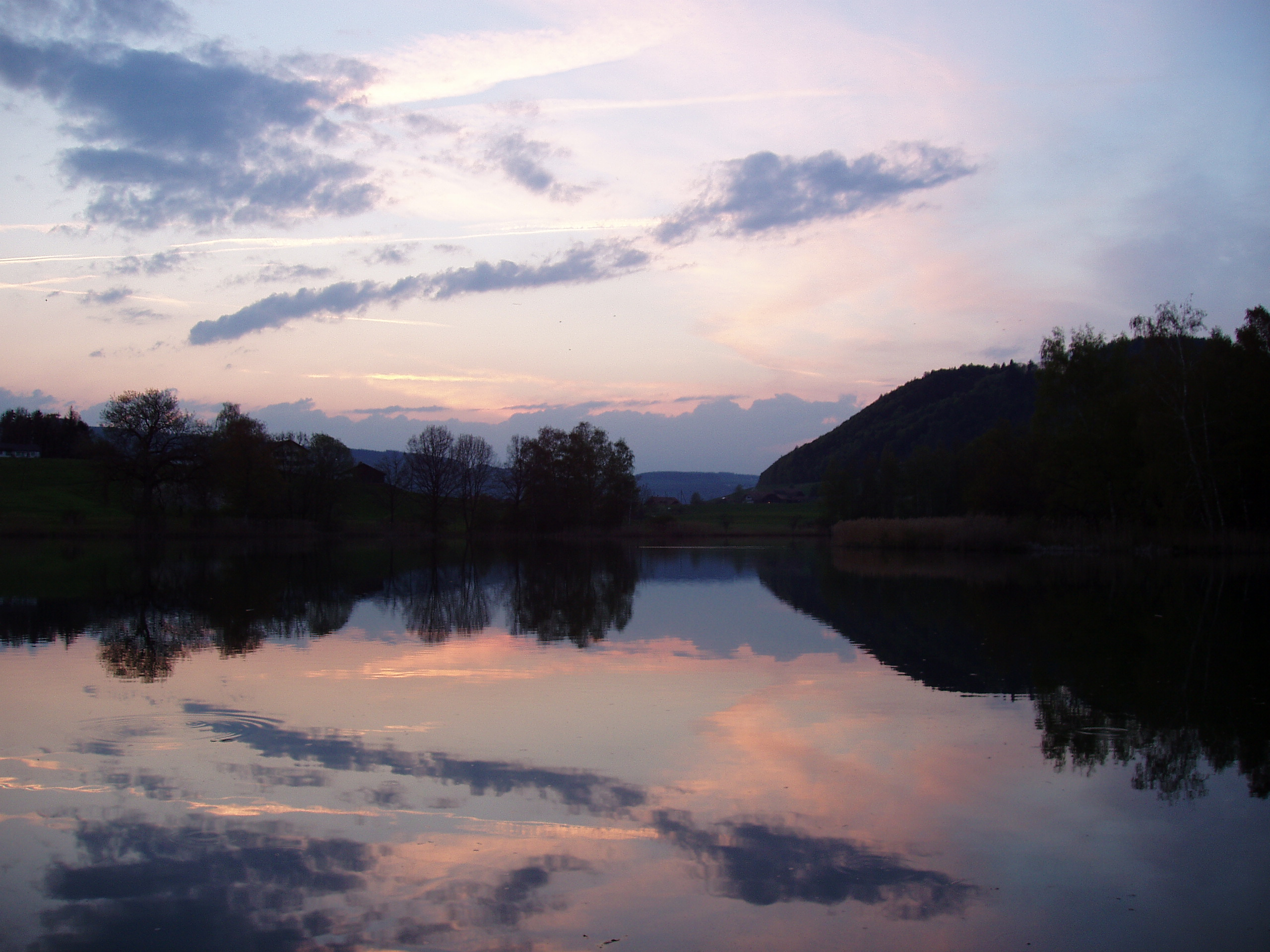
The lake "Gerzensee", seen from Kirchdorf.

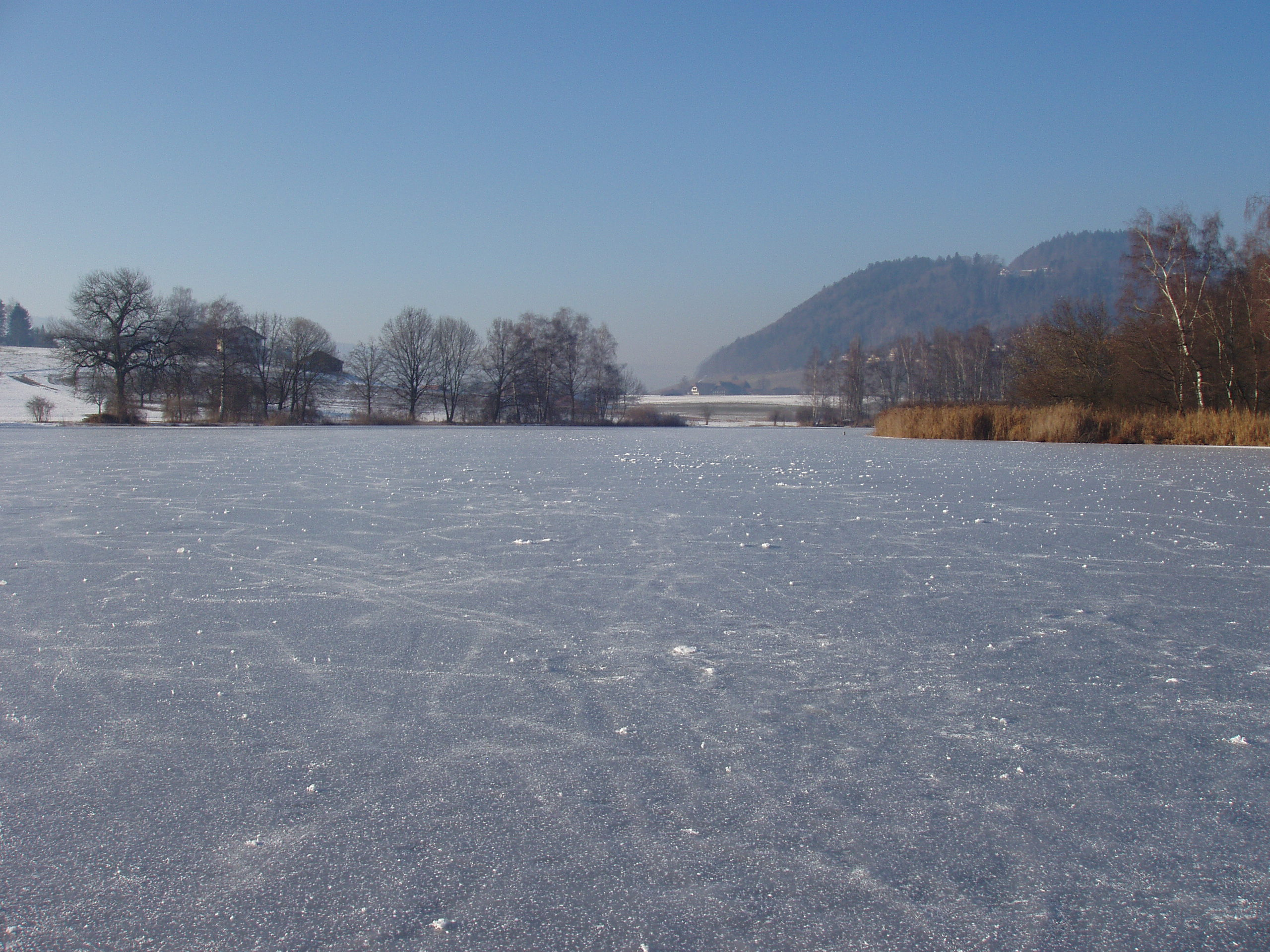
The lake in winter.

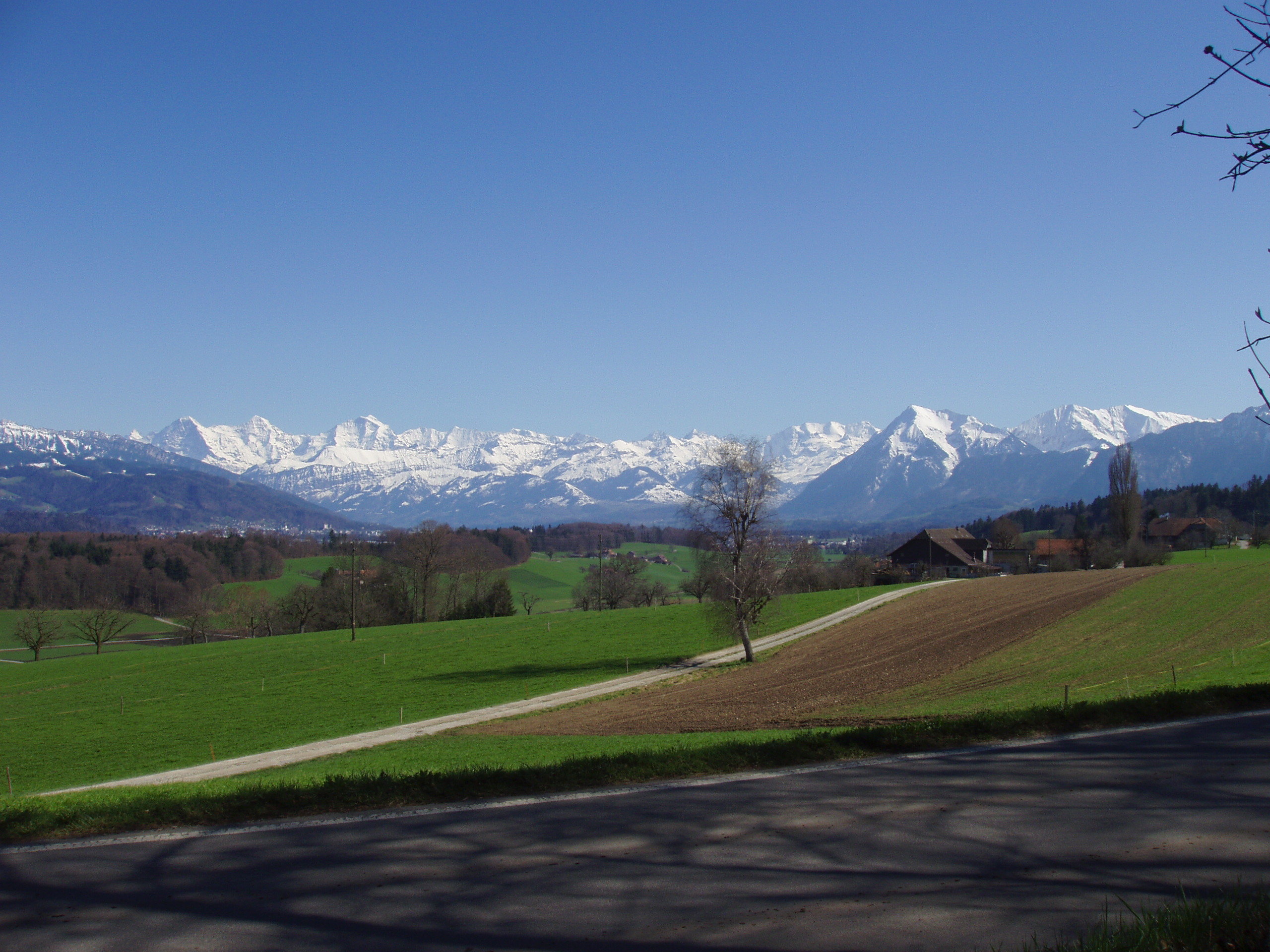
Great view from Kirchdorf: Alps of the Bernese Oberland.

== Coat of arms ==
The blazon of the municipal coat of arms is Gules a Butcher Axe Argent and on the Flanks of the last two Oxen Heads Sable horned, ringed and langued of the first.

== Demographics ==
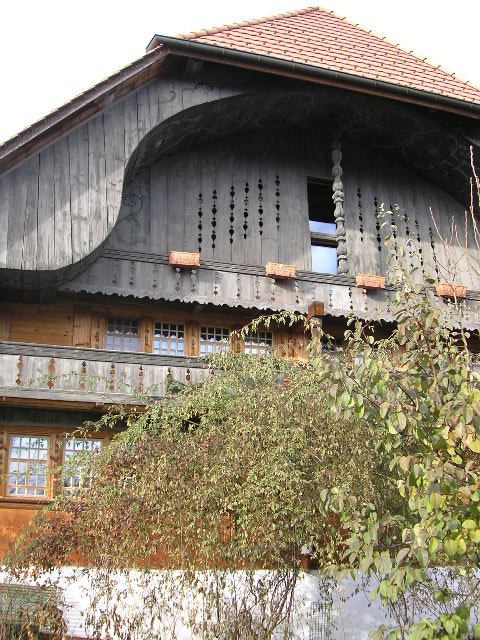
The Lehnerhaus farmhouse in Kirchdorf

Kirchdorf has a population (as of December 2020) of 1,796. As of 2012, 3.7% of the population are resident foreign nationals. Over the last 2 years (2010-2012) the population has changed at a rate of 8.2%. Migration accounted for 7.0%, while births and deaths accounted for 0.0%.

Most of the population (as of 2000) speaks German (792 or 96.7%) as their first language, French is the second most common (10 or 1.2%) and Romansh is the third (3 or 0.4%). There are 2 people who speak Italian.

As of 2008, the population was 49.4% male and 50.6% female. The population was made up of 385 Swiss men (47.3% of the population) and 17 (2.1%) non-Swiss men. There were 401 Swiss women (49.3%) and 11 (1.4%) non-Swiss women. Of the population in the municipality, 270 or about 33.0% were born in Kirchdorf and lived there in 2000. There were 408 or 49.8% who were born in the same canton, while 80 or 9.8% were born somewhere else in Switzerland, and 49 or 6.0% were born outside of Switzerland.

As of 2012, children and teenagers (0–19 years old) make up 23.5% of the population, while adults (20–64 years old) make up 60.5% and seniors (over 64 years old) make up 16.0%.

As of 2000, there were 346 people who were single and never married in the municipality. There were 396 married individuals, 44 widows or widowers and 33 individuals who are divorced.

As of 2010, there were 96 households that consist of only one person and 28 households with five or more people. In 2000, a total of 308 apartments (93.3% of the total) were permanently occupied, while 13 apartments (3.9%) were seasonally occupied and 9 apartments (2.7%) were empty. As of 2012, the construction rate of new housing units was 14.7559591373 new units per 1000 residents. The vacancy rate for the municipality, in 2013, was 1.0075566751%. In 2011, single family homes made up 51.8% of the total housing in the municipality.

The historical population is given in the following chart:

== Heritage sites of national significance ==
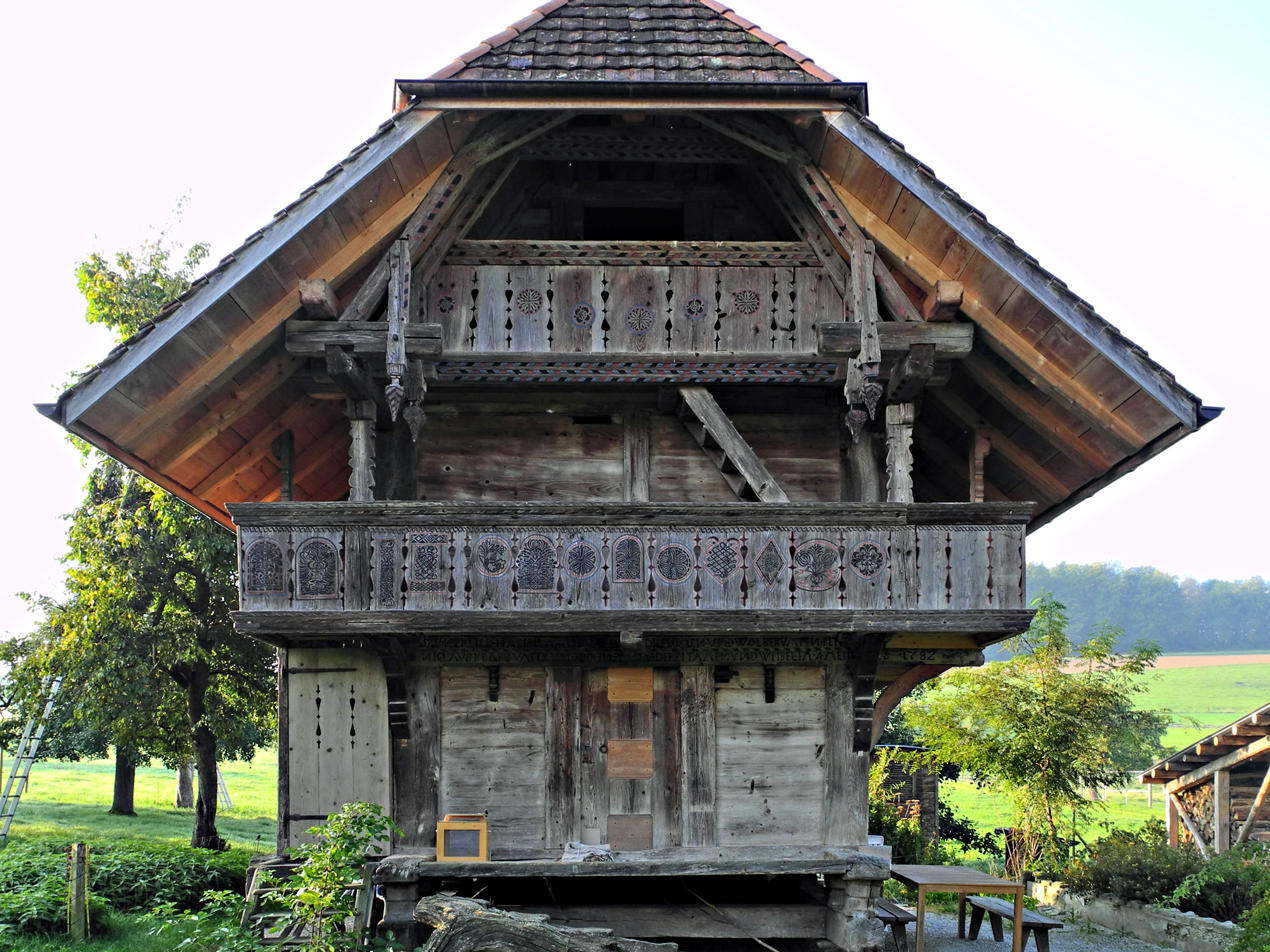
Granary

The granary at Filgesse 31 in Mühledorf is listed as a Swiss heritage site of national significance. The entire village of Kirchdorf is designated as part of the Inventory of Swiss Heritage Sites.

== Politics ==
In the 2011 federal election the most popular party was the Swiss People's Party (SVP) which received 38.3% of the vote. The next three most popular parties were the Conservative Democratic Party (BDP) (15.2%), the Social Democratic Party (SP) (11.9%) and the Green Party (9.5%). In the federal election, a total of 584 votes were cast, and the voter turnout was 55.1%.

== Economy ==
As of 2011, Kirchdorf had an unemployment rate of 1.18%. As of 2011, there were a total of 337 people employed in the municipality. Of these, there were 103 people employed in the primary economic sector and about 27 businesses involved in this sector. 86 people were employed in the secondary sector and there were 17 businesses in this sector. 148 people were employed in the tertiary sector, with 43 businesses in this sector. There were 430 residents of the municipality who were employed in some capacity, of which females made up 43.7% of the workforce.

In 2008 there were a total of 180 full-time equivalent jobs. The number of jobs in the primary sector was 74, all of which were in agriculture. The number of jobs in the secondary sector was 38 of which 15 or (39.5%) were in manufacturing and 23 (60.5%) were in construction. The number of jobs in the tertiary sector was 68. In the tertiary sector; 7 or 10.3% were in wholesale or retail sales or the repair of motor vehicles, 7 or 10.3% were in the movement and storage of goods, 8 or 11.8% were in a hotel or restaurant, 9 or 13.2% were in the information industry, 8 or 11.8% were technical professionals or scientists, 8 or 11.8% were in education and 14 or 20.6% were in health care.

In 2000, there were 88 workers who commuted into the municipality and 293 workers who commuted away. The municipality is a net exporter of workers, with about 3.3 workers leaving the municipality for every one entering. A total of 137 workers (60.9% of the 225 total workers in the municipality) both lived and worked in Kirchdorf. Of the working population, 13.3% used public transportation to get to work, and 56% used a private car.

In 2011 the average local and cantonal tax rate on a married resident, with two children, of Kirchdorf making 150,000 CHF was 12.2%, while an unmarried resident's rate was 18%. For comparison, the average rate for the entire canton in the same year, was 14.2% and 22.0%, while the nationwide average was 12.3% and 21.1% respectively.

In 2009 there were a total of 356 tax payers in the municipality. Of that total, 131 made over 75,000 CHF per year. There was one person who made between 15,000 and 20,000 per year. The average income of the over 75,000 CHF group in Kirchdorf was 126,605 CHF, while the average across all of Switzerland was 130,478 CHF.

In 2011 a total of 0.5% of the population received direct financial assistance from the government.

== Religion ==
From the 2000 census, 654 or 79.9% belonged to the Swiss Reformed Church, while 43 or 5.3% were Roman Catholic. Of the rest of the population, there was 1 member of an Orthodox church, there were 2 individuals (or about 0.24% of the population) who belonged to the Christian Catholic Church, and there were 44 individuals (or about 5.37% of the population) who belonged to another Christian church. There were 2 (or about 0.24% of the population) who were Muslim. There were 1 individual who belonged to another church. 53 (or about 6.47% of the population) belonged to no church, are agnostic or atheist, and 19 individuals (or about 2.32% of the population) did not answer the question.

== Education ==
In Kirchdorf about 61.4% of the population have completed non-mandatory upper secondary education, and 23.3% have completed additional higher education (either university or a Fachhochschule). Of the 113 who had completed some form of tertiary schooling listed in the census, 75.2% were Swiss men, 23.0% were Swiss women.

The Canton of Bern school system provides one year of non-obligatory Kindergarten, followed by six years of Primary school. This is followed by three years of obligatory lower Secondary school where the students are separated according to ability and aptitude. Following the lower Secondary students may attend additional schooling or they may enter an apprenticeship.

During the 2011-12 school year, there were a total of 98 students attending classes in Kirchdorf. There were no kindergarten classes in the municipality. The municipality had 4 primary classes and 82 students. Of the primary students, 2.4% were permanent or temporary residents of Switzerland (not citizens) and 2.4% have a different mother language than the classroom language. During the same year, there was one lower secondary class with a total of 16 students. 6.3% have a different mother language than the classroom language.

As of 2000, there were a total of 72 students attending any school in the municipality. Of those, 69 both lived and attended school in the municipality, while 3 students came from another municipality. During the same year, 58 residents attended schools outside the municipality.
