= Gerzensee =

Municipality in the canton of Bern in Switzerland

- Municipality
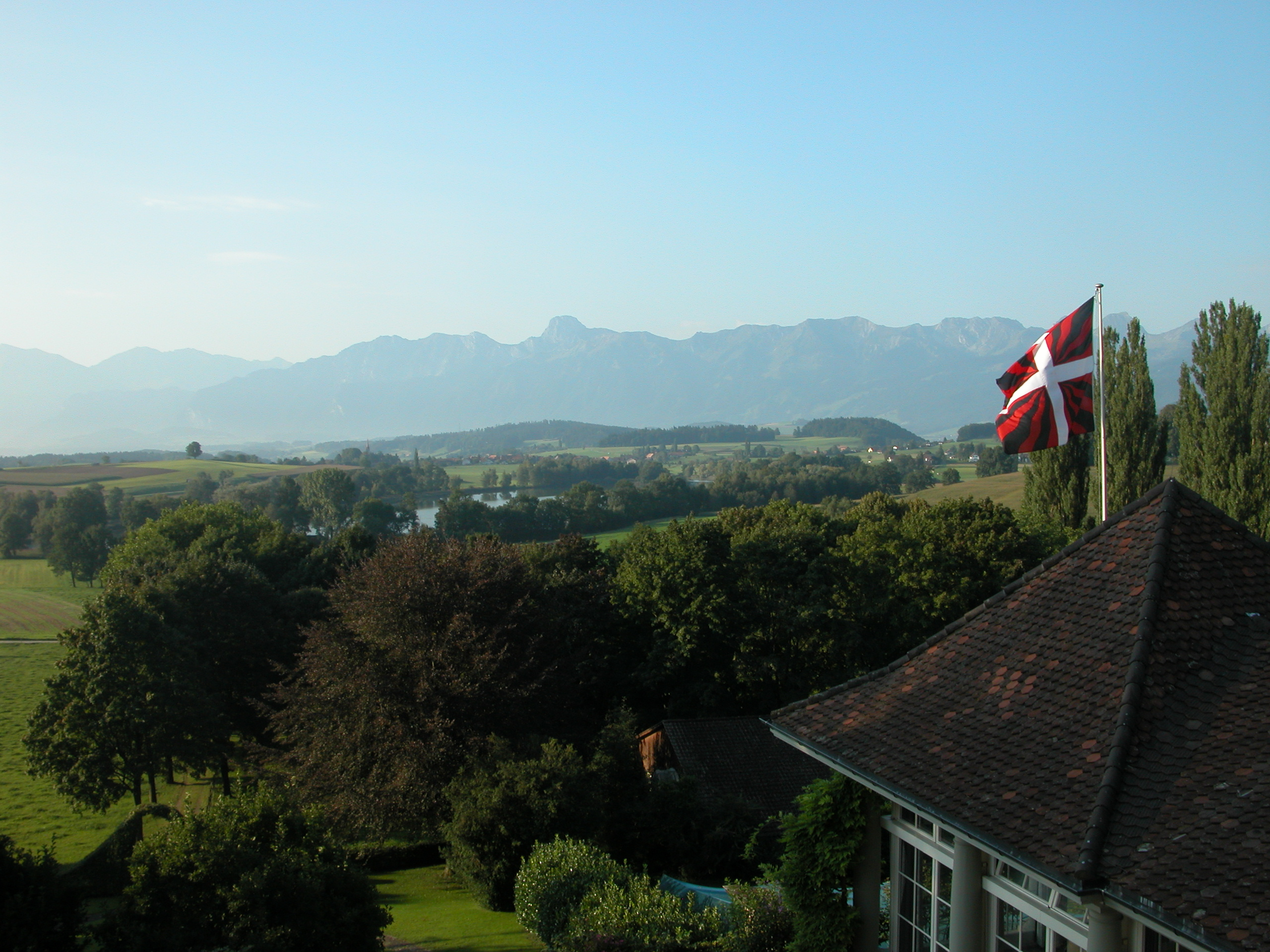

- Flag Coat of arms
- Location of Gerzensee
- Location within Switzerland Location within Canton of Bern
- Coordinates: 46°50′N 7°33′E
- Country: Switzerland
- Canton: Bern
- District: Bern-Mittelland

Government
  - Executive: Gemeinderat with 7 members
  - Mayor: Gemeindepräsident; Ernst Hossmann SVP/UDC (as of 2026)

Area
  - Total: 7.8 km^{2} (3.0 sq mi)
- Elevation: 646 m (2,119 ft)

Population (December 2020)
  - Total: 1,237
  - Density: 160/km^{2} (410/sq mi)
- Time zone: UTC+01:00 (CET)
  - Summer (DST): UTC+02:00 (CEST)
- Postal code: 3115
- SFOS number: 866
- ISO 3166 code: CH-BE
- Surrounded by: Belp, Belpberg, Gelterfingen, Kirchdorf, Mühledorf, Münsingen, Wichtrach
- Website: www.gerzensee.ch

Gerzensee is a municipality in the Bern-Mittelland administrative district in the canton of Bern in Switzerland.

The town is named after its lake, Gerzensee.

== History ==
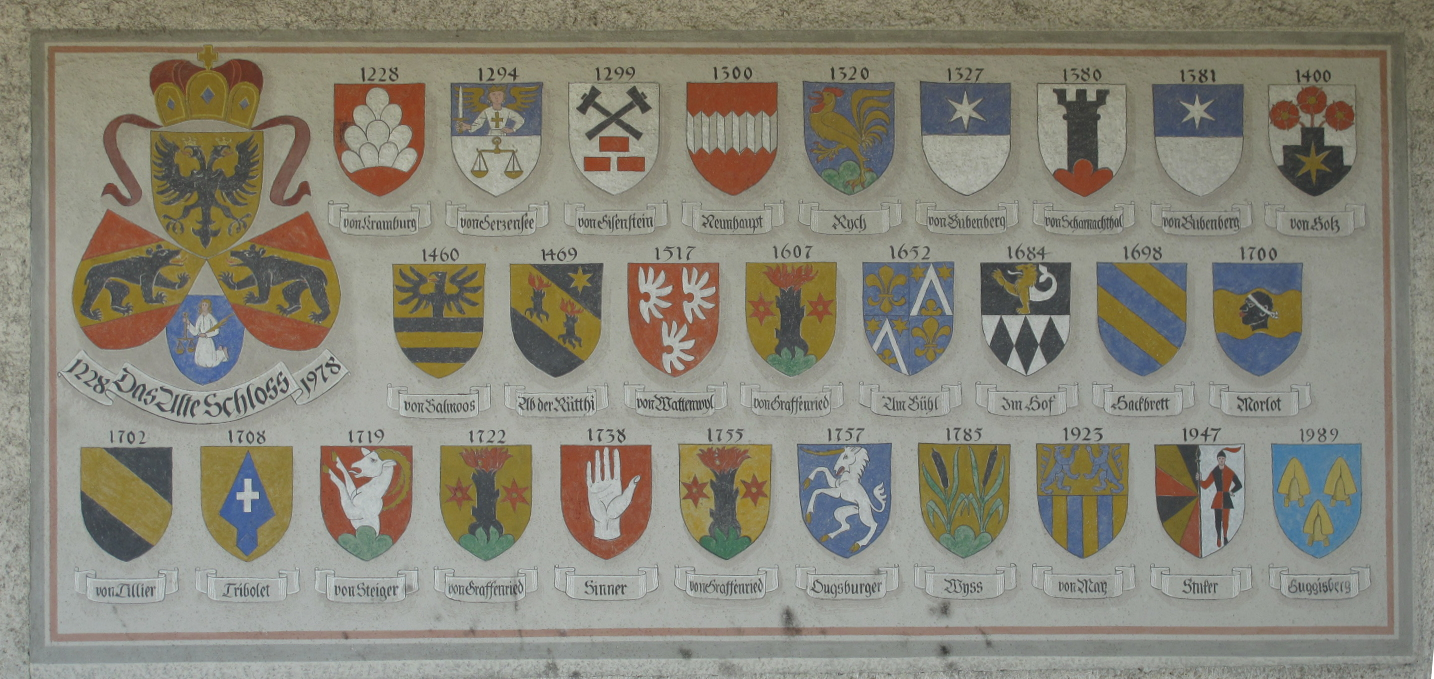
Coats of Arms of the owners of the Old Castle

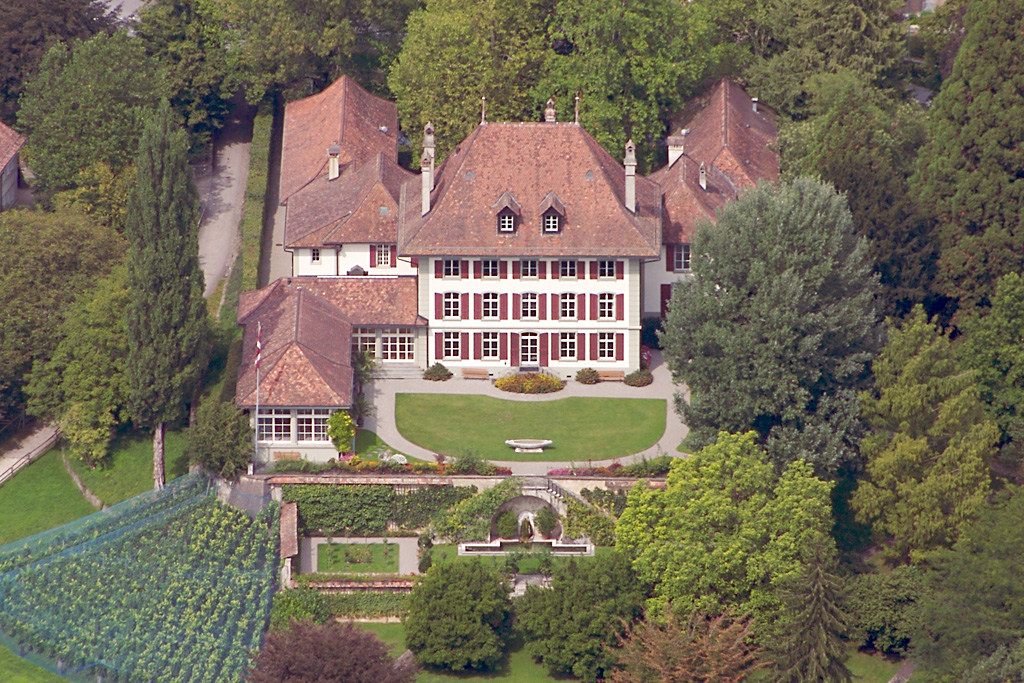
Gerzensee Castle

Aerial view (1952)

Gerzensee is first mentioned in 1228 as Gercentse.

The oldest trace of a settlement in the area comes from scattered neolithic artifacts found around the municipality. La Tène and Roman era artifacts indicate that the area remained settled. By the Middle Ages the Freiherr von Kramburg had built his Festi Castle above the village and ruled over part of the valley. After about 1300 the Kramburg lands were acquired by another noble. Over the following centuries, the land was traded and sold multiple times. At the end of the 17th century Gerzensee was divided in half and each half was sold to a different noble family.

The Festi Castle or Old Castle was damaged in a fire in 1518. Jakob von Wattenwyl had the old building rebuilt in a late-Gothic style under the direction of the master builder Balthasar Ambühl. The Old Castle passed through several owners until the Stuker family bought it in 1947.

In 1700 Samuel Morlot decided to build a country manor house, known as the New Castle, on the one-third of the estate that he owned. In 1755 Franz Emanuel Anton von Graffenried bought the scattered pieces of the estate and combined the manor house, village, lake and other farm land back into a single estate. The 1798 French invasion and creation of the Helvetic Republic eliminated the medieval court rights and other powers of the powerful landowners. In 1813 the von Graffenrieds sold the manor house and lake to the von Erlach family. They, in turn sold it to the Lindemann and Losinger families in 1918. In 1980 the Swiss National Bank acquired the New Castle and turned it into a research center.

The village church was probably built during the High Middle Ages. It first appears in a historic record in 1228 as St. Mary's Church. St. Mary's was rebuilt in the third quarter of the 15th century and then completely redone in the 16th and 17th centuries. In 1479 the villagers funded and built a chapel in the village. However, it was demolished around 1528 when Bern adopted the new faith of the Protestant Reformation and its location was lost.

During the 17th to 19th centuries, the sunny southern slope of the Belpberg mountain became popular with Bernese patricians. The Lerber, Graffenried, Luternau, Freudenreich and Büren families all built country estates above the village. In 1633 a mineral water spa opened in the village. The old baths were completely changed in a 1906 renovation. As the city of Bern grew, Gerzensee became more of a commuter town. A number of new single-family homes were built in the 1970s to house the growing population. Today about half of the workforce commutes to Bern for their jobs.

== Geography ==
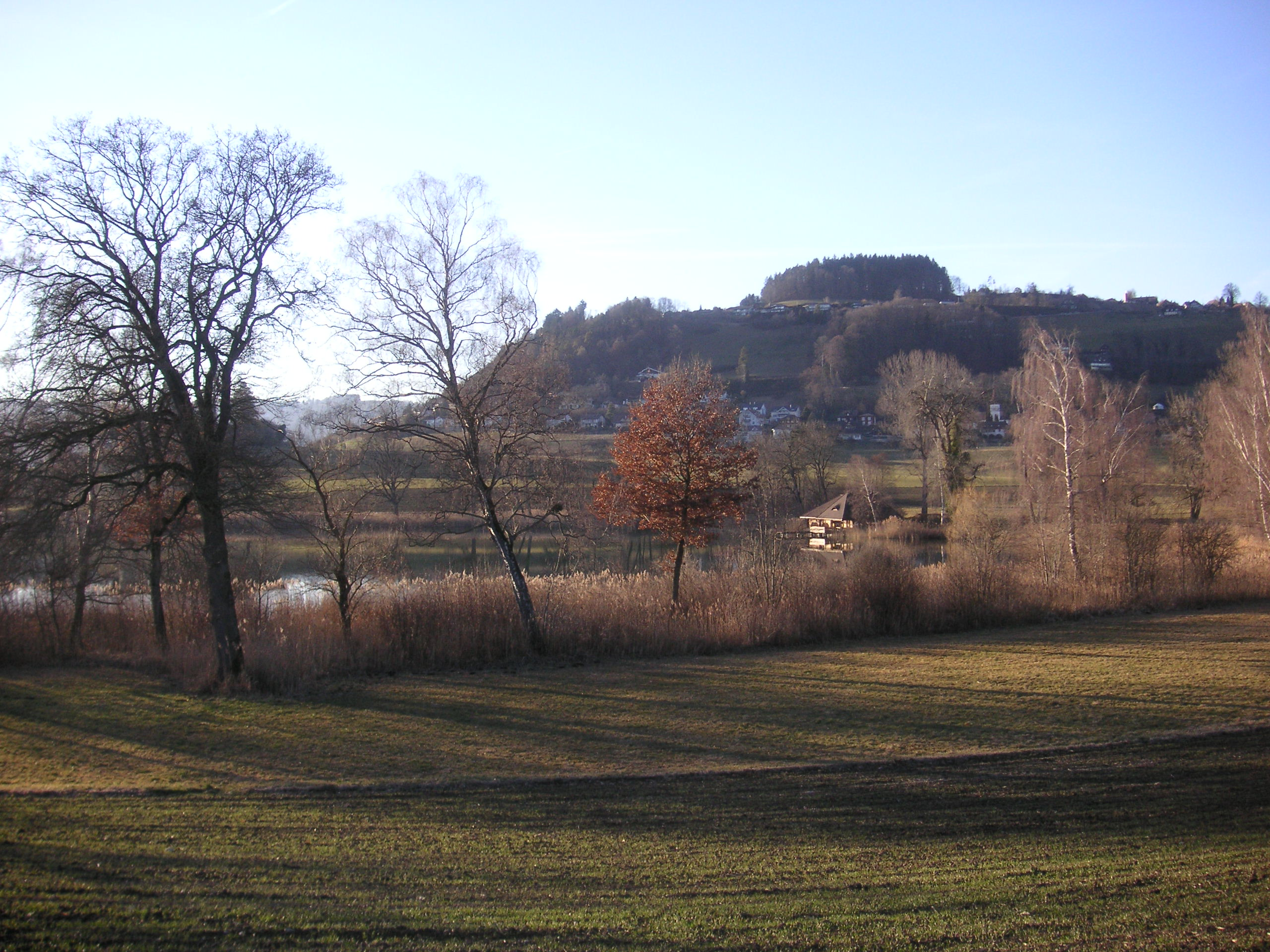
Gerzensee and Gerzensee village

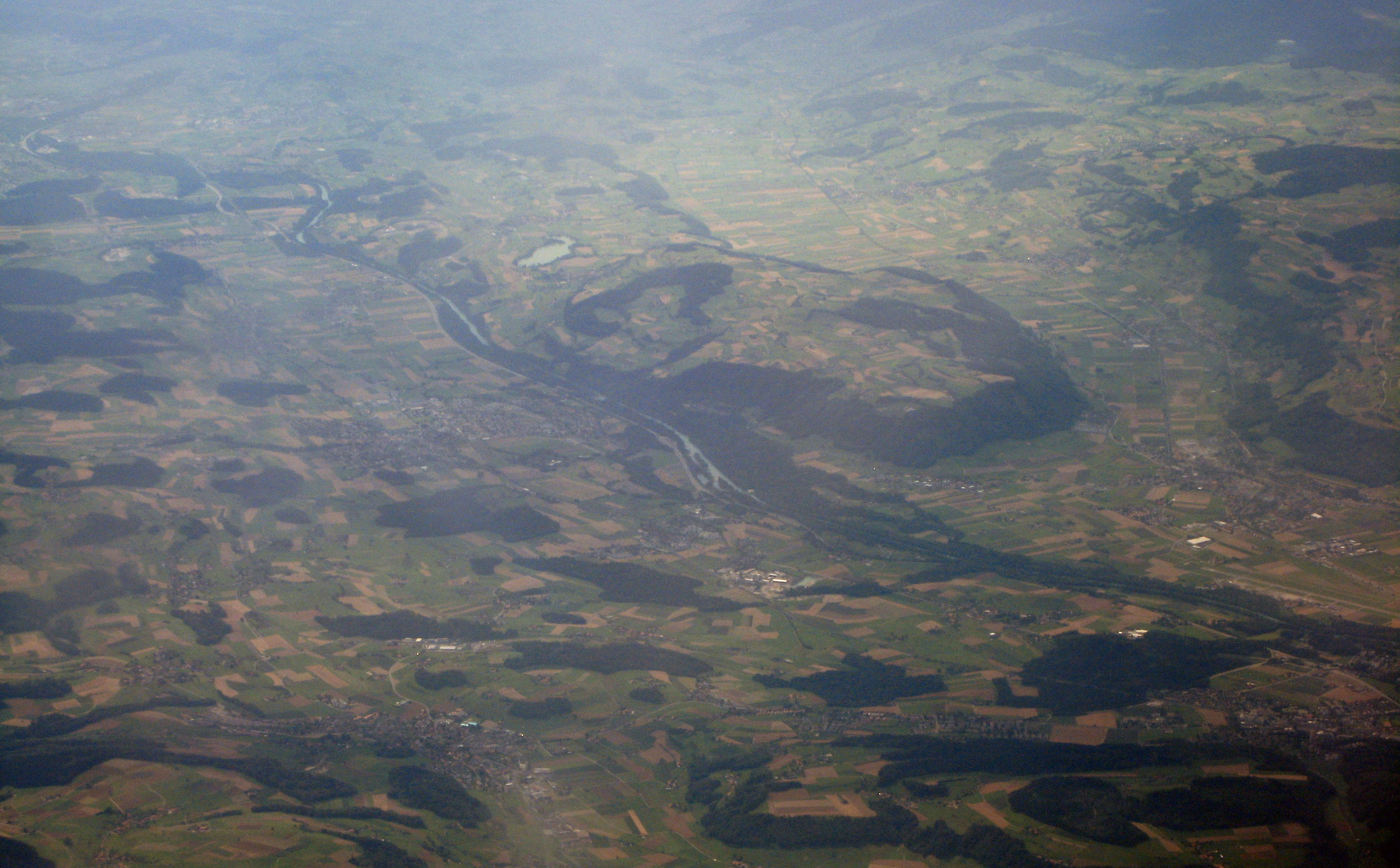
Aerial view of the Belpberg and Gürbetal. The Gerzensee lake is visible in the center

Gerzensee has an area of 7.81 km^{2} (3.02 sq mi). As of 2012, a total of 5.28 km^{2} (2.04 mi^{2}) or 67.8% is used for agricultural purposes, while 1.58 km^{2} (0.61 mi^{2}) or 20.3% is forested. The rest of the municipality is 0.7 km^{2} (0.27 mi^{2}) or 9.0% is settled (buildings or roads), 0.28 km^{2} (0.11 mi^{2}) or 3.6% is either rivers or lakes.

During the same year, housing and buildings made up 6.3% and transportation infrastructure made up 2.1%. A total of 18.6% of the total land area is heavily forested and 1.7% is covered with orchards or small clusters of trees. Of the agricultural land, 39.3% is used for growing crops and 25.7% is pasturage, while 2.8% is used for orchards or vine crops. Of the water in the municipality, 1.8% is in lakes and 1.8% is in rivers and streams.

The municipality stretches from the south-east edge of Belpberg mountain to the Aare river. The village of Gerzensee is located on a terrace above the Gerzensee Lake. It consists of the village of Gerzensee and the scattered settlements of Sädel, Vorderchlapf and Hinterchlapf.

The municipalities of Gelterfingen, Gerzensee, Kirchdorf, Mühledorf and Noflen are considering a merger on 1 January 2017 into the new municipality with an, as of 2014, undetermined name.

On 31 December 2009 Amtsbezirk Seftigen, the municipality's former district, was dissolved. On the following day, 1 January 2010, it joined the newly created Verwaltungskreis Bern-Mittelland.

== Coat of arms ==
The blazon of the municipal coat of arms is Azure an Angel volant proper robed and winged Argent holding in his dexter hand Scales Or and in his sinister a Palm Branch vert.

== Demographics ==
Gerzensee has a population (as of December 2020) of 1,237. As of 2011, 5.3% of the population are resident foreign nationals. Over the last year (2010–2011) the population has changed at a rate of 2.9%. Migration accounted for 2.3%, while births and deaths accounted for 0.9%.

Most of the population (as of 2000) speaks German (884 or 97.0%) as their first language, French is the second most common (14 or 1.5%) and Portuguese is the third (4 or 0.4%). and 1 person who speaks Romansh.

As of 2008, the population was 49.5% male and 50.5% female. The population was made up of 517 Swiss men (46.7% of the population) and 31 (2.8%) non-Swiss men. There were 533 Swiss women (48.1%) and 27 (2.4%) non-Swiss women. Of the population in the municipality, 309 or about 33.9% were born in Gerzensee and lived there in 2000. There were 415 or 45.6% who were born in the same canton, while 108 or 11.9% were born somewhere else in Switzerland, and 50 or 5.5% were born outside of Switzerland.

As of 2011, children and teenagers (0–19 years old) make up 22.5% of the population, while adults (20–64 years old) make up 61.1% and seniors (over 64 years old) make up 16.4%.

As of 2000, there were 381 people who were single and never married in the municipality. There were 440 married individuals, 44 widows or widowers and 46 individuals who are divorced.

As of 2010, there were 123 households that consist of only one person and 35 households with five or more people. In 2000, a total of 356 apartments (90.1% of the total) were permanently occupied, while 29 apartments (7.3%) were seasonally occupied and 10 apartments (2.5%) were empty. As of 2010, the construction rate of new housing units was 12.6 new units per 1000 residents. The vacancy rate for the municipality, in 2010, was 2.6%. In 2011, single family homes made up 51.9% of the total housing in the municipality.

The historical population is given in the following chart:

== Heritage sites of national significance ==
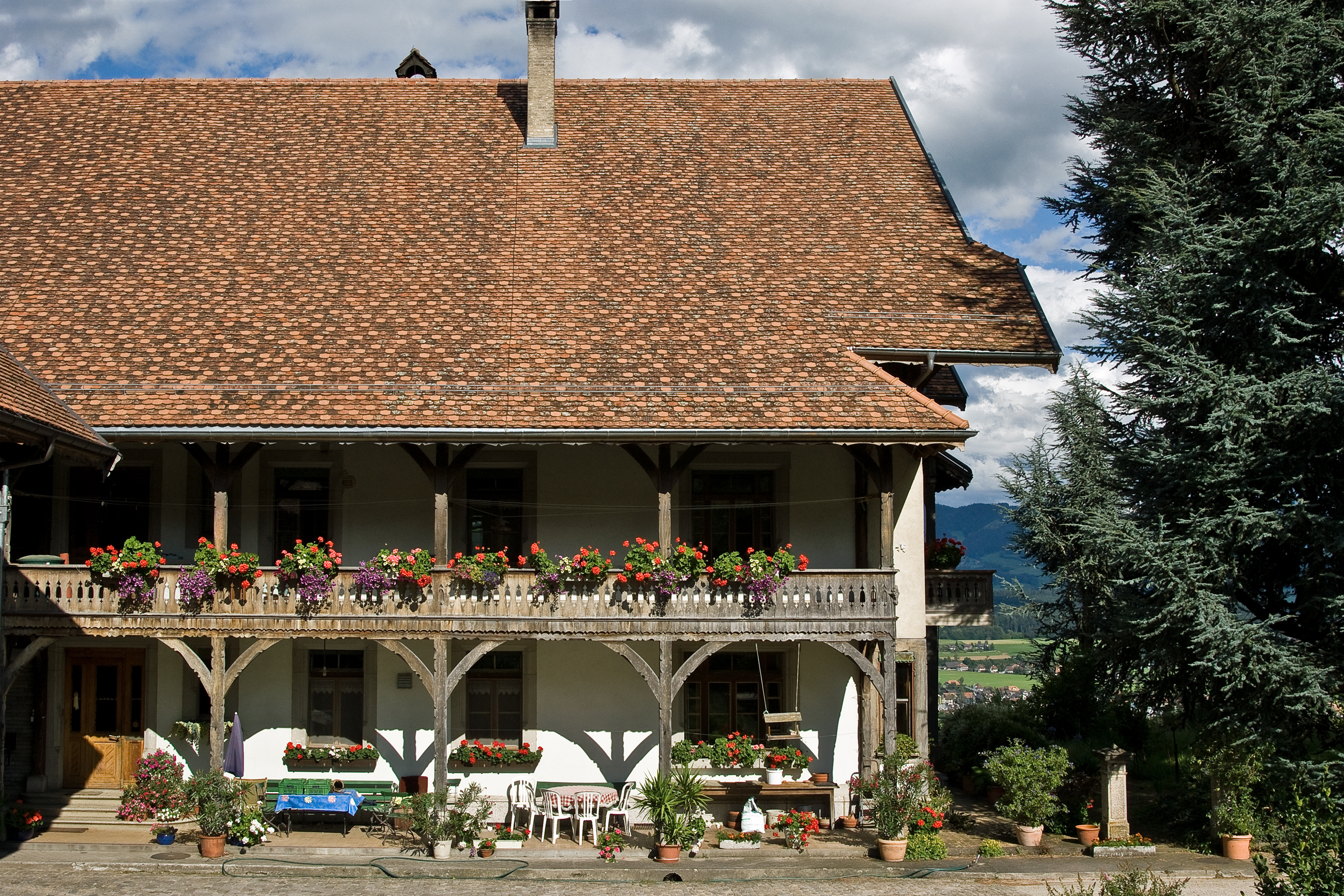
The farm house at Rütimatt

The Freiherr's farm house at Rütimatt is listed as a Swiss heritage site of national significance. The entire village of Gerzensee and the hamlet of Vordere Chlapf are part of the Inventory of Swiss Heritage Sites.

== Politics ==
In the 2011 federal election the most popular party was the Swiss People's Party (SVP) which received 38.5% of the vote. The next three most popular parties were the Conservative Democratic Party (BDP) (15.3%), the Social Democratic Party (SP) (11.9%) and the Green Party (9.3%). In the federal election, a total of 534 votes were cast, and the voter turnout was 61.6%.

== Economy ==
As of 2011, Gerzensee had an unemployment rate of 2.14%. As of 2008, there were a total of 302 people employed in the municipality. Of these, there were 98 people employed in the primary economic sector and about 35 businesses involved in this sector. 59 people were employed in the secondary sector and there were 10 businesses in this sector. 145 people were employed in the tertiary sector, with 25 businesses in this sector. There were 492 residents of the municipality who were employed in some capacity, of which females made up 43.5% of the workforce.

In 2008 there were a total of 230 full-time equivalent jobs. The number of jobs in the primary sector was 61, all of which were in agriculture. The number of jobs in the secondary sector was 51 of which 14 or (27.5%) were in manufacturing, 26 or (51.0%) were in mining and 12 (23.5%) were in construction. The number of jobs in the tertiary sector was 118. In the tertiary sector; 19 or 16.1% were in wholesale or retail sales or the repair of motor vehicles, 8 or 6.8% were in the movement and storage of goods, 47 or 39.8% were in a hotel or restaurant, 2 or 1.7% were technical professionals or scientists, 24 or 20.3% were in education and 5 or 4.2% were in health care.

In 2000, there were 132 workers who commuted into the municipality and 302 workers who commuted away. The municipality is a net exporter of workers, with about 2.3 workers leaving the municipality for every one entering. A total of 190 workers (59.0% of the 322 total workers in the municipality) both lived and worked in Gerzensee. Of the working population, 15.7% used public transportation to get to work, and 50.8% used a private car.

In 2011 the average local and cantonal tax rate on a married resident, with two children, of Gerzensee making 150,000 CHF was 12.2%, while an unmarried resident's rate was 17.9%. For comparison, the average rate for the entire canton in the same year, was 14.2% and 22.0%, while the nationwide average was 12.3% and 21.1% respectively.

In 2009 there were a total of 466 tax payers in the municipality. Of that total, 188 made over 75,000 CHF per year. The average income of the over 75,000 CHF group in Gerzensee was 143,489 CHF, while the average across all of Switzerland was 130,478 CHF.

In 2011 a total of 0.5% of the population received direct financial assistance from the government.

== Religion ==
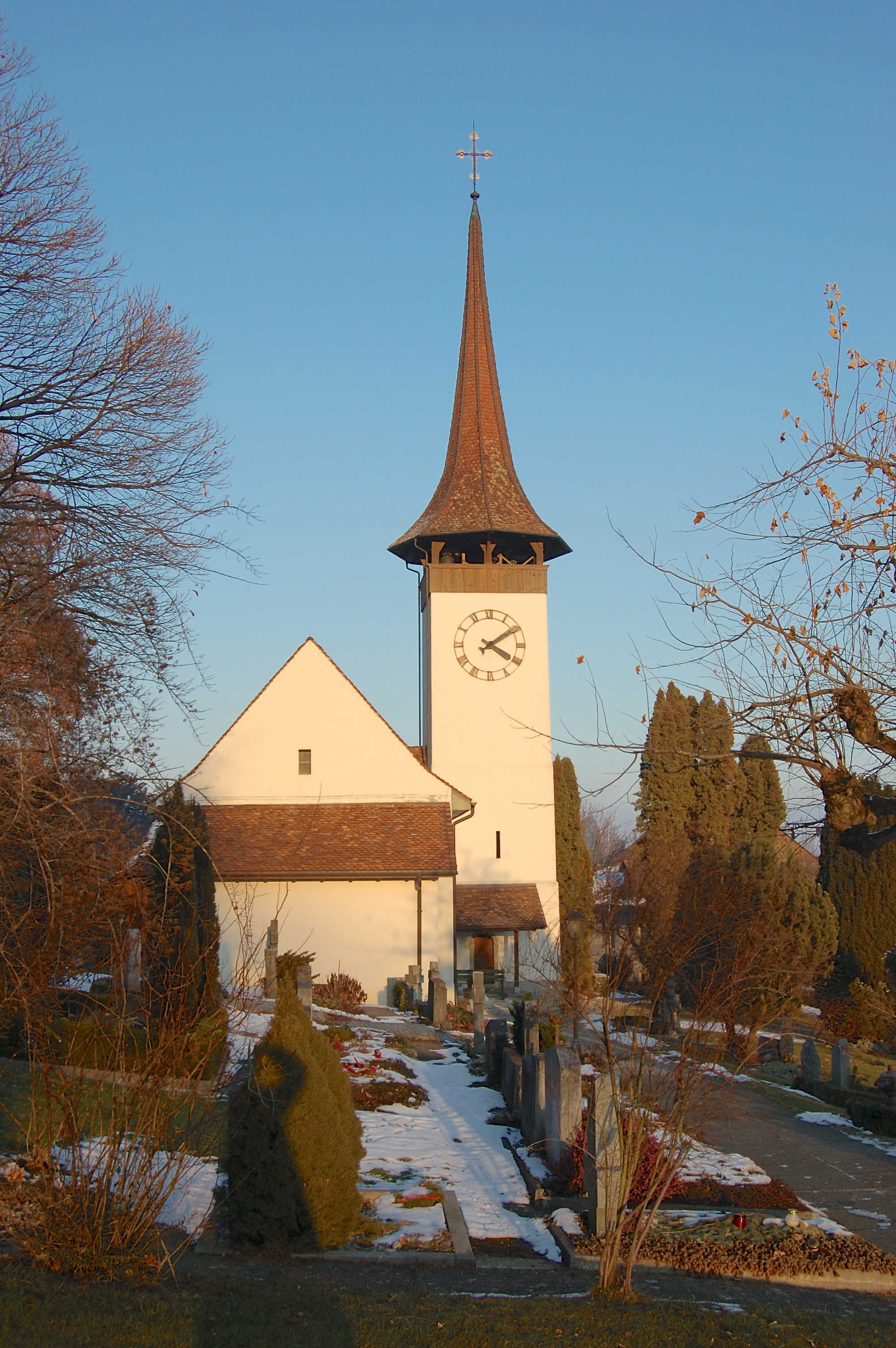
Gerzensee village church

From the 2000 census, 690 or 75.7% belonged to the Swiss Reformed Church, while 77 or 8.5% were Roman Catholic. Of the rest of the population, there was 1 member of an Orthodox church, and there were 42 individuals (or about 4.61% of the population) who belonged to another Christian church. There were 6 (or about 0.66% of the population) who were Muslim. There was 1 person who was Hindu. 71 (or about 7.79% of the population) belonged to no church, are agnostic or atheist, and 23 individuals (or about 2.52% of the population) did not answer the question.

== Education ==
In Gerzensee about 55.2% of the population have completed non-mandatory upper secondary education, and 23.4% have completed additional higher education (either university or a Fachhochschule). Of the 138 who had completed some form of tertiary schooling listed in the census, 69.6% were Swiss men, 27.5% were Swiss women.

The Canton of Bern school system provides one year of non-obligatory Kindergarten, followed by six years of Primary school. This is followed by three years of obligatory lower Secondary school where the students are separated according to ability and aptitude. Following the lower Secondary students may attend additional schooling or they may enter an apprenticeship.

During the 2011–12 school year, there were a total of 107 students attending classes in Gerzensee. There was one kindergarten class with a total of 19 students in the municipality. Of the kindergarten students, 5.3% were permanent or temporary residents of Switzerland (not citizens). The municipality had 3 primary classes and 60 students. Of the primary students, 5.0% were permanent or temporary residents of Switzerland (not citizens). During the same year, there were 2 lower secondary classes with a total of 28 students.

As of 2000, there were a total of 118 students attending any school in the municipality. Of those, 83 both lived and attended school in the municipality, while 35 students came from another municipality. During the same year, 42 residents attended schools outside the municipality.
