= Belpberg =

- Former municipality
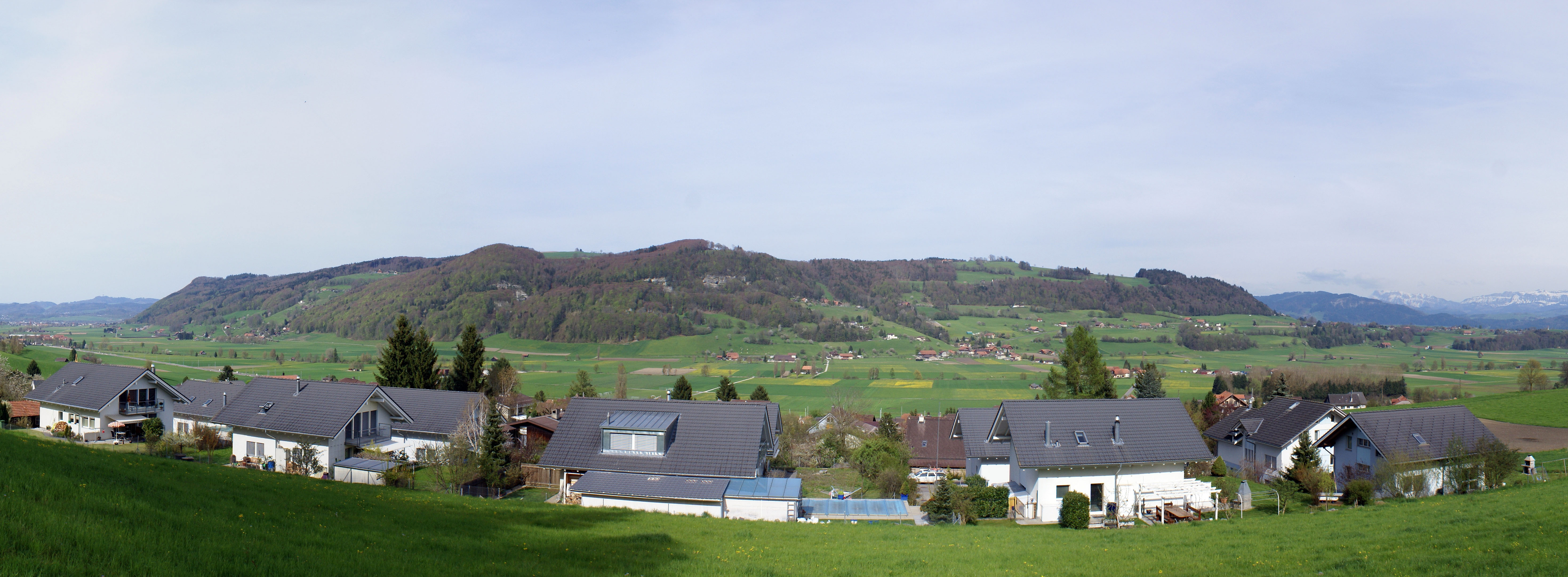

- Flag Coat of arms
- Location of Belpberg
- Location within Switzerland Location within Canton of Bern
- Coordinates: 46°52′N 7°31′E
- Country: Switzerland
- Canton: Bern
- District: Seftigen

Area
  - Total: 5.7 km^{2} (2.2 sq mi)
- Elevation: 802 m (2,631 ft)

Population (December 2020)
  - Total: 423
  - Density: 74/km^{2} (190/sq mi)
- Demonym: Belpberger
- Time zone: UTC+01:00 (CET)
  - Summer (DST): UTC+02:00 (CEST)
- Postal code: 3124
- SFOS number: 862
- ISO 3166 code: CH-BE
- Surrounded by: Belp, Gelterfingen, Gerzensee, Toffen
- Website: SFSO statistics

Belpberg is a former municipality in the Bern-Mittelland administrative district in the canton of Bern in Switzerland. The municipality of Belpberg merged on 1 January 2012 into the municipality of Belp.

The villages historic dependency on agriculture, dairy farming and cattle breeding have continued to the present day. There is otherwise little employment within the commune, and most of the working inhabitants commute to nearby towns, particularly Bern.

== History ==
Roman and Celtic coinage points to an early settlement in the area. The first documented use of the name Belpberge is found in 1342, with the versions Belperg (1380) and Beltperg (1390) appearing later. The etymology of the word stem Belp is unclear.

== Geography ==
Belpberg has an area, as of 2009, of 5.7 km^{2} (2.2 sq mi). Of this area, 3.74 km^{2} (1.44 sq mi) or 65.6% is used for agricultural purposes, while1.61 km^{2} (0.62 sq mi) or 28.2% is forested. Of the rest of the land, 0.31 km^{2} (0.12 sq mi) or 5.4% is settled (buildings or roads).

Of the built up area, housing and buildings made up 2.3% and transportation infrastructure made up 3.0%. 26.7% of the total land area is heavily forested and 1.6% is covered with orchards or small clusters of trees. Of the agricultural land, 36.1% is used for growing crops and 27.9% is pastures, while 1.6% is used for orchards or vine crops.

It is located on a hill that shares the town's name, between the Aare river and the Gürbetal. It includes a number of hamlets (including Linden, Oberhäusern, Hofstetten, z.T. Heitern) and scattered farmhouses. It belongs to the parish of Belp.

== Demographics ==
Belpberg had a population (as of 31 December 2020) of 423. As of 2007, 2.1% of the population was made up of foreign nationals. Over the last 10 years the population has decreased at a rate of -2.3%. Most of the population (as of 2000) speaks German (99.5%), with Italian being second most common (0.3%) and Portuguese being third (0.3%).

In the 2007 election the most popular party was the SVP which received 59.2% of the vote. The next three most popular parties were the SPS (10.5%), the local small left-wing parties (7.7%) and the FDP (7%).

The age distribution of the population (as of 2000) is children and teenagers (0–19 years old) make up 19.3% of the population, while adults (20–64 years old) make up 62.5% and seniors (over 64 years old) make up 18.2%. The entire Swiss population is generally well educated. In Belpberg about 83.1% of the population (between age 25-64) have completed either non-mandatory upper secondary education or additional higher education (either University or a Fachhochschule).

Belpberg has an unemployment rate of 1.21%. As of 2005, there were 107 people employed in the primary economic sector and about 33 businesses involved in this sector. 6 people are employed in the secondary sector and there are 3 businesses in this sector. 14 people are employed in the tertiary sector, with 5 businesses in this sector. The historical population is given in the following table:

year	population
764	229
1850	501
1900	439
1950	433
2000	373
