= Kienersrüti =

- Former municipality
- Flag Coat of arms
- Location of Kienersrüti
- Location within Switzerland Location within Canton of Bern
- Coordinates: 46°48′N 7°34′E
- Country: Switzerland
- Canton: Bern
- District: Thun

Area
  - Total: 0.8 km^{2} (0.31 sq mi)
- Elevation: 579 m (1,900 ft)

Population (Dec 2011)
  - Total: 52
  - Density: 65/km^{2} (170/sq mi)
- Time zone: UTC+01:00 (CET)
  - Summer (DST): UTC+02:00 (CEST)
- Postal code: 3628
- SFOS number: 871
- ISO 3166 code: CH-BE
- Surrounded by: Kirchdorf, Noflen, Uetendorf, Uttigen
- Website: SFSO statistics

Kienersrüti is a former municipality in the administrative district of Thun in the canton of Bern in Switzerland. On 1 January 2014 the former municipality of Kienersrüti merged into the municipality of Uttigen.

It was the third-smallest independent municipality in the canton. It is rural in character and its economy based mostly on farming. A regional popular saying names it "the one street lantern town".

== Geography ==
Before the merger, Kienersrüti had a total area of .8 km^{2} (0.31 mi^{2}). Of this area, 0.65 km^{2} (0.25 sq mi) or 87.8% is used for agricultural purposes, while 0.09 km^{2} (22 acres) or 12.2% is forested. Of the rest of the land, 0.02 km^{2} (4.9 acres) or 2.7% is settled (buildings or roads).

Of the built up area, housing and buildings made up 2.7% and transportation infrastructure made up 0.0%. 12.2% of the total land area is heavily forested. Of the agricultural land, 48.6% is used for growing crops and 35.1% is pastures, while 4.1% is used for orchards or vine crops.

== Demographics ==
Kienersrüti had a population (as of 2011) of 52. Over the last 10 years the population has decreased at a rate of -9.1%. All of the population (as of 2000) speaks German.

In the 2007 election the most popular party was the SPS which received 30% of the vote. The next three most popular parties were the SVP (29.3%), the local small left-wing parties (14.3%) and the Green Party (8.9%).

The age distribution of the population (as of 2000) is children and teenagers (0–19 years old) make up 13.5% of the population, while adults (20–64 years old) make up 71.2% and seniors (over 64 years old) make up 15.4%. In Kienersrüti about 80.6% of the population (between age 25-64) have completed either non-mandatory upper secondary education or additional higher education (either university or a Fachhochschule).

Kienersrüti has an unemployment rate of 0%. As of 2005, there were 24 people employed in the primary economic sector and about 6 businesses involved in this sector. 1 person is employed in the secondary sector and there is 1 business in this sector. No one is employed in the tertiary sector. The historical population is given in the following table:

year	population
1764	43
1850	91
1870	108
1900	48
1950	79
2000	52
