= Jaberg =

- Municipality
- Flag Coat of arms
- Location of Jaberg
- Location within Switzerland Location within Canton of Bern
- Coordinates: 46°49′N 7°34′E
- Country: Switzerland
- Canton: Bern
- District: Bern-Mittelland

Government
  - Executive: Gemeinderat with 5 members
  - Mayor: Gemeindepräsident; Marianne Zürcher (as of 2026)

Area
  - Total: 1.3 km^{2} (0.50 sq mi)
- Elevation: 540 m (1,770 ft)

Population (December 2020)
  - Total: 306
  - Density: 240/km^{2} (610/sq mi)
- Time zone: UTC+01:00 (CET)
  - Summer (DST): UTC+02:00 (CEST)
- Postal code: 3629
- SFOS number: 868
- ISO 3166 code: CH-BE
- Surrounded by: Kiesen, Kirchdorf, Uttigen, Wichtrach
- Website: www.jaberg.ch

Jaberg is a municipality in the Bern-Mittelland administrative district in the canton of Bern in Switzerland.

== History ==
Jaberg is first mentioned in 1259 as Jagberc.

The oldest trace of a settlement in the area is a Hallstatt burial mound. During the Early Middle Ages the same area was used as a cemetery. A small hill fort from the same era indicates that there was probably a village near the Jabergwald. During the Middle Ages wooden castle was built near the Aare ferry. According to Konrad Justinger it was destroyed by Bern in 1286. The village was probably owned by the Lords of Krauchtal until the 15th century, when it was acquired by a noble family from Bern. The village passed through several landowners before being acquired by Bern city around 1528, when Bern adopted the new faith of the Protestant Reformation.

Today the village is mostly rural and agrarian with most of the farms raising livestock. A gravel pit and a regional landfill provide additional jobs. Since the 1970s it has slowly been transformed into a bedroom community and now about four-fifths of the population commute to jobs in nearby towns and cities.

== Geography ==
Jaberg has an area of 1.31 km^{2} (0.51 sq mi). As of 2012, a total of 0.68 km^{2} (0.26 mi^{2}) or 51.5% is used for agricultural purposes, while 0.3 km^{2} (0.12 mi^{2}) or 22.7% is forested. The rest of the municipality is 0.24 km^{2} (0.093 mi^{2}) or 18.2% is settled (buildings or roads), 0.06 km^{2} (15 acres) or 4.5% is either rivers or lakes.

During the same year, housing and buildings made up 6.1% and transportation infrastructure made up 4.5%. Power and water infrastructure as well as other special developed areas made up 7.6% of the area A total of 18.9% of the total land area is heavily forested and 3.8% is covered with orchards or small clusters of trees. Of the agricultural land, 34.8% is used for growing crops and 13.6% is pasturage, while 3.0% is used for orchards or vine crops. All the water in the municipality is flowing water.

The municipality is located on the hilly left bank of the Aare river. It includes the villages of Hinter and Vorder Jaberg. The former exclave of Stoffelsrüti became part of Noflen in 1948.

On 31 December 2009 Amtsbezirk Seftigen, the municipality's former district, was dissolved. On the following day, 1 January 2010, it joined the newly created Verwaltungskreis Bern-Mittelland.

== Coat of arms ==
The blazon of the municipal coat of arms is Per bend wavy Argent a Rose Gules barbed and seeded proper and Azure a Rose Argent barbed and seeded proper.

== Demographics ==
Jaberg has a population (as of December 2020) of 306. As of 2012, 3.2% of the population are resident foreign nationals. Over the last 2 years (2010-2012) the population has changed at a rate of -2.7%. Migration accounted for -2.7%, while births and deaths accounted for -0.4%.

Most of the population (as of 2000) speaks German (229 or 97.4%) as their first language, Italian is the second most common (2 or 0.9%) and Portuguese is the third (2 or 0.9%).

As of 2008, the population was 45.9% male and 54.1% female. The population was made up of 115 Swiss men (44.4% of the population) and 4 (1.5%) non-Swiss men. There were 138 Swiss women (53.3%) and 2 (0.8%) non-Swiss women. Of the population in the municipality, 65 or about 27.7% were born in Jaberg and lived there in 2000. There were 128 or 54.5% who were born in the same canton, while 31 or 13.2% were born somewhere else in Switzerland, and 10 or 4.3% were born outside of Switzerland.

As of 2012, children and teenagers (0–19 years old) make up 22.2% of the population, while adults (20–64 years old) make up 63.8% and seniors (over 64 years old) make up 13.8%.

As of 2000, there were 97 people who were single and never married in the municipality. There were 117 married individuals, 12 widows or widowers and 9 individuals who are divorced.

As of 2010, there were 27 households that consist of only one person and 7 households with five or more people. In 2000, a total of 95 apartments (93.1% of the total) were permanently occupied, while 2 apartments (2.0%) were seasonally occupied and 5 apartments (4.9%) were empty. In 2011, single family homes made up 67.5% of the total housing in the municipality.

The historical population is given in the following chart:

== Economy ==
As of 2011, Jaberg had an unemployment rate of 0.6%. As of 2011, there were a total of 56 people employed in the municipality. Of these, there were 13 people employed in the primary economic sector and about 5 businesses involved in this sector. 18 people were employed in the secondary sector and there was 1 business in this sector. 25 people were employed in the tertiary sector, with 13 businesses in this sector. There were 122 residents of the municipality who were employed in some capacity, of which females made up 41.8% of the workforce.

In 2008 there were a total of 40 full-time equivalent jobs. The number of jobs in the primary sector was 8, all in agriculture. The number of jobs in the secondary sector was 18 of which 1 was in manufacturing and the rest were in the waste treatment industry. The number of jobs in the tertiary sector was 14. In the tertiary sector; 3 or 21.4% were in wholesale or retail sales or the repair of motor vehicles, and 7 or 50.0% were technical professionals or scientists.

In 2000, there were 43 workers who commuted into the municipality and 99 workers who commuted away. The municipality is a net exporter of workers, with about 2.3 workers leaving the municipality for every one entering. A total of 23 workers (34.8% of the 66 total workers in the municipality) both lived and worked in Jaberg. Of the working population, 29.5% used public transportation to get to work, and 47.5% used a private car.

In 2011 the average local and cantonal tax rate on a married resident, with two children, of Jaberg making 150,000 CHF was 12%, while an unmarried resident's rate was 17.6%. For comparison, the average rate for the entire canton in the same year, was 14.2% and 22.0%, while the nationwide average was 12.3% and 21.1% respectively.

In 2009 there were a total of 117 tax payers in the municipality. Of that total, 51 made over 75,000 CHF per year. The average income of the over 75,000 CHF group in Jaberg was 103,606 CHF, while the average across all of Switzerland was 130,478 CHF.

In 2011 a total of 0.4% of the population received direct financial assistance from the government.

== Religion ==
From the 2000 census, 172 or 73.2% belonged to the Swiss Reformed Church, while 31 or 13.2% were Roman Catholic. Of the rest of the population, there were 3 individuals (or about 1.28% of the population) who belonged to the Christian Catholic Church, and there were 6 individuals (or about 2.55% of the population) who belonged to another Christian church. There was 1 individual who was Jewish, and 3 (or about 1.28% of the population) who were Muslim. There was 1 person who was Buddhist and 1 individual who belonged to another church. 13 (or about 5.53% of the population) belonged to no church, are agnostic or atheist, and 4 individuals (or about 1.70% of the population) did not answer the question.

== Education ==
In Jaberg about 64% of the population have completed non-mandatory upper secondary education, and 23.5% have completed additional higher education (either university or a Fachhochschule). Of the 36 who had completed some form of tertiary schooling listed in the census, 77.8% were Swiss men, 19.4% were Swiss women.

As of 2000, there were a total of 33 students from Jaberg who attended schools outside the municipality.
