= Kiesen =

- Municipality
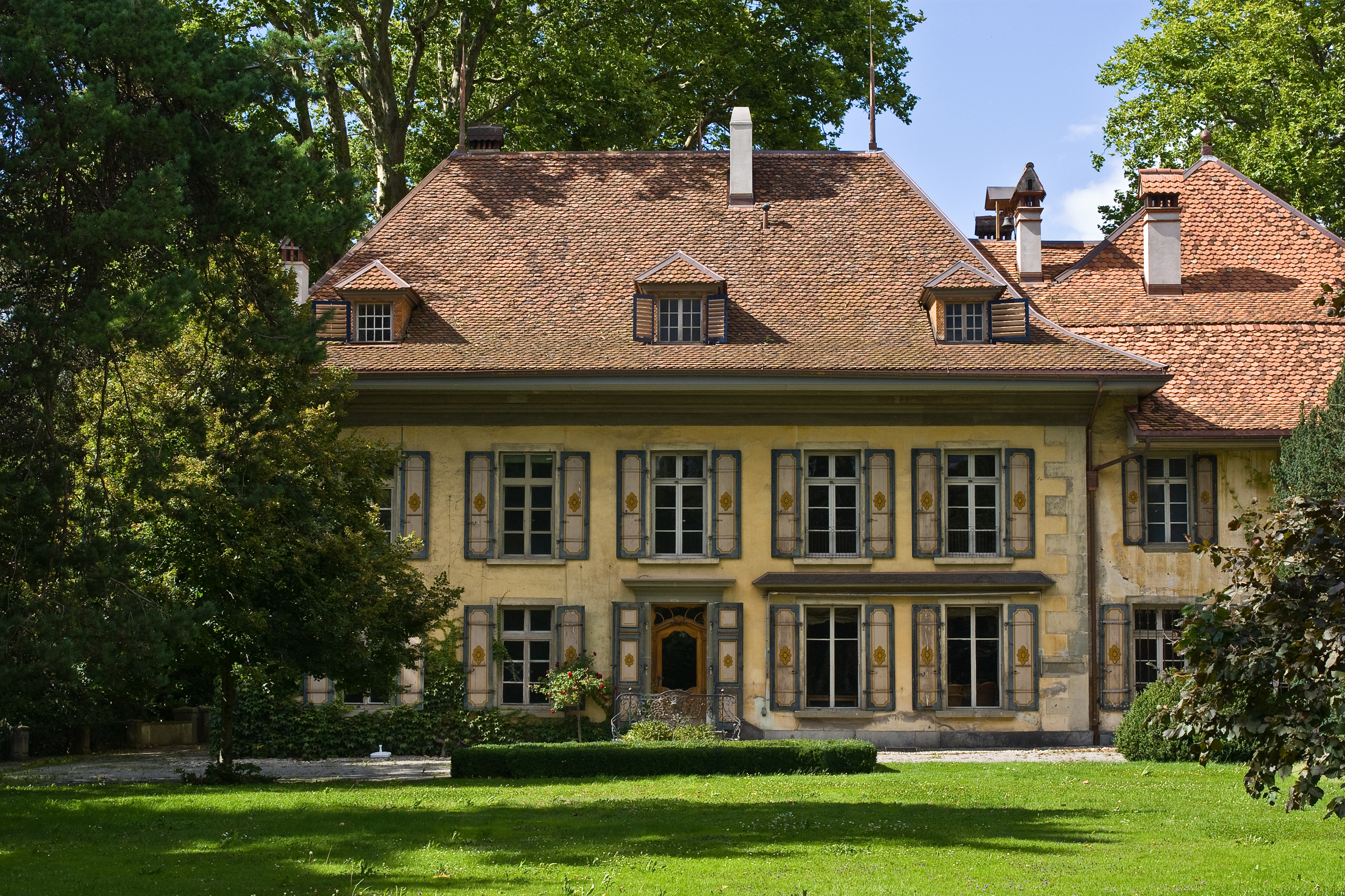
- Kiesen Castle

- Flag Coat of arms
- Location of Kiesen
- Location within Switzerland Location within Canton of Bern
- Coordinates: 46°49′N 7°35′E
- Country: Switzerland
- Canton: Bern
- District: Bern-Mittelland

Government
  - Executive: Gemeinderat with 7 members
  - Mayor: Gemeindepräsident; Ernst Waber (as of 2026)

Area
  - Total: 4.7 km^{2} (1.8 sq mi)
- Elevation: 547 m (1,795 ft)

Population (December 2020)
  - Total: 1,012
  - Density: 220/km^{2} (560/sq mi)
- Time zone: UTC+01:00 (CET)
  - Summer (DST): UTC+02:00 (CEST)
- Postal code: 3629
- SFOS number: 611
- ISO 3166 code: CH-BE
- Surrounded by: Heimberg, Jaberg, Oppligen, Uttigen, Wichtrach
- Twin towns: Zeliv (Czech Republic)
- Website: www.kiesen.ch

Kiesen is a municipality in the Bern-Mittelland administrative district in the canton of Bern in Switzerland.

== History ==
Aerial view from 500 m by Walter Mittelholzer (1922)

The oldest trace of a settlement in the area is a Neolithic stone ax which was found at Rotachen. Other prehistoric finds include scattered late-Bronze Age items and tools and Roman coins. The village Kiesen is first mentioned in 1236 as Chisun. At that time much of the village was owned by Interlaken Monastery. Beginning in the 14th century, it was owned by several noble families from the city of Bern. In 1579, a fire destroyed most of the buildings in the village. In 1668 a wealthy family built a country manor house on the remains of a medieval castle on the edge of the village. It passed through a couple of hands before the Effinger family of Wildegg bought it in 1776. In 1793 they rebuilt the manor house into its current appearance. In 1815, Rudolf Emanuel Effinger, built a dairy and cheese maker's shop on the estate's grounds. This was the first cheese maker in the Canton of Bern. The estate dairy encouraged farmers throughout the Canton to switch to dairy farming during the 19th century and led to the development of the cheese industry in Bern. The estate was rebuilt and renovated and sold to the Dollfus family of Volckersberg, who held it until 1993. The estate dairy became the Dairy Museum in 1974.

Until the Aare water correction project of 1826, the village had maintained their own flood control system. In 1830 a bridge was built over the river, replacing the local ferry. A dock was also built on the river around this time. The Bern-Thun railway built a station in Kiesen in 1859. However, the traditional character of the village remained mostly intact until the construction of the A6 motorway in 1971. A number of farms were moved and marshes were drained. Beginning in the 1980s many commuters moved into the village to take advantage of the convenient transportation links.

== Geography ==
Kiesen has an area of 4.69 km^{2} (1.81 sq mi). Of this area, 2.48 km^{2} (0.96 mi^{2}) or 53.0% is used for agricultural purposes, while 1.25 km^{2} (0.48 mi^{2}) or 26.7% is forested. Of the rest of the land, 0.84 km^{2} (0.32 mi^{2}) or 17.9% is settled (buildings or roads), 0.13 km^{2} (32 acres) or 2.8% is either rivers or lakes and 0.01 km^{2} (2.5 acres) or 0.2% is unproductive land.

Of the built up area, housing and buildings made up 4.3% and transportation infrastructure made up 9.8%. while parks, green belts and sports fields made up 2.8%. Out of the forested land, all of the forested land area is covered with heavy forests. Of the agricultural land, 41.5% is used for growing crops and 10.9% is pastures. Of the water in the municipality, 0.2% is in lakes and 2.6% is in rivers and streams.

It is located along the banks of the Chisen and Rotachen Rivers where they flow into the Aare River.

On 31 December 2009 Amtsbezirk Konolfingen, the municipality's former district, was dissolved. On the following day, 1 January 2010, it joined the newly created Verwaltungskreis Bern-Mittelland.

== Coat of arms ==
The blazon of the municipal coat of arms is Or a Merchant's Mark Sable between two Flames Gules issuant from a Mount of 3 Coupeaux Vert.

== Demographics ==
Kiesen has a population (as of December 2020) of 1,012. As of 2013, 4.6% of the population are resident foreign nationals. From 2010 to 2013 the population changed at a rate of 7.4%. Most of the population (as of 2000) speaks German (708 or 95.4%) as their first language, Albanian is the second most common (9 or 1.2%) and Serbo-Croatian is the third (7 or 0.9%). There are 4 people who speak French, 3 people who speak Italian and 1 person who speaks Romansh.

As of 2008, the population was 48.7% male and 51.3% female. The population was made up of 390 Swiss men (46.5% of the population) and 18 (2.1%) non-Swiss men. There were 412 Swiss women (49.2%) and 18 (2.1%) non-Swiss women. Of the population in the municipality, 193 or about 26.0% were born in Kiesen and lived there in 2000. There were 387 or 52.2% who were born in the same canton, while 99 or 13.3% were born somewhere else in Switzerland, and 51 or 6.9% were born outside of Switzerland.

As of 2011, children and teenagers (0–19 years old) make up 22% of the population, while adults (20–64 years old) make up 66.2% and seniors (over 64 years old) make up 11.8%.

As of 2000, there were 321 people who were single and never married in the municipality. There were 356 married individuals, 33 widows or widowers and 32 individuals who are divorced.

As of 2000, there were 87 households that consist of only one person and 24 households with five or more people. In 2000, a total of 286 apartments (94.1% of the total) were permanently occupied, while 9 apartments (3.0%) were seasonally occupied and 9 apartments (3.0%) were empty. As of 2010, the construction rate of new housing units was 28.6 new units per 1000 residents. The vacancy rate for the municipality, in 2011, was 0.79%.

The historical population is given in the following chart:

== Heritage sites of national significance ==
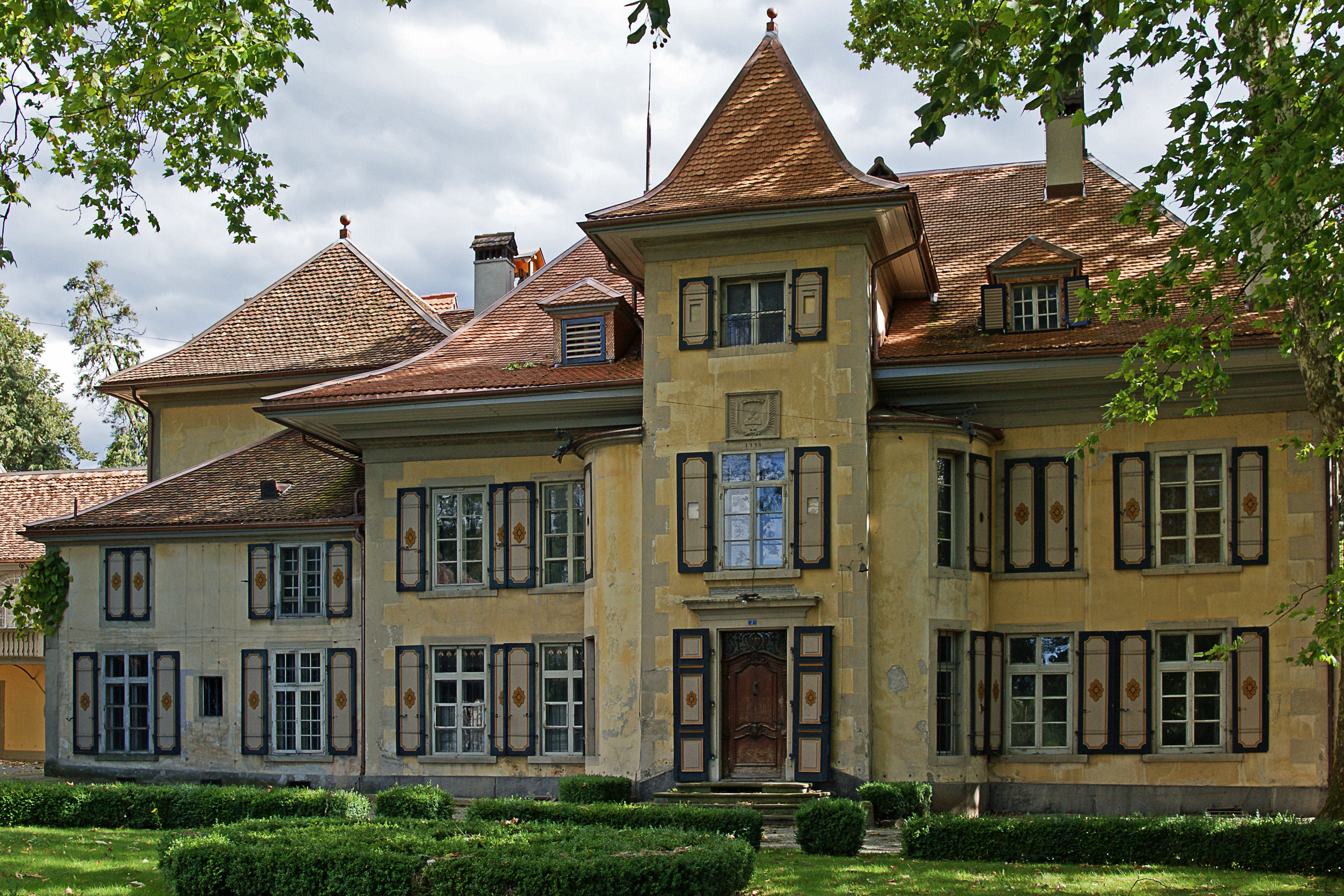
Kiesen Castle part of the Schlossgut or castle property

The Schlossgut is listed as a Swiss heritage site of national significance.

== Politics ==
In the 2015 federal election the most popular party was the Swiss People's Party (SVP) which received 33.1% of the vote. The next three most popular parties were the Conservative Democratic Party (BDP) (15.8%), the Social Democratic Party (SP) (12.3%) and the Green Liberal Party (GLP) (5.8%). In the federal election the voter turnout was 48.97%.

== Economy ==
As of 2011, Kiesen had an unemployment rate of 0.86%. As of 2012, there were a total of 398 people employed in the municipality. Of these, there were 34 people employed in the primary economic sector and about 12 businesses involved in this sector. 66 people were employed in the secondary sector and there were 11 businesses in this sector. 298 people were employed in the tertiary sector, with 41 businesses in this sector.

In 2008 there were a total of 190 full-time equivalent jobs. The number of jobs in the primary sector was 24, all of which were in agriculture. The number of jobs in the secondary sector was 95 of which 84 or (88.4%) were in manufacturing and 8 (8.4%) were in construction. The number of jobs in the tertiary sector was 71. In the tertiary sector; 14 or 19.7% were in wholesale or retail sales or the repair of motor vehicles, 2 or 2.8% were in the movement and storage of goods, 19 or 26.8% were in a hotel or restaurant, 1 was in the information industry, 16 or 22.5% were technical professionals or scientists, 8 or 11.3% were in education and 2 or 2.8% were in health care.

In 2000, there were 158 workers who commuted into the municipality and 311 workers who commuted away. The municipality is a net exporter of workers, with about 2.0 workers leaving the municipality for every one entering. Of the working population, 25.1% used public transportation to get to work, and 47.7% used a private car.

== Religion ==
From the 2000 census, 560 or 75.5% belonged to the Swiss Reformed Church, while 85 or 11.5% were Roman Catholic. Of the rest of the population, there were 3 members of an Orthodox church (or about 0.40% of the population), and there were 64 individuals (or about 8.63% of the population) who belonged to another Christian church. There were 10 (or about 1.35% of the population) who were Islamic. 41 (or about 5.53% of the population) belonged to no church, are agnostic or atheist, and 11 individuals (or about 1.48% of the population) did not answer the question.

== Climate ==
Between 1981 and 2010 Kiesen had an average of 128.2 days of rain or snow per year and on average received 1,018 mm (40.1 in) of precipitation. The wettest month was August during which time Kiesen received an average of 128 mm (5.0 in) of rain or snow. During this month there was precipitation for an average of 11.7 days. The month with the most days of precipitation was May, with an average of 13.1, but with only 116 mm (4.6 in) of rain or snow. The driest month of the year was February with an average of 49 mm (1.9 in) of precipitation over 8.7 days.

== Education ==
In Kiesen about 330 or (44.5%) of the population have completed non-mandatory upper secondary education, and 106 or (14.3%) have completed additional higher education (either university or a Fachhochschule). Of the 106 who completed tertiary schooling, 67.0% were Swiss men, 26.4% were Swiss women, 4.7% were non-Swiss men.

The Canton of Bern school system provides one year of non-obligatory Kindergarten, followed by six years of Primary school. This is followed by three years of obligatory lower Secondary school where the students are separated according to ability and aptitude. Following the lower Secondary students may attend additional schooling or they may enter an apprenticeship.

During the 2010–11 school year, there were a total of 81 students attending classes in Kiesen. There was one kindergarten class with a total of 11 students in the municipality. The municipality had 4 primary classes and 70 students. Of the primary students, 1.4% have a different mother language than the classroom language.

As of 2000, there were 20 students in Kiesen who came from another municipality, while 53 residents attended schools outside the municipality.

Kiesen is home to the Gemeindebibliothek Kiesen (municipal library of Kiesen). The library has (as of 2008) 4,471 books or other media. It was open a total of 160 days with average of 5 hours per week during that year.
