= Gelterfingen =

- Former municipality
- Flag Coat of arms
- Location of Gelterfingen
- Location within Switzerland Location within Canton of Bern
- Coordinates: 46°50′N 7°31′E
- Country: Switzerland
- Canton: Bern
- District: Bern-Mittelland

Area
  - Total: 3.5 km^{2} (1.4 sq mi)
- Elevation: 552 m (1,811 ft)

Population (Dec 2011)
  - Total: 243
  - Density: 69/km^{2} (180/sq mi)
- Time zone: UTC+01:00 (CET)
  - Summer (DST): UTC+02:00 (CEST)
- Postal code: 3126
- SFOS number: 865
- ISO 3166 code: CH-BE
- Surrounded by: Belpberg, Gerzensee, Kaufdorf, Kirchenthurnen, Mühledorf, Rümligen, Toffen
- Website: www.gelterfingen.ch

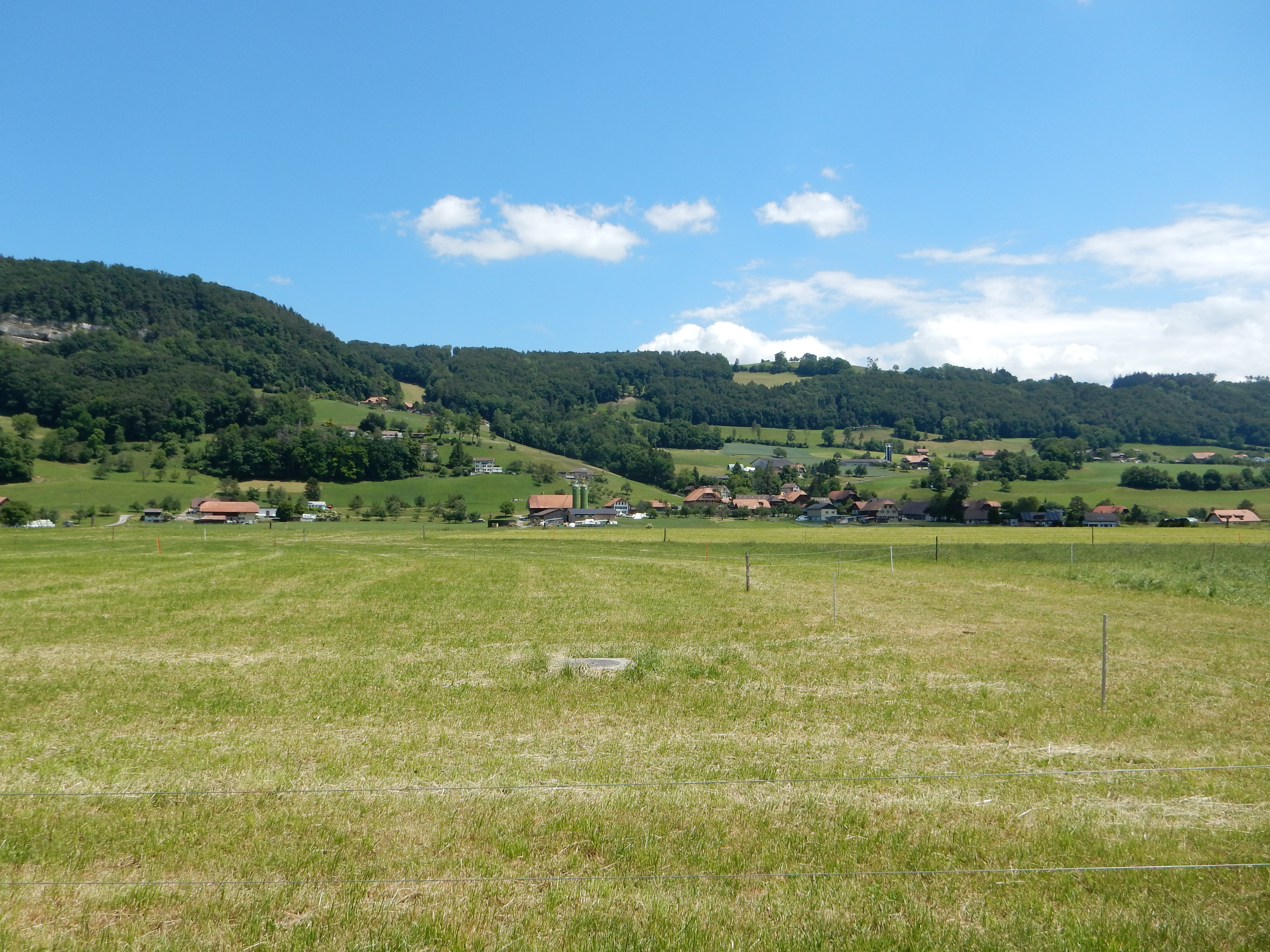
Gelterfingen

Gelterfingen is a former municipality in the Bern-Mittelland administrative district in the canton of Bern in Switzerland. On 1 January 2018 the former municipalities of Gelterfingen, Mühledorf and Noflen merged into the municipality of Kirchdorf.

== History ==
Gelterfingen is first mentioned in 1345 as Geltolfingen.

The oldest trace of a settlement in the area are several Hallstatt graves which were discovered at Hole. During the Middle Ages Gelterfingen was owned by the Freiherr von Kramburg. In 1373 it was acquired by the Knights Hospitaller at Münchenbuchsee Commandery. In 1528, Bern adopted the new faith of the Protestant Reformation, secularized the Commandery and acquired all its lands including Gelterfingen. Under Bernese control it was combined into a court with Kramburg and placed into the Seftigen district.

The swampy valley floor of the Gürbetal forced the village farmers to raise their crops on the surrounding hills. The valley floor was only used as a pasture. The Gürbe and Müsche river correction projects (1855–1911) and a drainage project in (1942–51) opened up rich farm land on the valley floor. The construction of a station on the Gürbetal Railroad in the village helped open up the village. Today the about half of the working residents commute to jobs outside the municipality. The main industry in the municipality is cabbage cultivation and other farming.

== Geography ==
Gelterfingen has an area of 3.5 km^{2} (1.35 sq mi). As of 2012, a total of 2.42 km^{2} (0.93 mi^{2}) or 69.3% is used for agricultural purposes, while 0.84 km^{2} (0.32 mi^{2}) or 24.1% is forested. The rest of the municipality is 0.19 km^{2} (0.073 mi^{2}) or 5.4% is settled (buildings or roads), 0.02 km^{2} (4.9 acres) or 0.6% is either rivers or lakes.

During the same year, housing and buildings made up 2.9% and transportation infrastructure made up 2.0%. A total of 22.1% of the total land area is heavily forested and 2.0% is covered with orchards or small clusters of trees. Of the agricultural land, 39.8% is used for growing crops and 27.8% is pasturage, while 1.7% is used for orchards or vine crops. All the water in the municipality is flowing water.

The municipality is located in the Gürbetal on the south-west slope of Belpberg mountain. It consists of the village of Gelterfingen and the hamlets of Kramburg and Eggenhorn.

The municipalities of Gelterfingen, Gerzensee, Kirchdorf, Mühledorf and Noflen are considering a merger on 1 January 2017 into the new municipality with an, as of 2014, undetermined name.

On 31 December 2009 Amtsbezirk Seftigen, the municipality's former district, was dissolved. On the following day, 1 January 2010, it joined the newly created Verwaltungskreis Bern-Mittelland.

== Coat of arms ==
The blazon of the municipal coat of arms is Per pale Gules and Argent a Mount of ten Coupeaux floatant counterchanged.

== Demographics ==
Gelterfingen has a population (as of December 2020) of 286. As of 2011, 2.9% of the population are resident foreign nationals. Over the last year (2010–2011) the population has changed at a rate of -1.2%. Migration accounted for -2.0%, while births and deaths accounted for 0.0%.

Most of the population (as of 2000) speaks German (247 or 98.8%) as their first language, Italian is the second most common (1 or 0.4%) and Portuguese is the third (1 or 0.4%).

As of 2008, the population was 51.2% male and 48.8% female. The population was made up of 121 Swiss men (49.2% of the population) and 5 (2.0%) non-Swiss men. There were 116 Swiss women (47.2%) and 4 (1.6%) non-Swiss women. Of the population in the municipality, 101 or about 40.4% were born in Gelterfingen and lived there in 2000. There were 122 or 48.8% who were born in the same canton, while 14 or 5.6% were born somewhere else in Switzerland, and 6 or 2.4% were born outside of Switzerland.

As of 2011, children and teenagers (0–19 years old) make up 12.3% of the population, while adults (20–64 years old) make up 63.8% and seniors (over 64 years old) make up 23.9%.

As of 2000, there were 98 people who were single and never married in the municipality. There were 119 married individuals, 19 widows or widowers and 14 individuals who are divorced.

As of 2010, there were 45 households that consist of only one person and 4 households with five or more people. In 2000, a total of 107 apartments (88.4% of the total) were permanently occupied, while 13 apartments (10.7%) were seasonally occupied and one apartment was empty. As of 2010, the construction rate of new housing units was 4.1 new units per 1000 residents. The vacancy rate for the municipality, in 2010, was 1.4%. In 2011, single family homes made up 29.6% of the total housing in the municipality.

The historical population is given in the following chart:

== Politics ==
In the 2011 federal election the most popular party was the Swiss People's Party (SVP) which received 54.9% of the vote. The next three most popular parties were the Conservative Democratic Party (BDP) (17.2%), the Social Democratic Party (SP) (15.8%) and another local party (4.7%). In the federal election, a total of 128 votes were cast, and the voter turnout was 59.3%.

== Economy ==
As of 2011, Gelterfingen had an unemployment rate of 1.21%. As of 2008, there were a total of 78 people employed in the municipality. Of these, there were 43 people employed in the primary economic sector and about 16 businesses involved in this sector. 20 people were employed in the secondary sector and there were 3 businesses in this sector. 15 people were employed in the tertiary sector, with 7 businesses in this sector. There were 137 residents of the municipality who were employed in some capacity, of which females made up 44.5% of the workforce.

In 2008 there were a total of 51 full-time equivalent jobs. The number of jobs in the primary sector was 25, all of which were in agriculture. The number of jobs in the secondary sector was 16 of which 6 or (37.5%) were in manufacturing and 3 (18.8%) were in construction. The number of jobs in the tertiary sector was 10. In the tertiary sector; 9 or 90.0% were in wholesale or retail sales or the repair of motor vehicles, and 1 was in health care.

In 2000, there were 25 workers who commuted into the municipality and 86 workers who commuted away. The municipality is a net exporter of workers, with about 3.4 workers leaving the municipality for every one entering. A total of 51 workers (67.1% of the 76 total workers in the municipality) both lived and worked in Gelterfingen. Of the working population, 16.8% used public transportation to get to work, and 45.3% used a private car.

In 2011 the average local and cantonal tax rate on a married resident, with two children, of Gelterfingen making 150,000 CHF was 12%, while an unmarried resident's rate was 17.6%. For comparison, the average rate for the entire canton in the same year, was 14.2% and 22.0%, while the nationwide average was 12.3% and 21.1% respectively.

In 2009 there were a total of 130 tax payers in the municipality. Of that total, 12 made over 75,000 CHF per year. The greatest number of workers, 48, made between 50,000 and 75,000 CHF per year. The average income of the over 75,000 CHF group in Gelterfingen was 107,158 CHF, while the average across all of Switzerland was 130,478 CHF.

In 2011 a total of 1.2% of the population received direct financial assistance from the government.

== Religion ==
From the 2000 census, 196 or 78.4% belonged to the Swiss Reformed Church, while 11 or 4.4% were Roman Catholic. Of the rest of the population, there were 23 individuals (or about 9.20% of the population) who belonged to another Christian church. 14 (or about 5.60% of the population) belonged to no church, are agnostic or atheist, and 6 individuals (or about 2.40% of the population) did not answer the question.

== Education ==
In Gelterfingen about 57.6% of the population have completed non-mandatory upper secondary education, and 10.8% have completed additional higher education (either university or a Fachhochschule). Of the 15 who had completed some form of tertiary schooling listed in the census, 66.7% were Swiss men, 26.7% were Swiss women.

As of 2000, there were a total of 25 students attending any school in the municipality. Of those, 23 both lived and attended school in the municipality, while 2 students came from another municipality. During the same year, 15 residents attended schools outside the municipality.
