= Mühledorf, Bern =

Mühledorf
- Former municipality
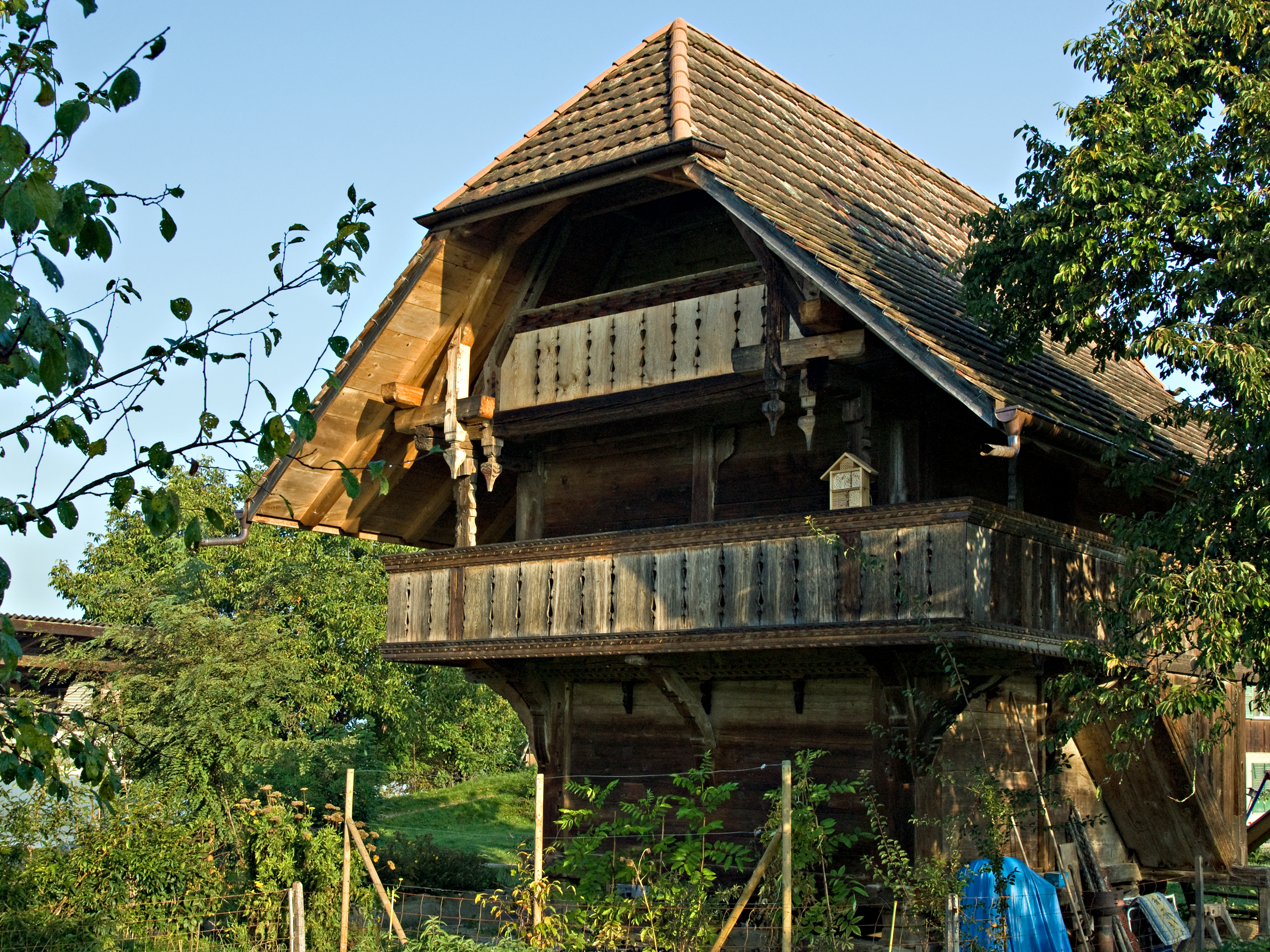

- Flag Coat of arms
- Location of Mühledorf
- Location within Switzerland Location within Canton of Bern
- Coordinates: 46°50′N 7°32′E
- Country: Switzerland
- Canton: Bern
- District: Bern-Mittelland

Government
  - Mayor: Eric von Graffenried

Area
  - Total: 2.3 km^{2} (0.89 sq mi)
- Elevation: 605 m (1,985 ft)

Population (Dec 2012)
  - Total: 258
  - Density: 110/km^{2} (290/sq mi)
- Time zone: UTC+01:00 (CET)
  - Summer (DST): UTC+02:00 (CEST)
- Postal code: 3116
- SFOS number: 875
- ISO 3166 code: CH-BE
- Surrounded by: Gelterfingen, Gerzensee, Kirchdorf, Kirchenthurnen, Mühlethurnen
- Website: www.muehledorf-be.ch

Mühledorf is a former municipality in the Bern-Mittelland administrative district in the canton of Bern in Switzerland. On 1 January 2018 the former municipalities of Gelterfingen, Mühledorf and Noflen merged into the municipality of Kirchdorf.

== History ==
Mühledorf is first mentioned in 1364 as Mülidorf.

During the Middle Ages the village was part of the barony of Kramburg. In 1373 the village was donated to the Münchenbuchsee Commandery. In 1528, Bern accepted the new faith of the Protestant Reformation and suppressed the Commandery. Mühledorf came under Bernese rule and in 1533 was assigned to the court of Gelterfingen in the district of Seftigen created. The village has always been part of the parish of Kirchdorf.

The Gürbe and Müsche river projects of 1855-1911 drained the swampy valley floor and opened up farmland. It also made it possible to build roads to Belp and Rümligen. Today, agriculture is still the main industry. However, around two-thirds of the work force commute to jobs in nearby towns and cities.

== Geography ==
Mühledorf has an area of 2.29 km^{2} (0.88 sq mi). As of 2012, a total of 2 km^{2} (0.77 mi^{2}) or 87.7% is used for agricultural purposes, while 0.12 km^{2} (0.046 mi^{2}) or 5.3% is forested. The rest of the municipality is 0.16 km^{2} (0.062 mi^{2}) or 7.0% is settled (buildings or roads), 0.01 km^{2} (2.5 acres) or 0.4% is either rivers or lakes.

During the same year, housing and buildings made up 5.3% and transportation infrastructure made up 1.8%. All of the forested land area is covered with heavy forests. Of the agricultural land, 65.4% is used for growing crops and 20.2% is pasturage, while 2.2% is used for orchards or vine crops. All the water in the municipality is flowing water.

The entire municipality and the village of Mühledorf are located on a terrace above the Gürbetal (Gürbe valley) and stretching to Gerzensee lake.

The municipalities of Gelterfingen, Gerzensee, Kirchdorf, Mühledorf (BE) and Noflen are considering a merger on 1 January 2017 into the new municipality with an, as of 2014, undetermined name.

On 31 December 2009 Amtsbezirk Seftigen, the municipality's former district, was dissolved. On the following day, 1 January 2010, it joined the newly created Verwaltungskreis Bern-Mittelland.

== Coat of arms ==
The blazon of the municipal coat of arms is Per chevron enbowed Gules and Argent and in the first a Mill Wheel of the second.

== Demographics ==
Mühledorf has a population (as of December 2020) of 264. As of 2012, 3.9% of the population are resident foreign nationals. Over the last 2 years (2010-2012) the population has changed at a rate of 11.2%. Migration accounted for 9.5%, while births and deaths accounted for 4.3%.

Most of the population (as of 2000) speaks German (178 or 97.3%) as their first language, French is the second most common (2 or 1.1%) and Romansh is the third (2 or 1.1%).

As of 2008, the population was 52.2% male and 47.8% female. The population was made up of 118 Swiss men (50.9% of the population) and 3 (1.3%) non-Swiss men. There were 108 Swiss women (46.6%) and 3 (1.3%) non-Swiss women. Of the population in the municipality, 59 or about 32.2% were born in Mühledorf and lived there in 2000. There were 89 or 48.6% who were born in the same canton, while 26 or 14.2% were born somewhere else in Switzerland, and 4 or 2.2% were born outside of Switzerland.

As of 2012, children and teenagers (0–19 years old) make up 25.2% of the population, while adults (20–64 years old) make up 60.1% and seniors (over 64 years old) make up 14.7%.

As of 2000, there were 74 people who were single and never married in the municipality. There were 94 married individuals, 10 widows or widowers and 5 individuals who are divorced.

As of 2010, there were 12 households that consist of only one person and 8 households with five or more people. In 2000, a total of 68 apartments (87.2% of the total) were permanently occupied, while 6 apartments (7.7%) were seasonally occupied and 4 apartments (5.1%) were empty. In 2011, single family homes made up 43.8% of the total housing in the municipality.

The historical population is given in the following chart:

== Heritage sites of national significance ==
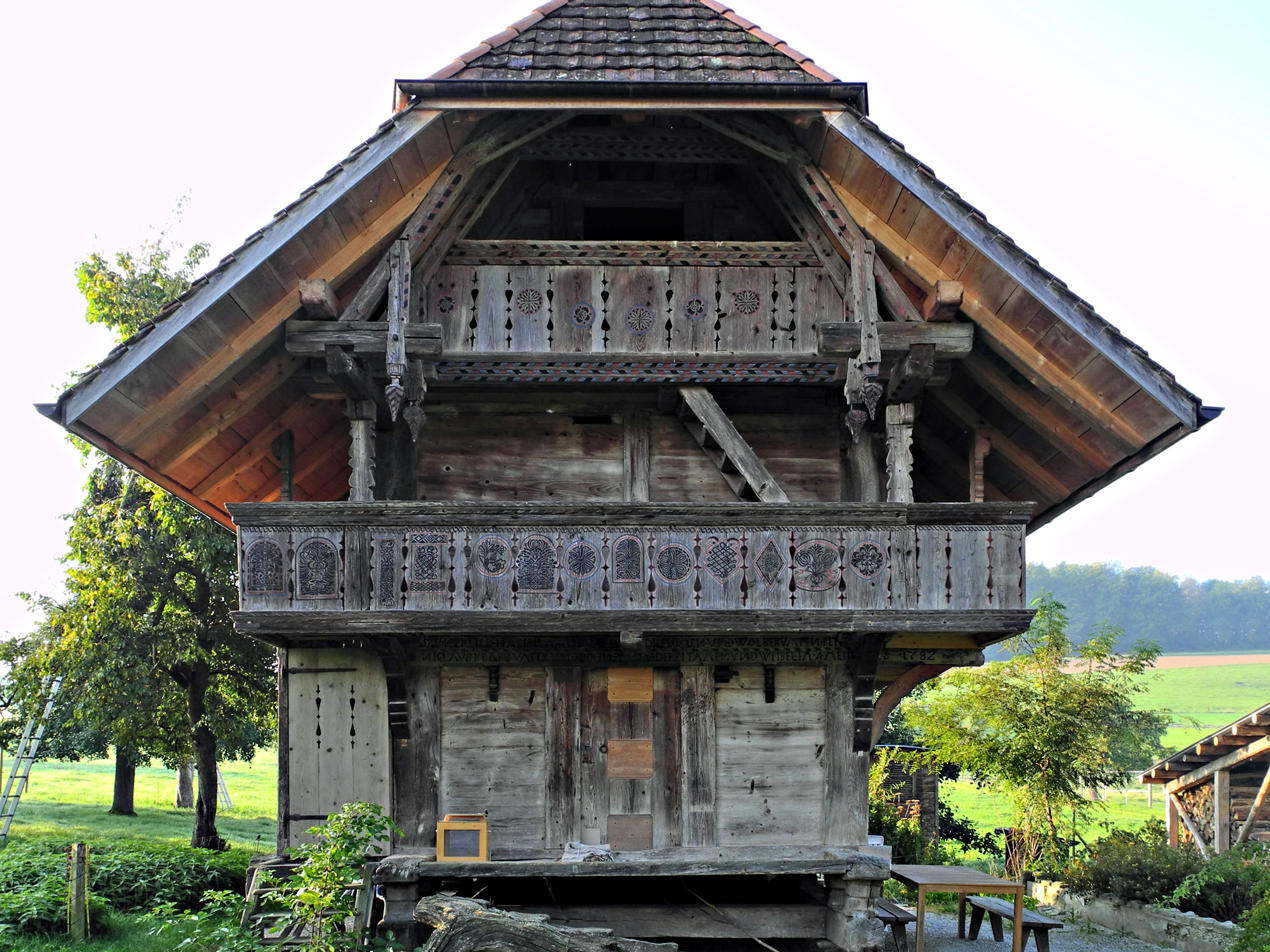
Granary

The granary at Filgesse 31 is listed as a Swiss heritage site of national significance.

== Politics ==
In the 2011 federal election the most popular party was the Swiss People's Party (SVP) which received 38.1% of the vote. The next three most popular parties were the Conservative Democratic Party (BDP) (21.7%), the Green Liberal Party (GLP) (13.1%) and the Christian Social Party (CSP) (13.0%). In the federal election, a total of 117 votes were cast, and the voter turnout was 66.9%.

== Economy ==
As of 2011, Mühledorf had an unemployment rate of 0.82%. As of 2011, there were a total of 57 people employed in the municipality. Of these, there were 26 people employed in the primary economic sector and about 11 businesses involved in this sector. 5 people were employed in the secondary sector and there were 2 businesses in this sector. 26 people were employed in the tertiary sector, with 4 businesses in this sector. There were 110 residents of the municipality who were employed in some capacity, of which females made up 39.1% of the workforce.

In 2008 there were a total of 42 full-time equivalent jobs. The number of jobs in the primary sector was 17, all of which were in agriculture. The number of jobs in the secondary sector was 8 of which 6 or (75.0%) were in manufacturing and 3 (37.5%) were in construction. The number of jobs in the tertiary sector was 17. In the tertiary sector; 7 or 41.2% were in wholesale or retail sales or the repair of motor vehicles, 9 or 52.9% were in a hotel or restaurant, 1 was in education.

In 2000, there were 15 workers who commuted into the municipality and 75 workers who commuted away. The municipality is a net exporter of workers, with about 5.0 workers leaving the municipality for every one entering. A total of 35 workers (70.0% of the 50 total workers in the municipality) both lived and worked in Mühledorf. Of the working population, 11.8% used public transportation to get to work, and 51.8% used a private car.

In 2011 the average local and cantonal tax rate on a married resident, with two children, of Mühledorf making 150,000 CHF was 11.3%, while an unmarried resident's rate was 16.7%. For comparison, the average rate for the entire canton in the same year, was 14.2% and 22.0%, while the nationwide average was 12.3% and 21.1% respectively.

In 2009 there were a total of 93 tax payers in the municipality. Of that total, 39 made over 75,000 CHF per year. The average income of the over 75,000 CHF group in Mühledorf was 141,549 CHF, while the average across all of Switzerland was 130,478 CHF.

== Religion ==
From the 2000 census, 155 or 84.7% belonged to the Swiss Reformed Church, while 2 or 1.1% were Roman Catholic. Of the rest of the population, there were 9 individuals (or about 4.92% of the population) who belonged to another Christian church. There were 2 (or about 1.09% of the population) who were Muslim. 13 (or about 7.10% of the population) belonged to no church, are agnostic or atheist, and 2 individuals (or about 1.09% of the population) did not answer the question.

== Education ==
In Mühledorf about 67.6% of the population have completed non-mandatory upper secondary education, and 21.3% have completed additional higher education (either university or a Fachhochschule). Of the 28 who had completed some form of tertiary schooling listed in the census, 78.6% were Swiss men, 14.3% were Swiss women.

The Canton of Bern school system provides one year of non-obligatory Kindergarten, followed by six years of Primary school. This is followed by three years of obligatory lower Secondary school where the students are separated according to ability and aptitude. Following the lower Secondary students may attend additional schooling or they may enter an apprenticeship.

During the 2011-12 school year, there were a total of 14 students attending classes in Mühledorf. There were no kindergarten classes in the municipality. The municipality had one primary class and 14 students. Of the primary students, 7.1% were permanent or temporary residents of Switzerland (not citizens) and 7.1% have a different mother language than the classroom language.

As of 2000, there were a total of 14 students attending any school in the municipality. Of those, 13 both lived and attended school in the municipality, while one student came from another municipality. During the same year, 11 residents attended schools outside the municipality.
