= Noflen =

- Former municipality
- Flag Coat of arms
- Location of Noflen
- Location within Switzerland Location within Canton of Bern
- Coordinates: 46°48′N 7°33′E
- Country: Switzerland
- Canton: Bern
- District: Bern-Mittelland

Government
  - Mayor: Fritz Dähler

Area
  - Total: 2.7 km^{2} (1.0 sq mi)
- Elevation: 630 m (2,070 ft)

Population (Dec 2012)
  - Total: 286
  - Density: 110/km^{2} (270/sq mi)
- Time zone: UTC+01:00 (CET)
  - Summer (DST): UTC+02:00 (CEST)
- Postal code: 3116
- SFOS number: 878
- ISO 3166 code: CH-BE
- Surrounded by: Burgistein, Kienersrüti, Kirchdorf, Seftigen, Uetendorf
- Website: www.thun-west.ch/region/noflen_09.htm

Noflen is a former municipality in the Bern-Mittelland administrative district in the canton of Bern in Switzerland. On 1 January 2018 the former municipalities of Gelterfingen, Mühledorf and Noflen merged into the municipality of Kirchdorf.

== History ==
Noflen is first mentioned in 1250 as Novelon.

Very little is known about the early history of the village. By the 13th and 14th centuries a number of monasteries and patrician families owned rights or land in Noflen. The monasteries probably expanded their power in the village over the following centuries. However, in 1528 Bern adopted the new faith of the Protestant Reformation and forcibly secularized monastery lands. Most likely this is when Noflen was acquired by Bern. The village has always been part of the parish of Kirchdorf. Today the residents of the village mostly raise dairy cattle and farm.

== Geography ==
Noflen has an area of 2.71 km^{2} (1.05 sq mi). As of 2012, a total of 2.21 km^{2} (0.85 mi^{2}) or 81.3% is used for agricultural purposes, while 0.37 km^{2} (0.14 mi^{2}) or 13.6% is forested. The rest of the municipality is 0.16 km^{2} (0.062 mi^{2}) or 5.9% is settled (buildings or roads).

During the same year, housing and buildings made up 3.7% and transportation infrastructure made up 2.2%. All of the forested land area is covered with heavy forests. Of the agricultural land, 47.8% is used for growing crops and 26.8% is pasturage, while 6.6% is used for orchards or vine crops.

The municipality is a scattered settlement with an upper and lower village on the Terrasse above the Gürbetal (Gürbe valley), while part of the municipality is on the valley floor. Since 1948 the hamlet of Stoffelsrüti (in 1941 it had a population of 41) stopped being an exclave of Jaberg and joined Noflen.

The municipalities of Gelterfingen, Gerzensee, Kirchdorf, Mühledorf and Noflen are considering a merger on 1 January 2017 into the new municipality with an, as of 2014, undetermined name.

On 31 December 2009 Amtsbezirk Seftigen, the municipality's former district, was dissolved. On the following day, 1 January 2010, it joined the newly created Verwaltungskreis Bern-Mittelland.

== Coat of arms ==
The blazon of the municipal coat of arms is Argent a Rose Gules barbed and seeded proper between two Oxen orns of the second and a Mount Vert issuant from the base.

== Demographics ==
Noflen has a population (as of December 2020) of 299. As of 2012, 7.0% of the population are resident foreign nationals. Over the last 2 years (2010-2012) the population has changed at a rate of 11.7%. Migration accounted for 7.8%, while births and deaths accounted for 4.3%.

Most of the population (as of 2000) speaks German (246 or 99.2%) as their first language with the rest speaking Albanian.

As of 2008, the population was 51.2% male and 48.8% female. The population was made up of 124 Swiss men (48.4% of the population) and 7 (2.7%) non-Swiss men. There were 116 Swiss women (45.3%) and 9 (3.5%) non-Swiss women. Of the population in the municipality, 109 or about 44.0% were born in Noflen and lived there in 2000. There were 95 or 38.3% who were born in the same canton, while 32 or 12.9% were born somewhere else in Switzerland, and 5 or 2.0% were born outside of Switzerland.

As of 2012, children and teenagers (0–19 years old) make up 25.2% of the population, while adults (20–64 years old) make up 60.5% and seniors (over 64 years old) make up 14.3%.

As of 2000, there were 124 people who were single and never married in the municipality. There were 107 married individuals, 13 widows or widowers and 4 individuals who are divorced.

As of 2010, there were 22 households that consist of only one person and 10 households with five or more people. In 2000, a total of 89 apartments (89.9% of the total) were permanently occupied, while 6 apartments (6.1%) were seasonally occupied and 4 apartments (4.0%) were empty. As of 2012, the construction rate of new housing units was 35.0 new units per 1000 residents. The vacancy rate for the municipality, in 2013, was 2.4%. In 2011, single family homes made up 23.5% of the total housing in the municipality.

The historical population is given in the following chart:

== Economy ==
As of 2011, Noflen had an unemployment rate of 0.77%. As of 2011, there were a total of 124 people employed in the municipality. Of these, there were 88 people employed in the primary economic sector and about 24 businesses involved in this sector. 6 people were employed in the secondary sector and there were 3 businesses in this sector. 30 people were employed in the tertiary sector, with 10 businesses in this sector. There were 139 residents of the municipality who were employed in some capacity, of which females made up 41.7% of the workforce.

In 2008 there were a total of 83 full-time equivalent jobs. The number of jobs in the primary sector was 59, of which 58 were in agriculture and 1 was in forestry or lumber production. The number of jobs in the secondary sector was 14 of which 5 or (35.7%) were in manufacturing and 9 (64.3%) were in construction. The number of jobs in the tertiary sector was 10. In the tertiary sector; 4 or 40.0% were in wholesale or retail sales or the repair of motor vehicles, 4 or 40.0% were technical professionals or scientists, 2 or 20.0% were in education.

In 2000, there were 9 workers who commuted into the municipality and 84 workers who commuted away. The municipality is a net exporter of workers, with about 9.3 workers leaving the municipality for every one entering. A total of 55 workers (85.9% of the 64 total workers in the municipality) both lived and worked in Noflen. Of the working population, 7.9% used public transportation to get to work, and 49.6% used a private car.

In 2011 the average local and cantonal tax rate on a married resident, with two children, of Noflen making 150,000 CHF was 12.4%, while an unmarried resident's rate was 18.2%. For comparison, the average rate for the entire canton in the same year, was 14.2% and 22.0%, while the nationwide average was 12.3% and 21.1% respectively.

In 2009 there were a total of 104 tax payers in the municipality. Of that total, 27 made over 75,000 CHF per year. There was one person who made between 15,000 and 20,000 per year. The average income of the over 75,000 CHF group in Noflen was 97,026 CHF, while the average across all of Switzerland was 130,478 CHF.

In 2011 a total of 2.0% of the population received direct financial assistance from the government.

== Religion ==
From the 2000 census, 219 or 88.3% belonged to the Swiss Reformed Church, while 5 or 2.0% were Roman Catholic. Of the rest of the population, there were 5 individuals (or about 2.02% of the population) who belonged to another Christian church. There were 5 (or about 2.02% of the population) who were Muslim. 6 (or about 2.42% of the population) belonged to no church, are agnostic or atheist, and 8 individuals (or about 3.23% of the population) did not answer the question.

== Education ==
In Noflen about 57.7% of the population have completed non-mandatory upper secondary education, and 19.2% have completed additional higher education (either university or a Fachhochschule). Of the 26 who had completed some form of tertiary schooling listed in the census, 73.1% were Swiss men, 26.9% were Swiss women.

The Canton of Bern school system provides one year of non-obligatory Kindergarten, followed by six years of Primary school. This is followed by three years of obligatory lower Secondary school where the students are separated according to ability and aptitude. Following the lower Secondary students may attend additional schooling or they may enter an apprenticeship.

During the 2011-12 school year, there were a total of 20 students attending 2 kindergarten classes in Noflen.

As of 2000, there were a total of 26 students attending any school in the municipality. Of those, 26 both lived and attended school in the municipality, while 8 students from Noflen attended schools outside the municipality. During the same year, 8 residents attended schools outside the municipality.
