= Gerzensee (lake) =

Lake in Bern, Switzerland

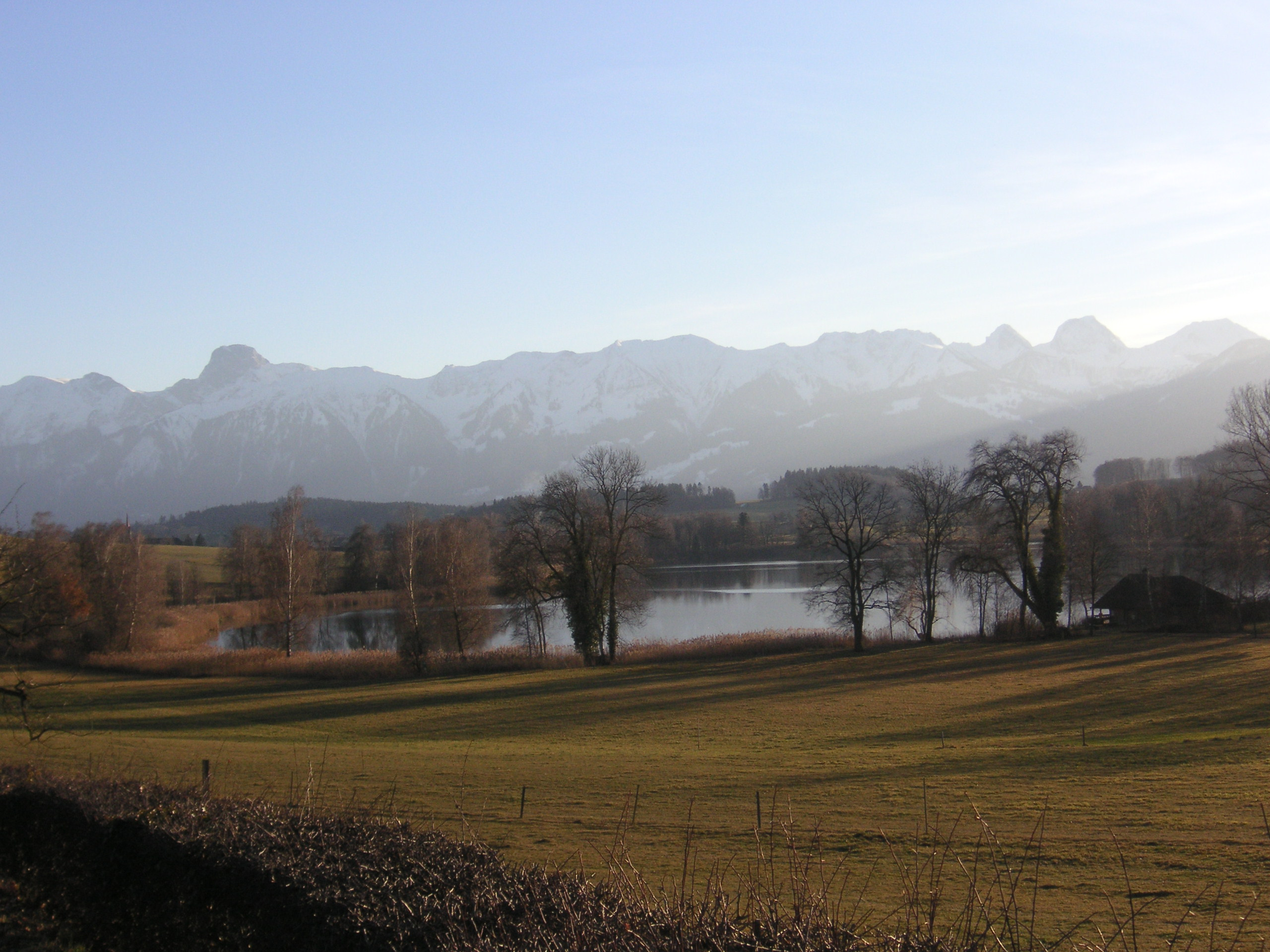

- Location within Canton of Bern Location within Switzerland Location within Alps
- Interactive map of Gerzensee
- Location: Canton of Bern
- Coordinates: 46°49′48″N 7°32′48″E
- Basin countries: Switzerland
- Surface area: 25.16 ha (62.2 acres)
- Max. depth: 11 m (36 ft)
- Surface elevation: 603 m (1,978 ft)
- Settlements: Gerzensee

Gerzensee is a lake in canton of Bern, Switzerland. Its surface area is 25 ha (62 acres).

It gives the name to the village of Gerzensee.
