= Thurn =

Thurn may refer to:

- Thurn, Austria, a town near Lienz, Tyrol
- Thurn Pass, an Alpine mountain pass in Austria
- Thurn und Taxis, a historical noble house

== See also ==
- Turn (disambiguation)
- Thurm
- Thurnen (disambiguation)
- Thurnberg
