= Thurnen =

Thurnen may refer to:

- Kirchenthurnen, known as Thurnen until 1860, a village in the canton of Bern, Switzerland
- Thürnen, a municipality in the canton of Baselland, Switzerland
- Thurnen, Bern, a municipality in Switzerland
