= Thurnen, Bern =

Thurnen
- Municipality
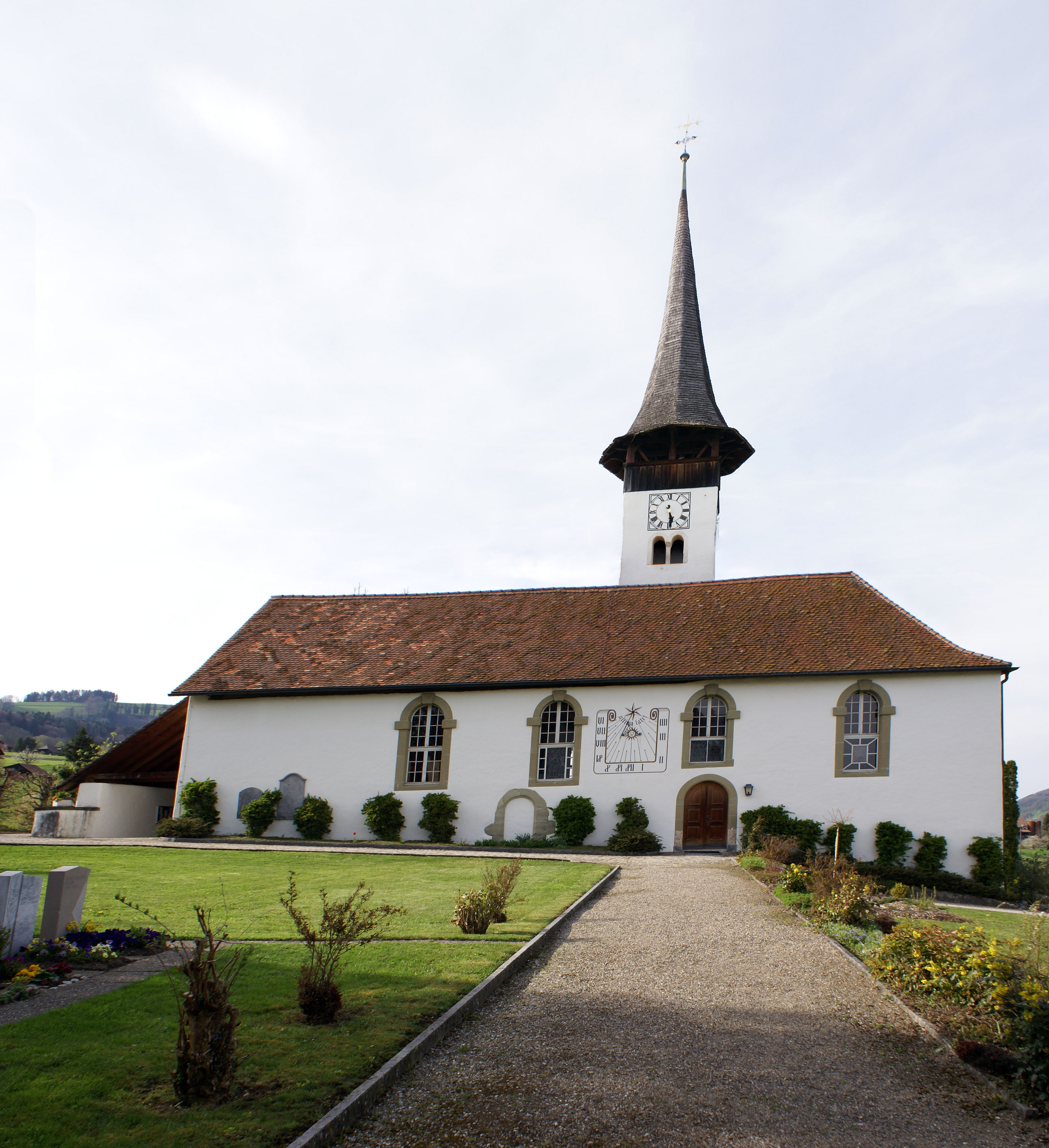

- Flag Coat of arms
- Location of Thurnen
- Location within Switzerland Location within Canton of Bern
- Coordinates: 46°49′N 7°30′E
- Country: Switzerland
- Canton: Bern
- District: Bern-Mittelland

Government
  - Executive: Gemeinderat with 7 members
  - Mayor: Gemeindepräsident(in); Vacant (as of 2026)

Area
  - Total: 595 km^{2} (230 sq mi)

Population (December 2020)
  - Total: 2,035
  - Density: 3.42/km^{2} (8.86/sq mi)
- Time zone: UTC+01:00 (CET)
  - Summer (DST): UTC+02:00 (CEST)
- Postal code: 3127, 3128
- SFOS number: 889
- ISO 3166 code: CH-BE
- Surrounded by: Gelterfingen, Mühledorf, Riggisberg, Rümligen
- Website: www.thurnen.ch

Thurnen is a municipality in the Bern-Mittelland administrative district in the canton of Bern in Switzerland. On 1 January 2020 the former municipalities of Kirchenthurnen, Lohnstorf and Mühlethurnen merged to form the new municipality of Thurnen.

== History ==
=== Kirchenthurnen ===
Kirchenthurnen is first mentioned in 1228 as Tornes. Until 1860 it was known as Thurnen. The name was changed to prevent confusion with the municipality of Mühlethurnen.

The oldest trace of a settlement in the area are several Hallstatt era graves discovered at the Ried gravel pit. By the 14th century the village was owned by the von Blankenburg family from Bern The village church was first mentioned in 1228. In 1343 the village, church and surrounding lands were donated by the Blankenburgs to Interlaken Monastery. In 1528 Bern adopted the new faith of the Protestant Reformation and forcefully secularized Interlaken Monastery. This brought Kirchenthurnen under Bernese rule and it became the center of the bailiwick of Thurnen, though in the 18th century it moved to Mühlethurnen.

In the 19th century the population began to grow for a while, though it dropped after 1880. In the 1960s it grew again as Bern expanded and commuters moved into more distant communities. By 2000, about two-thirds of the working population commute to jobs outside the municipality.

=== Lohnstorf ===
Lohnstorf is first mentioned in 1148 as Lonestrof. In 1279 it was mentioned as Lonstorf.

The oldest trace of a settlement is in Brühl, where the ruins of a Roman era settlement were found. By the 13th-14th century a number of Bernese patrician families owned land and rights in the village and surrounding farms. One of the landowners was Anna Seiler, who established a hospital in Bern and in 1354 willed her landholdings to support the hospital. Today she is remembered with the Anna Seiler Fountain in Bern. In 1343, the von Blankenburg family donated Kirchenthurnen and the surrounding land, which probably included Lohnstorf, to Interlaken Monastery. In 1528 Bern accepted the new faith of the Protestant Reformation and forcibly secularized the monastery and its lands, including Lohnstorf.

Throughout its history, Lohnstorf has been part of the large parish of Thurnen which is centered in Kirchenthurnen.

The Gürbe river correction projects of 1855-1911 helped drain the marshy valley floor and opened up farmland. Today, agriculture is the major industry in the municipality, though about two-thirds of the work force commute to jobs in surrounding towns and cities. Students from Lohnstorf travel to the school in Mühlethurnen.

=== Mühlethurnen ===
The first mention of the village is in the 14th century when the von Blankenburg family owned land in it and in neighboring Kirchenthurnen. The family donated their lands and rights in 1343 and 1362 to Interlaken Monastery. In 1528, Bern accepted the new faith of the Protestant Reformation and forcefully secularized the monastery and all its lands. The village became part of the district and parish of Thurnen.

The Gürbe river correction projects from 1855 until 1911 drained the swampy valley floor and opened up additional farm land. In 1901 the Gürbetal railroad built a station in the municipality and connected it to the rest of the Swiss rail network. In the 1970s the population began to grow as Mühlethurnen became a regional center in the Gürbe valley. Today the residents work in agriculture, produce sauerkraut or in small businesses. About three-fourths of the work force commutes to jobs in nearby towns and cities.

A village school opened in Mühlethurnen in 1871. In 1912 it moved to Riggisberg. Today Mühlethurnen and Lohnstorf form a single school district, with the school in Mühlethurnen.

== Geography ==
After the merger, Thurnen has an area (as of the 2004/09 survey) of 5.95 km^{2} (2.30 sq mi).

== Demographics ==
The new municipality has a population (as of December 2020) of 2,035.

== Historic Population ==
The historical population is given in the following chart:
