= Mühlethurnen =

- Former municipality
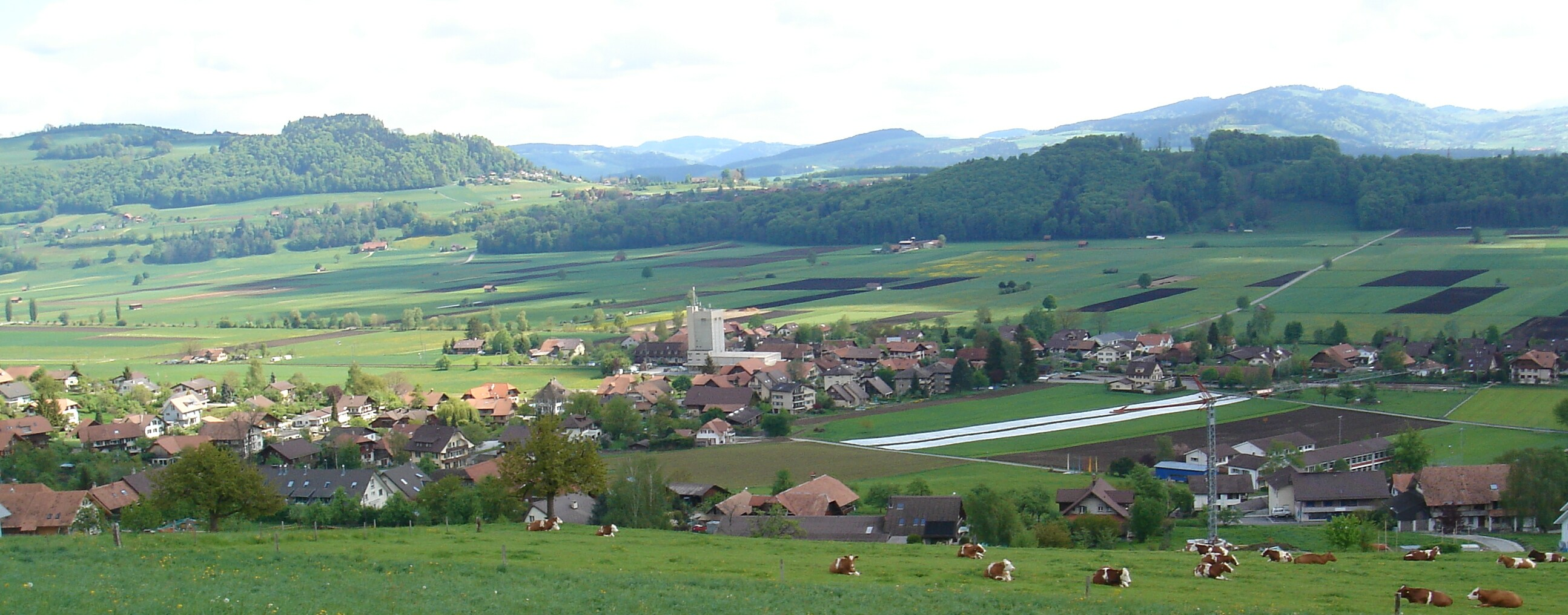

- Flag Coat of arms
- Location of Mühlethurnen
- Location within Switzerland Location within Canton of Bern
- Coordinates: 46°49′N 7°30′E
- Country: Switzerland
- Canton: Bern
- District: Bern-Mittelland

Government
  - Mayor: Christian Kneubühl

Area
  - Total: 2.9 km^{2} (1.1 sq mi)
- Elevation: 573 m (1,880 ft)

Population (Dec 2012)
  - Total: 1,372
  - Density: 470/km^{2} (1,200/sq mi)
- Time zone: UTC+01:00 (CET)
  - Summer (DST): UTC+02:00 (CEST)
- Postal code: 3127
- SFOS number: 876
- ISO 3166 code: CH-BE
- Surrounded by: Kirchdorf, Kirchenthurnen, Lohnstorf, Mühledorf, Riggisberg
- Website: www.muehlethurnen.ch

Mühlethurnen is a former municipality in the Bern-Mittelland administrative district in the canton of Bern in Switzerland. On 1 January 2020 the former municipalities of Kirchenthurnen, Lohnstorf and Mühlethurnen merged to form the municipality of Thurnen.

== History ==
The first mention of the village is in the 14th century when the von Blankenburg family owned land in it and in neighboring Kirchenthurnen. The family donated their lands and rights in 1343 and 1362 to Interlaken Monastery. In 1528, Bern accepted the new faith of the Protestant Reformation and forcefully secularized the monastery and all its lands. The village became part of the district and parish of Thurnen.

The Gürbe river correction projects from 1855 until 1911 drained the swampy valley floor and opened up additional farm land. In 1901 the Gürbetal railroad built a station in the municipality and connected it to the rest of the Swiss rail network. In the 1970s the population began to grow as Mühlethurnen became a regional center in the Gürbe valley. Today the residents work in agriculture, produce sauerkraut or in small businesses. About three-fourths of the work force commutes to jobs in nearby towns and cities.

A village school opened in Mühlethurnen in 1871. In 1912 it moved to Riggisberg. Today Mühlethurnen and Lohnstorf form a single school district, with the school in Mühlethurnen.

== Geography ==
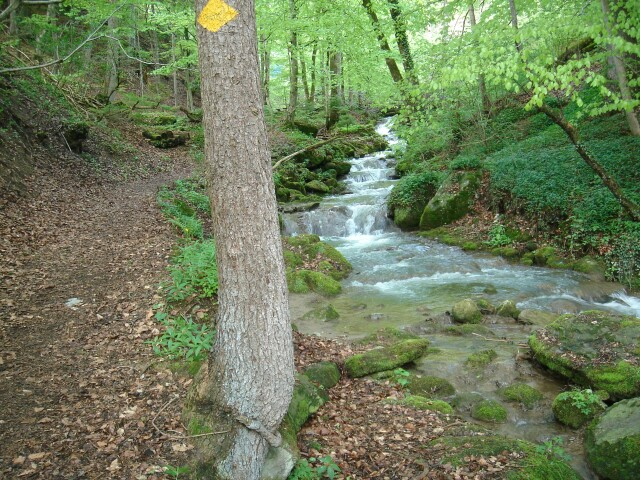
Mühlibach stream near Mühlethurnen

Mühlethurnen has an area of 2.93 km^{2} (1.13 sq mi). As of 2012, a total of 2.11 km^{2} (0.81 mi^{2}) or 72.0% is used for agricultural purposes, while 0.22 km^{2} (0.085 mi^{2}) or 7.5% is forested. The rest of the municipality is 0.57 km^{2} (0.22 mi^{2}) or 19.5% is settled (buildings or roads), 0.02 km^{2} (4.9 acres) or 0.7% is either rivers or lakes.

During the same year, housing and buildings made up 11.3% and transportation infrastructure made up 5.5%. Power and water infrastructure as well as other special developed areas made up 1.4% of the area All of the forested land area is covered with heavy forests. Of the agricultural land, 51.5% is used for growing crops and 19.1% is pasturage, while 1.4% is used for orchards or vine crops. All the water in the municipality is flowing water.

It is located in the Gürbetal (Gürbe valley) on the slope of Längenberg mountain. The municipality includes the village of Mühlethurnen, the hamlets of Mühlebach and Pontel-Freudberg and several isolated houses.

On 31 December 2009 Amtsbezirk Seftigen, the municipality's former district, was dissolved. On the following day, 1 January 2010, it joined the newly created Verwaltungskreis Bern-Mittelland.

== Coat of arms ==
The blazon of the municipal coat of arms is Gules a Tower embatteled Argent and a Base Semi Wheel of the same. Both the half mill wheel (German: halben Mühlrad) and the tower (German: Turm) are examples of canting arms.

== Demographics ==
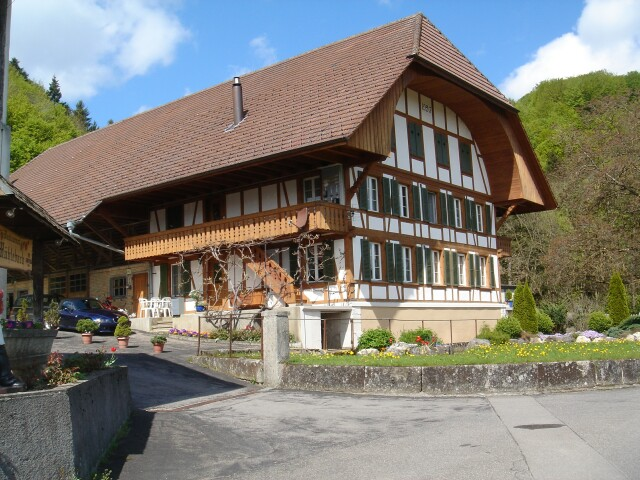
A traditional style house in Mühlethurnen

Mühlethurnen has a population (as of December 2020) of 1,426. As of 2012, 4.3% of the population are resident foreign nationals. Over the last 2 years (2010-2012) the population has changed at a rate of 1.0%. Migration accounted for 0.1%, while births and deaths accounted for 0.5%.

Most of the population (as of 2000) speaks German (1,247 or 96.7%) as their first language, French is the second most common (10 or 0.8%) and English is the third (4 or 0.3%).

As of 2008, the population was 48.9% male and 51.1% female. The population was made up of 634 Swiss men (46.7% of the population) and 31 (2.3%) non-Swiss men. There were 669 Swiss women (49.2%) and 25 (1.8%) non-Swiss women. Of the population in the municipality, 342 or about 26.5% were born in Mühlethurnen and lived there in 2000. There were 681 or 52.8% who were born in the same canton, while 144 or 11.2% were born somewhere else in Switzerland, and 74 or 5.7% were born outside of Switzerland.

As of 2012, children and teenagers (0–19 years old) make up 20.6% of the population, while adults (20–64 years old) make up 60.9% and seniors (over 64 years old) make up 18.4%.

As of 2000, there were 550 people who were single and never married in the municipality. There were 632 married individuals, 67 widows or widowers and 41 individuals who are divorced.

As of 2010, there were 162 households that consist of only one person and 38 households with five or more people. In 2000, a total of 499 apartments (94.0% of the total) were permanently occupied, while 17 apartments (3.2%) were seasonally occupied and 15 apartments (2.8%) were empty. The vacancy rate for the municipality, in 2013, was 2.8346456693%. In 2011, single family homes made up 62.1% of the total housing in the municipality.

The historical population is given in the following chart:

== Politics ==
In the 2011 federal election the most popular party was the Swiss People's Party (SVP) which received 25.4% of the vote. The next three most popular parties were the Social Democratic Party (SP) (18.0%), the Conservative Democratic Party (BDP) (15.8%) and the Green Party (14.1%). In the federal election, a total of 679 votes were cast, and the voter turnout was 62.3%.

== Economy ==
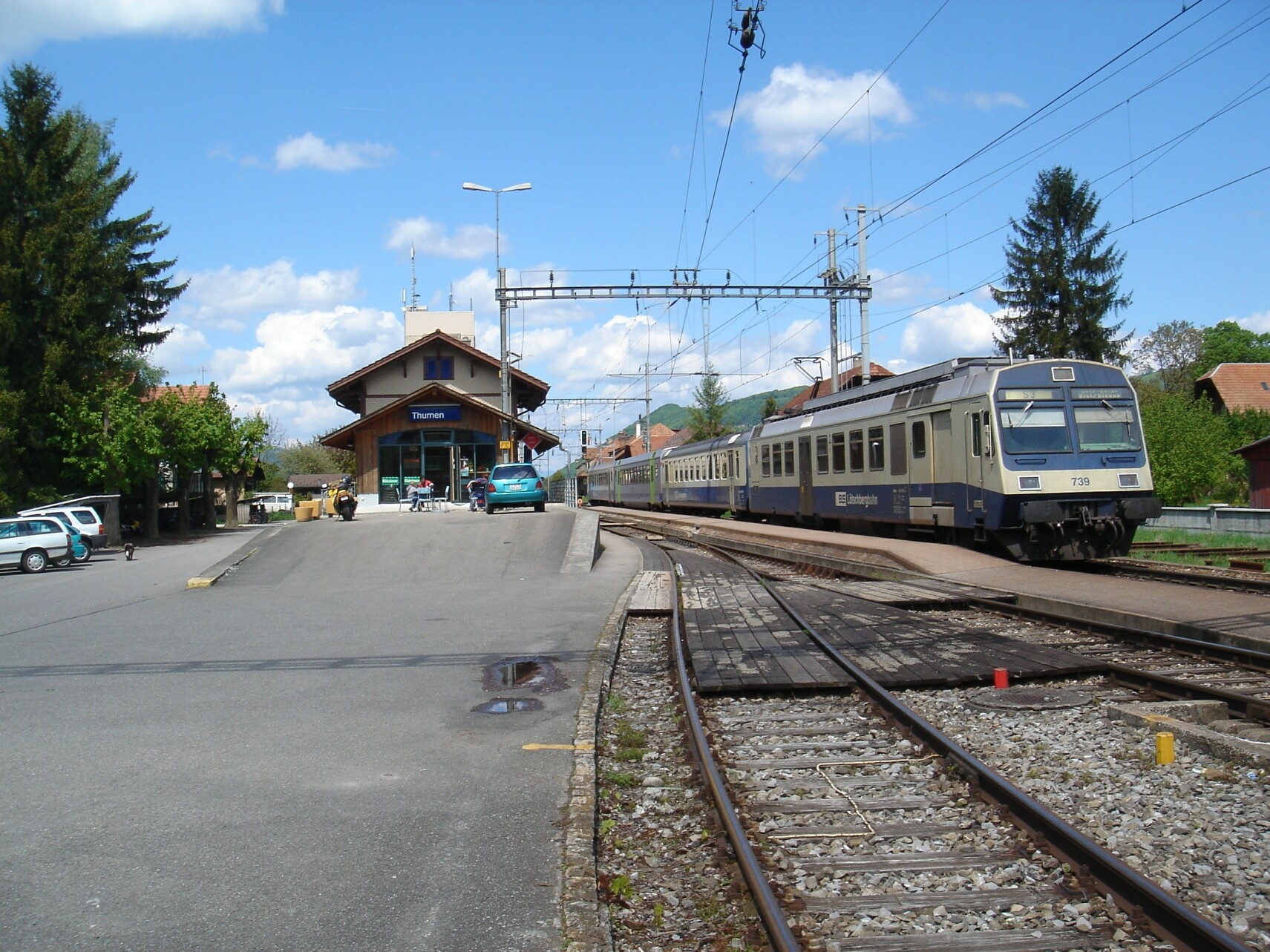
Thurnen railroad station

As of 2011, Mühlethurnen had an unemployment rate of 1.63%. As of 2011, there were a total of 253 people employed in the municipality. Of these, there were 28 people employed in the primary economic sector and about 11 businesses involved in this sector. 62 people were employed in the secondary sector and there were 16 businesses in this sector. 163 people were employed in the tertiary sector, with 43 businesses in this sector. There were 682 residents of the municipality who were employed in some capacity, of which females made up 44.4% of the workforce.

In 2008 there were a total of 174 full-time equivalent jobs. The number of jobs in the primary sector was 25, all of which were in agriculture. The number of jobs in the secondary sector was 69 of which 26 or (37.7%) were in manufacturing and 44 (63.8%) were in construction. The number of jobs in the tertiary sector was 80. In the tertiary sector; 26 or 32.5% were in wholesale or retail sales or the repair of motor vehicles, 6 or 7.5% were in the movement and storage of goods, 7 or 8.8% were in a hotel or restaurant, 1 was in the information industry, 14 or 17.5% were the insurance or financial industry, 3 or 3.8% were technical professionals or scientists, 12 or 15.0% were in education and 8 or 10.0% were in health care.

In 2000, there were 108 workers who commuted into the municipality and 529 workers who commuted away. The municipality is a net exporter of workers, with about 4.9 workers leaving the municipality for every one entering. A total of 152 workers (58.5% of the 260 total workers in the municipality) both lived and worked in Mühlethurnen. Of the working population, 33.4% used public transportation to get to work, and 44.6% used a private car.

In 2011 the average local and cantonal tax rate on a married resident, with two children, of Mühlethurnen making 150,000 CHF was 12.1%, while an unmarried resident's rate was 17.8%. For comparison, the average rate for the entire canton in the same year, was 14.2% and 22.0%, while the nationwide average was 12.3% and 21.1% respectively.

In 2009 there were a total of 606 tax payers in the municipality. Of that total, 218 made over 75,000 CHF per year. There were 3 people who made between 15,000 and 20,000 per year. The average income of the over 75,000 CHF group in Mühlethurnen was 115,013 CHF, while the average across all of Switzerland was 130,478 CHF.

In 2011 a total of 1.8% of the population received direct financial assistance from the government.

== Religion ==
From the 2000 census, 965 or 74.8% belonged to the Swiss Reformed Church, while 99 or 7.7% were Roman Catholic. Of the rest of the population, there were 5 members of an Orthodox church (or about 0.39% of the population), there were 3 individuals (or about 0.23% of the population) who belonged to the Christian Catholic Church, and there were 43 individuals (or about 3.33% of the population) who belonged to another Christian church. There were 6 (or about 0.47% of the population) who were Muslim. There was 1 person who was Buddhist and 16 individuals who were Hindu. 104 (or about 8.06% of the population) belonged to no church, are agnostic or atheist, and 48 individuals (or about 3.72% of the population) did not answer the question.

== Education ==
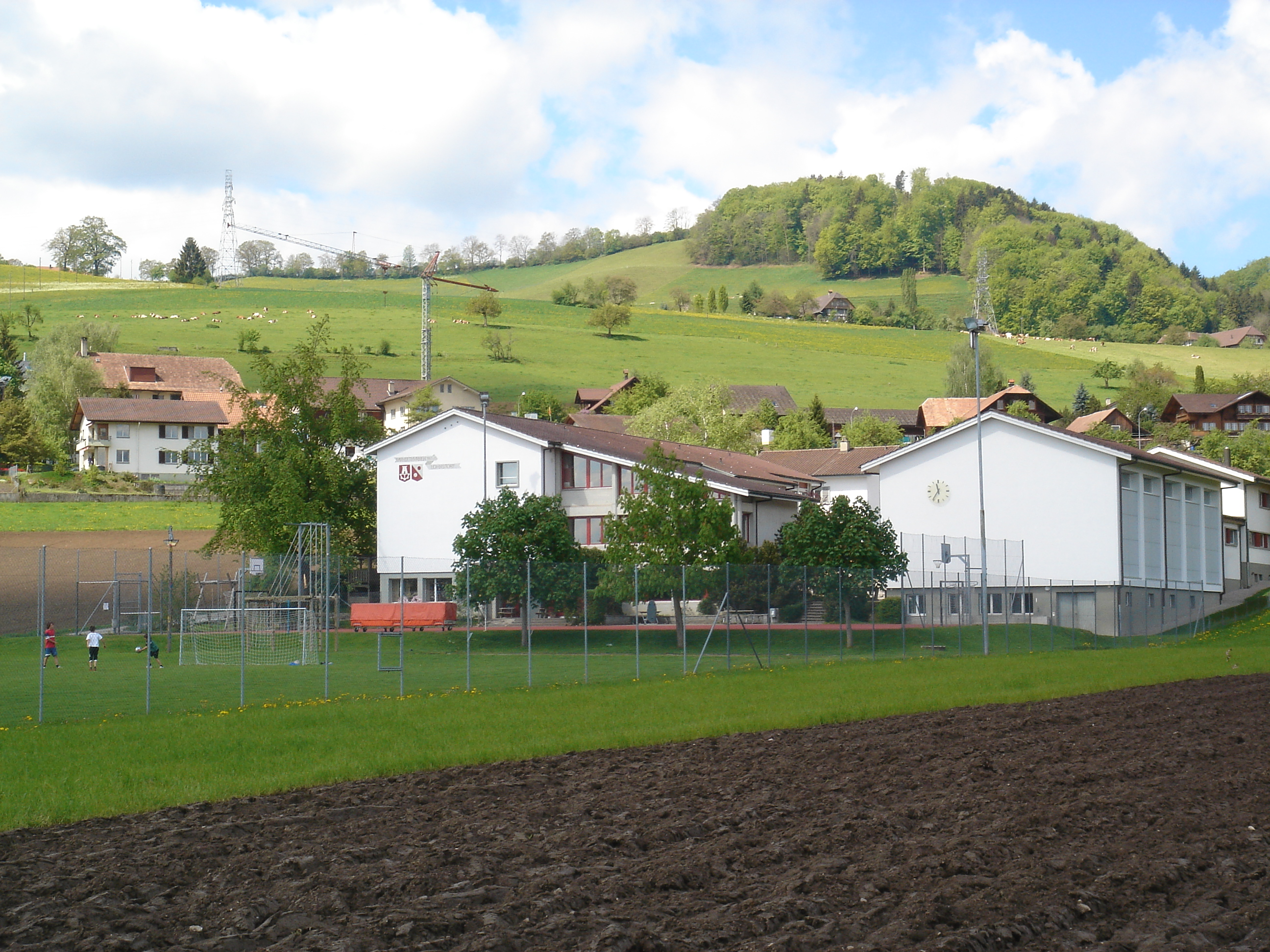
Mühlethurnen school house

In Mühlethurnen about 60.9% of the population have completed non-mandatory upper secondary education, and 21.3% have completed additional higher education (either university or a Fachhochschule). Of the 166 who had completed some form of tertiary schooling listed in the census, 73.5% were Swiss men, 19.9% were Swiss women, 3.0% were non-Swiss men and 3.6% were non-Swiss women.

The Canton of Bern school system provides one year of non-obligatory Kindergarten, followed by six years of Primary school. This is followed by three years of obligatory lower Secondary school where the students are separated according to ability and aptitude. Following the lower Secondary students may attend additional schooling or they may enter an apprenticeship.

During the 2011-12 school year, there were a total of 157 students attending classes in Mühlethurnen. There was one kindergarten class with a total of 23 students in the municipality. Of the kindergarten students, 4.3% were permanent or temporary residents of Switzerland (not citizens) and 4.3% have a different mother language than the classroom language. The municipality had 7 primary classes and 113 students. Of the primary students, 1.8% were permanent or temporary residents of Switzerland (not citizens) and 7.1% have a different mother language than the classroom language. During the same year, there were 2 lower secondary classes with a total of 21 students. There were 4.8% who were permanent or temporary residents of Switzerland (not citizens) and 4.8% have a different mother language than the classroom language.

As of 2000, there were a total of 170 students attending any school in the municipality. Of those, 141 both lived and attended school in the municipality, while 29 students came from another municipality. During the same year, 81 residents attended schools outside the municipality.
