= Lohnstorf =

- Former municipality
- Flag Coat of arms
- Location of Lohnstorf
- Location within Switzerland Location within Canton of Bern
- Coordinates: 46°48′N 7°31′E
- Country: Switzerland
- Canton: Bern
- District: Bern-Mittelland

Government
  - Mayor: Fritz Harri

Area
  - Total: 1.8 km^{2} (0.69 sq mi)
- Elevation: 570 m (1,870 ft)

Population (Dec 2012)
  - Total: 218
  - Density: 120/km^{2} (310/sq mi)
- Time zone: UTC+01:00 (CET)
  - Summer (DST): UTC+02:00 (CEST)
- Postal code: 3127
- SFOS number: 874
- ISO 3166 code: CH-BE
- Surrounded by: Burgistein, Kirchdorf, Mühlethurnen, Riggisberg
- Website: www.lohnstorf.ch

Lohnstorf is a former municipality in the Bern-Mittelland administrative district in the canton of Bern in Switzerland. On 1 January 2020 the former municipalities of Kirchenthurnen, Lohnstorf and Mühlethurnen merged to form the municipality of Thurnen.

== History ==
Lohnstorf is first mentioned in 1148 as Lonestrof. In 1279 it was mentioned as Lonstorf.

The oldest trace of a settlement is in Brühl, where the ruins of a Roman era settlement were found. By the 13th-14th century a number of Bernese patrician families owned land and rights in the village and surrounding farms. One of the landowners was Anna Seiler, who established a hospital in Bern and in 1354 willed her landholdings to support the hospital. Today she is remembered with the Anna Seiler Fountain in Bern. In 1343, the von Blankenburg family donated Kirchenthurnen and the surrounding land, which probably included Lohnstorf, to Interlaken Monastery. In 1528 Bern accepted the new faith of the Protestant Reformation and forcibly secularized the monastery and its lands, including Lohnstorf.

Throughout its history, Lohnstorf has been part of the large parish of Thurnen which is centered in Kirchenthurnen.

The Gürbe river correction projects of 1855-1911 helped drain the marshy valley floor and opened up farmland. Today, agriculture is the major industry in the municipality, though about two-thirds of the work force commute to jobs in surrounding towns and cities. Students from Lohnstorf travel to the school in Mühlethurnen.

== Geography ==
Lohnstorf has an area of 1.79 km^{2} (0.69 sq mi). As of 2012, a total of 1.66 km^{2} (0.64 mi^{2}) or 92.2% is used for agricultural purposes, while 0.03 km^{2} (0.012 mi^{2}) or 1.7% is forested. The rest of the municipality is 0.12 km^{2} (30 acres) or 6.7% is settled (buildings or roads), 0.02 km^{2} (4.9 acres) or 1.1% is either rivers or lakes.

During the same year, housing and buildings made up 3.3% and transportation infrastructure made up 3.3%. All of the forested land area is covered with heavy forests. Of the agricultural land, 57.8% is used for growing crops and 29.4% is pasturage, while 2.8% is used for orchards or vine crops and 2.2% is used for alpine pastures. All the water in the municipality is flowing water.

The municipality and village or Lohnstorf are located in the Gürbetal (Gürbe valley) near Längenberg mountain.

On 31 December 2009 Amtsbezirk Seftigen, the municipality's former district, was dissolved. On the following day, 1 January 2010, it joined the newly created Verwaltungskreis Bern-Mittelland.

== Coat of arms ==
The blazon of the municipal coat of arms is Per bend Argent and Gules two Roundels in bend sinister counterchanged.

== Demographics ==
Lohnstorf has a population (as of December 2020) of 242. As of 2012, 2.8% of the population are resident foreign nationals. Over the last 2 years (2010-2012) the population has changed at a rate of -4.4%. Migration accounted for -4.8%, while births and deaths accounted for 0.4%.

Most of the population (as of 2000) speaks German (197 or 99.0%) as their first language with the rest speaking French.

As of 2008, the population was 48.2% male and 51.8% female. The population was made up of 105 Swiss men (46.1% of the population) and 5 (2.2%) non-Swiss men. There were 116 Swiss women (50.9%) and 2 (0.9%) non-Swiss women. Of the population in the municipality, 77 or about 38.7% were born in Lohnstorf and lived there in 2000. There were 87 or 43.7% who were born in the same canton, while 24 or 12.1% were born somewhere else in Switzerland, and 6 or 3.0% were born outside of Switzerland.

As of 2012, children and teenagers (0–19 years old) make up 24.8% of the population, while adults (20–64 years old) make up 59.2% and seniors (over 64 years old) make up 16.1%.

As of 2000, there were 82 people who were single and never married in the municipality. There were 104 married individuals, 10 widows or widowers and 3 individuals who are divorced.

As of 2010, there were 23 households that consist of only one person and 7 households with five or more people. In 2000, a total of 69 apartments (88.5% of the total) were permanently occupied, while 5 apartments (6.4%) were seasonally occupied and 4 apartments (5.1%) were empty. In 2011, single family homes made up 36.9% of the total housing in the municipality.

The historical population is given in the following chart:

== Politics ==
In the 2011 federal election the most popular party was the Swiss People's Party (SVP) which received 44.4% of the vote. The next three most popular parties were the Social Democratic Party (SP) (20.2%), the Conservative Democratic Party (BDP) (16%) and the Green Liberal Party (GLP) (4.6%). In the federal election, a total of 102 votes were cast, and the voter turnout was 61.8%.

== Economy ==
As of 2011, Lohnstorf had an unemployment rate of 0.09%. As of 2011, there were a total of 82 people employed in the municipality. Of these, there were 35 people employed in the primary economic sector and about 11 businesses involved in this sector. 14 people were employed in the secondary sector and there were 2 businesses in this sector. 33 people were employed in the tertiary sector, with 6 businesses in this sector. There were 94 residents of the municipality who were employed in some capacity, of which females made up 42.6% of the workforce.

In 2008 there were a total of 64 full-time equivalent jobs. The number of jobs in the primary sector was 28, all of which were in agriculture. The number of jobs in the secondary sector was 26 of which 3 or (11.5%) were in manufacturing and 23 (88.5%) were in construction. The number of jobs in the tertiary sector was 10. In the tertiary sector; 2 or 20.0% were in a hotel or restaurant, 3 or 30.0% were technical professionals or scientists, 1 was in education.

In 2000, there were 19 workers who commuted into the municipality and 55 workers who commuted away. The municipality is a net exporter of workers, with about 2.9 workers leaving the municipality for every one entering. A total of 39 workers (67.2% of the 58 total workers in the municipality) both lived and worked in Lohnstorf. Of the working population, 20.2% used public transportation to get to work, and 38.3% used a private car.

In 2011 the average local and cantonal tax rate on a married resident, with two children, of Lohnstorf making 150,000 CHF was 12.4%, while an unmarried resident's rate was 18.2%. For comparison, the average rate for the entire canton in the same year, was 14.2% and 22.0%, while the nationwide average was 12.3% and 21.1% respectively.

In 2009 there were a total of 87 tax payers in the municipality. Of that total, 34 made over 75,000 CHF per year. There was one person who made between 15,000 and 20,000 per year. The average income of the over 75,000 CHF group in Lohnstorf was 124,588 CHF, while the average across all of Switzerland was 130,478 CHF.

In 2011 a total of 0.4% of the population received direct financial assistance from the government.

== Religion ==
From the 2000 census, 162 or 81.4% belonged to the Swiss Reformed Church, while 7 or 3.5% were Roman Catholic. Of the rest of the population, there were 3 individuals (or about 1.51% of the population) who belonged to another Christian church. There was 1 individual who was Muslim. 23 (or about 11.56% of the population) belonged to no church, are agnostic or atheist, and 3 individuals (or about 1.51% of the population) did not answer the question.

== Education ==
In Lohnstorf about 49.5% of the population have completed non-mandatory upper secondary education, and 28.6% have completed additional higher education (either university or a Fachhochschule). Of the 34 who had completed some form of tertiary schooling listed in the census, 58.8% were Swiss men, 38.2% were Swiss women.

As of 2000, there was one student living in the municipality and attending some type of school, while 30 students from Lohnstorf attended schools outside the municipality.
