= Riggisberg Castle =

Castle in Bern, Switzerland

- Schloss Riggisberg
- Riggisberg
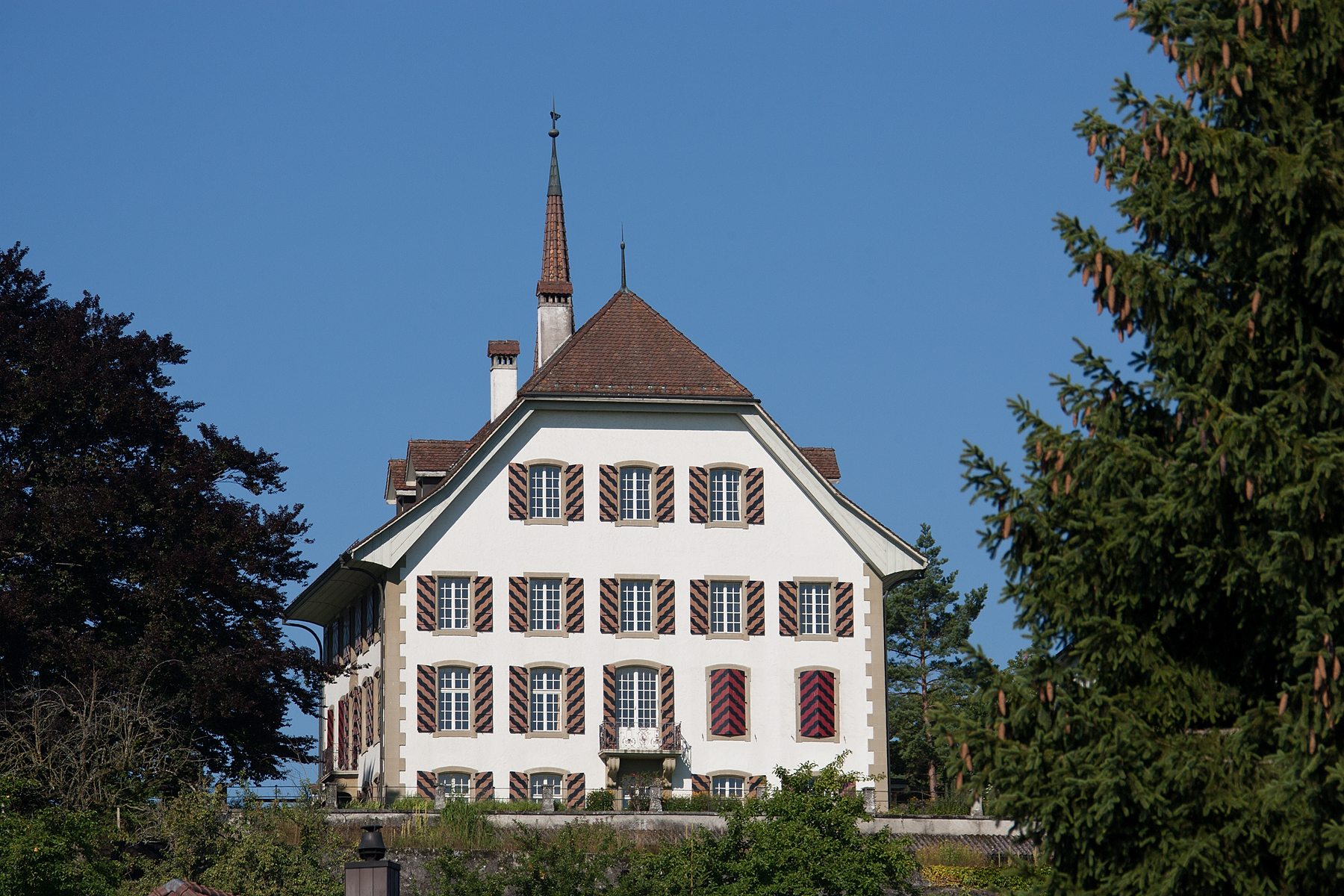
- Riggisberg Castle

Site information
- Owner: Canton of Bern

Location
- Coordinates: 46.5717°N 7.3820°E

Site history
- Built: 1st Castle: before 13th century 2nd Castle: 1700

Riggisberg Castle (German: Schloss Riggisberg) is a castle in the municipality of Riggisberg of the canton of Bern in Switzerland.

== History ==
=== First castle ===
During the Middle Ages the Fribourg noble family of Riggisberg was established with a seat in Riggisberg. The first one that appears in a historical record is Constantin de Rucasperc in 1140. His grandson Jacob Riggisberg established the Franciscan monastery in Fribourg on 15 May 1256 and was probably living in the city by that time. The family soon lost or sold all their rights and land in the village and by the 13th century other nobles and monasteries owned parts of the village. In 1337 the Riggisberg line died out and their remaining estates passed on to other owners.

The castle was acquired by Rudolf and Hans von Diesbach who then sold it to Jonatha von Billingen and her husband Jordan von Burgistein. The estate was then divided between his descendants and in 1345-46 was divided between Petermann von Burgistein and his sister Agnes. When Agnes married Peterman von Wichtrach in 1354, he acquired her half of the castle and estates. In 1362-63 he bought the other half of the estate from Petermann von Burgistein's sons, Konrad and Petermann von Burgistein. By 1358 Rudolph of Neuchâtel-Nidau owned the high court rights over the Herrschaft that included the castle, the village of Riggisberg, scattered farms and the courts of Riggisberg and Ruti. He granted Petermann von Wichtrach the full Zwing und Bann rights over the village on 28 September 1358. Peter's daughter and heiress Elizabeth von Wichtrach married Walther von Erlach in 1387, bringing the castle and lands to the powerful Bernese Erlach family for over 400 years.

The castle remained with the Erlach family, but was inherited by various cousins and relatives over the following centuries. In 1686, Hans Rudolf von Erlach lost the rights to the castle due to a judgement of the court. The castle was sold to Gabriel von Wattenwyl and on 17 November 1686 he became the Schultheiss and owner of Riggisberg. Four months later he sold the estate and title to Albrecht von Erlach and the estate came back under the Erlach name. Around 1700 Albrecht decided to build a new, more comfortable castle near the First or Long Castle.

The Long Castle remained in use for centuries afterward, but its importance waned. In 1938 it was demolished to make way for a new outbuilding that attaches to the Second Castle.

=== Second castle ===
In 1700 Albrecht von Erlach's new and more comfortable castle was finished. Because his only child, a daughter, was handicapped, in 1723 he willed the castle to Albert and Abraham von Erlach from another line. In 1735 Abraham von Erlach retired as a mercenary lieutenant-general in French service and returned to Riggisberg. He brought with him his noble wife, the Marquise Masson de Bessé and a black servant in livery, which excited the villagers. His son Abraham Friedrich von Erlach quickly spend his father's and his wife's fortunes and 1793 he was forced to sell the castle to his brother Karl Albrecht Ferdinand von Erlach. Karl Albrecht Ferdinand was a member of the Swiss Guard in the French court and was the last owner to hold the Zwing und Bann right over the villagers. Despite buying the castle and estates from his brother, his finances were also pretty shaky. In 1795 he sold a tract of 33 Juchart to pay off a 9000 Bernese Pound debt. In 1798 he sold another tract of land to pay off an additional 8000 Pound debt. In the same year, following the 1798 French invasion, the old landowners lost their right to personally own villages and lost the Zwing und Bann right. Riggisberg village became part of the Helvetic Republic district of Seftigen under Bern. The Erlachs only retained ownership to the castle and its associated lands. In 1800 he sold the castle and lands to Karl Friedrich Steiger. The following year, Karl Albrecht Ferdinand von Erlach died after falling off a ladder at the family castle in Spiez.

The Steiger family opposed the new Helvetic Republic and Karl Friedrich stayed in Prussian controlled Neuchâtel while plotting the overthrow of the new Republic. The weak Republic government was unable to enforce its will and finally collapsed in 1802. Karl Friedrich joined the Committee that managed the country until the Act of Mediation in 1803. Switzerland remained a vassal state of the French Republic until Napoleon's defeat and the Congress of Vienna in 1815. Karl Friedrich Steiger became a Bernese Senator, an office that he held until his retirement in 1826. After retiring he spent his summers at Riggisberg Castle until he sold it to his youngest son Franz Georg von Steiger in 1830.

On 31 August 1832, weapons and ammunition were discovered at the Erlacherhof, which had been stockpiled by the "Council of the Sevens" who planned to overthrow the reform-minded government. Franz Georg von Steiger was wrongly suspected as a co-conspirator, arrested and then set free after he paid a fine of fifty francs.

In 1869, his cousin, Robert Pigott from Ireland, inherited the estate. About a decade later, in 1880, he sold the castles to the Canton of Bern, who converted it into a poorhouse. In 1965-70 the new castle was renovated and converted into a district administration building.

== See also ==
- List of castles in Switzerland
