= Kirchenthurnen =

- Former municipality
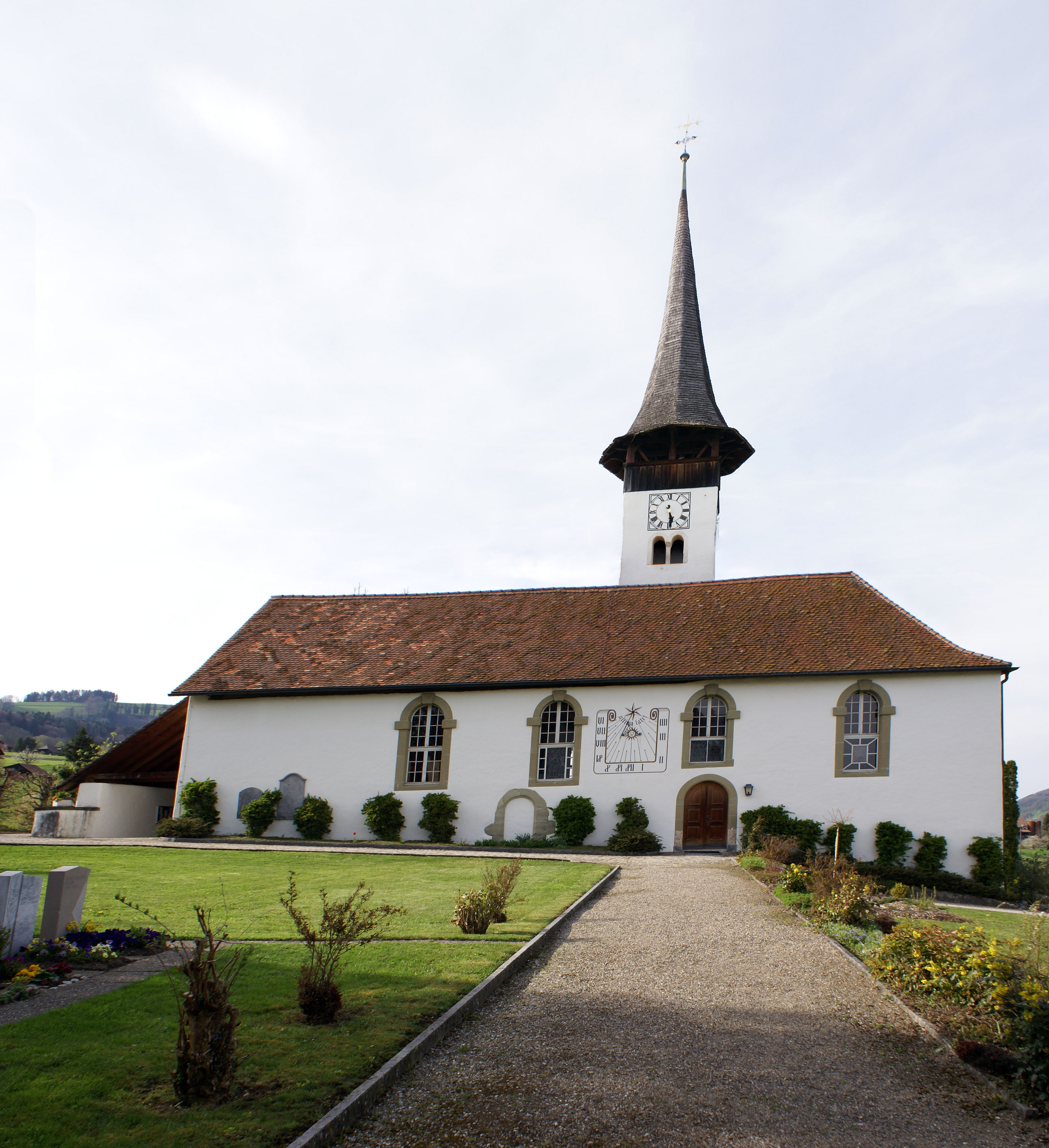

- Flag Coat of arms
- Location of Kirchenthurnen
- Location within Switzerland Location within Canton of Bern
- Coordinates: 46°49′N 7°30′E
- Country: Switzerland
- Canton: Bern
- District: Bern-Mittelland

Government
  - Mayor: Walter Wiedmer

Area
  - Total: 1.3 km^{2} (0.50 sq mi)
- Elevation: 612 m (2,008 ft)

Population (Dec 2012)
  - Total: 272
  - Density: 210/km^{2} (540/sq mi)
- Time zone: UTC+01:00 (CET)
  - Summer (DST): UTC+02:00 (CEST)
- Postal code: 3128
- SFOS number: 873
- ISO 3166 code: CH-BE
- Surrounded by: Gelterfingen, Mühledorf, Mühlethurnen, Riggisberg, Rümligen
- Website: www.kirchenthurnen.ch

Kirchenthurnen is a former municipality in the Bern-Mittelland administrative district in the canton of Bern in Switzerland. On 1 January 2020 the former municipalities of Kirchenthurnen, Lohnstorf and Mühlethurnen merged to form the municipality of Thurnen.

== History ==
Kirchenthurnen is first mentioned in 1228 as Tornes. Until 1860 it was known as Thurnen. The name was changed to prevent confusion with the municipality of Mühlethurnen.

The oldest trace of a settlement in the area are several Hallstatt era graves discovered at the Ried gravel pit. By the 14th century the village was owned by the von Blankenburg family from Bern The village church was first mentioned in 1228. In 1343 the village, church and surrounding lands were donated by the Blankenburgs to Interlaken Monastery. In 1528 Bern adopted the new faith of the Protestant Reformation and forcefully secularized Interlaken Monastery. This brought Kirchenthurnen under Bernese rule and it became the center of the bailiwick of Thurnen, though in the 18th century it moved to Mühlethurnen.

In the 19th century the population began to grow for a while, though it dropped after 1880. In the 1960s it grew again as Bern expanded and commuters moved into more distant communities. By 2000, about two-thirds of the working population commute to jobs outside the municipality.

== Geography ==
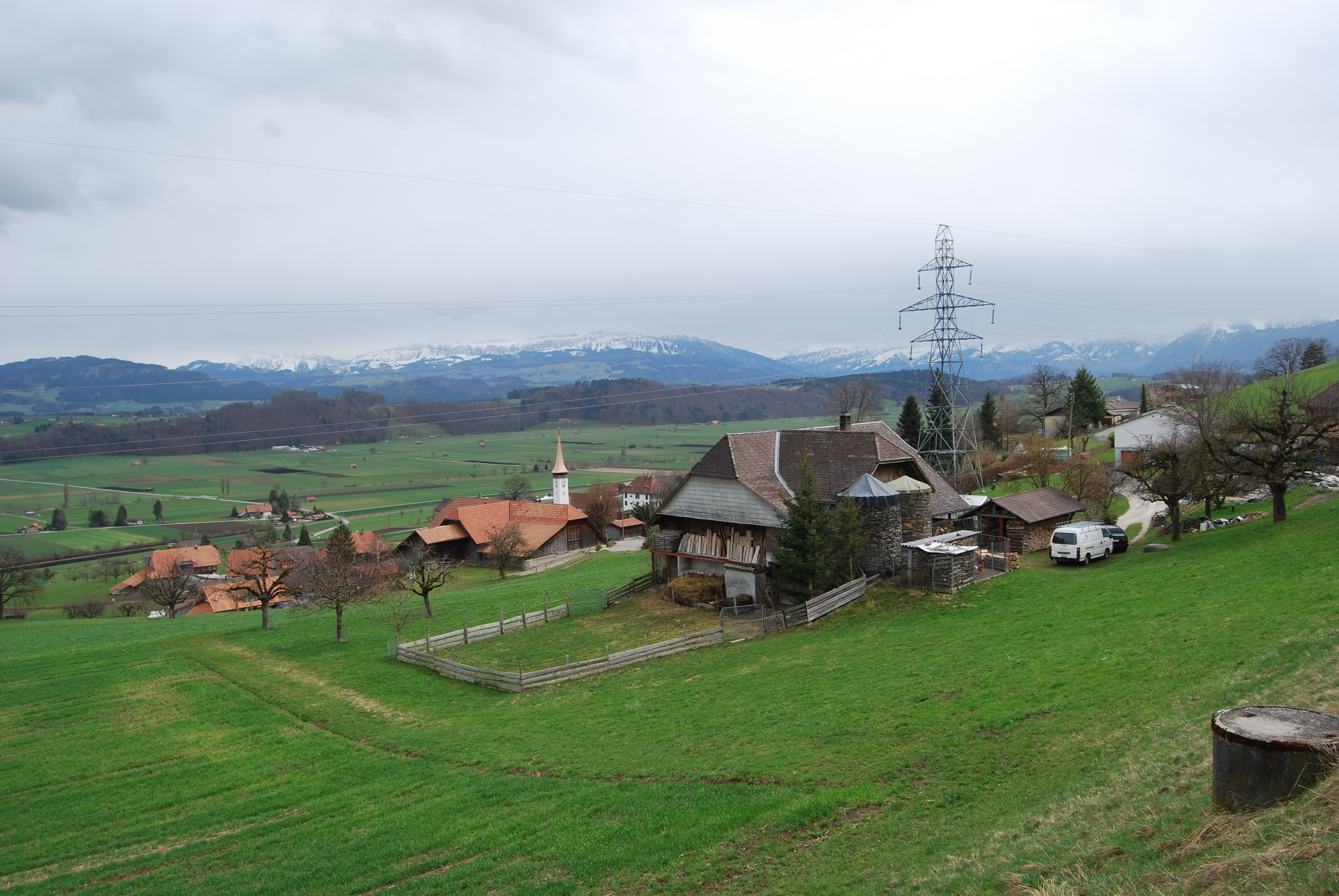
Kirchenthurnen

Kirchenthurnen has an area of 1.23 km^{2} (0.47 sq mi). As of 2012, a total of 0.97 km^{2} (0.37 mi^{2}) or 77.6% is used for agricultural purposes, while 0.13 km^{2} (0.050 mi^{2}) or 10.4% is forested. The rest of the municipality is 0.15 km^{2} (37 acres) or 12.0% is settled (buildings or roads), 0.01 km^{2} (2.5 acres) or 0.8% is either rivers or lakes.

During the same year, housing and buildings made up 8.0% and transportation infrastructure made up 3.2%. All of the forested land area is covered with heavy forests. Of the agricultural land, 46.4% is used for growing crops and 30.4% is pasturage. All the water in the municipality is flowing water.

It is located in the Gürbetal (Gürbe valley) on the eastern slope of the Längenberg. The parish of Kirchenthurnen includes Burgistein, Kaufdorf, Lohnstorf, Mühlethurnen and Rümligen.

On 31 December 2009 Amtsbezirk Seftigen, the municipality's former district, was dissolved. On the following day, 1 January 2010, it joined the newly created Verwaltungskreis Bern-Mittelland.

== Coat of arms ==
The blazon of the municipal coat of arms is Gules a Tower embatteled Argent.

== Demographics ==
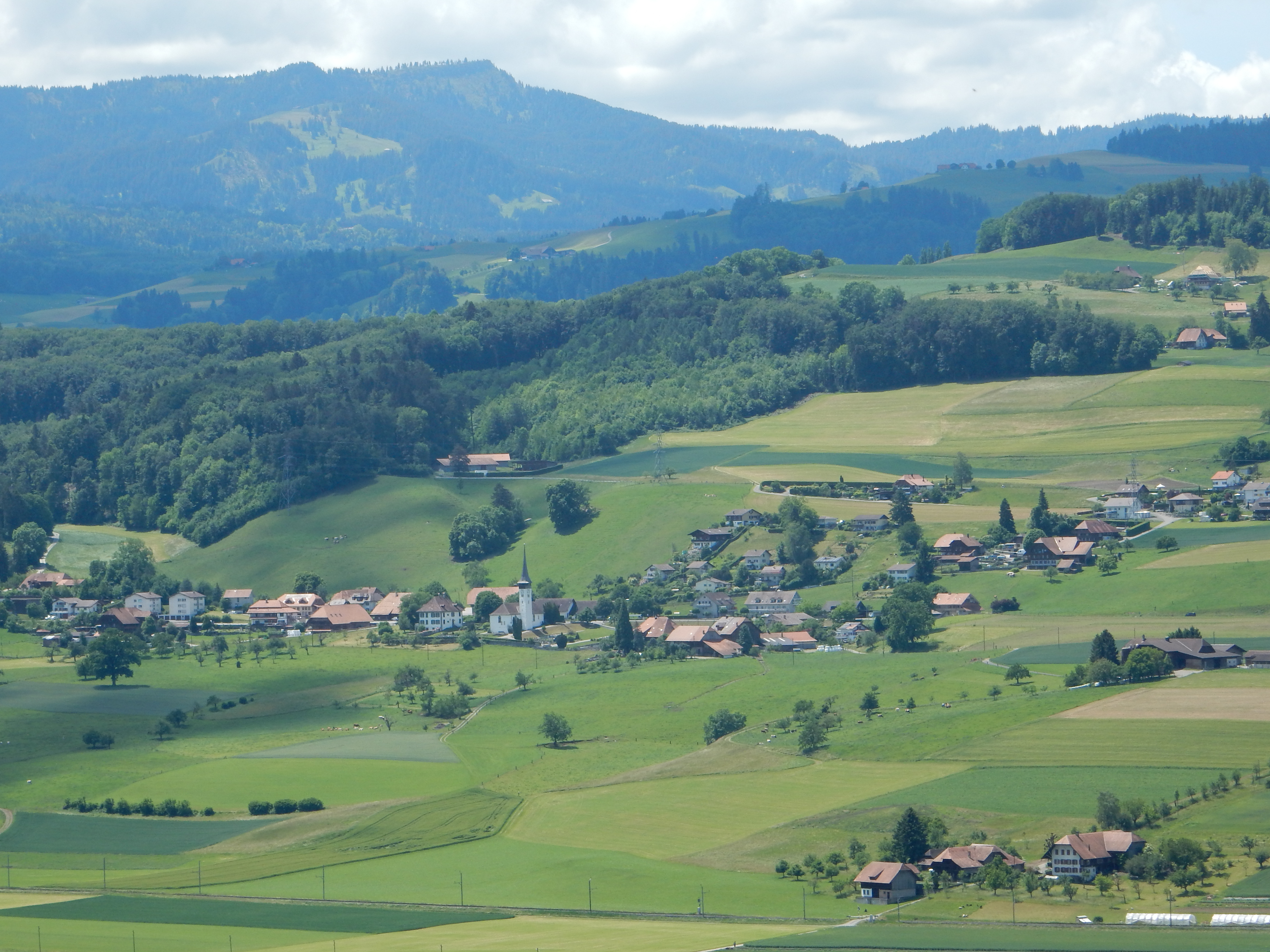
Kirchenthurnen

Kirchenthurnen has a population (as of December 2020) of 305. As of 2012, 2.9% of the population are resident foreign nationals. Over the last 2 years (2010-2012) the population has changed at a rate of -0.4%. Migration accounted for -0.7%, while births and deaths accounted for 1.1%.

Most of the population (as of 2000) speaks German (284 or 97.3%) as their first language, French is the second most common (3 or 1.0%).

As of 2008, the population was 45.1% male and 54.9% female. The population was made up of 118 Swiss men (43.2% of the population) and 5 (1.8%) non-Swiss men. There were 146 Swiss women (53.5%) and 4 (1.5%) non-Swiss women. Of the population in the municipality, 73 or about 25.0% were born in Kirchenthurnen and lived there in 2000. There were 164 or 56.2% who were born in the same canton, while 36 or 12.3% were born somewhere else in Switzerland, and 15 or 5.1% were born outside of Switzerland.

As of 2012, children and teenagers (0–19 years old) make up 16.9% of the population, while adults (20–64 years old) make up 59.9% and seniors (over 64 years old) make up 23.2%.

As of 2000, there were 110 people who were single and never married in the municipality. There were 142 married individuals, 22 widows or widowers and 18 individuals who are divorced.

As of 2010, there were 39 households that consist of only one person and 3 households with five or more people. In 2000, a total of 126 apartments (91.3% of the total) were permanently occupied, while 3 apartments (2.2%) were seasonally occupied and 9 apartments (6.5%) were empty. The vacancy rate for the municipality, in 2013, was 0.6896551724%. In 2011, single family homes made up 40.3% of the total housing in the municipality.

The historical population is given in the following chart:

== Politics ==
In the 2011 federal election the most popular party was the Swiss People's Party (SVP) which received 35.6% of the vote. The next three most popular parties were the Conservative Democratic Party (BDP) (20%), the Federal Democratic Union of Switzerland (EDU) (10.7%) and the Social Democratic Party (SP) (8.3%). In the federal election, a total of 111 votes were cast, and the voter turnout was 49.8%.

== Economy ==
As of 2011, Kirchenthurnen had an unemployment rate of 2.15%. As of 2011, there were a total of 56 people employed in the municipality. Of these, there were 23 people employed in the primary economic sector and about 8 businesses involved in this sector. 19 people were employed in the secondary sector and there was 1 business in this sector. 14 people were employed in the tertiary sector, with 7 businesses in this sector. There were 165 residents of the municipality who were employed in some capacity, of which females made up 43.6% of the workforce.

In 2008 there were a total of 43 full-time equivalent jobs. The number of jobs in the primary sector was 13, all of which were in agriculture. The number of jobs in the secondary sector was 23 of which 2 or (8.7%) were in manufacturing and 20 (87.0%) were in construction. The number of jobs in the tertiary sector was 7 of which 3 were in education.

In 2000, there were 29 workers who commuted into the municipality and 126 workers who commuted away. The municipality is a net exporter of workers, with about 4.3 workers leaving the municipality for every one entering. A total of 39 workers (57.4% of the 68 total workers in the municipality) both lived and worked in Kirchenthurnen. Of the working population, 15.8% used public transportation to get to work, and 55.2% used a private car.

In 2011 the average local and cantonal tax rate on a married resident, with two children, of Kirchenthurnen making 150,000 CHF was 12.5%, while an unmarried resident's rate was 18.3%. For comparison, the average rate for the entire canton in the same year, was 14.2% and 22.0%, while the nationwide average was 12.3% and 21.1% respectively.

In 2009 there were a total of 141 tax payers in the municipality. Of that total, 25 made over 75,000 CHF per year. There was one person who made between 15,000 and 20,000 per year. The greatest number of workers, 47, made between 50,000 and 75,000 CHF per year. The average income of the over 75,000 CHF group in Kirchenthurnen was 104,764 CHF, while the average across all of Switzerland was 130,478 CHF.

In 2011 a total of 2.9% of the population received direct financial assistance from the government.

== Religion ==
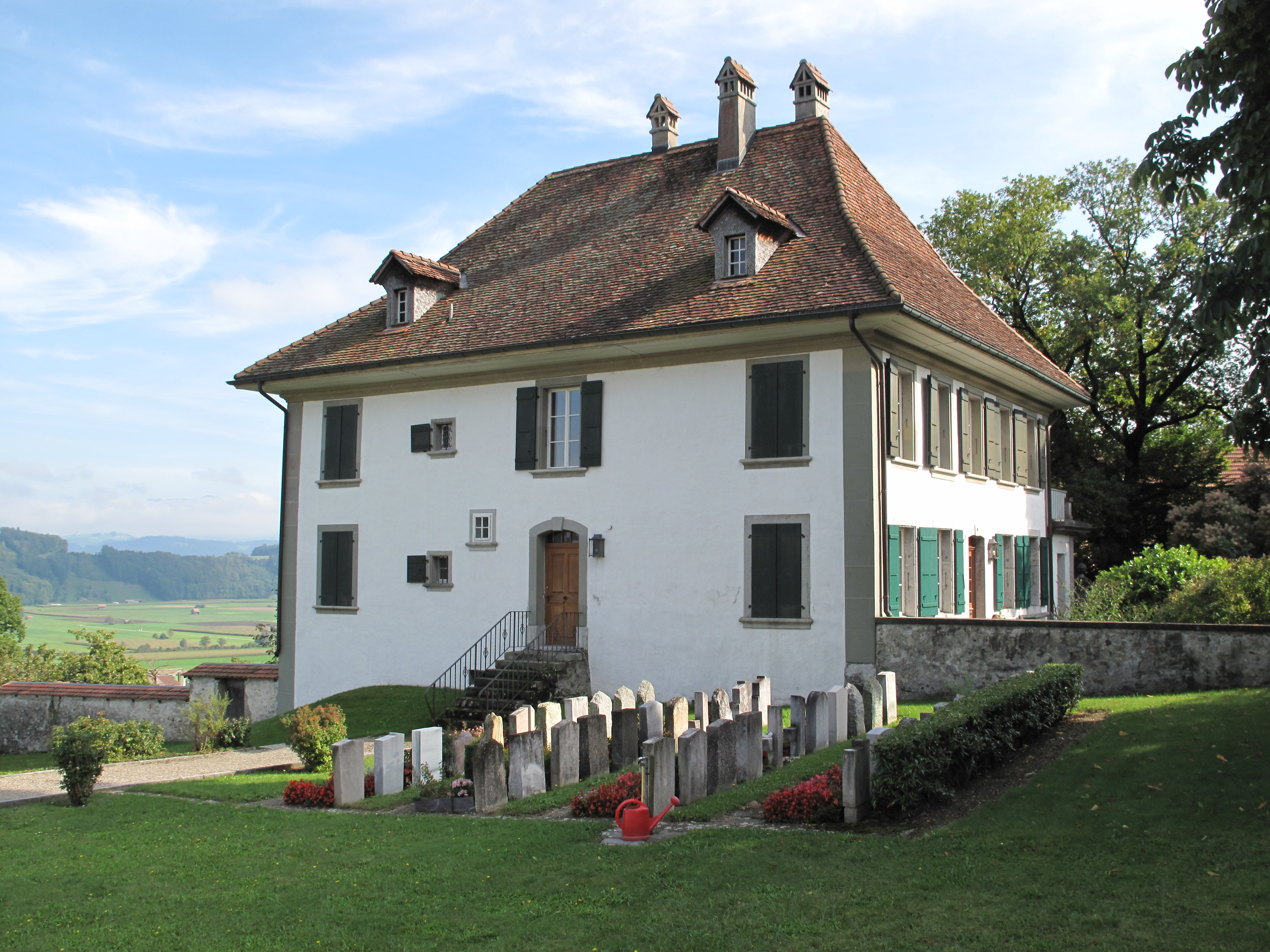
Thurnen parish rectory in Kirchenthurnen

From the 2000 census, 259 or 88.7% belonged to the Swiss Reformed Church, while 12 or 4.1% were Roman Catholic. Of the rest of the population, there were 4 members of an Orthodox church (or about 1.37% of the population), and there were 3 individuals (or about 1.03% of the population) who belonged to another Christian church. 11 (or about 3.77% of the population) belonged to no church, are agnostic or atheist, and 3 individuals (or about 1.03% of the population) did not answer the question.

== Education ==
In Kirchenthurnen about 63.1% of the population have completed non-mandatory upper secondary education, and 12.7% have completed additional higher education (either university or a Fachhochschule). Of the 23 who had completed some form of tertiary schooling listed in the census, 69.6% were Swiss men, 21.7% were Swiss women.

The Canton of Bern school system provides one year of non-obligatory Kindergarten, followed by six years of Primary school. This is followed by three years of obligatory lower Secondary school where the students are separated according to ability and aptitude. Following the lower Secondary students may attend additional schooling or they may enter an apprenticeship.

During the 2011-12 school year, there were a total of 39 students attending classes from Kirchenthurnen. There was one kindergarten class with a total of 15 students in the municipality. The municipality had no primary school classes, but 18 students attended school in a neighboring municipality. During the same year, there was one lower secondary class with a total of 6 students.

As of 2000, there were a total of 29 students attending any school in the municipality. Of those, 22 both lived and attended school in the municipality, while 7 students came from another municipality. During the same year, 10 residents attended schools outside the municipality.
