= Riggisberg =

- Municipality
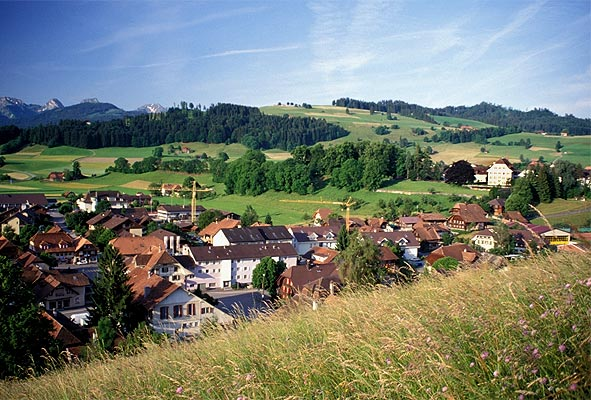
- Riggisberg village

- Flag Coat of arms
- Location of Riggisberg
- Location within Switzerland Location within Canton of Bern
- Coordinates: 46°49′N 7°29′E
- Country: Switzerland
- Canton: Bern
- District: Bern-Mittelland

Government
  - Executive: Gemeinderat with 7 members
  - Mayor: Gemeindepräsident(in); Michael Bürki (as of 2026)

Area
  - Total: 7.7 km^{2} (3.0 sq mi)
- Elevation: 762 m (2,500 ft)

Population (December 2020)
  - Total: 2,599
  - Density: 340/km^{2} (870/sq mi)
- Time zone: UTC+01:00 (CET)
  - Summer (DST): UTC+02:00 (CEST)
- Postal code: 3132
- SFOS number: 879
- ISO 3166 code: CH-BE
- Surrounded by: Burgistein, Kirchenthurnen, Lohnstorf, Mühlethurnen, Rüeggisberg, Rümligen
- Website: www.riggisberg.ch

Riggisberg is a municipality in the Bern-Mittelland administrative district in the canton of Bern in Switzerland.

On January 1, 2009, the municipality of Rüti bei Riggisberg became part of the municipality of Riggisberg. On 1 January 2021 the former municipality of Rümligen merged into Riggisberg.

== History ==
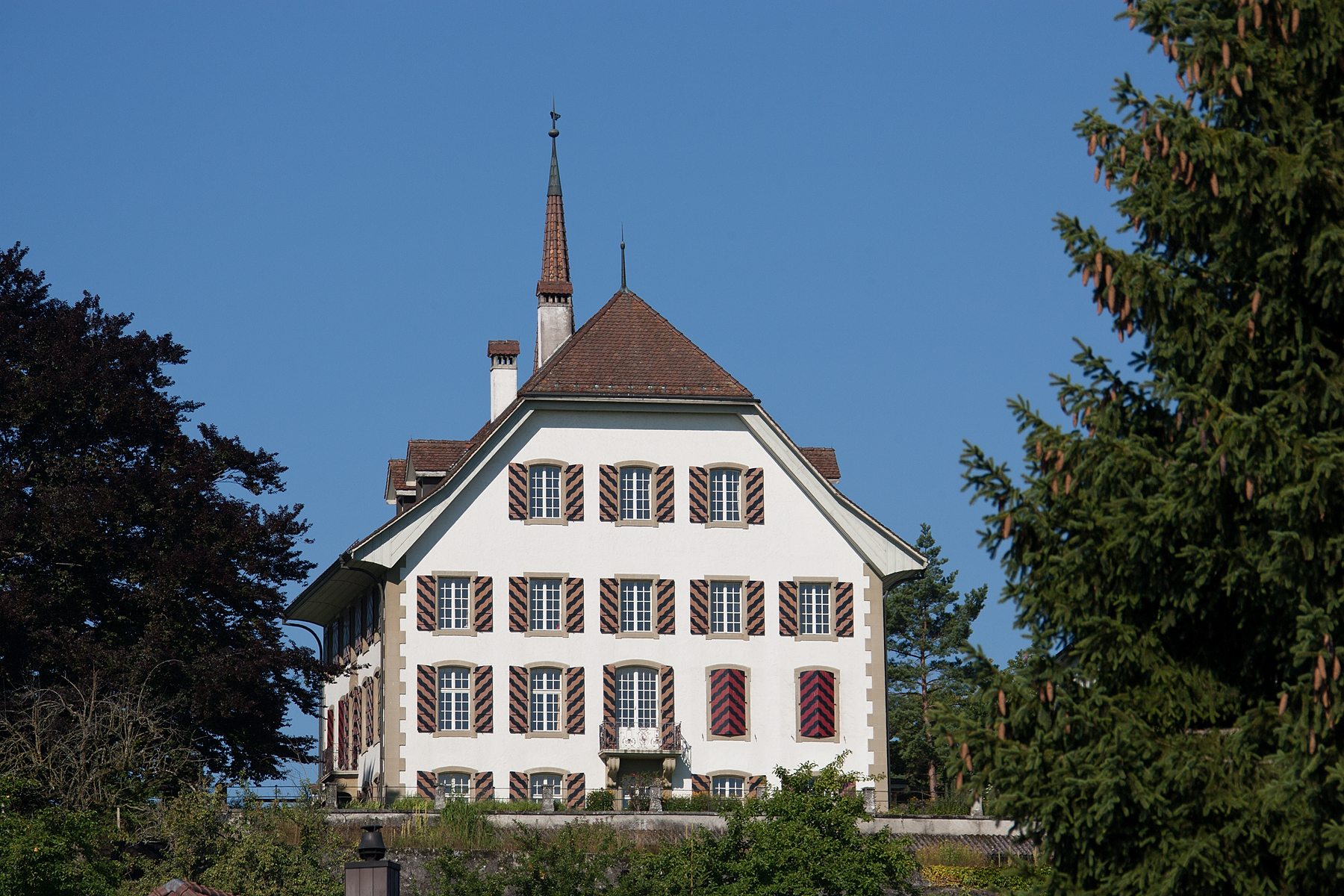
Riggisberg castle

Riggisberg is first mentioned in 1239 as Ricasperc. In 1270 it was mentioned as Riggesberg.

The oldest trace of a settlement in the area are several Iron Age graves at Kreuzbühlhölzli. During the Roman era there was a settlement at Muriboden. During the Middle Ages the Fribourg noble family of Riggisberg was established with a seat in Riggisberg. However, the family soon lost or sold all their rights and land in the village and by the 13th century other nobles and monasteries owned parts of the village. It passed through several noble landowners until it was acquired by Petermann von Wichtrach when he married Agnes von Burgistein in 1354. In 1358 Rudolph of Neuchâtel-Nidau acquired the high court and rulership over the Herrschaft of Riggisberg that included the castle of Uf Gsteig, the village of Riggisberg, scattered farms and the courts of Riggisberg and Ruti. In 1387 the powerful Erlach family of Bern acquired the village and Herrschaft. In 1700 the Erlachs built a new and more comfortable castle near the old castle.

Following the 1798 French invasion, the old landowners lost their right to personally own villages. Riggisberg became part of the Helvetic Republic district of Seftigen under Bern. In the following year the Erlachs sold the castles and surrounding lands to Karl Friedrich Steiger. In 1869, his cousin, Robert Pigott from Ireland, inherited the estate. About a decade later, in 1880, he sold the castles to the Canton of Bern, who converted it into a poorhouse. In 1939 the old castle was demolished. In 1965-70 the new castle was renovated and converted into a district administration building.

During World War II around midnight on 12–13 July 1943, the village was bombed by Allied bombers that were attempting to attack Italy. As many as 200 bombs were dropped and the village was severely damaged.

Historically, Riggisberg and Rüti both belonged to the large parish of Thurnen. They split off to form their own parish in 1874 and became fully independent in 1935. The local St. Sebastian Chapel was probably built in the 12th century, but was first mentioned in 1343. The late-Romanesque choir tower was probably built during the second half of the 12th century. The current nave was built in 1687 but expanded in 1939 and again in 1977-79.

The village has had a mixture of agriculture and small businesses throughout its history. Riggisberg gradually grew into a regional center for the surrounding small farming villages. In the 20th century, a district hospital and a district nursing home, as well as a secondary school for the surrounding six municipalities, opened in the village. In 1961 the Zürich textile industrialist Werner Abegg founded the Abegg-Stiftung (Abegg Foundation) and in 1967 the Foundation opened the Textile Museum in Riggisberg.

=== Rümligen ===
Rümligen is first mentioned in 1075 as Rumelingen.

The oldest trace of a settlement in the area is a cache of Early-Bronze Age axes. During the High Middle Ages the Freiherr von Rümligen owned a vast swathe of land between the Gürbe and Sense rivers. They donated some of their estates to found and support Rüeggisberg and Röthenbach Priories. In 1380 the Sommerau-Rümligen family inherited the land when Alisa von Rümligen married into the Sommerau family. In 1388 the Freiherren came under Bernese control, though they continued to own the estates for another century and a half. In 1515 the Sommerau-Rümligen lost the Herrschaft and by the 17th century a series of Bernese patrician families owned Rümligen. In 1709 Samuel Frisching, built the modern Rümligen Castle around the core of the medieval castle.

The village has always been part of the large parish of Thurnen.

The local farmers raised crops on the valley floor and pastured cattle in seasonal alpine camps. Today a large minority (43%) of the local jobs are still in agriculture. About two-thirds of the work force commutes to jobs in nearby cities. The municipal association runs a small school in the village.

== Geography ==
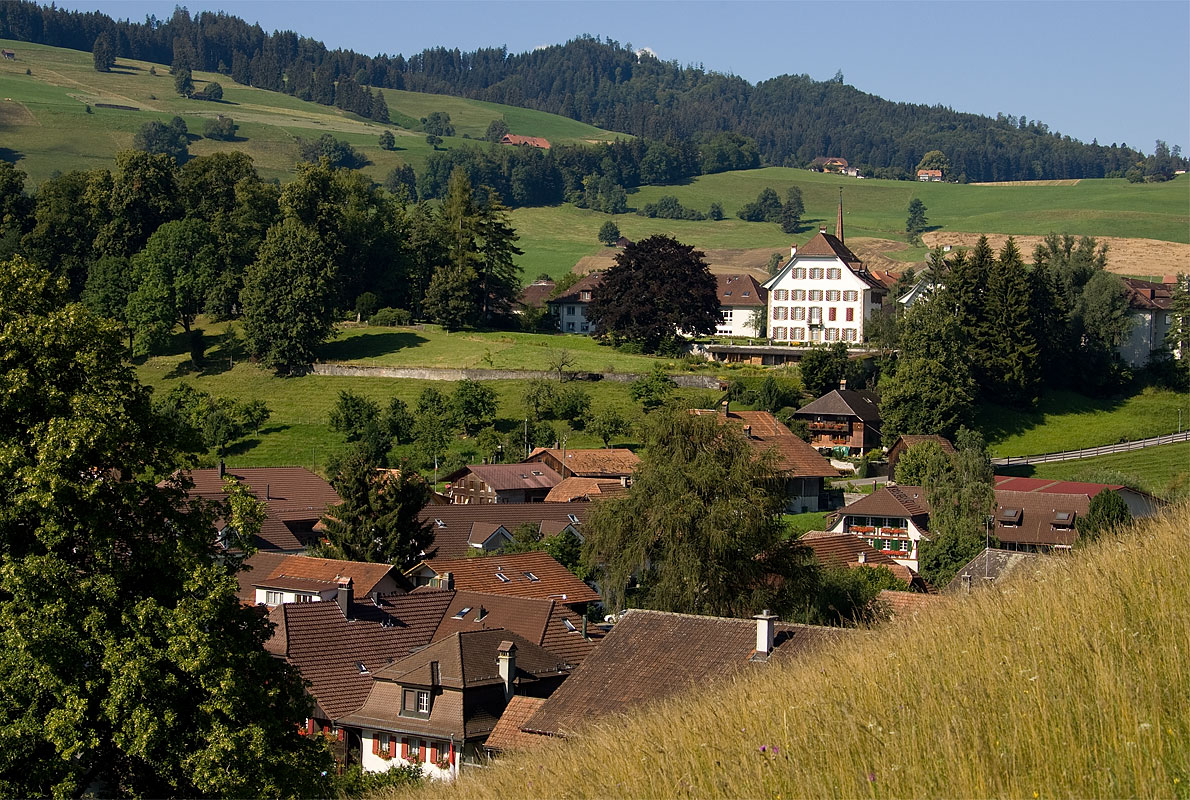
Riggisberg village and Castle

Riggisberg has an area of 34.5 km^{2} (13.32 sq mi). As of 2012, a total of 12.84 km^{2} (4.96 mi^{2}) or 43.0% is used for agricultural purposes, while 15.26 km^{2} (5.89 mi^{2}) or 51.1% is forested. The rest of the municipality is 1.62 km^{2} (0.63 mi^{2}) or 5.4% is settled (buildings or roads), 0.11 km^{2} (27 acres) or 0.4% is either rivers or lakes and 0.1 km^{2} (25 acres) or 0.3% is unproductive land.

During the same year, housing and buildings made up 3.0% and transportation infrastructure made up 1.8%. A total of 49.6% of the total land area is heavily forested and 1.3% is covered with orchards or small clusters of trees. Of the agricultural land, 11.9% is used for growing crops and 27.8% is pasturage and 2.6% is used for alpine pastures. All the water in the municipality is flowing water.

Before the merger Riggisberg had an area of 7.7 km^{2} (3.0 sq mi). Of this area, 76.9% was used for agricultural purposes, while 9.7% was forested. Of the rest of the land, 12.8% was settled (buildings or roads) and the remainder (0.5%) was non-productive (rivers, glaciers or mountains). Rüti bei Riggisberg had an area of 22.2 km^{2} (8.6 sq mi). Of this area, 32.1% was used for agricultural purposes, while 64.3% was forested. Of the rest of the land, 2.1% was settled (buildings or roads) and the remainder (1.5%) was non-productive (rivers, glaciers or mountains).

The elevation of Riggisberg is 763 m (2,503 ft), with the lowest point at 669 m (2,195 ft) and the highest point at 1,616 m (5,302 ft).

The municipality is located in the valley between the Längenberg and the Gibelegg. It consists of the villages of Riggisberg and Rüti bei Riggisberg as well as scattered hamlets and farm houses.

On 1 January 2009 the former municipality of Rüti bei Riggisberg merged into the municipality of Riggisberg.

On 31 December 2009 Amtsbezirk Seftigen, the municipality's former district, was dissolved. On the following day, 1 January 2010, it joined the newly created Verwaltungskreis Bern-Mittelland.

== Coat of arms ==
The blazon of the municipal coat of arms is Azure a Royal Crown Or on a Mount of 3 Coupeaux Vert.

== Demographics ==
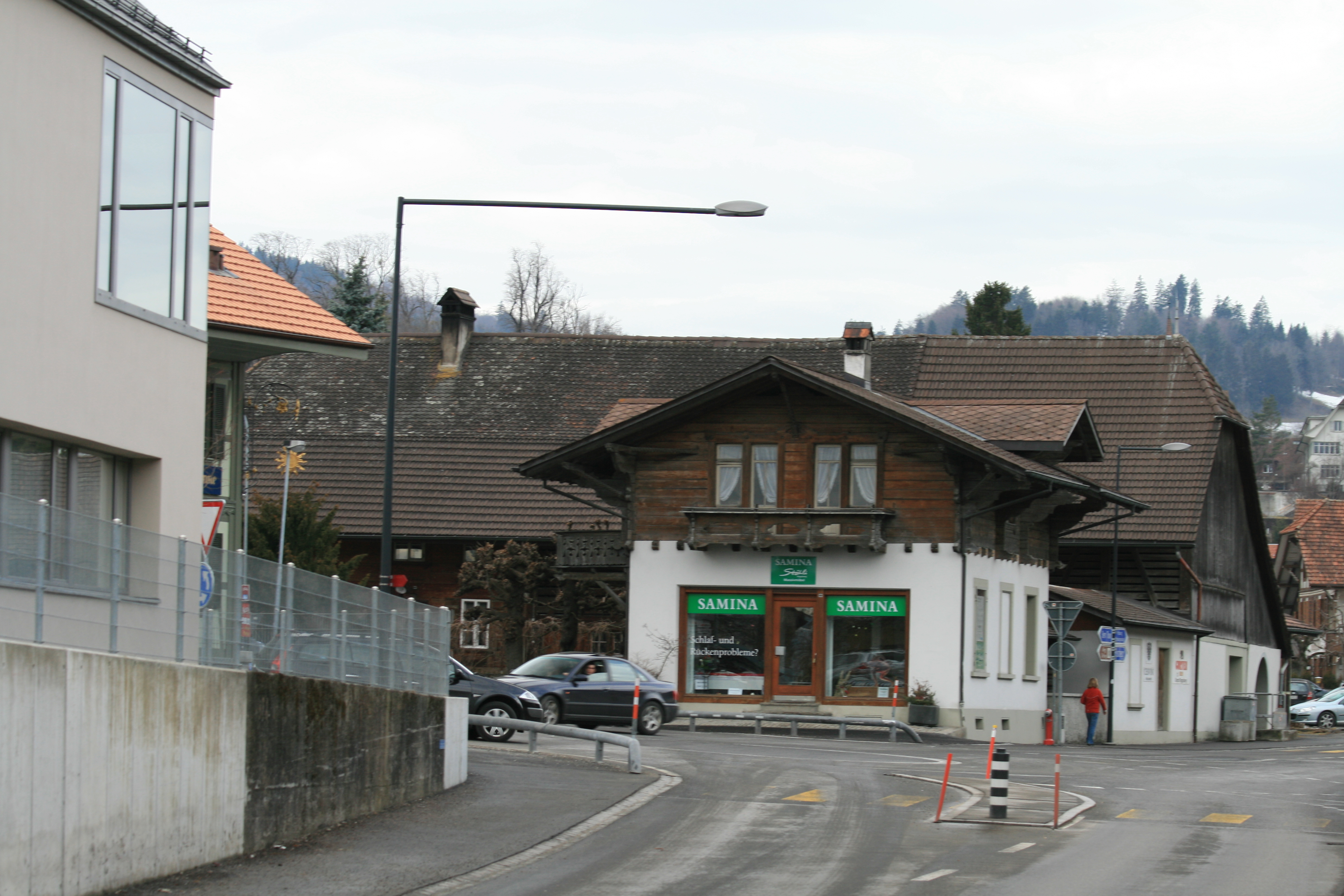
Riggisberg village

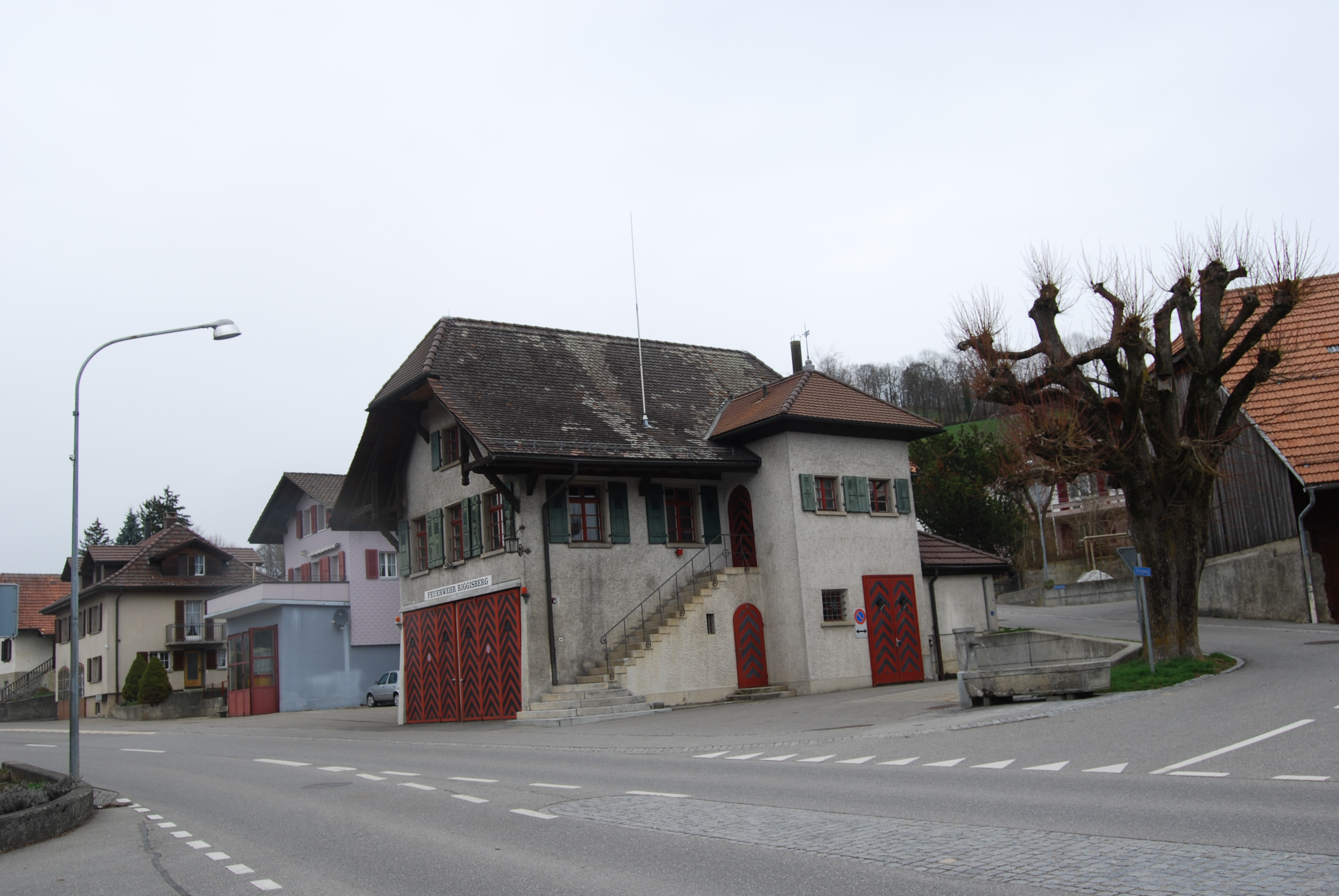
Houses in Riggisberg

Riggisberg has a population (as of December 2020) of 2,599. As of 2012, 3.9% of the population are resident foreign nationals. Over the last 2 years (2010-2012) the population has changed at a rate of 0.3%. Migration accounted for 0.3%, while births and deaths accounted for -0.3%.

Most of the population (as of 2000) speaks German (2,043 or 94.5%) as their first language, Albanian is the second most common (22 or 1.0%) and Turkish is the third (22 or 1.0%). There are 9 people who speak French, 7 people who speak Italian and 3 people who speak Romansh.

As of 2008, the population was 48.2% male and 51.8% female. The population was made up of 1,097 Swiss men (45.8% of the population) and 56 (2.3%) non-Swiss men. There were 1,190 Swiss women (49.7%) and 51 (2.1%) non-Swiss women. Of the population in the municipality, 686 or about 31.7% were born in Riggisberg and lived there in 2000. There were 1,004 or 46.4% who were born in the same canton, while 225 or 10.4% were born somewhere else in Switzerland, and 180 or 8.3% were born outside of Switzerland.

As of 2012, children and teenagers (0–19 years old) make up 21.8% of the population, while adults (20–64 years old) make up 57.4% and seniors (over 64 years old) make up 20.7%.

As of 2000, there were 985 people who were single and never married in the municipality. There were 915 married individuals, 168 widows or widowers and 94 individuals who are divorced.

As of 2010, there were 316 households that consist of only one person and 71 households with five or more people. In 2000, a total of 736 apartments (90.8% of the total) were permanently occupied, while 31 apartments (3.8%) were seasonally occupied and 44 apartments (5.4%) were empty. As of 2012, the construction rate of new housing units was 2.5 new units per 1000 residents. The vacancy rate for the municipality, in 2013, was 4.3%. In 2011, single family homes made up 43.0% of the total housing in the municipality.

=== Rüti bei Riggisberg ===
Rüti bei Riggisberg had a population (as of 2007) of 411, of which 1.9% were foreign nationals. Over the last 10 years before the merger, the population has decreased at a rate of 13.1%. Most of the population (as of 2000) speaks German (98.9%), with French being second most common (0.7%) and Portuguese being third (0.5%).

In the 2007 election the most popular party was the SVP which received 72.7% of the vote. The next two most popular parties were the FDP (8%) and the SPS (4.5%).

The age distribution of the population (as of 2000) is children and teenagers (0–19 years old) make up 31.8% of the population, while adults (20–64 years old) make up 51.6% and seniors (over 64 years old) make up 16.7%. In Rüti bei Riggisberg about 60% of the population (between age 25-64) have completed either non-mandatory upper secondary education or additional higher education (either university or a Fachhochschule).

Rüti bei Riggisberg had an unemployment rate of 1.24%. As of 2005, there were 99 people employed in the primary economic sector and about 34 businesses involved in this sector. 46 people were employed in the secondary sector and there were 6 businesses in this sector. 38 people were employed in the tertiary sector, with 7 businesses in this sector.

== Historic Population ==
The historical population is given in the following chart:

== Heritage sites of national significance ==
The Abegg-Stiftung^{(de)} (Abegg Foundation building), the Speicherstöckli and Rümligen Castle are listed as Swiss heritage site of national significance.

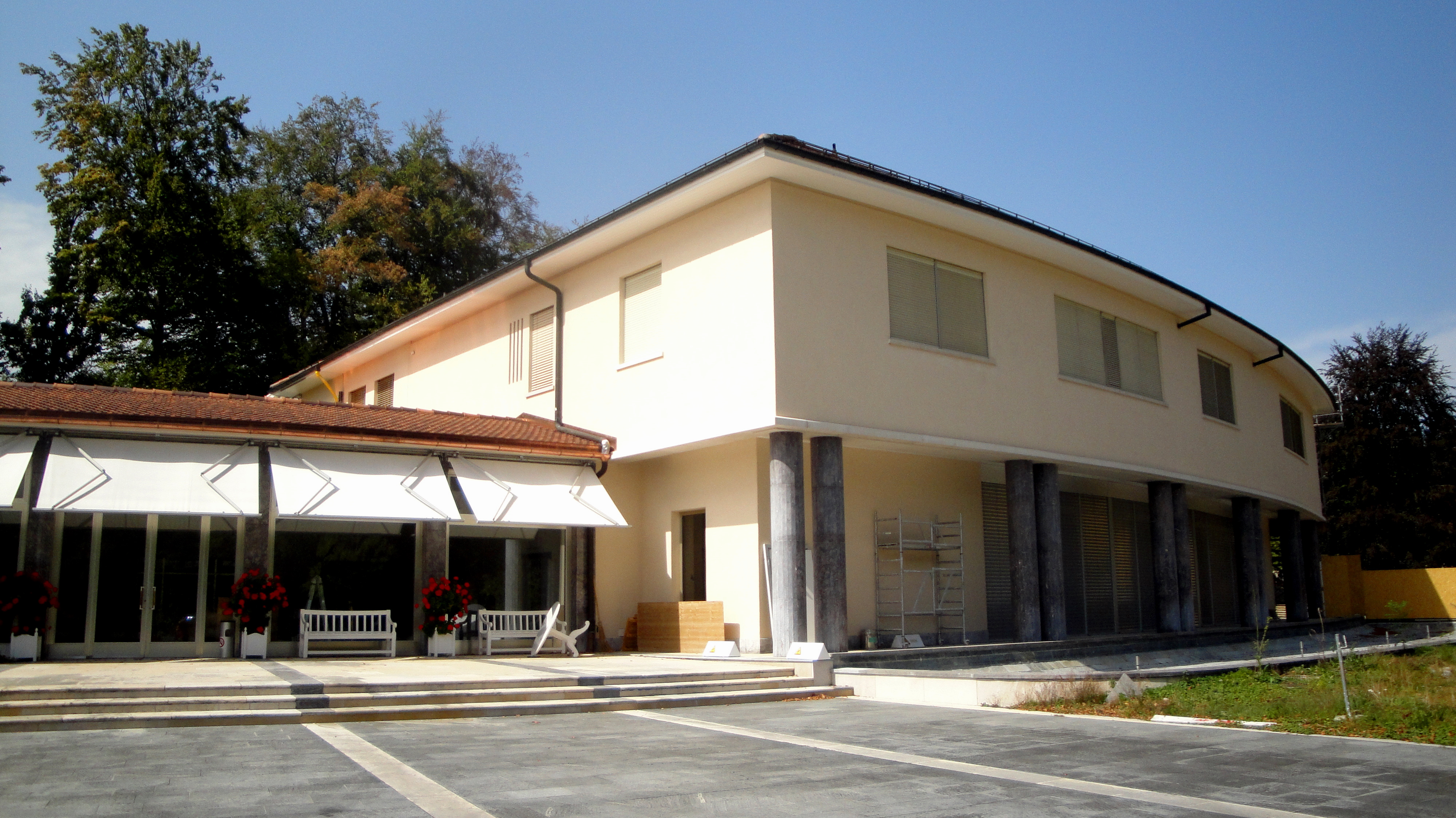
Exterior of the Abegg Foundation building

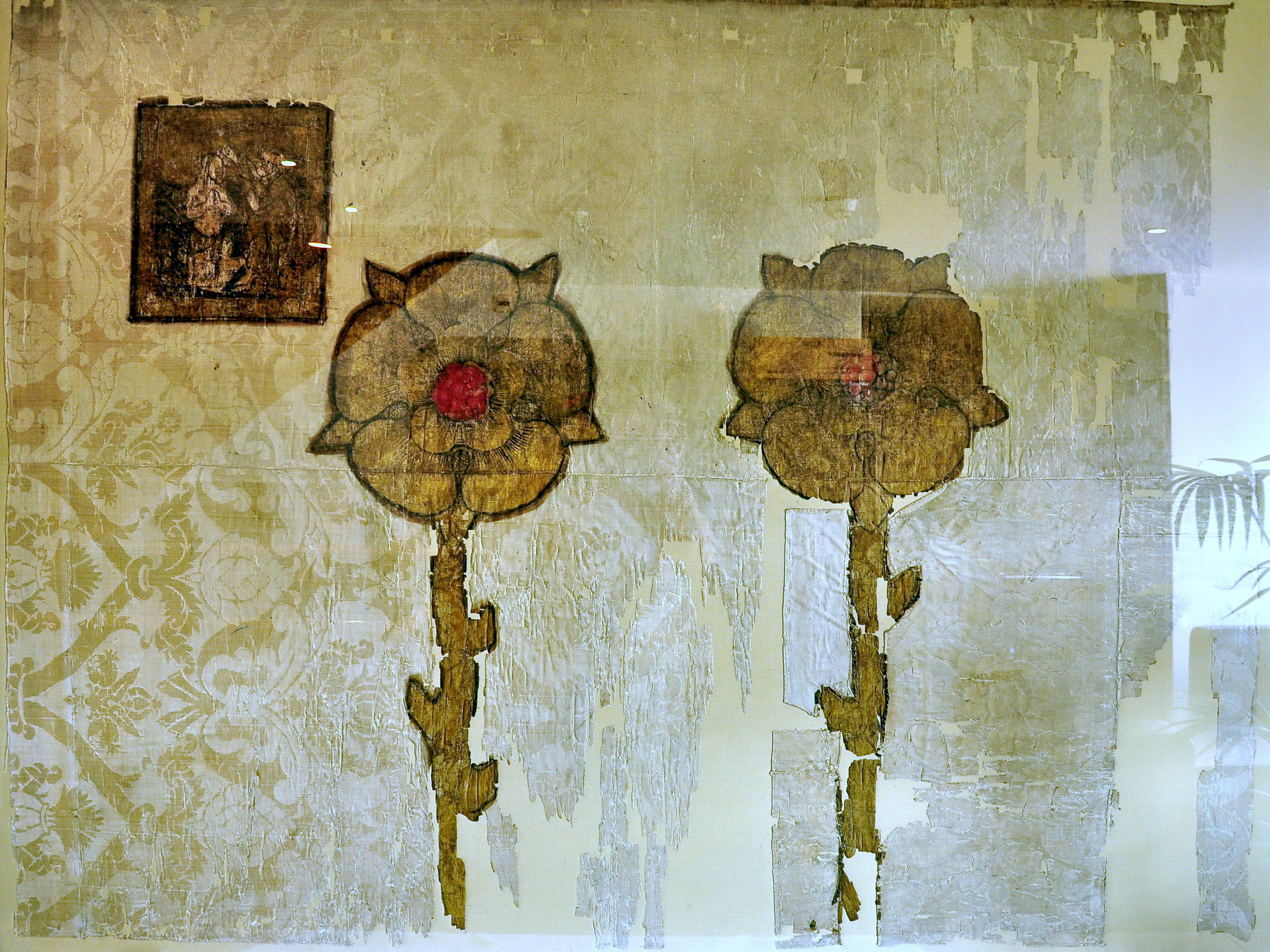
Banner given to mercenaries from Rapperswil by Pope Julius II. Restored in 1993 at the Abegg-Stiftung

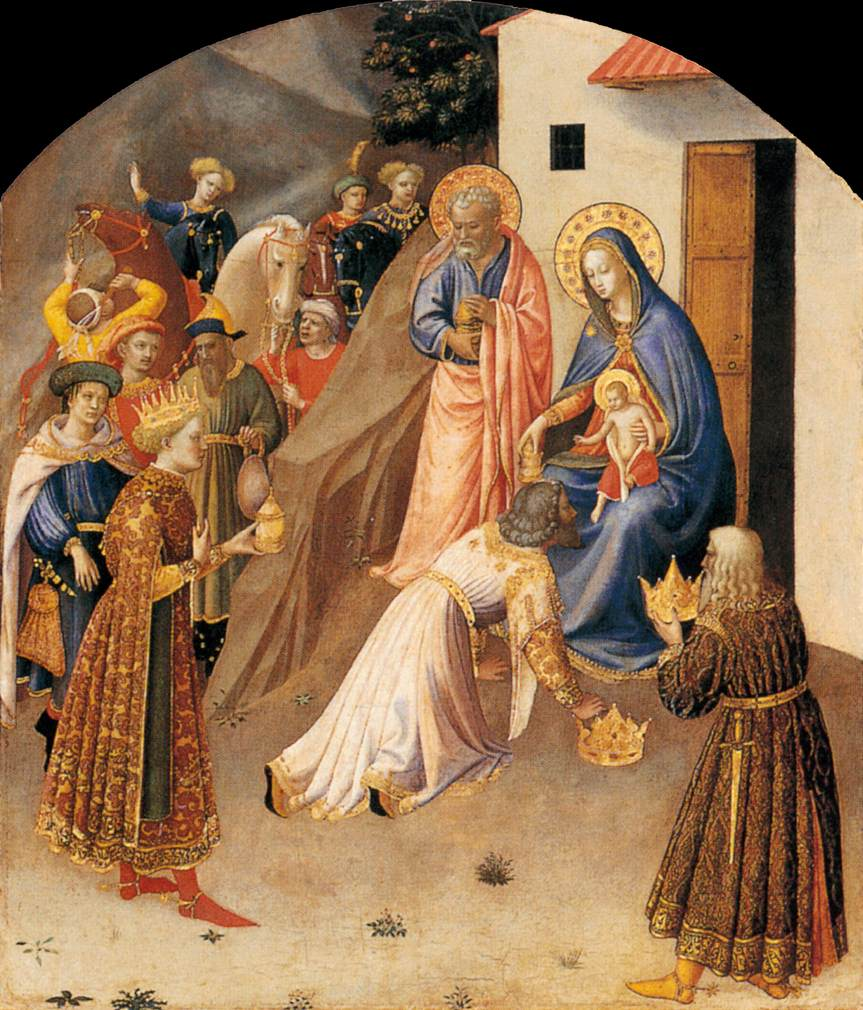
Fra Angelico - Adoration of the Magi from the Abegg collection

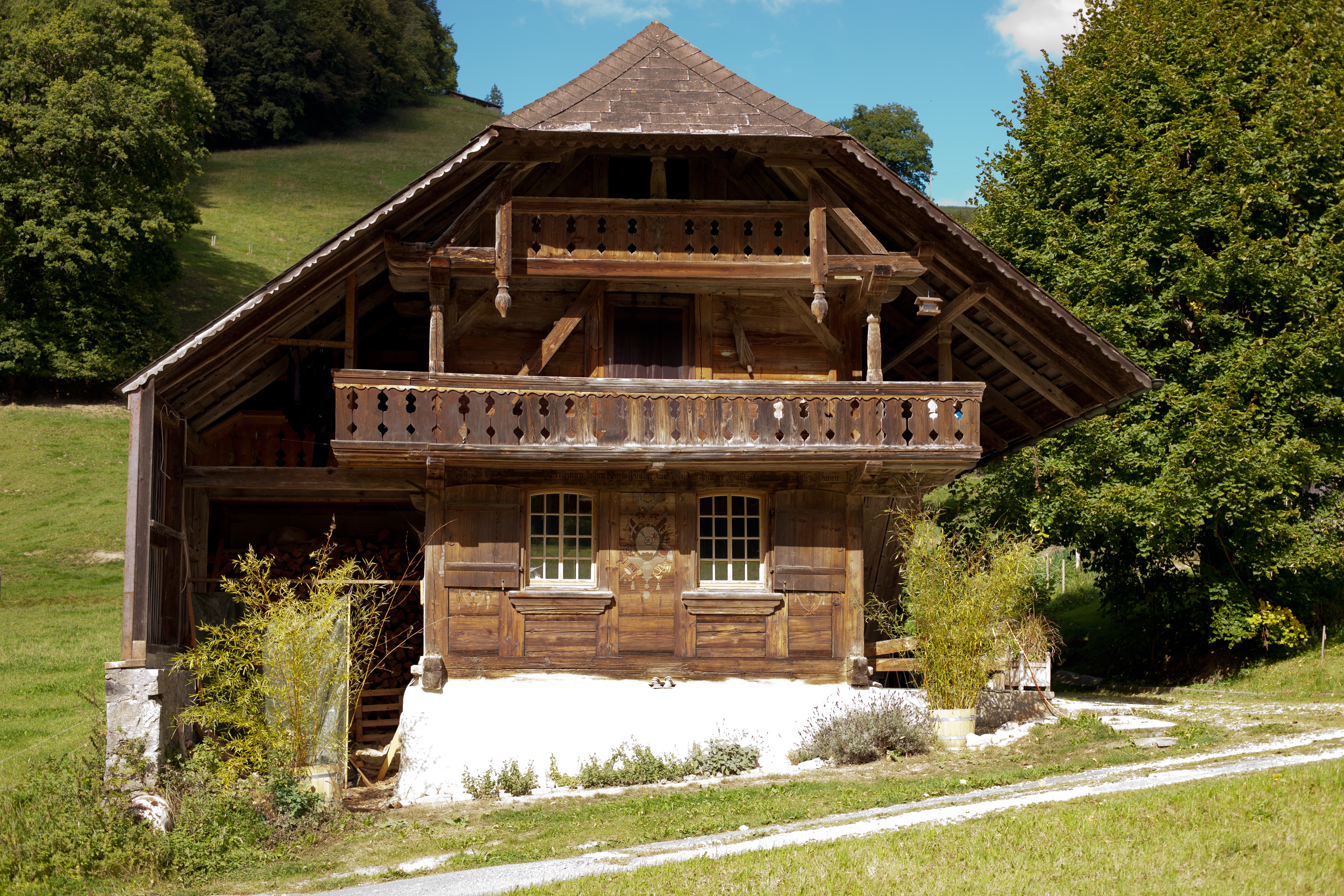
The Speicherstöckli

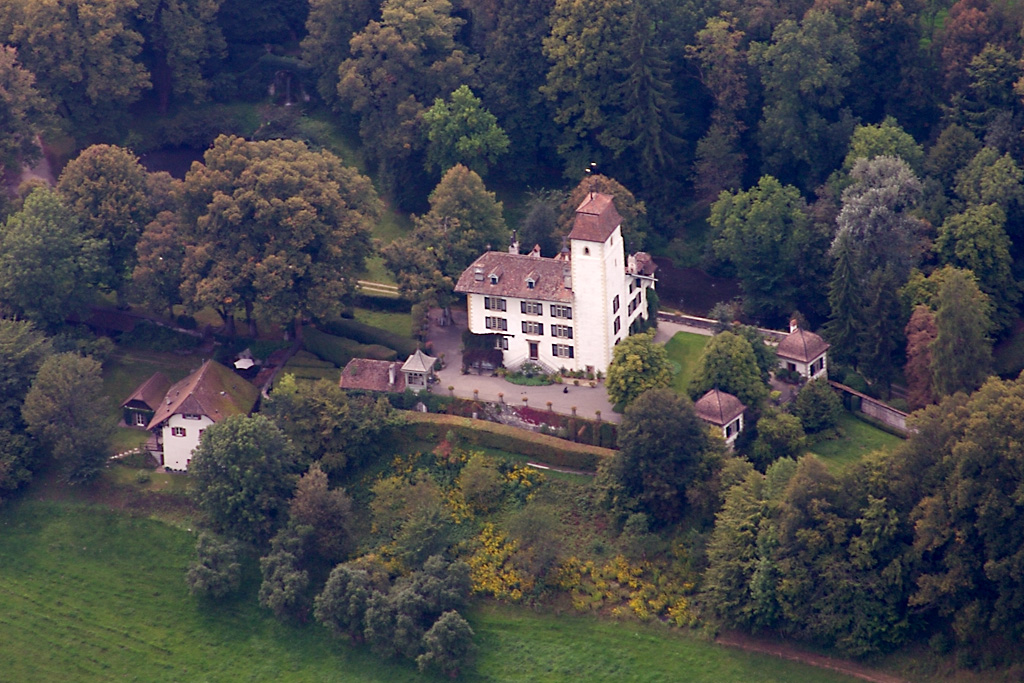
Rümligen Castle

== Politics ==
In the 2011 federal election the most popular party was the Swiss People's Party (SVP) which received 45.9% of the vote. The next three most popular parties were the Conservative Democratic Party (BDP) (17.3%), the Social Democratic Party (SP) (10.6%) and the FDP.The Liberals (6.7%). In the federal election, a total of 922 votes were cast, and the voter turnout was 49.0%.

== Economy ==
As of 2011, Riggisberg had an unemployment rate of 0.73%. As of 2011, there were a total of 1,600 people employed in the municipality. Of these, there were 165 people employed in the primary economic sector and about 61 businesses involved in this sector. 247 people were employed in the secondary sector and there were 51 businesses in this sector. 1,188 people were employed in the tertiary sector, with 124 businesses in this sector. There were 1,043 residents of the municipality who were employed in some capacity, of which females made up 44.5% of the workforce.

In 2008 there were a total of 891 full-time equivalent jobs. The number of jobs in the primary sector was 55, all of which were in agriculture. The number of jobs in the secondary sector was 116 of which 29 or (25.0%) were in manufacturing, 25 or (21.6%) were in mining and 62 (53.4%) were in construction. The number of jobs in the tertiary sector was 720. In the tertiary sector; 113 or 15.7% were in wholesale or retail sales or the repair of motor vehicles, 46 or 6.4% were in the movement and storage of goods, 11 or 1.5% were in a hotel or restaurant, 14 or 1.9% were the insurance or financial industry, 20 or 2.8% were technical professionals or scientists, 29 or 4.0% were in education and 409 or 56.8% were in health care.

In 2000, there were 644 workers who commuted into the municipality and 506 workers who commuted away. The municipality is a net importer of workers, with about 1.3 workers entering the municipality for every one leaving. A total of 537 workers (45.5% of the 1,181 total workers in the municipality) both lived and worked in Riggisberg. Of the working population, 11.5% used public transportation to get to work, and 49% used a private car.

In 2011 the average local and cantonal tax rate on a married resident, with two children, of Riggisberg making 150,000 CHF was 12.7%, while an unmarried resident's rate was 18.7%. For comparison, the average rate for the entire canton in the same year, was 14.2% and 22.0%, while the nationwide average was 12.3% and 21.1% respectively.

In 2009 there were a total of 1,021 tax payers in the municipality. Of that total, 324 made over 75,000 CHF per year. There were 10 people who made between 15,000 and 20,000 per year. The average income of the over 75,000 CHF group in Riggisberg was 115,048 CHF, while the average across all of Switzerland was 130,478 CHF.

In 2011 a total of 2.0% of the population received direct financial assistance from the government.

== Religion ==
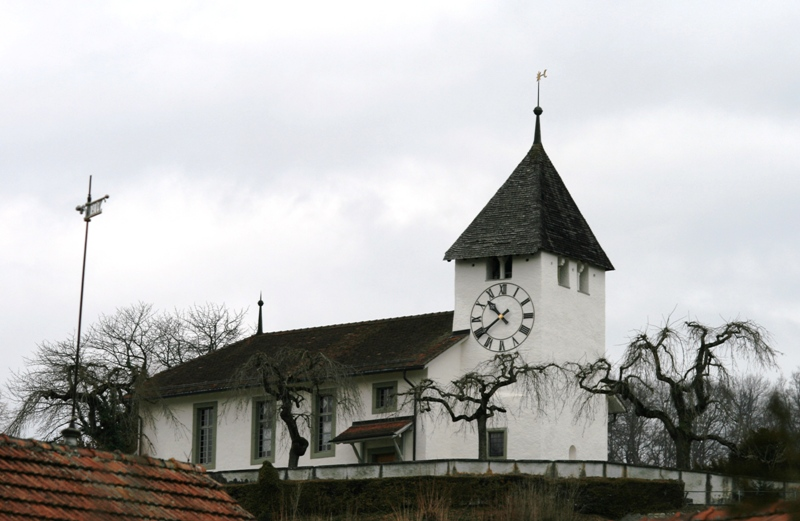
Swiss Reformed church in Riggisberg

From the 2000 census, 1,708 or 79.0% belonged to the Swiss Reformed Church, while 139 or 6.4% were Roman Catholic. Of the rest of the population, there were 8 members of an Orthodox church (or about 0.37% of the population), there were 2 individuals (or about 0.09% of the population) who belonged to the Christian Catholic Church, and there were 47 individuals (or about 2.17% of the population) who belonged to another Christian church. There were 2 individuals (or about 0.09% of the population) who were Jewish, and 84 (or about 3.89% of the population) who were Muslim. There were 26 individuals who were Hindu. 97 (or about 4.49% of the population) belonged to no church, are agnostic or atheist, and 49 individuals (or about 2.27% of the population) did not answer the question.

== Education ==
In Riggisberg about 51.9% of the population have completed non-mandatory upper secondary education, and 15.6% have completed additional higher education (either university or a Fachhochschule). Of the 217 who had completed some form of tertiary schooling listed in the census, 71.0% were Swiss men, 19.8% were Swiss women, 4.6% were non-Swiss men and 4.6% were non-Swiss women.

The Canton of Bern school system provides one year of non-obligatory Kindergarten, followed by six years of Primary school. This is followed by three years of obligatory lower Secondary school where the students are separated according to ability and aptitude. Following the lower Secondary students may attend additional schooling or they may enter an apprenticeship.

During the 2011-12 school year, there were a total of 359 students attending classes in Riggisberg. There were 2 kindergarten classes with a total of 42 students in the municipality. Of the kindergarten students, 7.1% were permanent or temporary residents of Switzerland (not citizens) and 9.5% have a different mother language than the classroom language. The municipality had 8 primary classes and 146 students. Of the primary students, 2.7% were permanent or temporary residents of Switzerland (not citizens) and 4.8% have a different mother language than the classroom language. During the same year, there were 9 lower secondary classes with a total of 171 students. There were 2.3% who were permanent or temporary residents of Switzerland (not citizens) and 5.3% have a different mother language than the classroom language.

As of 2000, there were a total of 352 students attending any school in the municipality. Of those, 227 both lived and attended school in the municipality, while 125 students came from another municipality. During the same year, 53 residents attended schools outside the municipality.

Riggisberg is home to the Bibliothek Riggisberg library. The library has (as of 2008) 8,032 books or other media, and loaned out 19,844 items in the same year. It was open a total of 200 days with average of 8 hours per week during that year.
