= Thurm =

Thurm is a surname. Notable people with the surname include:

- Fritz Thurm (1883–1937), German politician and resistance fighter
- Marian Thurm (born 1952), American author of short stories and novels

== See also ==
- Thurm., taxonomic author abbreviation of Jules Thurmann (1804–1855), Alsatian French-Swiss geologist and botanist
