= Interlaken Monastery =

Convent of the Augustinian Canons Regular

- Kloster Interlaken
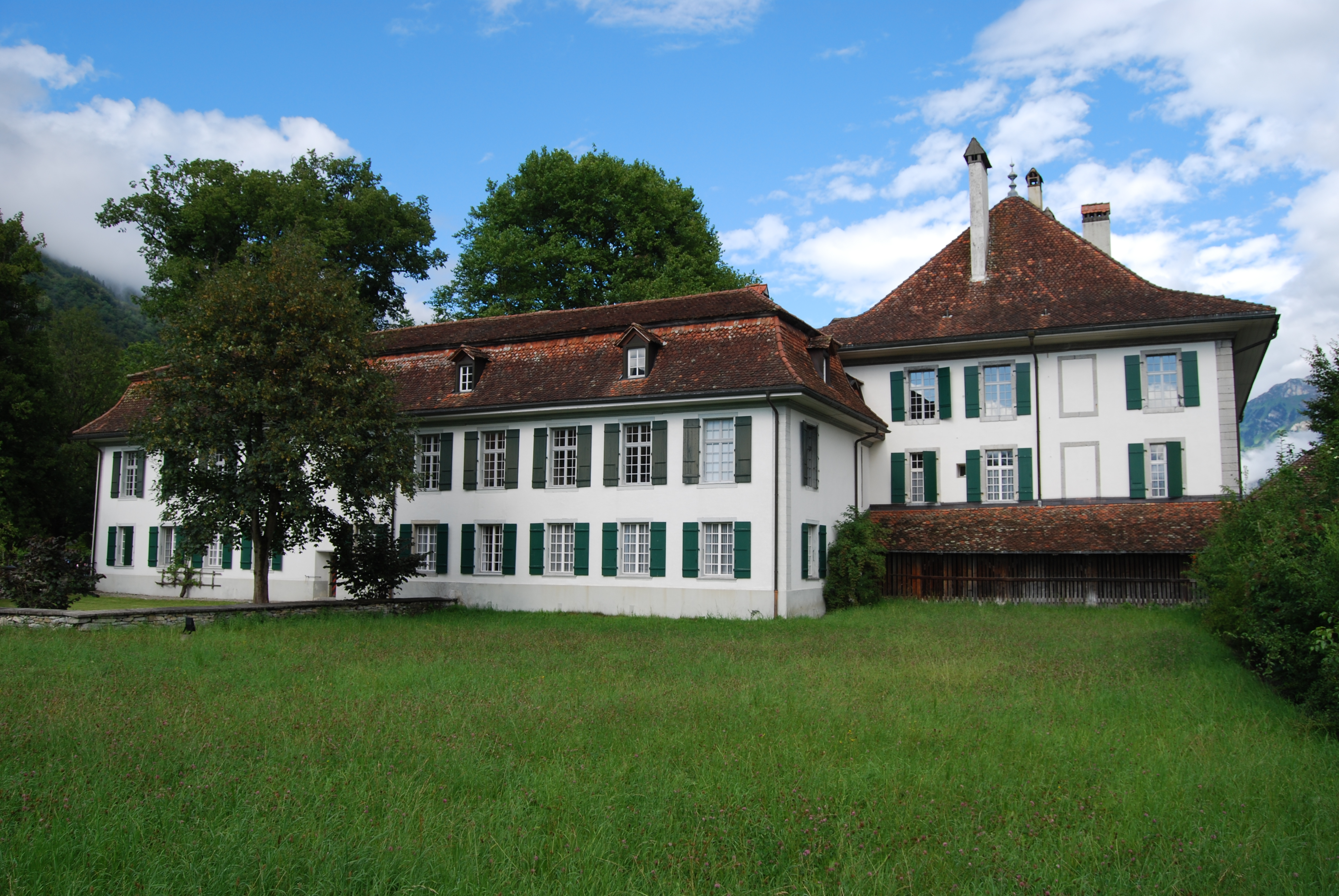
- Interlaken Castle, incorporating parts of the monastery

- Location within Canton of Bern Location within Switzerland
- Interactive map of Interlaken Monastery

Monastery information
- Other name: German: Augustinerchorherrenstift mit angegliedertem Frauenkonvent
- Order: Augustinians
- Established: by 1133
- Disestablished: 1528
- Diocese: Lausanne

People
- Founder: Baron Seliger of Oberhofen

Architecture
- Heritage designation: Swiss heritage site of national significance

Site
- Location: Interlaken
- Coordinates: 46.686949°N 7.8638°E
- Visible remains: Part of Interlaken Castle, used for municipal government offices

Interlaken Monastery (German: Kloster Interlaken or German: Augustinerchorherrenstift) was a convent of the Augustinian Canons Regular (German: Augustinerchorherren) from about 1133 until 1528 at Interlaken in the canton of Bern in Switzerland. It is a Swiss heritage site of national significance.

== History ==
The provost of the Monastery was first mentioned in 1133 when Holy Roman Emperor Lothair took the Monastery, founded by Baron Seliger of Oberhofen, under his protection. The Monastery was part of the diocese of Lausanne. According to the deed of 1133, the members of the Monastery were allowed to choose their own provost and kastvogt or bailiff over a religious institution. During the 12th century the provosts were confirmed by the bishop as well as by the pope. By 1247, there were also women at the Monastery. During the 12th century the kastvogt office came to the von Eschenbach family. However, in 1308, Walther von Eschenbach helped John Parricida murder John's uncle king Albert I. In 1318, the family lost their position at Interlaken when Albert's son, Duke Leopold I was elected kastvogt. When he died in 1325, the provost and general chapter transferred the office to his brother Albert II. However, the Monastery remained able to choose their own provost and kastvogt. Starting in the 15th century Bern tried to become the patron of the monastery but did not succeed until 1472.

During the 13th century the Monastery's influence spread throughout the neighboring area and into the Aare and Gürbe valleys. They eventually had authority over two dozen churches along with a number of villages and farms and became the largest religious landholder in the region. The greatest density of the estates were held on the eastern end of Lake Thun, around Lake Brienz and in the valleys of Lauterbrunnen and Grindelwald. During the 13th and the beginning of the 14th century the Monastery grew and prospered. However, in 1350 a period of crises and conflicts led to a decline in the number of monks and nuns and increasing debt. A document from 1310, indicates that there were 30 priests, 20 lay brothers and 350 women at the Monastery. In contrast, in 1472 there were only the provost, the prior, nine ordinary canons, seven novices and 27 nuns. At this time, the Monastery also had problems with its tenants and neighbors. In 1348, the people of Grindelwald and Wilderswil joined a mutual defense league with Unterwalden. Bern responded with a military expedition to the Bernese Oberland, which ended in defeat for Unterwalden and its allies. In 1445 the Evil League (Böser Bund) rose up in the Oberland near Interlaken and fought against Bernese military service and taxes following the Old Zürich War.

During the 14th century the canons and nuns stopped following most of the monastic rules. In 1472 a violent dispute between the men and the women's convents resulted in two visitations by the Bishop of Lausanne who noted serious deficiencies. The provost was arrested and some of the canons were replaced by canons from other convents. Despite the reform measures the nun's convent was closed in 1484 and its property transferred to the newly founded monastery of St. Vincent in Bern.

During the Protestant Reformation, the Monastery was secularized in 1528. The canons received a financial settlement and the properties were now managed by a Bernese bailiff. The tenants of the Monastery who had expected the abolition of all owed interest, responded by rioting, which was suppressed by Bern.

After the Reformation, Bern created the Interlaken bailiwick from the Monastery lands. Part of the Monastery building was used as the headquarters of the district administration, while the rest was used as an indigent hospital. In 1562-63 Bern converted the Monastery church's choir into a granary and a wine cellar. In 1746-50 the west wing was demolished and Governor Samuel Tillier built the so-called new castle. It has remained the center of administration for the Interlaken district since that time.
