= Büren zum Hof railway station =

Railway station in Fraubrunnen, Switzerland

Büren zum Hof
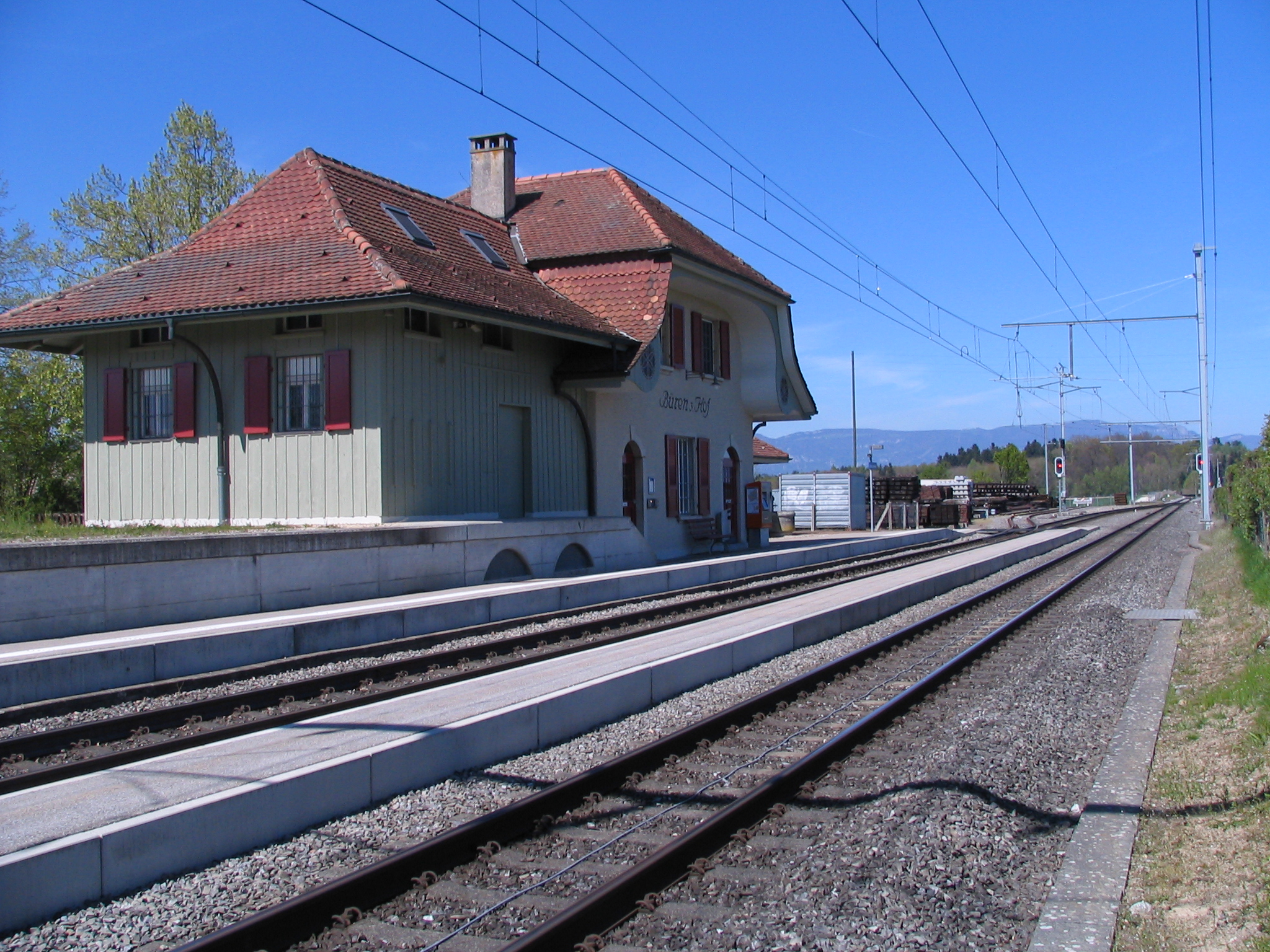
- The station platforms in 2014

General information
- Location: Fraubrunnen; Switzerland
- Coordinates: 47°05′46″N 7°31′08″E
- Elevation: 506 m (1,660 ft)
- Owner: Regionalverkehr Bern-Solothurn
- Line: Solothurn–Worblaufen line
- Distance: 14.0 km (8.7 mi) from Solothurn
- Platforms: 2 side platforms
- Tracks: 2
- Train operators: Regionalverkehr Bern-Solothurn

Construction
- Accessible: Yes

Other information
- Station code: 8508062 (BUHO)
- Fare zone: 228 (Libero)

History
- Opened: 10 April 1916

Services
Preceding station	Bern S-Bahn	Following station
Fraubrunnen towards Bern	S8	Schalunen towards Bätterkinden
Location

Büren zum Hof railway station (German: Bahnhof Büren zum Hof) is located in the municipality of Fraubrunnen in the Swiss canton of Bern. It serves as an intermediate stop on the 1,000 mm (3 ft 3 3/8 in) gauge Solothurn–Worblaufen line of Regionalverkehr Bern-Solothurn.

== Services ==
As of the December 2024 timetable change, the following services stop at Büren zum Hof:

- Bern S-Bahn S8: half-hourly service between Bern and Bätterkinden.
