= Grafenried railway station =

Railway station in Fraubrunnen, Switzerland

Grafenried
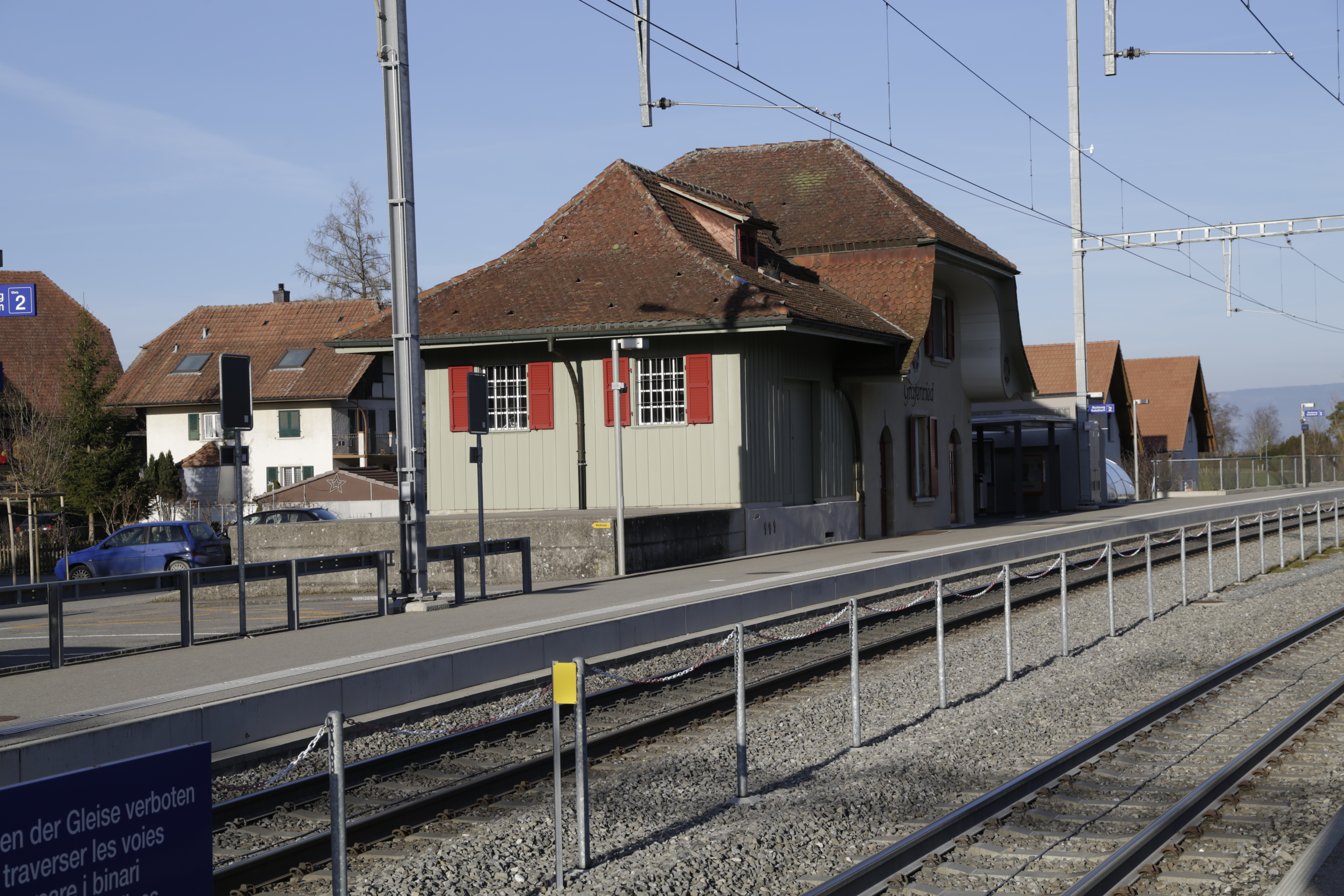
- The station in 2015

General information
- Location: Fraubrunnen; Switzerland
- Coordinates: 47°04′48″N 7°30′43″E
- Elevation: 518 m (1,699 ft)
- Owner: Regionalverkehr Bern-Solothurn
- Line: Solothurn–Worblaufen line
- Distance: 16.3 km (10.1 mi) from Solothurn
- Platforms: 2 side platforms
- Tracks: 2
- Train operators: Regionalverkehr Bern-Solothurn

Construction
- Accessible: Yes

Other information
- Station code: 8508060 (GRRI)
- Fare zone: 228 (Libero)

History
- Opened: 10 April 1916

Services
Preceding station	Bern S-Bahn	Following station
Jegenstorf towards Bern	S8	Fraubrunnen towards Bätterkinden
Location

Grafenried railway station (German: Bahnhof Grafenried) is a railway station in the municipality of Fraubrunnen, in the Swiss canton of Bern. It is an intermediate stop on the 1,000 mm (3 ft 3 3/8 in) gauge Solothurn–Worblaufen line of Regionalverkehr Bern-Solothurn.

== Services ==
As of the December 2024 timetable change, the following services stop at Grafenried:

- Bern S-Bahn S8: half-hourly service between Bern and Bätterkinden.
