= Schönbühl RBS railway station =

Railway station in Urtenen-Schönbühl, Switzerland

Schönbühl RBS
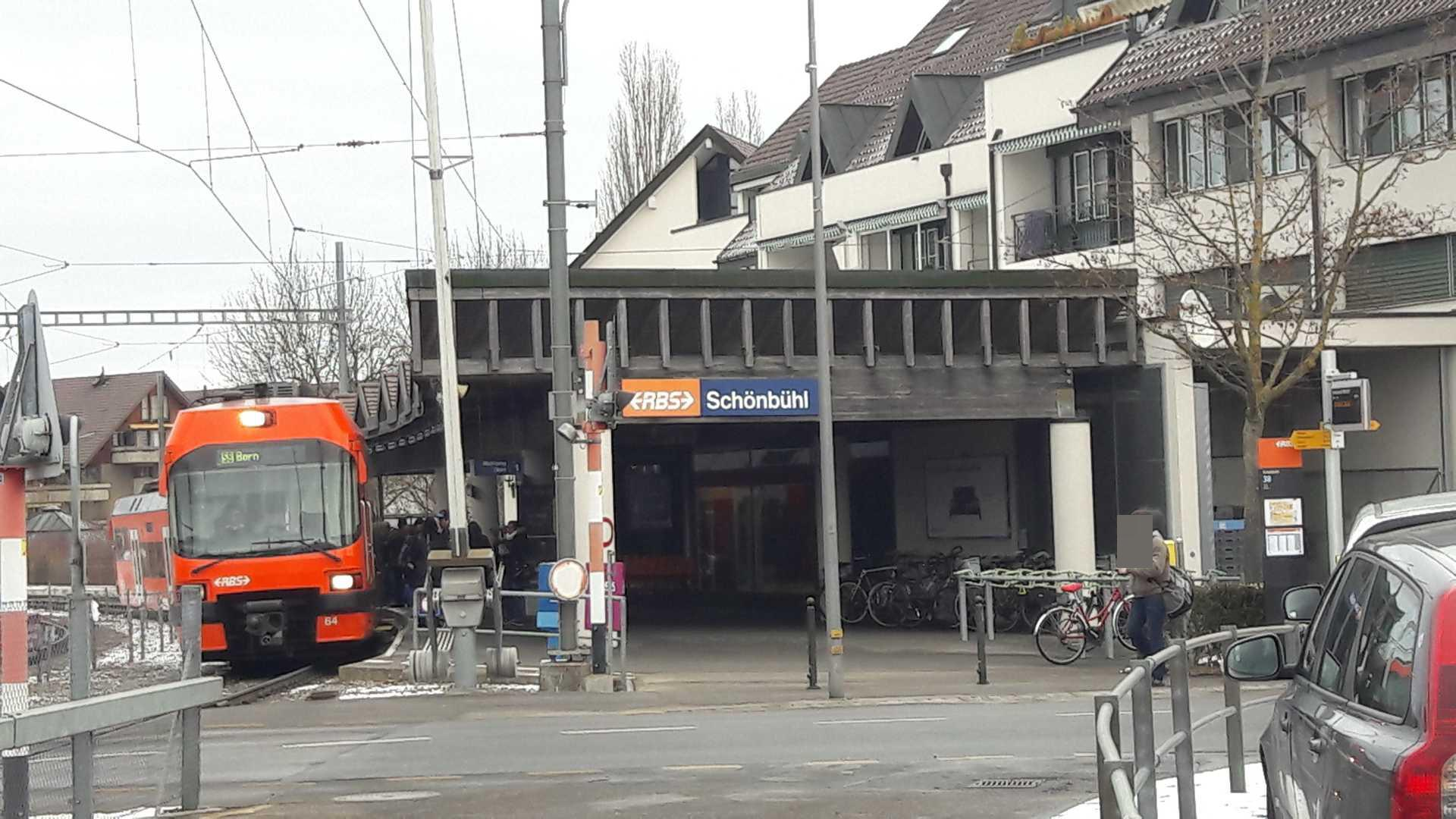
- RBS train at the station in 2018

General information
- Location: Urtenen-Schönbühl; Switzerland
- Coordinates: 47°01′12″N 7°29′53″E
- Elevation: 526 m (1,726 ft)
- Owner: Regionalverkehr Bern-Solothurn
- Line: Solothurn–Worblaufen line
- Distance: 23.2 km (14.4 mi) from Solothurn
- Platforms: 2 side platforms
- Tracks: 2
- Train operators: Regionalverkehr Bern-Solothurn
- Connections: RBS buses

Construction
- Accessible: Yes

Other information
- Station code: 8508057 (SCBS)
- Fare zone: 114 (Libero)

Services
Preceding station	Bern S-Bahn	Following station
Schönbühl Shoppyland towards Bern	S8	Urtenen towards Jegenstorf or Bätterkinden
Location

Schönbühl RBS railway station (German: Bahnhof Schönbühl RBS) is a railway station in the municipality of Urtenen-Schönbühl, in the Swiss canton of Bern. It is an intermediate stop on the 1,000 mm (3 ft 3 3/8 in) gauge Solothurn–Worblaufen line of Regionalverkehr Bern-Solothurn. The station is approximately 290 metres (950 ft) north of Schönbühl SBB on the standard gauge Olten–Bern line of Swiss Federal Railways.

== Services ==
The following services stop at Schönbühl RBS:

- Bern S-Bahn S8: service every fifteen minutes between Bern and Jegenstorf, half-hourly service from Jegenstorf to Bätterkinden.
