= Schönbühl Shoppyland railway station =

Railway station in Urtenen-Schönbühl, Switzerland

Schönbühl Shoppyland
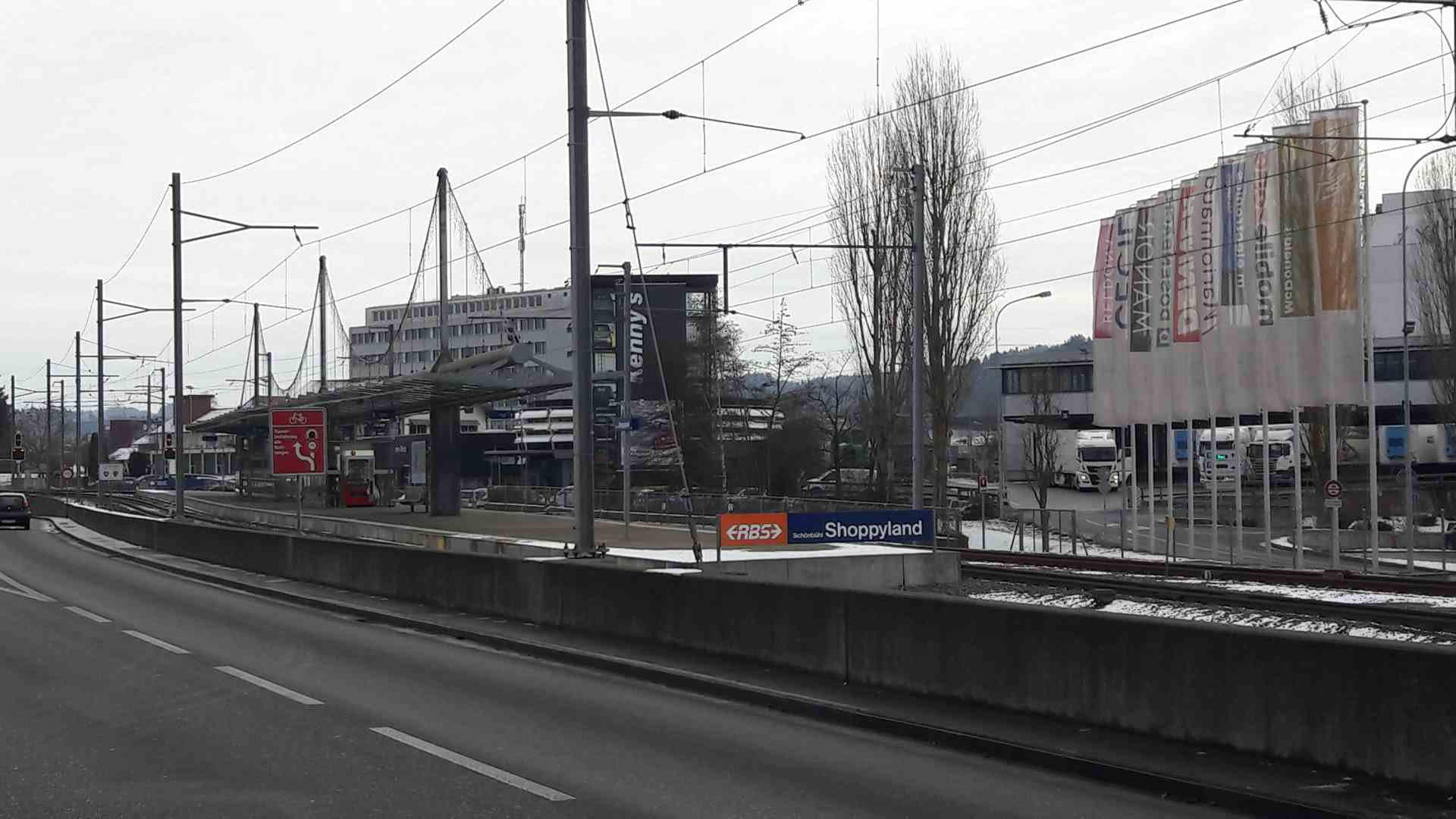
- The station platform in 2018

General information
- Location: Moosseedorf; Switzerland
- Coordinates: 47°01′08″N 7°29′38″E
- Elevation: 526 m (1,726 ft)
- Owner: Regionalverkehr Bern-Solothurn
- Line: Solothurn–Worblaufen line
- Distance: 23.6 km (14.7 mi) from Solothurn
- Platforms: 2 (1 island platform)
- Tracks: 2
- Train operators: Regionalverkehr Bern-Solothurn

Construction
- Accessible: Yes

Other information
- Station code: 8508071 (SCSH)
- Fare zone: 114 (Libero)

Services
Preceding station	Bern S-Bahn	Following station
Moosseedorf towards Bern	S8	Schönbühl RBS towards Jegenstorf or Bätterkinden
Location

Schönbühl Shoppyland railway station (German: Bahnhof Schönbühl Shoppyland) is a railway station in the municipality of Moosseedorf, in the Swiss canton of Bern. It is an intermediate stop on the 1,000 mm (3 ft 3 3/8 in) gauge Solothurn–Worblaufen line of Regionalverkehr Bern-Solothurn. The station serves the Shoppyland Schönbühl shopping center.

== Services ==
The following services stop at Schönbühl Shoppyland:

- Bern S-Bahn S8: service every fifteen minutes between Bern and Jegenstorf, half-hourly service from Jegenstorf to Bätterkinden.
