= Moosseedorf railway station =

Railway station in Moosseedorf, Switzerland

Moosseedorf
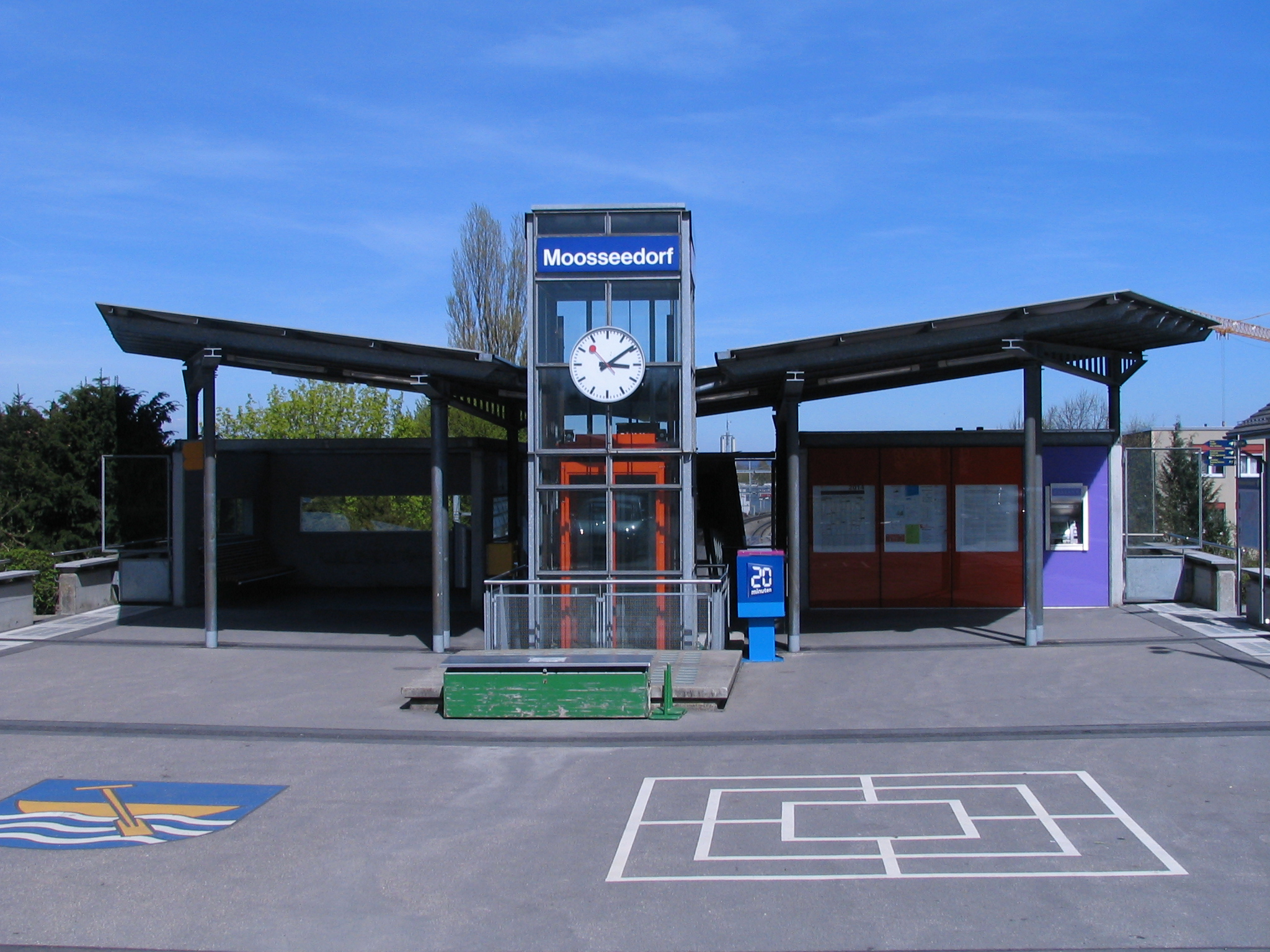
- The station entrance in 2014

General information
- Location: Moosseedorf; Switzerland
- Coordinates: 47°00′58″N 7°29′06″E
- Elevation: 532 m (1,745 ft)
- Owner: Regionalverkehr Bern-Solothurn
- Line: Solothurn–Worblaufen line
- Distance: 24.4 km (15.2 mi) from Solothurn
- Platforms: 2 (1 island platform)
- Tracks: 2
- Train operators: Regionalverkehr Bern-Solothurn

Construction
- Accessible: Yes

Other information
- Station code: 8508056 (MOSE)
- Fare zone: 114 (Libero)

Services
Preceding station	Bern S-Bahn	Following station
Zollikofen towards Bern	S8	Schönbühl Shoppyland towards Jegenstorf or Bätterkinden
Location

Moosseedorf railway station (German: Bahnhof Moosseedorf) is a railway station in the municipality of Moosseedorf, in the Swiss canton of Bern. It is an intermediate stop on the 1,000 mm (3 ft 3 3/8 in) gauge Solothurn–Worblaufen line of Regionalverkehr Bern-Solothurn.

== Services ==
The following services stop at Moosseedorf:

- Bern S-Bahn S8: service every fifteen minutes between Bern and Jegenstorf, half-hourly service from Jegenstorf to Bätterkinden.
