= Schalunen railway station =

Railway station in Fraubrunnen, Switzerland

Schalunen
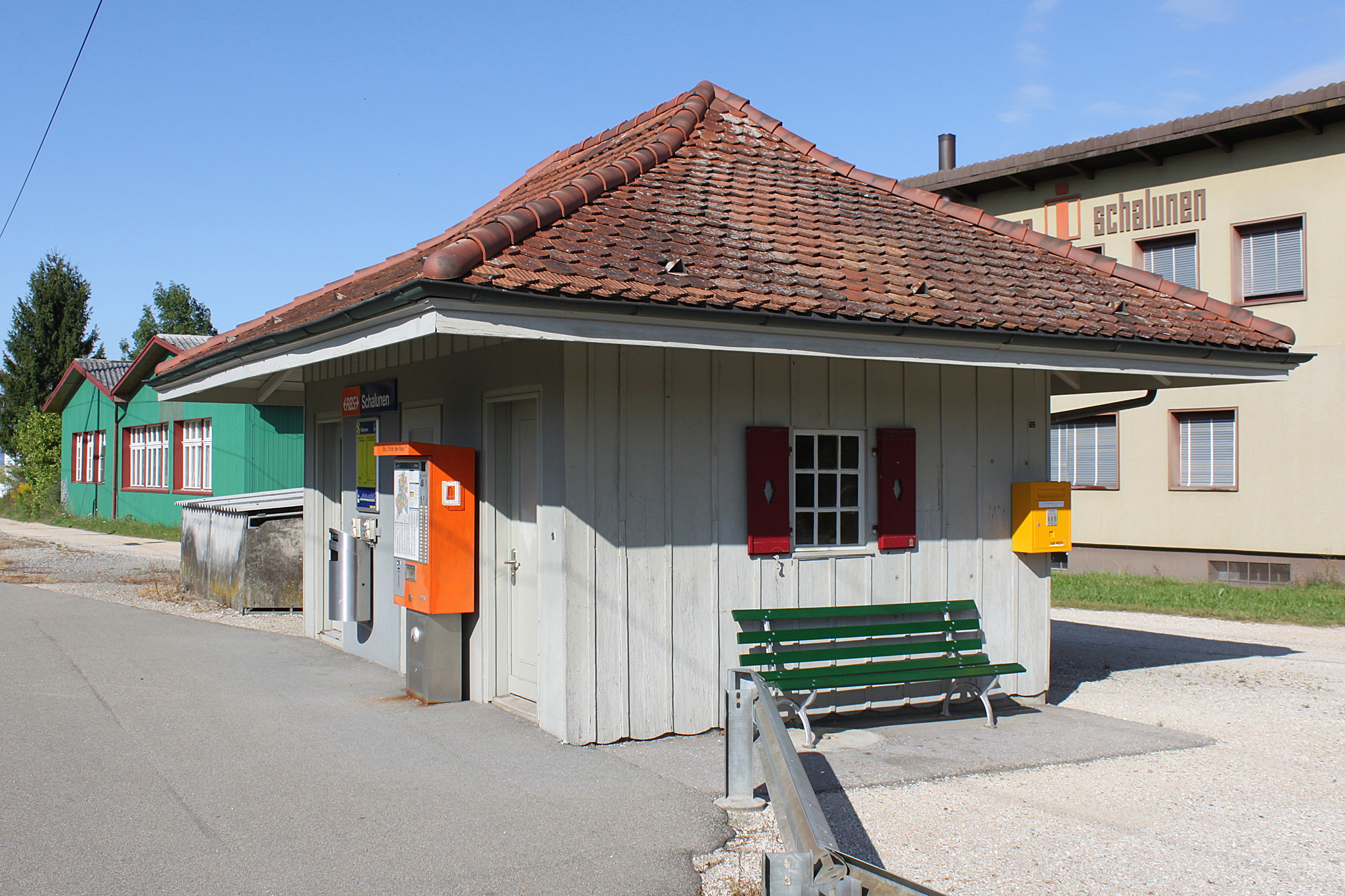
- The station in 2009

General information
- Location: Fraubrunnen; Switzerland
- Coordinates: 47°06′36″N 7°31′26″E
- Elevation: 501 m (1,644 ft)
- Owner: Regionalverkehr Bern-Solothurn
- Line: Solothurn–Worblaufen line
- Distance: 12.3 km (7.6 mi) from Solothurn
- Platforms: 1 side platform
- Tracks: 1
- Train operators: Regionalverkehr Bern-Solothurn

Construction
- Accessible: Yes

Other information
- Station code: 8508063 (SCN)
- Fare zone: 218 (Libero)

History
- Opened: 10 April 1916

Services
Preceding station	Bern S-Bahn	Following station
Büren zum Hof towards Bern	S8	Bätterkinden Terminus
Location

Schalunen railway station (German: Bahnhof Schalunen) is a railway station in the municipality of Fraubrunnen, in the Swiss canton of Bern. It is an intermediate stop on the 1,000 mm (3 ft 3 3/8 in) gauge Solothurn–Worblaufen line of Regionalverkehr Bern-Solothurn.

== Services ==
As of the December 2024 timetable change, the following services stop at Schalunen:

- Bern S-Bahn S8: half-hourly service between Bern and Bätterkinden.
