= Urtenen railway station =

Railway station in Urtenen-Schönbühl, Switzerland

Urtenen
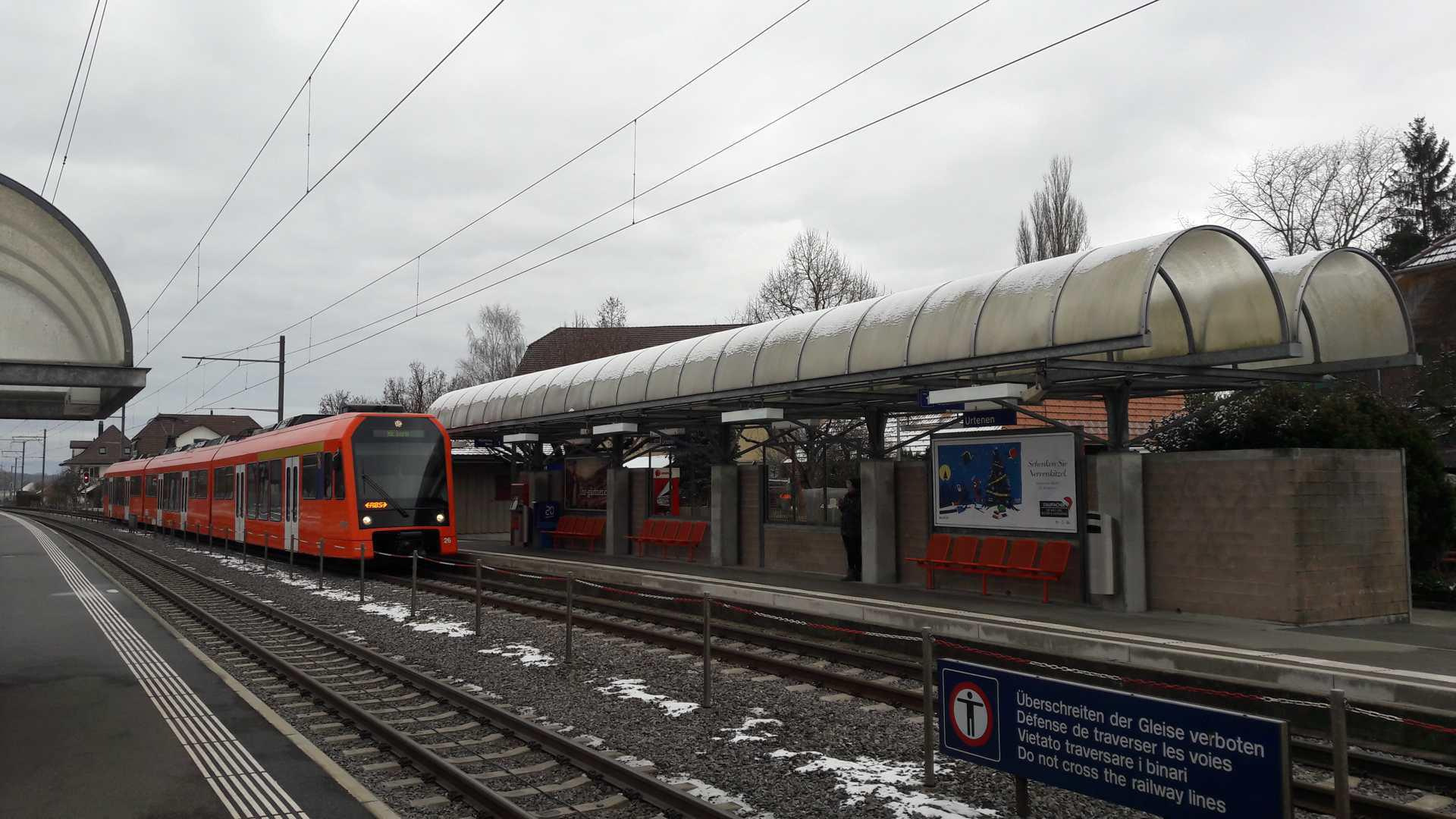
- RBS train at the station in 2018

General information
- Location: Urtenen-Schönbühl; Switzerland
- Coordinates: 47°01′44″N 7°30′04″E
- Elevation: 528 m (1,732 ft)
- Owner: Regionalverkehr Bern-Solothurn
- Line: Solothurn–Worblaufen line
- Distance: 22.2 km (13.8 mi) from Solothurn
- Platforms: 2 side platforms
- Tracks: 2
- Train operators: Regionalverkehr Bern-Solothurn

Construction
- Accessible: Yes

Other information
- Station code: 8508058 (URTN)
- Fare zone: 114 (Libero)

Services
Preceding station	Bern S-Bahn	Following station
Schönbühl RBS towards Bern	S8	Jegenstorf towards Bätterkinden
Schönbühl RBS towards Bern	S8	Jegenstorf Terminus
Location

Urtenen railway station (German: Bahnhof Urtenen) is a railway station in the municipality of Urtenen-Schönbühl, in the Swiss canton of Bern. It is an intermediate stop on the 1,000 mm (3 ft 3 3/8 in) gauge Solothurn–Worblaufen line of Regionalverkehr Bern-Solothurn.

== Services ==
The following services stop at Urtenen:

- Bern S-Bahn S8: service every fifteen minutes between Bern and Jegenstorf, half-hourly service from Jegenstorf to Bätterkinden.
