= Fraubrunnen railway station =

Railway station in Fraubrunnen, Switzerland

Fraubrunnen
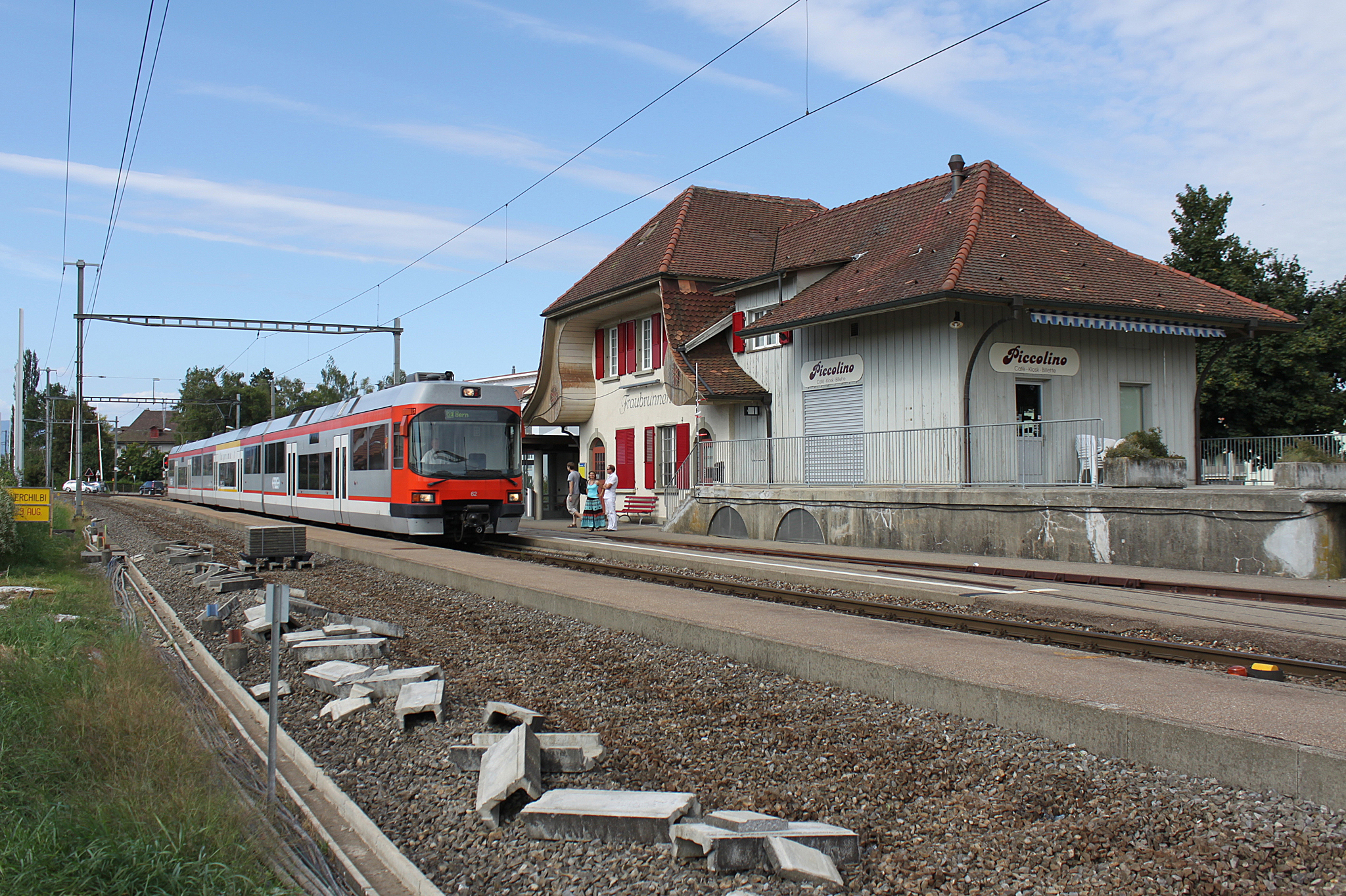
- A RBS train at the station in 2009

General information
- Location: Fraubrunnen; Switzerland
- Coordinates: 47°05′10″N 7°31′19″E
- Elevation: 496 m (1,627 ft)
- Owner: Regionalverkehr Bern-Solothurn
- Line: Solothurn–Worblaufen line
- Distance: 15.1 km (9.4 mi) from Solothurn
- Platforms: 2 side platforms
- Tracks: 2
- Train operators: Regionalverkehr Bern-Solothurn
- Connections: Busland AG buses

Construction
- Accessible: Yes

Other information
- Station code: 8508061 (FBR)
- Fare zone: 228 (Libero)

History
- Opened: 10 April 1916

Services
| Preceding station | Regionalverkehr Bern-Solothurn | Following station |
|---|---|---|
| Jegenstorf towards Bern | RE5 | Bätterkinden towards Solothurn |
| Preceding station | Bern S-Bahn | Following station |
| Grafenried towards Bern | S8 | Büren zum Hof towards Bätterkinden |
Location

Fraubrunnen railway station (German: Bahnhof Fraubrunnen) is a railway station in the municipality of Fraubrunnen, in the Swiss canton of Bern. It is an intermediate stop on the 1,000 mm (3 ft 3 3/8 in) gauge Solothurn–Worblaufen line of Regionalverkehr Bern-Solothurn.

== Services ==
As of the December 2024 timetable change, the following services stop at Fraubrunnen:

- RegioExpress: half-hourly service between Bern and Solothurn.
- Bern S-Bahn S8: half-hourly service between Bern and Bätterkinden.
