= Lohn-Lüterkofen railway station =

Railway station in Lohn-Ammannsegg, Switzerland

Lohn-Lüterkofen
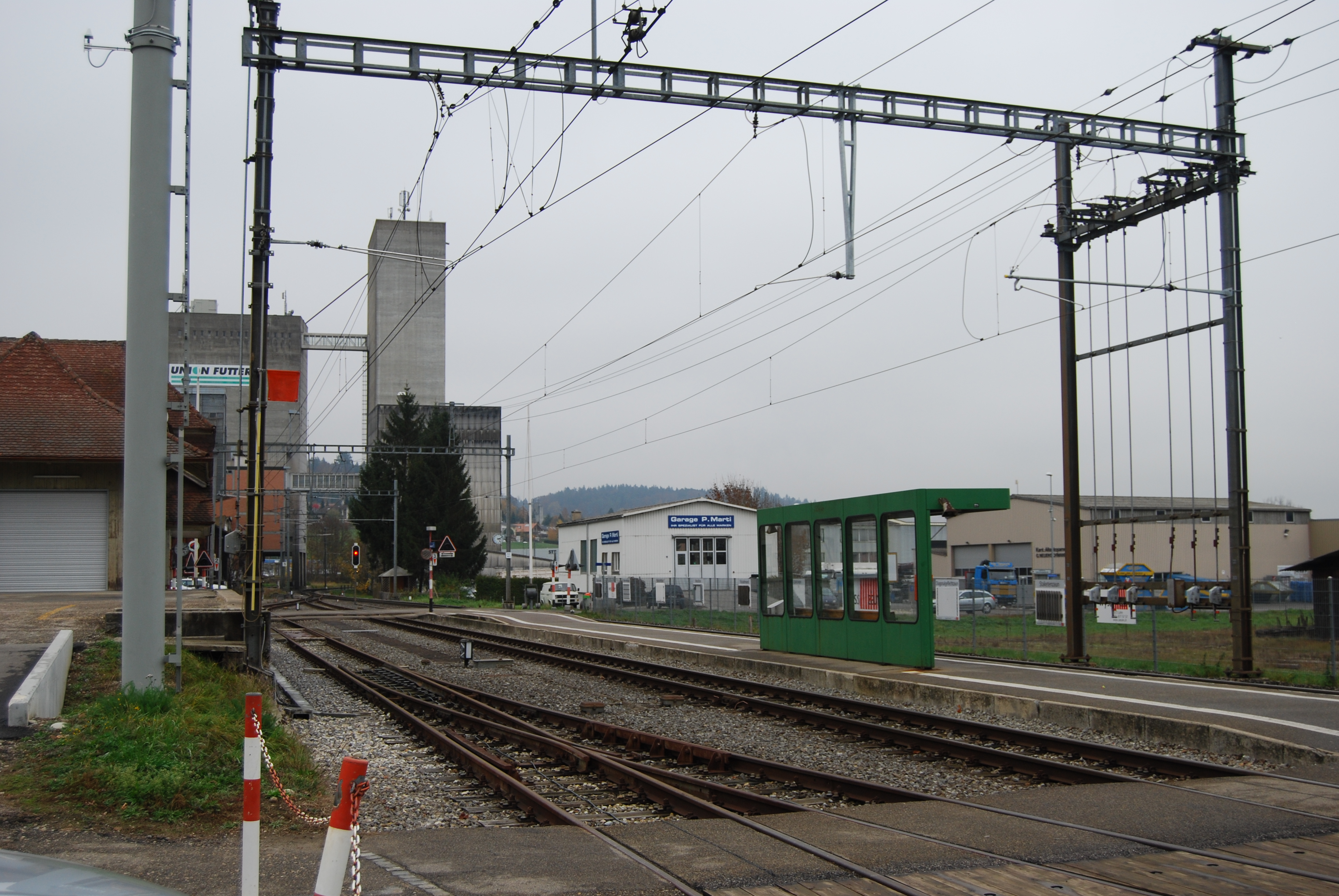
- The station in 2011

General information
- Location: Lohn-Ammannsegg; Switzerland
- Coordinates: 47°09′47″N 7°31′37″E
- Elevation: 464 m (1,522 ft)
- Owner: Regionalverkehr Bern-Solothurn
- Line: Solothurn–Worblaufen line
- Distance: 6.2 km (3.9 mi) from Solothurn
- Platforms: 2 (1 island platform)
- Tracks: 2
- Train operators: Regionalverkehr Bern-Solothurn
- Connections: Busbetrieb Solothurn und Umgebung bus line; PostAuto AG bus lines

Other information
- Station code: 8508066 (LOLU)
- Fare zone: 201 (Libero)

History
- Opened: 10 April 1916

Services
Preceding station	Regionalverkehr Bern-Solothurn	Following station
Bätterkinden towards Bern	RE5	Biberist RBS towards Solothurn
Location

Lohn-Lüterkofen railway station (German: Bahnhof Lohn-Lüterkofen) is a railway station in the municipality of Lohn-Ammannsegg, in the Swiss canton of Solothurn. It is an intermediate stop on the 1,000 mm (3 ft 3 3/8 in) gauge Solothurn–Worblaufen line of Regionalverkehr Bern-Solothurn.

== Services ==
As of the December 2024 timetable change, the following services stop at Lohn-Lüterkofen:

- RegioExpress: half-hourly service or service every fifteen minutes on weekdays between Bern and Solothurn.
