= Biberist RBS railway station =

Railway station in Biberist, Switzerland

Biberist RBS
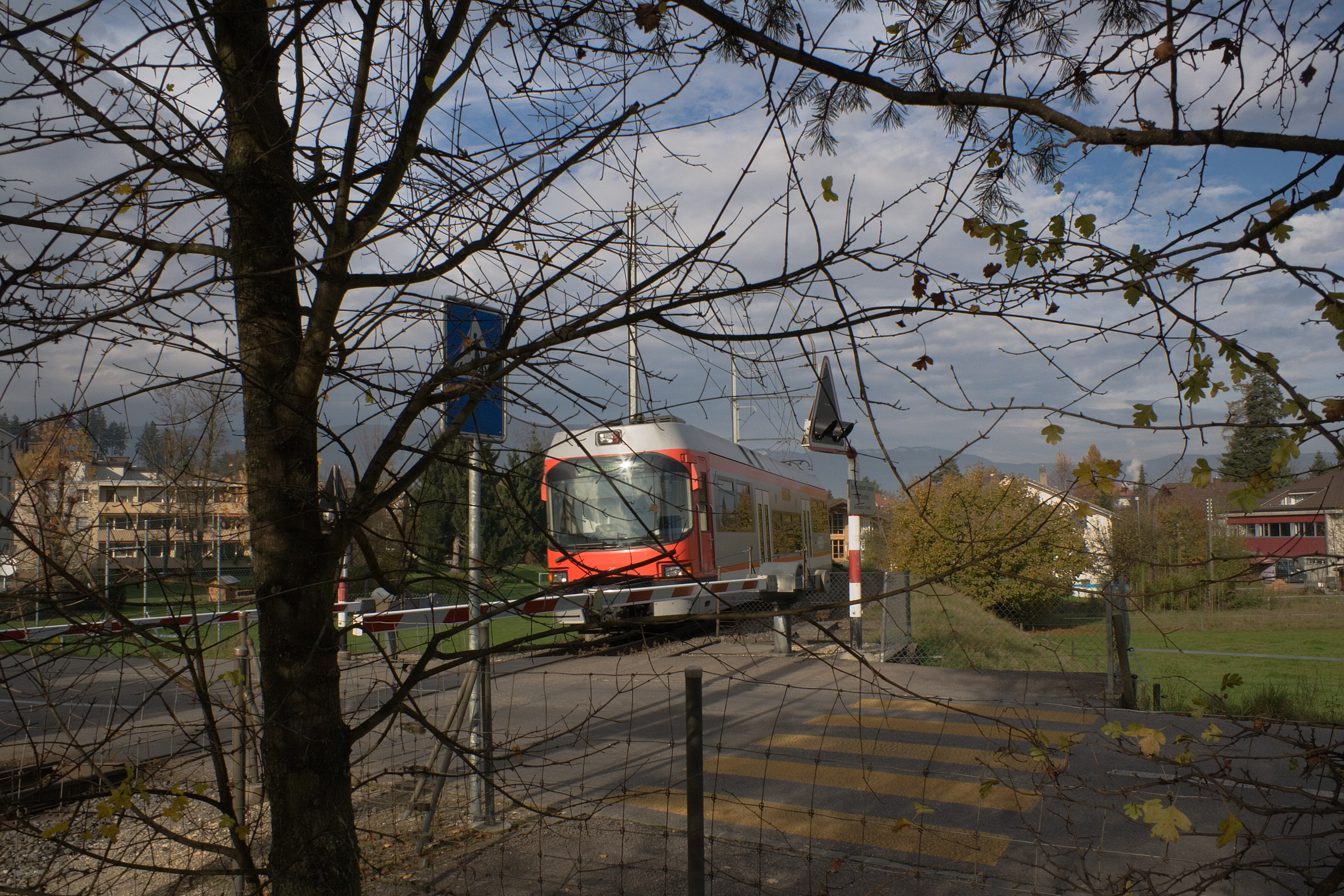

General information
- Location: Biberist; Switzerland
- Coordinates: 47°10′59″N 7°33′18″E
- Elevation: 457 m (1,499 ft)
- Owner: Regionalverkehr Bern-Solothurn
- Line: Solothurn–Worblaufen line
- Distance: 3.0 km (1.9 mi) from Solothurn
- Platforms: 2 side platforms
- Tracks: 2
- Train operators: Regionalverkehr Bern-Solothurn
- Connections: Busbetrieb Solothurn und Umgebung bus lines

Construction
- Accessible: Yes

Other information
- Station code: 8508068 (BIBS)
- Fare zone: 201 (Libero)

History
- Opened: 10 April 1916

Services
Preceding station	Regionalverkehr Bern-Solothurn	Following station
Lohn-Lüterkofen towards Bern	RE5	Solothurn Terminus
Location

Biberist RBS railway station (German: Bahnhof Biberist RBS) is a railway station in the municipality of Biberist, in the Swiss canton of Solothurn. It is an intermediate stop on the 1,000 mm (3 ft 3 3/8 in) gauge Solothurn–Worblaufen line of Regionalverkehr Bern-Solothurn. Another station, Biberist Ost on the standard gauge Solothurn–Langnau line of BLS AG, is located approximately 1 kilometre (0.62 mi) to the east.

== Services ==
As of the December 2024 timetable change, the following services stop at Biberist RBS:

- RegioExpress: half-hourly service or service every fifteen minutes on weekdays between Bern and Solothurn.
