= Biberist Ost railway station =

Railway station in Biberist, Switzerland

Biberist Ost
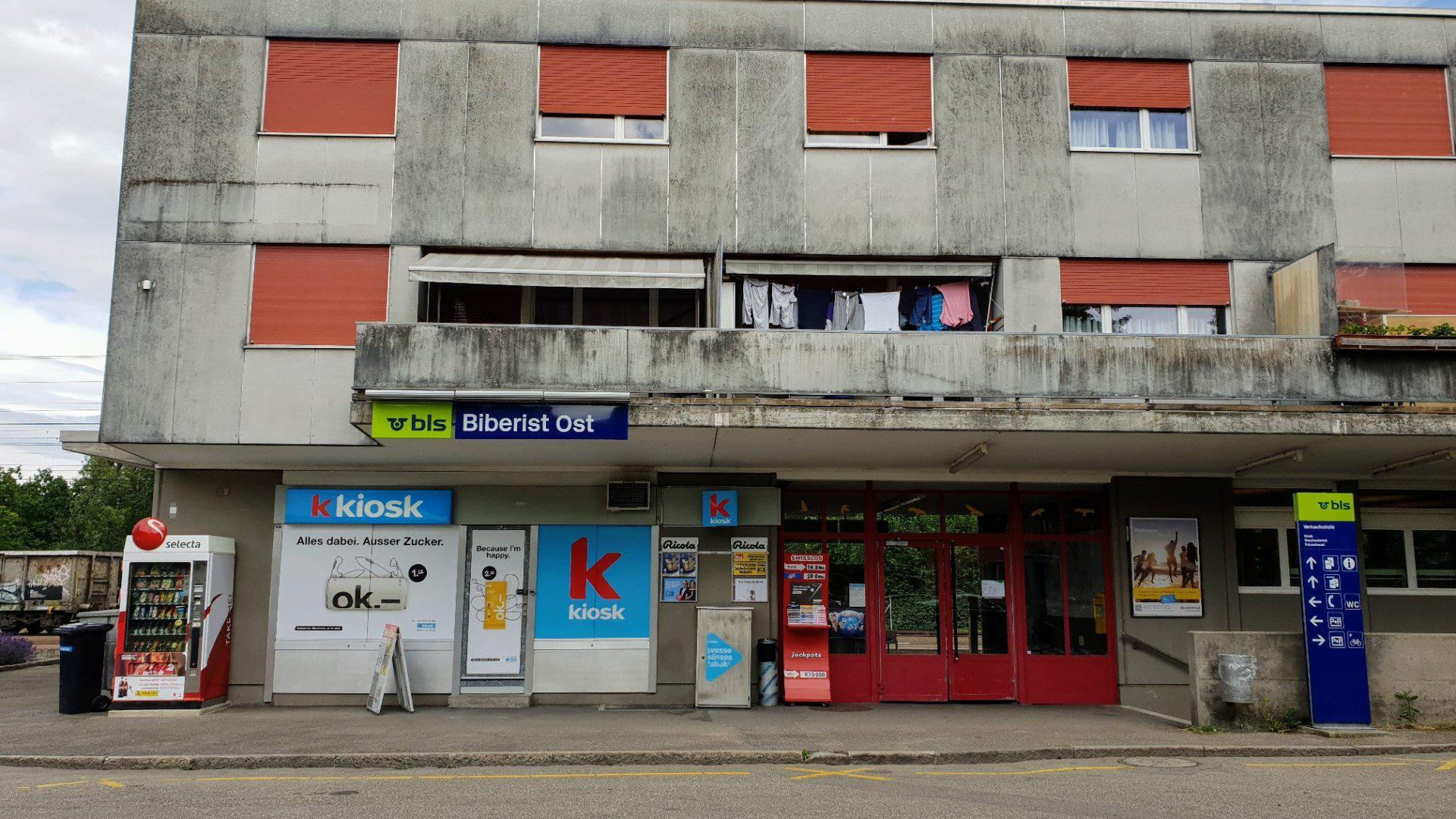
- The station building in 2018

General information
- Location: Biberist; Switzerland
- Coordinates: 47°10′52″N 7°33′58″E
- Elevation: 446 m (1,463 ft)
- Owner: BLS AG
- Line: Solothurn–Langnau line
- Distance: 4.6 km (2.9 mi) from Solothurn
- Platforms: 1 side platform
- Tracks: 2
- Train operators: BLS AG

Construction
- Parking: Yes (23 spaces)
- Accessible: Yes

Other information
- Station code: 8508089 (BIST)
- Fare zone: 201 (Libero)

History
- Rebuilt: 2019-2021
- Former names: Biberist RM, Biberist EBT

Passengers
- 2023: 320 per weekday (BLS)

Services
Preceding station	Bern S-Bahn	Following station
Gerlafingen towards Thun	S41	Solothurn Terminus
Gerlafingen towards Thun	S44	Solothurn Terminus
Location

Biberist Ost railway station (German: Bahnhof Biberist Ost) is a railway station in the municipality of Biberist, in the Swiss canton of Solothurn. It is an intermediate stop on the standard gauge Solothurn–Langnau line of BLS AG. The station is located on the east side of the Emme, opposite the Biberist city center. Another station, Biberist RBS on the 1,000 mm (3 ft 3 3/8 in) gauge Solothurn–Worblaufen line of Regionalverkehr Bern-Solothurn, is located approximately 1 kilometre (0.62 mi) to the west.

== Services ==
As of the December 2024 timetable change, the following services stop at Biberist Ost:

- Bern S-Bahn:
  - S41/S44: half-hourly service between Thun and Solothurn.
