= Jegenstorf railway station =

Railway station in Jegenstorf, Switzerland

Jegenstorf
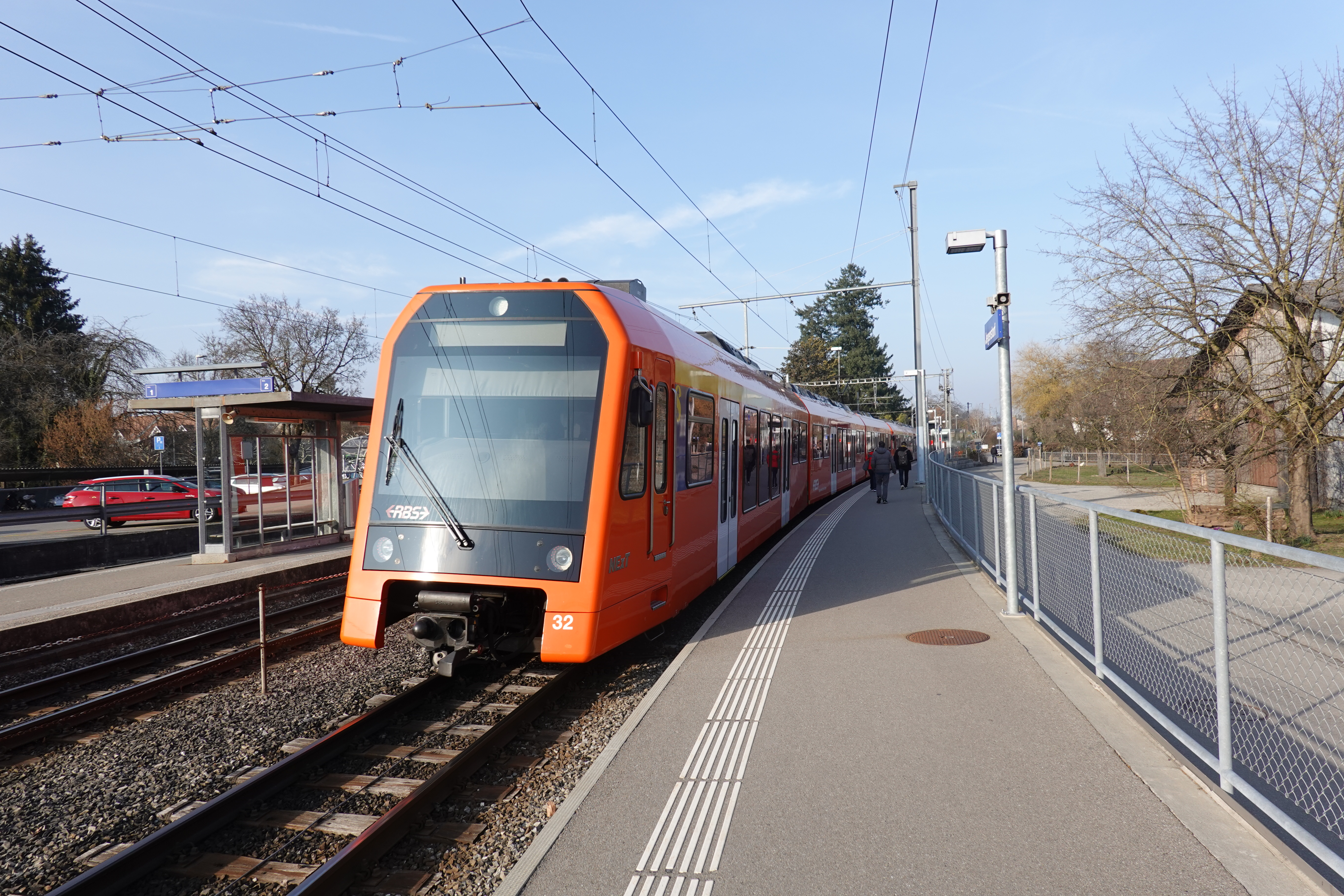
- A RBS train at the station in 2023

General information
- Location: Jegenstorf; Switzerland
- Coordinates: 47°02′53″N 7°30′29″E
- Elevation: 522 m (1,713 ft)
- Owner: Regionalverkehr Bern-Solothurn
- Line: Solothurn–Worblaufen line
- Distance: 20.0 km (12.4 mi) from Solothurn
- Platforms: 1 side platform; 1 island platform
- Tracks: 3
- Train operators: Regionalverkehr Bern-Solothurn
- Connections: RBS buses

Construction
- Accessible: Yes

Other information
- Station code: 8508059 (JEG)
- Fare zone: 124 (Libero)

Services
Preceding station	Regionalverkehr Bern-Solothurn	Following station
Bern Terminus	RE5	Fraubrunnen towards Solothurn
Bern Terminus	RE5	Bätterkinden towards Solothurn
Preceding station	Bern S-Bahn	Following station
Urtenen towards Bern	S8	Grafenried towards Bätterkinden
Urtenen towards Bern	S8	Terminus
Location

Jegenstorf railway station (German: Bahnhof Jegenstorf) is a railway station in the municipality of Jegenstorf, in the Swiss canton of Bern. It is an intermediate stop on the 1,000 mm (3 ft 3 3/8 in) gauge Solothurn–Worblaufen line of Regionalverkehr Bern-Solothurn.

== Services ==
The following services stop at Jegenstorf:

- RegioExpress: half-hourly service or service every 15 minutes on weekdays between Bern and Solothurn.
- Bern S-Bahn S8: service every fifteen minutes to Bern, half-hourly service to Bätterkinden.
