= Urtenen-Schönbühl =

- Municipality
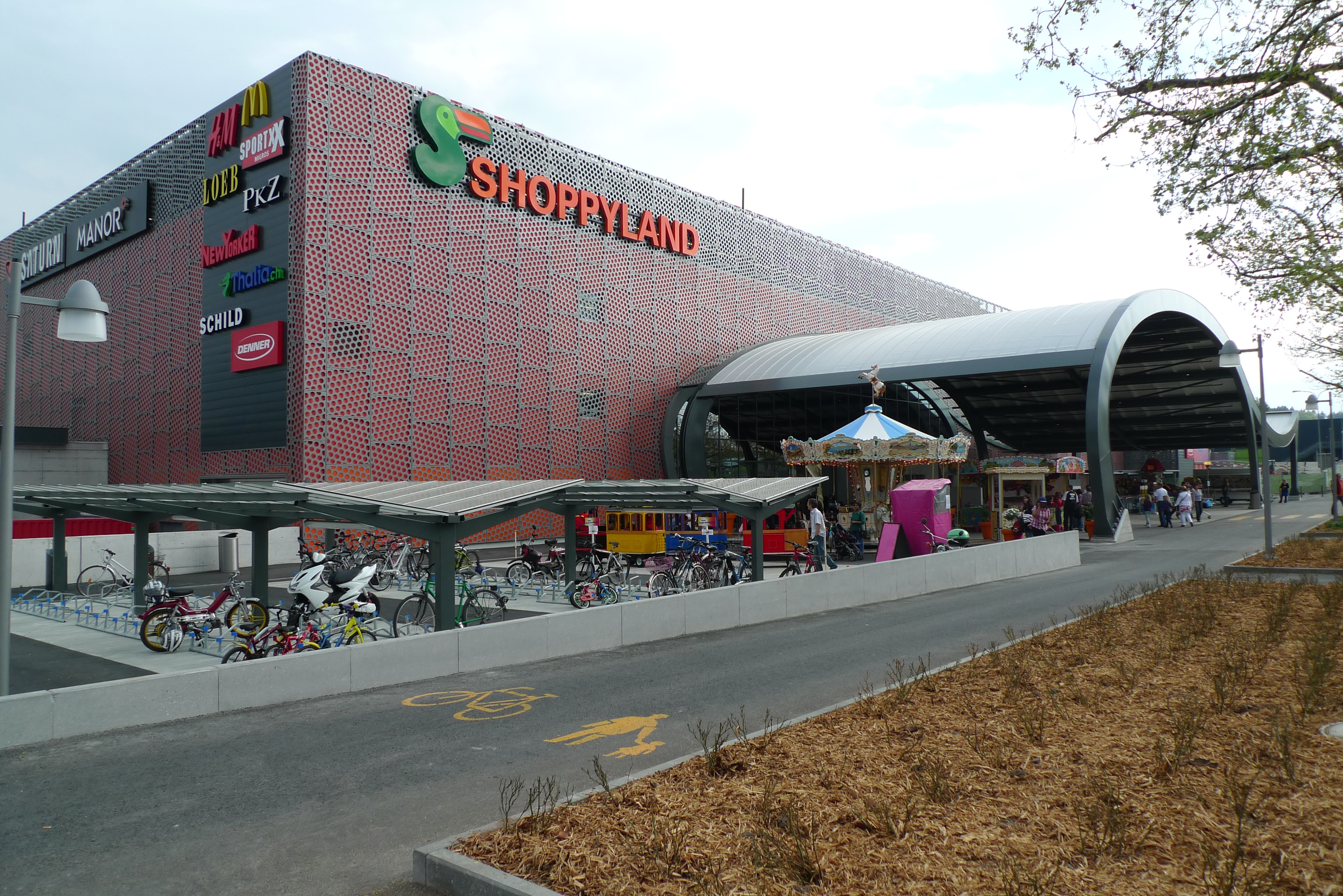

- Flag Coat of arms
- Location of Urtenen-Schönbühl
- Location within Switzerland Location within Canton of Bern
- Coordinates: 47°2′N 7°30′E
- Country: Switzerland
- Canton: Bern
- District: Bern-Mittelland

Government
  - Executive: Gemeinderat with 7 members
  - Mayor: Gemeindepräsident(in); Regula Iff (as of 2026)

Area
  - Total: 7.2 km^{2} (2.8 sq mi)
- Elevation: 525 m (1,722 ft)

Population (December 2020)
  - Total: 6,367
  - Density: 880/km^{2} (2,300/sq mi)
- Time zone: UTC+01:00 (CET)
  - Summer (DST): UTC+02:00 (CEST)
- Postal code: 3322
- SFOS number: 551
- ISO 3166 code: CH-BE
- Localities: Urtenen, Schönbühl
- Surrounded by: Ballmoos, Bolligen, Jegenstorf, Mattstetten, Moosseedorf, Wiggiswil
- Twin towns: Binn (Switzerland), Dacice (Czech Republic)
- Website: www.urtenen-schoenbuehl.ch

Urtenen-Schönbühl is a municipality in the Bern-Mittelland administrative district in the canton of Bern in Switzerland.

== History ==
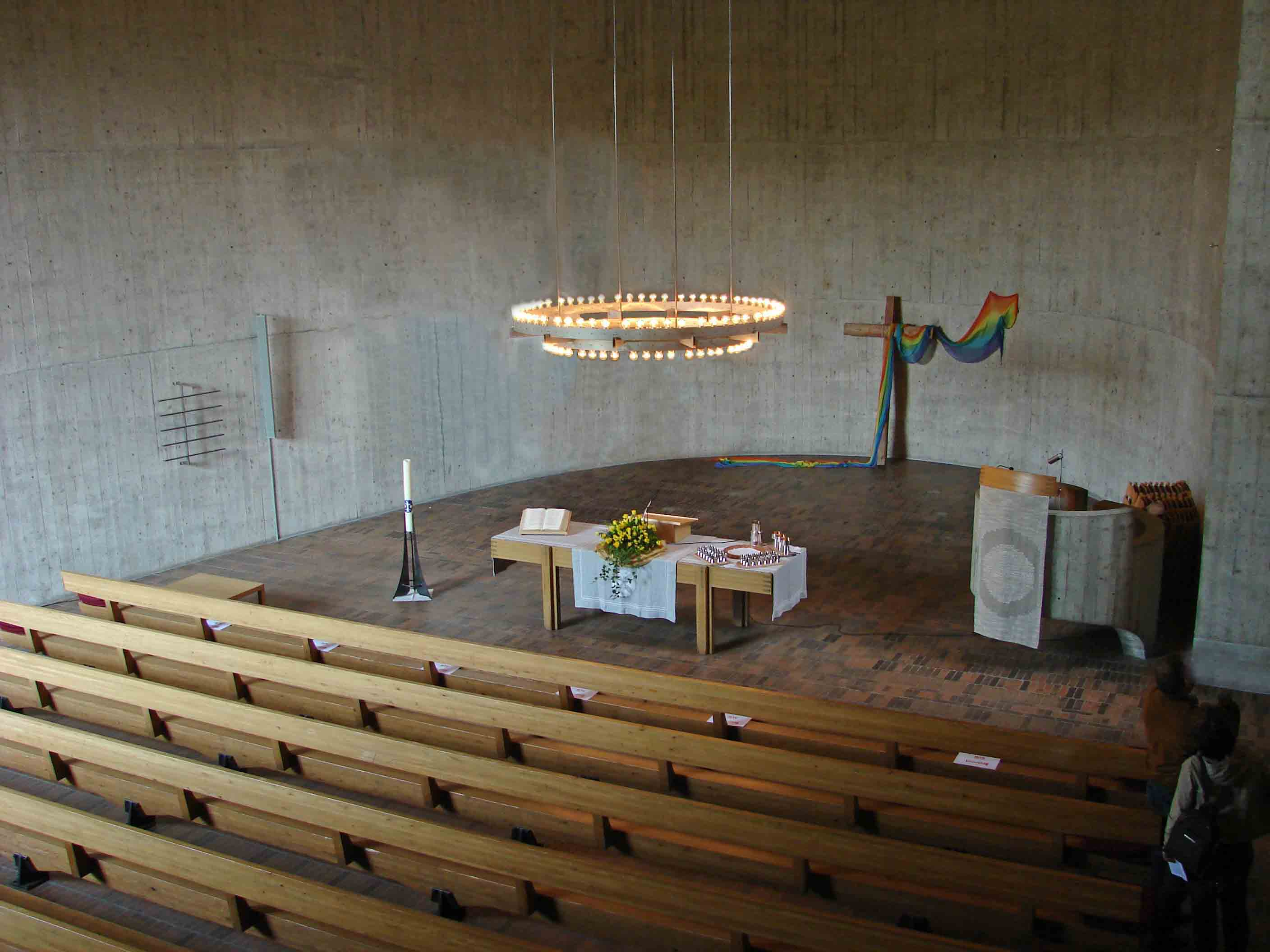
Interior of the parish church, built in 1965-68

The oldest trace of a settlement in the area are some neolithic artifacts which were discovered at Längenrüpp and Schönbühl. Prehistoric Hallstatt era grave mounds were found at Sand, Junkerenholz, Rödelberg and Bubenloowald along with a prehistoric cemetery at near the Oberdorfstrasse-Lindholenweg roads. Roman era ruins were discovered at Moossee.

The village of Urtenen is first mentioned in 1249, as Urtinun; it was owned by the Counts of Kyburg. Between 1371 and 1374 the village was acquired by Bernese patrician families. Over the following centuries, the von Diesbach, von Bonstetten, Willading and von Erlach families owned part or all of the village along with the neighboring village of Mattstetten. The local low court met at the tavern in Urtenen.

The municipal coat of arms is first recorded in 1780. Its blazon is Argent on a pile enbowed Sable a Latin Cross pattee of the first. Following the 1798 French invasion, the old power structure was wiped away. Five years later, after the Act of Mediation, Urtenen became part of the district of Fraubrunnen. The village was damaged when the Urtenen river flooded in 1780, 1855 and 1917. An amelioration project in 1944-46 lowered the river's level and built flood walls to protect the village. During the 19th century many farmers shifted from raising food crops to raising dairy cattle and in response the first village dairy opened in 1842. Historically the main road from Bern to the Aargau bypassed the village. That all changed in the 18th and 19th centuries. In 1845-48 the Bernstrasse was built through the village, connected Urtenen with Bern and the Aargau. Other roads followed, connecting the village with Solothurn and Biel. These were followed by a railroad to Olten in 1867 and another to Solothurn in 1916.

Urtenen quickly grew from a sleepy agricultural village to a major transport hub. Growth increased again in 1962 when the A1 and A6 motorway junction was completed near Schönbühl. Formerly part of the parish of Jegenstorf, Urtenen now became a parish in its own right, the parish church was built in 1965-68. Population doubled during the 1970s to 1980s period; in 1987 a new municipal center was built between the village of Urtenen and the neighboring former hamlet of Schönbühl. From that time, there were plans to rename the municipality, now no longer centered on the historical village of Urtenen, to Urtenen-Schönbühl. By 2000, there were over 3,000 jobs in the municipality. However, the old village has mostly retained its traditional appearance. Most of the new residents live in new developments outside the historic village. The municipality was officially renamed to Urtenen-Schönbühl in 2001.

== Geography ==
Aerial view by Walter Mittelholzer (1925)

Urtenen-Schönbühl has an area of 7.19 km^{2} (2.78 sq mi). Of this area, 3.18 km^{2} (1.23 mi^{2}) or 44.3% is used for agricultural purposes, while 2.17 km^{2} (0.84 mi^{2}) or 30.2% is forested. Of the rest of the land, 1.45 km^{2} (0.56 mi^{2}) or 20.2% is settled (buildings or roads), 0.22 km^{2} (0.085 mi^{2}) or 3.1% is either rivers or lakes and 0.14 km^{2} (35 acres) or 1.9% is unproductive land.

Of the built up area, industrial buildings made up 1.9% of the total area while housing and buildings made up 10.7% and transportation infrastructure made up 6.7%. Out of the forested land, all of the forested land area is covered with heavy forests. Of the agricultural land, 36.5% is used for growing crops and 7.0% is pastures. Of the water in the municipality, 2.6% is in lakes and 0.4% is in rivers and streams.

The municipality is located in the Urtenen valley. It consists of the village of Urtenen, the neighborhood of Schönbühl and part of Krauchthalerbergen.

On 31 December 2009 Amtsbezirk Fraubrunnen, the municipality's former district, was dissolved. On the following day, 1 January 2010, it joined the newly created Verwaltungskreis Bern-Mittelland.

== Demographics ==
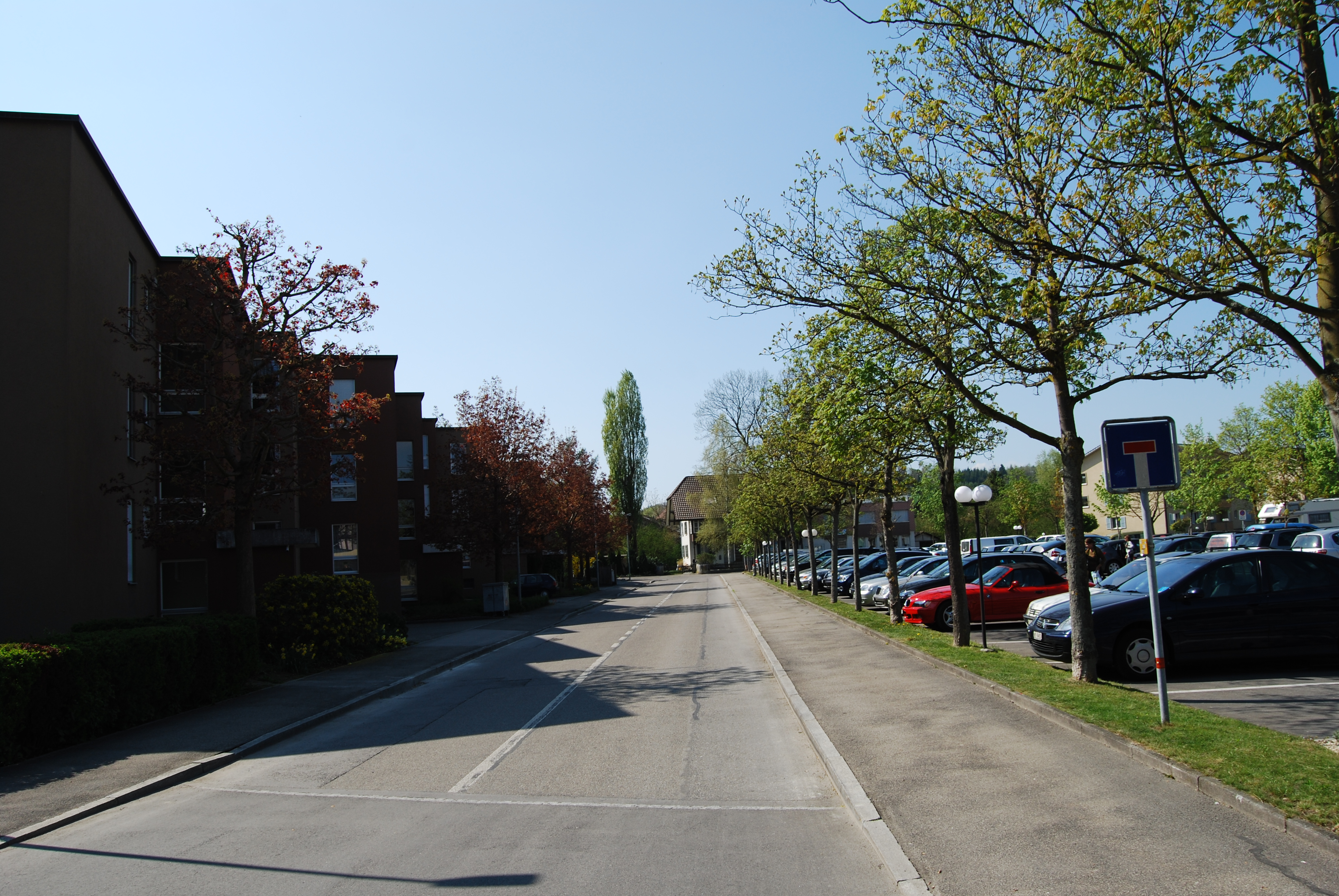
Residential street in Urtenen-Schönbühl

Urtenen-Schönbühl has a population (as of December 2020) of 6,367. As of 2010, 16.3% of the population are resident foreign nationals. Over the last 10 years (2000-2010) the population has changed at a rate of 9.3%. Migration accounted for 4.3%, while births and deaths accounted for 5%.

Most of the population (as of 2000) speaks German (4,628 or 87.4%) as their first language, Serbo-Croatian is the second most common (139 or 2.6%) and Italian is the third (87 or 1.6%). There are 86 people who speak French and 2 people who speak Romansh.

As of 2008, the population was 48.7% male and 51.3% female. The population was made up of 2,267 Swiss men (40.2% of the population) and 485 (8.6%) non-Swiss men. There were 2,457 Swiss women (43.5%) and 437 (7.7%) non-Swiss women. Of the population in the municipality, 979 or about 18.5% were born in Urtenen-Schönbühl and lived there in 2000. There were 2,359 or 44.6% who were born in the same canton, while 790 or 14.9% were born somewhere else in Switzerland, and 903 or 17.1% were born outside of Switzerland.

As of 2010, children and teenagers (0–19 years old) make up 19.9% of the population, while adults (20–64 years old) make up 65.8% and seniors (over 64 years old) make up 14.3%.

As of 2000, there were 2,184 people who were single and never married in the municipality. There were 2,574 married individuals, 223 widows or widowers and 314 individuals who are divorced.

As of 2000, there were 716 households that consist of only one person and 124 households with five or more people. In 2000, a total of 2,180 apartments (90.3% of the total) were permanently occupied, while 149 apartments (6.2%) were seasonally occupied and 86 apartments (3.6%) were empty. As of 2010, the construction rate of new housing units was 2.8 new units per 1000 residents. The vacancy rate for the municipality, in 2011, was 3.41%.

The historical population is given in the following chart:

== Politics ==
In the 2011 federal election the most popular party was the Swiss People's Party (SVP) which received 28.7% of the vote. The next three most popular parties were the Social Democratic Party (SP) (19%), the Conservative Democratic Party (BDP) (18.3%) and the FDP.The Liberals (7.8%). In the federal election, a total of 1,719 votes were cast, and the voter turnout was 43.0%.

== Economy ==
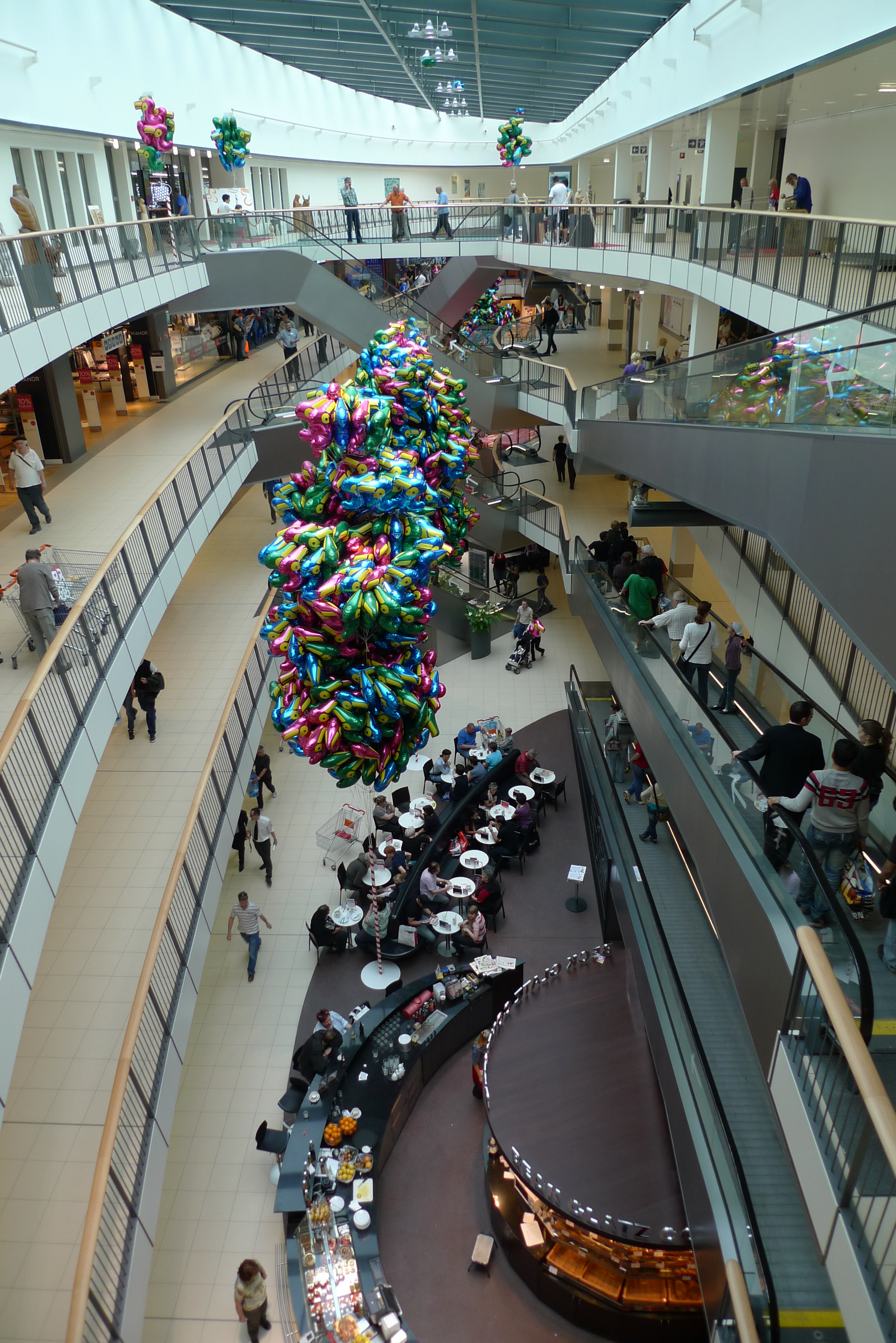
Interior of the Shoppyland shopping complex in Schönbühl

As of 2011, Urtenen-Schönbühl had an unemployment rate of 2.74%. As of 2008, there were a total of 2,176 people employed in the municipality. Of these, there were 51 people employed in the primary economic sector and about 17 businesses involved in this sector. 607 people were employed in the secondary sector and there were 47 businesses in this sector. 1,518 people were employed in the tertiary sector, with 177 businesses in this sector. There were 3,147 residents of the municipality who were employed in some capacity, of which females made up 46.9% of the workforce.

In 2008 there were a total of 1,775 full-time equivalent jobs. The number of jobs in the primary sector was 28, all of which were in agriculture. The number of jobs in the secondary sector was 546 of which 379 or (69.4%) were in manufacturing and 168 (30.8%) were in construction. The number of jobs in the tertiary sector was 1,201. In the tertiary sector; 420 or 35.0% were in wholesale or retail sales or the repair of motor vehicles, 30 or 2.5% were in the movement and storage of goods, 46 or 3.8% were in a hotel or restaurant, 190 or 15.8% were in the information industry, 73 or 6.1% were the insurance or financial industry, 77 or 6.4% were technical professionals or scientists, 49 or 4.1% were in education and 132 or 11.0% were in health care.

In 2000, there were 2,007 workers who commuted into the municipality and 2,432 workers who commuted away. The municipality is a net exporter of workers, with about 1.2 workers leaving the municipality for every one entering. Of the working population, 31.4% used public transportation to get to work, and 44.3% used a private car.

== Religion ==
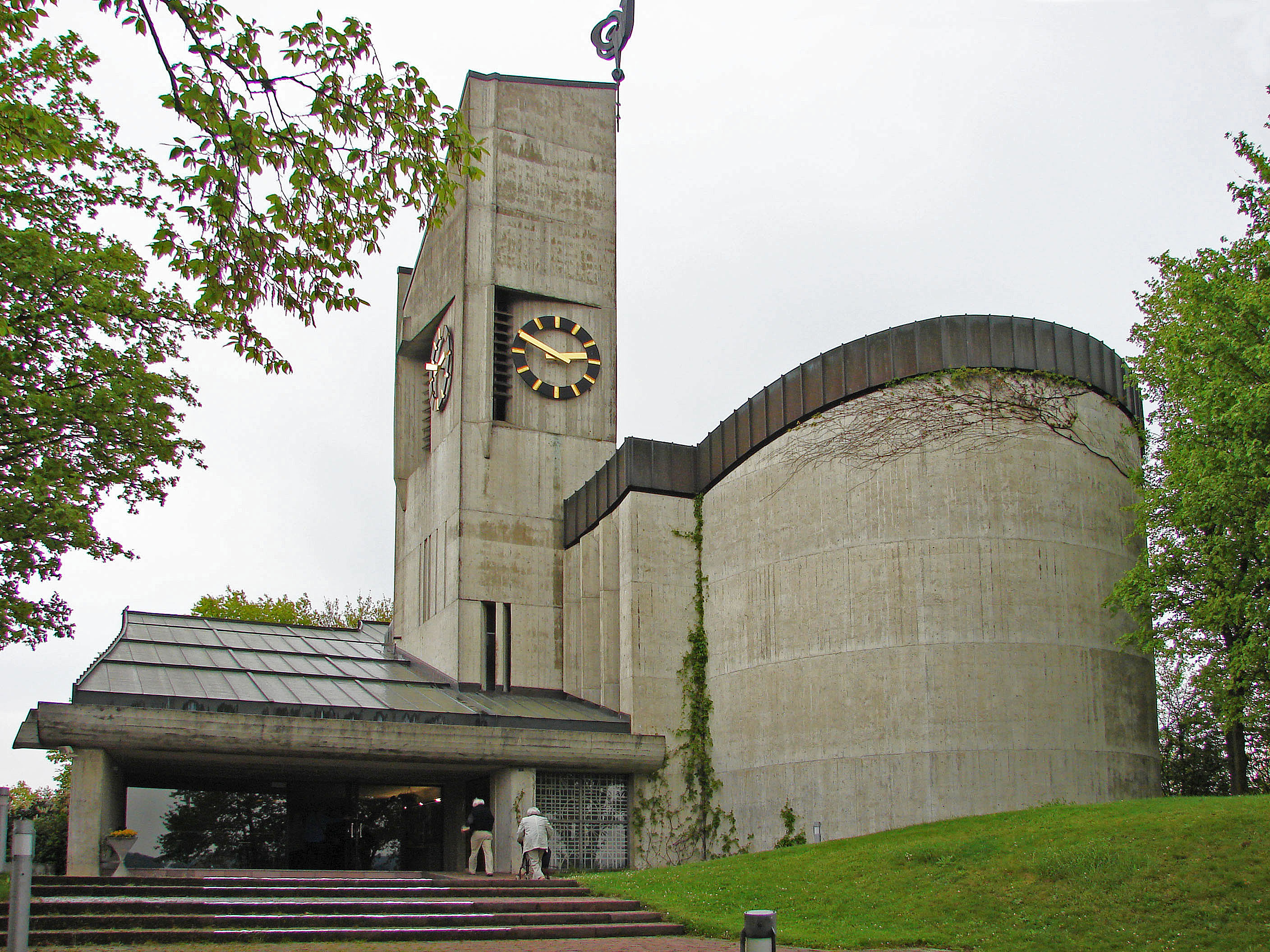
Swiss Reformed church of Urtenen

From the 2000 census, 845 or 16.0% were Roman Catholic, while 3,165 or 59.8% belonged to the Swiss Reformed Church. Of the rest of the population, there were 125 members of an Orthodox church (or about 2.36% of the population), there were 10 individuals (or about 0.19% of the population) who belonged to the Christian Catholic Church, and there were 330 individuals (or about 6.23% of the population) who belonged to another Christian church. There was 1 individual who was Jewish, and 225 (or about 4.25% of the population) who were Islamic. There were 29 individuals who were Buddhist, 17 individuals who were Hindu and 3 individuals who belonged to another church. 413 (or about 7.80% of the population) belonged to no church, are agnostic or atheist, and 295 individuals (or about 5.57% of the population) did not answer the question.

== Education ==
In Urtenen-Schönbühl about 2,254 or (42.6%) of the population have completed non-mandatory upper secondary education, and 619 or (11.7%) have completed additional higher education (either university or a Fachhochschule). Of the 619 who completed tertiary schooling, 67.9% were Swiss men, 22.9% were Swiss women, 5.8% were non-Swiss men and 3.4% were non-Swiss women.

The Canton of Bern school system provides one year of non-obligatory Kindergarten, followed by six years of Primary school. This is followed by three years of obligatory lower Secondary school where the students are separated according to ability and aptitude. Following the lower Secondary students may attend additional schooling or they may enter an apprenticeship.

During the 2010-11 school year, there were a total of 559 students attending classes in Urtenen-Schönbühl. There were 6 kindergarten classes with a total of 122 students in the municipality. Of the kindergarten students, 27.9% were permanent or temporary residents of Switzerland (not citizens) and 41.0% have a different mother language than the classroom language. The municipality had 15 primary classes and 277 students. Of the primary students, 24.2% were permanent or temporary residents of Switzerland (not citizens) and 37.5% have a different mother language than the classroom language. During the same year, there were 11 lower secondary classes with a total of 160 students. There were 20.6% who were permanent or temporary residents of Switzerland (not citizens) and 40.0% have a different mother language than the classroom language.

As of 2000, there were 34 students in Urtenen-Schönbühl who came from another municipality, while 140 residents attended schools outside the municipality.

== Transportation ==
The municipality has three railway stations: Schönbühl SBB, Schönbühl RBS, and Urtenen. The former is located on the standard gauge Olten–Bern line while the latter two are on the narrow-gauge Solothurn–Worblaufen line.
