= Stadler NExT =

Commuter train by Stadler Rail (2009)

RBS RABe 4/12
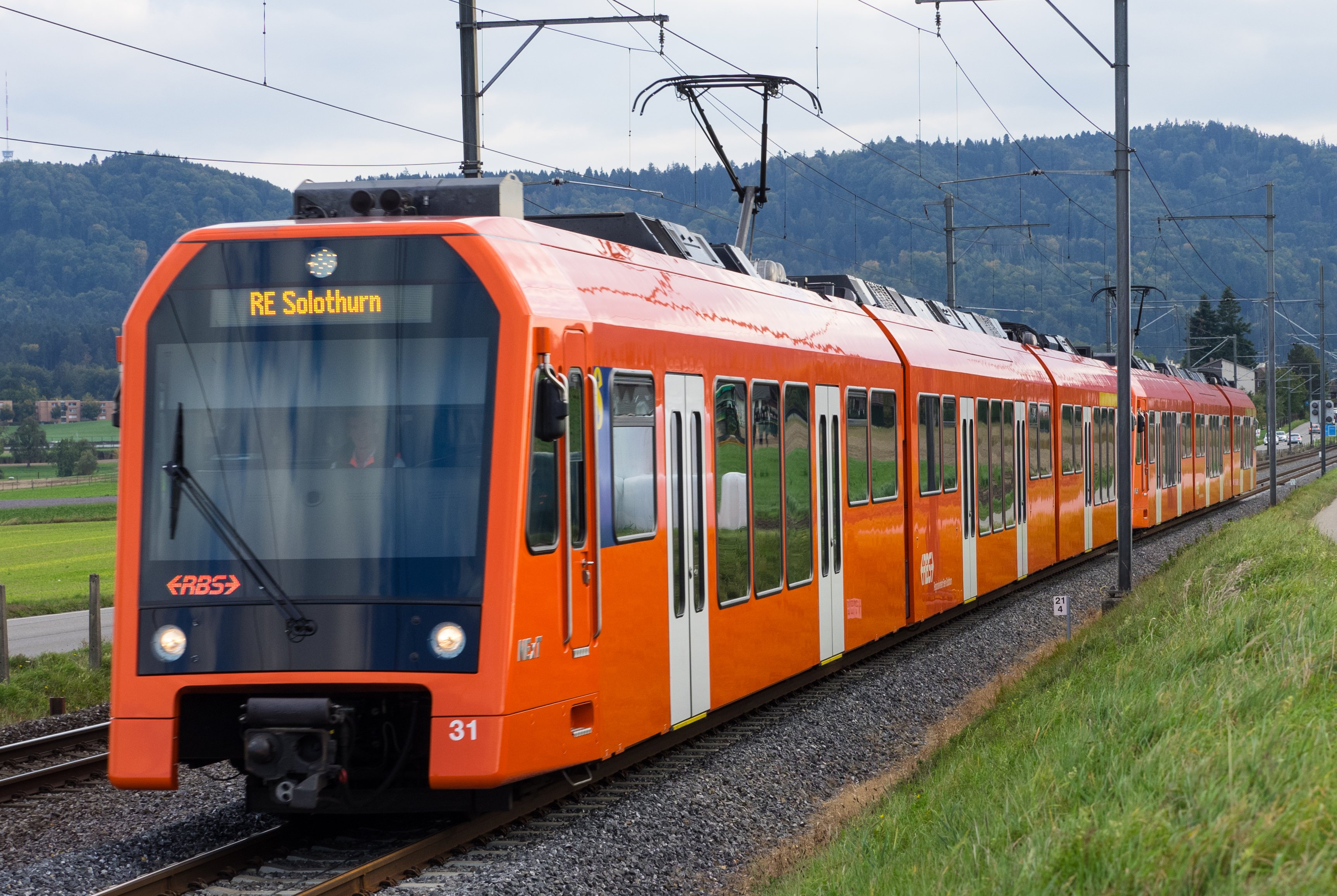
- Stadler NExT at Jegenstorf
- In service: 2009–present
- Manufacturer: Stadler Rail
- Built at: Altenrhein
- Constructed: 2009–2013
- Number built: 14 trains
- Number in service: 14 trains
- Formation: 3 carriages per train
- Fleet numbers: RABe 4/12 21-34
- Capacity: 443 passengers (154 seated, 289 standing)
- Operators: Regionalverkehr Bern-Solothurn
- Depots: Worblaufen, Solothurn
- Lines served: Solothurn–Worblaufen-Bern railway

Specifications
- Car body construction: Aluminium
- Car length: 60 m (196 ft 10 in) (3-carriage train)
- Width: 2.650 m (8 ft 8.3 in)
- Height: 3.945 m (12 ft 11.3 in)
- Floor height: 400 mm (16 in)
- Doors: 6 per side
- Articulated sections: 3
- Maximum speed: 120 kilometres per hour (75 mph)
- Weight: 77 tonnes (170,000 lb) (3-carriage train)
- Power output: 1‘400 kW
- Acceleration: 1.1 m/s^{2}
- Electric system(s): 1,250 VDC
- Safety system(s): ETCS, Integra-Signum
- Track gauge: 1,000 mm (3 ft 3 3/8 in) metre gauge

The Niederflur-Express-Triebzug (NExT, English: low-floor express trainset) is an electric multiple unit light commuter train developed by Stadler Rail for the Swiss Regionalverkehr Bern-Solothurn (RBS) railway operator. With a top speed of 120 km/h (75 mph), it is the fastest metre gauge train in Switzerland.

Six three-carriage trains were delivered in 2009 at a cost of 53.4 million CHF and are used for express service between Bern and Solothurn. In 2013, 8 additional trains were delivered.

The Neue Zürcher Zeitung commented favourably on the train's angular design and use of interior space. It commended RBS for setting "new standards of design and comfort" in Swiss commuter transport with the NExT.
