= Bätterkinden railway station =

Railway station in Bätterkinden, Switzerland

Bätterkinden
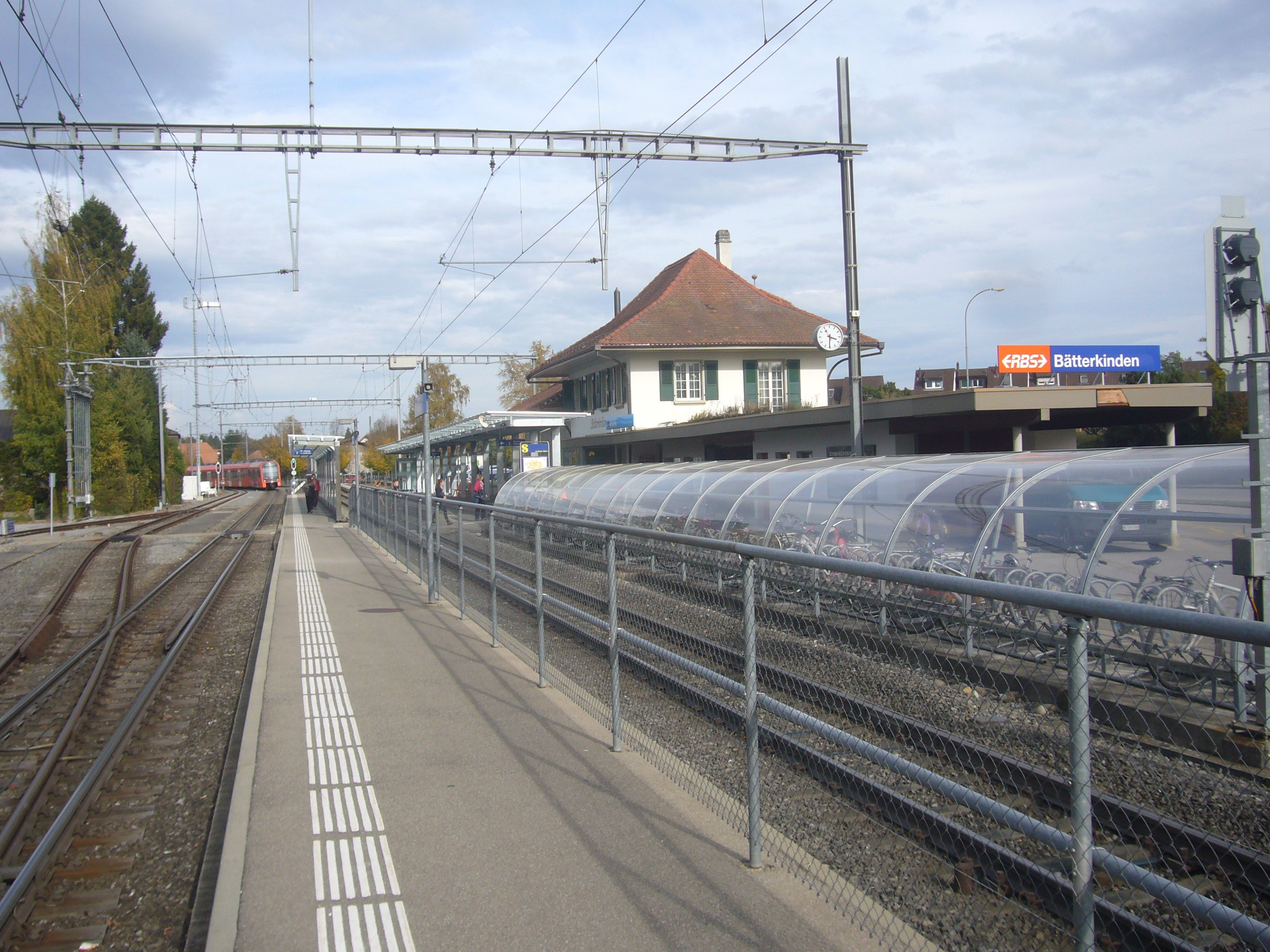
- The station platforms in 2017

General information
- Location: Bätterkinden; Switzerland
- Coordinates: 47°07′48″N 7°32′02″E
- Elevation: 472 m (1,549 ft)
- Owner: Regionalverkehr Bern-Solothurn
- Line: Solothurn–Worblaufen line
- Distance: 10.0 km (6.2 mi) from Solothurn
- Platforms: 2 side platforms
- Tracks: 2
- Train operators: Regionalverkehr Bern-Solothurn
- Connections: RBS buses; PostAuto AG bus line

Construction
- Accessible: Yes

Other information
- Station code: 8508064 (BKI)
- Fare zone: 218 (Libero)

History
- Opened: 10 April 1916

Services
Preceding station	Regionalverkehr Bern-Solothurn	Following station
Fraubrunnen towards Bern	RE5	Lohn-Lüterkofen towards Solothurn
Jegenstorf towards Bern	RE5 Weekdays only	Lohn-Lüterkofen towards Solothurn
Preceding station	Bern S-Bahn	Following station
Schalunen towards Bern	S8	Terminus
Location

Bätterkinden railway station (German: Bahnhof Bätterkinden) is a railway station in the municipality of Bätterkinden, in the Swiss canton of Bern. It is an intermediate stop on the 1,000 mm (3 ft 3 3/8 in) gauge Solothurn–Worblaufen line of Regionalverkehr Bern-Solothurn.

== Services ==
As of the December 2024 timetable change, the following services stop at Bätterkinden:

- RegioExpress: half-hourly service or service every fifteen minutes on weekdays between Bern and Solothurn.
- Bern S-Bahn S8: half-hourly service to Bern.
