= Fraubrunnen =

- Municipality
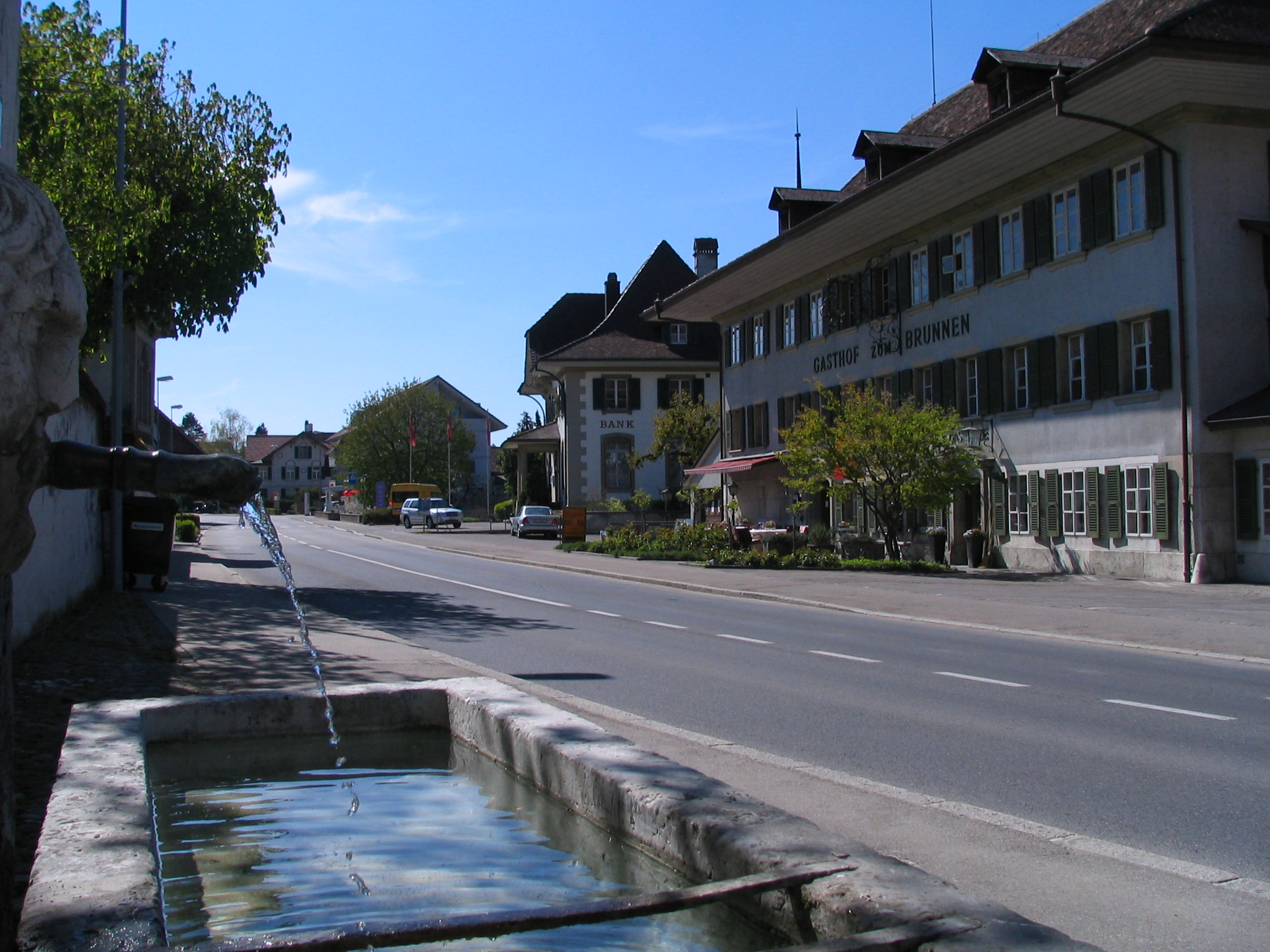

- Flag Coat of arms
- Location of Fraubrunnen
- Location within Switzerland Location within Canton of Bern
- Coordinates: 47°5′N 7°32′E
- Country: Switzerland
- Canton: Bern
- District: Bern-Mittelland

Government
  - Executive: Gemeinderat with 7 members
  - Mayor: Gemeindepräsident; Simon Keller (as of 2026)

Area
  - Total: 31.91 km^{2} (12.32 sq mi)
- Elevation: 495 m (1,624 ft)

Population (December 2020)
  - Total: 5,203
  - Density: 163.1/km^{2} (422.3/sq mi)
- Time zone: UTC+01:00 (CET)
  - Summer (DST): UTC+02:00 (CEST)
- Postal code: 3312
- SFOS number: 538
- ISO 3166 code: CH-BE
- Surrounded by: Aefligen, Bätterkinden, Büren zum Hof, Etzelkofen, Grafenried, Kernenried, Limpach, Lyssach, Rüdtligen-Alchenflüh, Schalunen, Zauggenried
- Website: www.fraubrunnen.ch

Fraubrunnen is a municipality in the Bern-Mittelland administrative district in the canton of Bern in Switzerland. On 1 January 2014 the former municipalities of Büren zum Hof, Etzelkofen, Grafenried, Limpach, Mülchi, Schalunen and Zauggenried merged into the municipality of Fraubrunnen.

== History ==
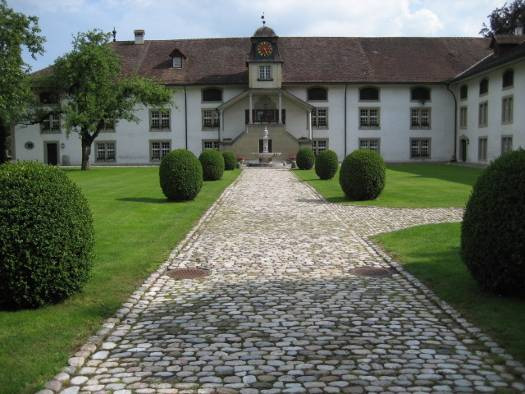
The former Abbey

Fraubrunnen is first mentioned in 1267 as Frouwenbrunnen. There are Hallstatt era tumuli (burial mounds) in the Rüdtligenwald and Binelwald near Fraubrunnen. In the middle of the 13th Century, Fraubrunnen Abbey was founded by Cistercian nuns. For a time the Abbey was a powerful landholder in the area that is now the District of Fraubrunnen. However, in 1528 the Abbey was secularization during the Protestant Reformation.

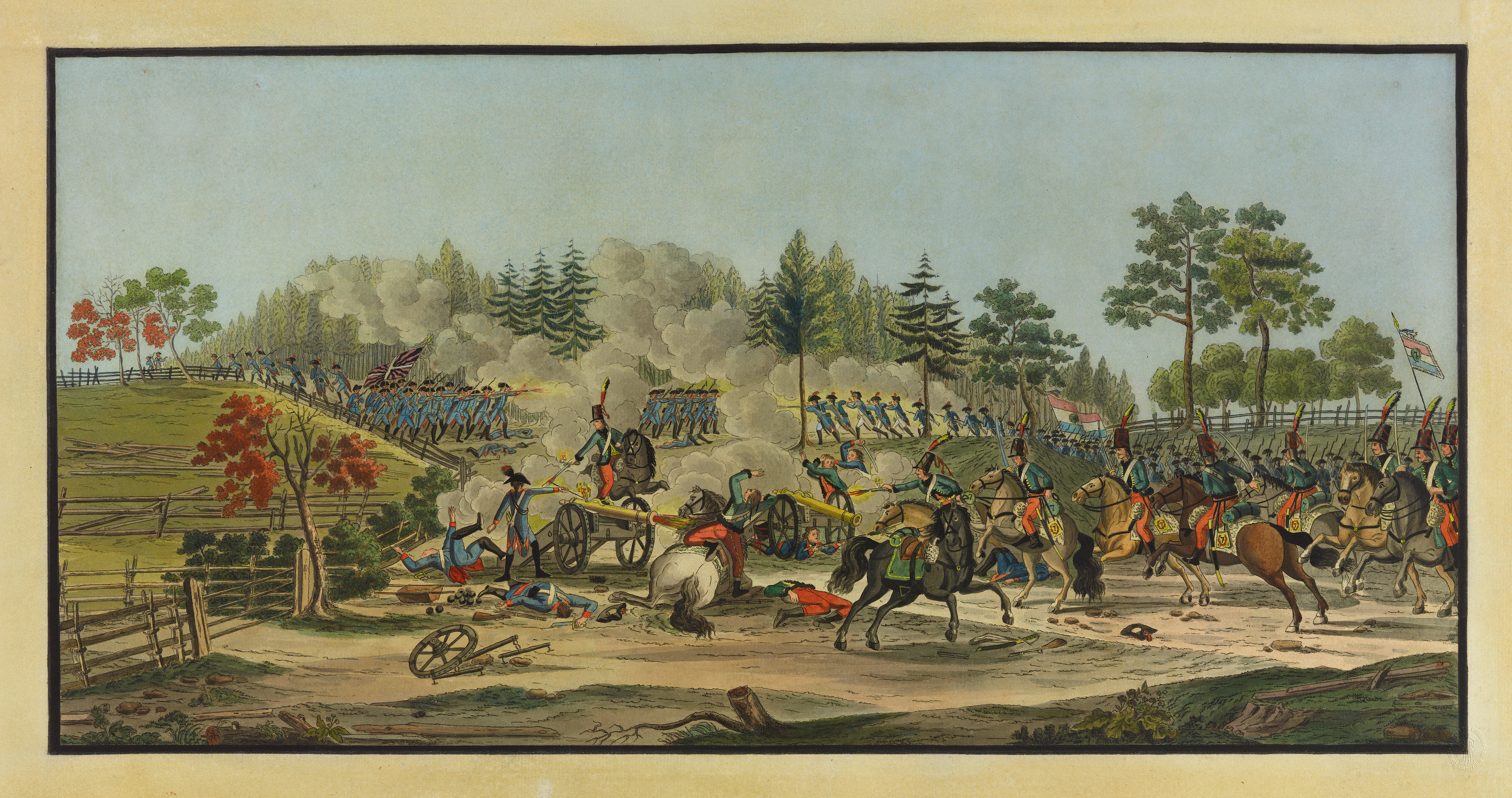
Battle of 1798

In 1798, Napoleon's troops invaded Switzerland. In response, Bern sent an army northward towards the French. On 5 March 1798 Bernese troops encountered the French near Fraubrunnen. The battle between 35,000 French soldier and 20,000 Bernese soldiers ended in a decisive victory for the French. This defeat, lead to the capitulation of the Bernese Ancien Régime.

== Geography ==
Aerial view by Walter Mittelholzer (1925)

Fraubrunnen has an area of 31.91 km^{2} (12.32 sq mi). Before the merger, 4.06 km^{2} (1.57 mi^{2}) or 52.8% was used for agricultural purposes, while 2.97 km^{2} (1.15 mi^{2}) or 38.6% was forested. Of the rest of the land, 0.59 km^{2} (0.23 mi^{2}) or 7.7% was settled (buildings or roads), 0.07 km^{2} (17 acres) or 0.9% was either rivers or lakes.

Of the built up area, housing and buildings made up 3.6% and transportation infrastructure made up 3.3%. Out of the forested land, all of the forested land area is covered with heavy forests. Of the agricultural land, 46.2% is used for growing crops and 6.2% is pastures. All the water in the municipality is flowing water.

The municipality is located in the Urtenen river valley. It consists of the village of Fraubrunnen and the hamlets of Binel, Bischof, Unterberg and Tubenmoos.

On 31 December 2009 Amtsbezirk Fraubrunnen, the municipality's former district, was dissolved. On the following day, 1 January 2010, it joined the newly created Verwaltungskreis Bern-Mittelland.

== Coat of arms ==
The blazon of the municipal coat of arms is Gules a Bendlet Or between two Lions passant of the same.

== Demographics ==
Fraubrunnen has a population (as of December 2020) of 5,203. As of 2010, 5.9% of the population are resident foreign nationals. Over the last 10 years (2000-2010) the population has changed at a rate of 11.9%. Migration accounted for 5.8%, while births and deaths accounted for 5.2%.

Most of the population (as of 2000) speaks German (1,534 or 95.5%) as their first language, French is the second most common (13 or 0.8%) and Italian is the third (10 or 0.6%).

As of 2008, the population was 49.2% male and 50.8% female. The population was made up of 823 Swiss men (46.4% of the population) and 49 (2.8%) non-Swiss men. There were 846 Swiss women (47.7%) and 56 (3.2%) non-Swiss women. Of the population in the municipality, 315 or about 19.6% were born in Fraubrunnen and lived there in 2000. There were 772 or 48.0% who were born in the same canton, while 356 or 22.2% were born somewhere else in Switzerland, and 114 or 7.1% were born outside of Switzerland.

As of 2010, children and teenagers (0–19 years old) make up 23.4% of the population, while adults (20–64 years old) make up 60.9% and seniors (over 64 years old) make up 15.6%.

As of 2000, there were 660 people who were single and never married in the municipality. There were 841 married individuals, 51 widows or widowers and 55 individuals who are divorced.

As of 2000, there were 138 households that consist of only one person and 47 households with five or more people. In 2000, a total of 613 apartments (92.9% of the total) were permanently occupied, while 24 apartments (3.6%) were seasonally occupied and 23 apartments (3.5%) were empty. As of 2010, the construction rate of new housing units was 3.9 new units per 1000 residents. The vacancy rate for the municipality, in 2011, was 0.38%.

== Historic population ==
The historical population is given in the following chart:

== Heritage sites of national significance ==
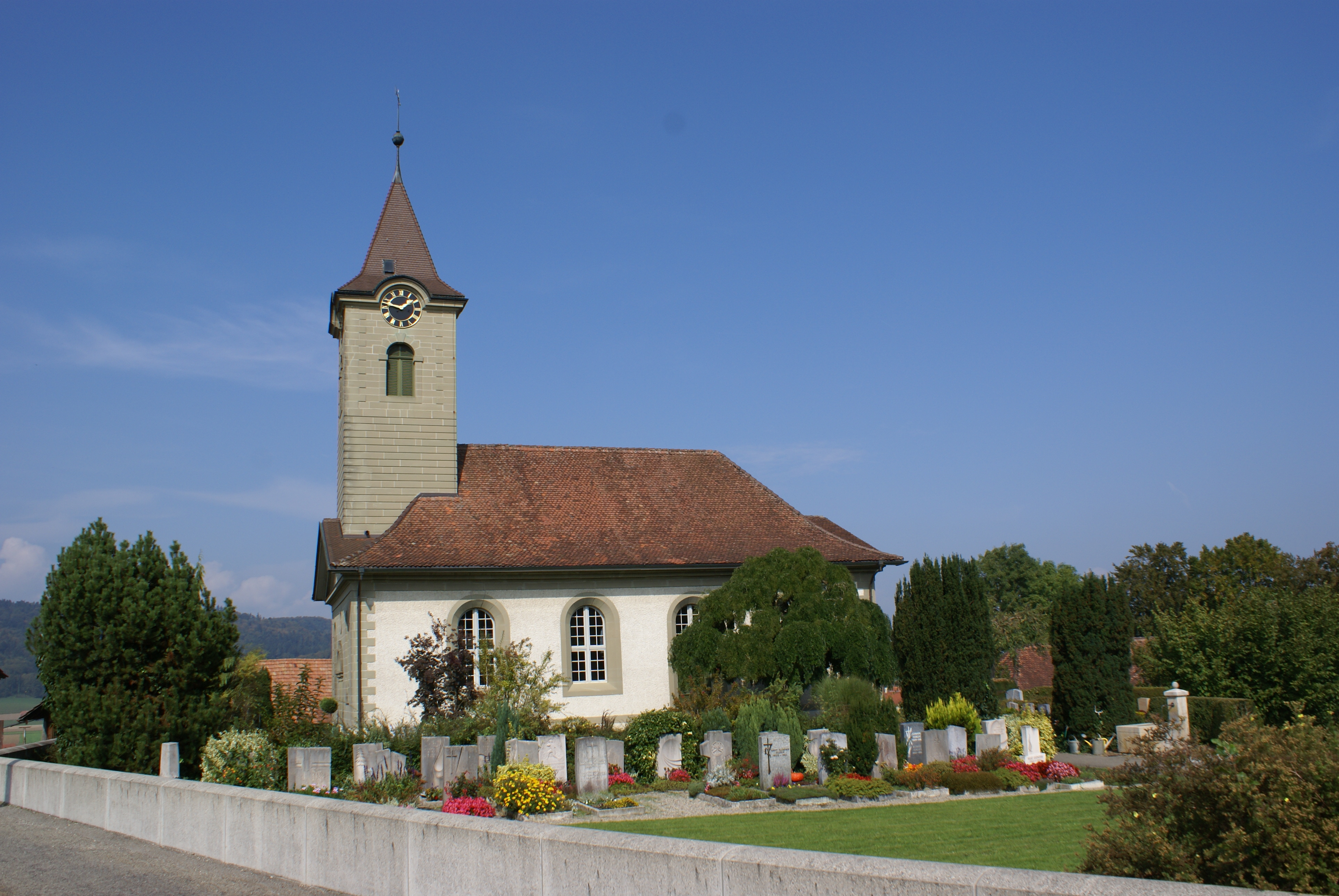
Swiss Reformed church of Limpach

The Swiss Reformed church in Limpach is listed as a Swiss heritage site of national significance. The entire villages of Büren zum Hof, Limpach and Mülchi are designated as part of the Inventory of Swiss Heritage Sites.

== Politics ==
In the 2011 federal election the most popular party was the Conservative Democratic Party (BDP) which received 26.4% of the vote. The next three most popular parties were the Swiss People's Party (SVP) (22.7%), the Social Democratic Party (SP) (16.7%) and the Green Party (9.3%). In the federal election, a total of 807 votes were cast, and the voter turnout was 60.3%.

== Economy ==
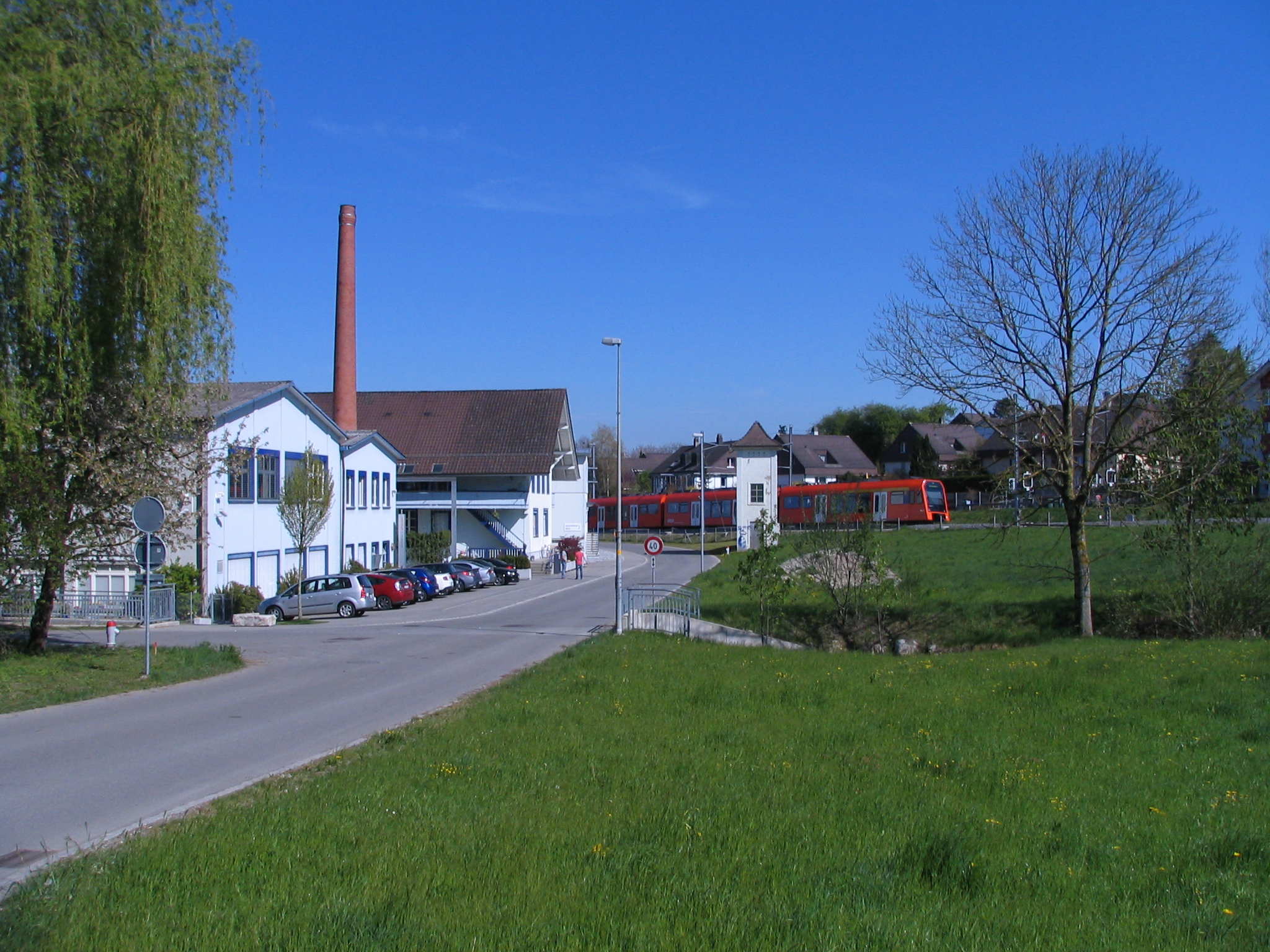
Factory and train (Kirchgasse)

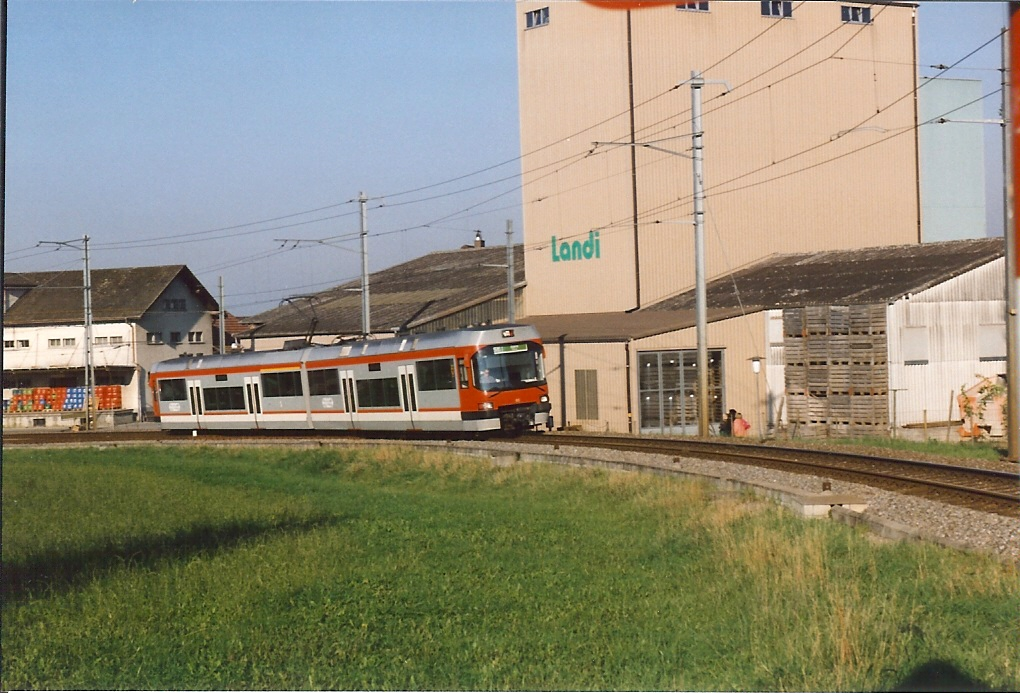
An RBS (Regionalverkehr Bern-Solothurn) train at Fraubrunnen station

As of 2011, Fraubrunnen had an unemployment rate of 1.54%. As of 2008, there were a total of 481 people employed in the municipality. Of these, there were 23 people employed in the primary economic sector and about 9 businesses involved in this sector. 206 people were employed in the secondary sector and there were 15 businesses in this sector. 252 people were employed in the tertiary sector, with 50 businesses in this sector. There were 880 residents of the municipality who were employed in some capacity, of which females made up 44.5% of the workforce.

In 2008 there were a total of 403 full-time equivalent jobs. The number of jobs in the primary sector was 18, all of which were in agriculture. The number of jobs in the secondary sector was 194 of which 185 or (95.4%) were in manufacturing and 9 (4.6%) were in construction. The number of jobs in the tertiary sector was 191. In the tertiary sector; 30 or 15.7% were in wholesale or retail sales or the repair of motor vehicles, 15 or 7.9% were in the movement and storage of goods, 12 or 6.3% were in a hotel or restaurant, 12 or 6.3% were in the information industry, 5 or 2.6% were the insurance or financial industry, 28 or 14.7% were technical professionals or scientists, 30 or 15.7% were in education and 7 or 3.7% were in health care.

In 2000, there were 334 workers who commuted into the municipality and 663 workers who commuted away. The municipality is a net exporter of workers, with about 2.0 workers leaving the municipality for every one entering. Of the working population, 35.3% used public transportation to get to work, and 40.7% used a private car.

== Religion ==
From the 2000 census, 204 or 12.7% were Roman Catholic, while 1,185 or 73.7% belonged to the Swiss Reformed Church. Of the rest of the population, there were 3 members of an Orthodox church (or about 0.19% of the population), and there were 104 individuals (or about 6.47% of the population) who belonged to another Christian church. There were 36 (or about 2.24% of the population) who were Islamic. There was 1 person who was Buddhist, 9 individuals who were Hindu and 2 individuals who belonged to another church. 70 (or about 4.36% of the population) belonged to no church, are agnostic or atheist, and 44 individuals (or about 2.74% of the population) did not answer the question.

== Education ==
In Fraubrunnen about 659 or (41.0%) of the population have completed non-mandatory upper secondary education, and 275 or (17.1%) have completed additional higher education (either university or a Fachhochschule). Of the 275 who completed tertiary schooling, 74.9% were Swiss men, 20.7% were Swiss women, 3.3% were non-Swiss men.

The Canton of Bern school system provides one year of non-obligatory Kindergarten, followed by six years of Primary school. This is followed by three years of obligatory lower Secondary school where the students are separated according to ability and aptitude. Following the lower Secondary students may attend additional schooling or they may enter an apprenticeship.

During the 2010-11 school year, there were a total of 332 students attending classes in Fraubrunnen. There were 3 kindergarten classes with a total of 49 students in the municipality. Of the kindergarten students, 8.2% were permanent or temporary residents of Switzerland (not citizens) and 16.3% have a different mother language than the classroom language. The municipality had 7 primary classes and 124 students. Of the primary students, 7.3% were permanent or temporary residents of Switzerland (not citizens) and 8.9% have a different mother language than the classroom language. During the same year, there were 9 lower secondary classes with a total of 159 students. There were 3.8% who were permanent or temporary residents of Switzerland (not citizens) and 4.4% have a different mother language than the classroom language.

As of 2000, there were 125 students in Fraubrunnen who came from another municipality, while 56 residents attended schools outside the municipality.

== Notable residents ==
- Adolf Ogi (born 18 July 1944), a former prime minister of Switzerland (1993 and 2000) currently lives in Fraubrunnen.

== Literature ==
- Leuzinger, Jürg, Das Zisterzienserinnenkloster Fraubrunnen. Von der Gründung bis zur Reformation 1246-1528 (Bern u.a., Peter Lang, 2008) (Europäische Hochschulschriften, Reihe 3: Geschichte und ihre Hilfswissenschaften, 1028).
