= Solothurn–Worblaufen railway =

Railway line in Switzerland

Overview
- Line number: 308
- Termini: Solothurn; Bern

Service
- Operator(s): Regionalverkehr Bern-Solothurn

Technical
- Line length: 29.71 km (18.46 mi)
- Number of tracks: 1–2
- Track gauge: 1,000 mm (3 ft 3 3/8 in)
- Electrification: 1250 V DC overhead catenary
- Maximum incline: 3.0%

The Solothurn–Worblaufen railway is a 29.71-kilometre-long (18.46 mi), metre-gauge and electrified railway in the cantons of Bern and Solothurn in Switzerland. The Solothurn–Zollikofen section was opened in 1916 by the Elektrische Schmalspurbahn Solothurn–Bern (Solothurn–Bern Electric Narrow-gauge Railway, ESB), which was merged with the Bern–Zollikofen Railway to form the Solothurn-Zollikofen-Bern Bahn (Solothurn-Zollikofen-Bern Railway, SZB) in 1922. The Zollikofen–Worblaufen line was opened in 1924, allowing trains to run directly between Bern and Solothurn (until then passengers had to change in Zollikofen). The two companies were merged into the Regionalverkehr Bern-Solothurn (RBS) in 1984. Passenger traffic is now integrated into the Bern S-Bahn, while operation of the remaining freight traffic was transferred to SBB Cargo in December 2012.

The line is served by line S8 and RE5 (RegioExpress) services. Worblaufen is the centre of operations and also has a depot and the RBS workshop. All trains run from Worblaufen ro Bern on the Zollikofen–Bern railway .

The line is constantly being improved. Except for a short section, there are multiple tracks between Worblaufen and Jegenstorf and between Grafenried and Fraubrunnen.

== Operating points ==
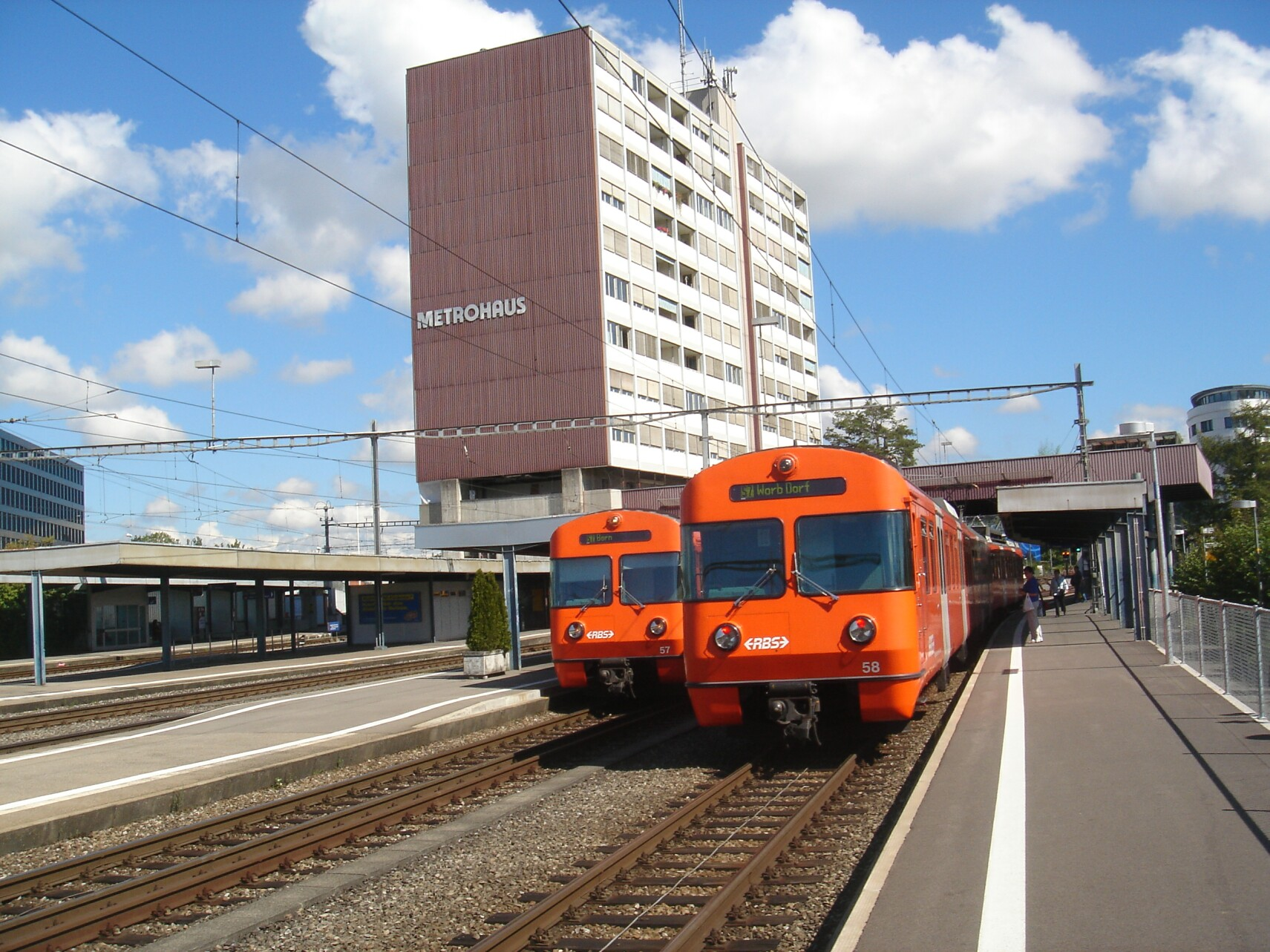
RBS trains in Worblaufen

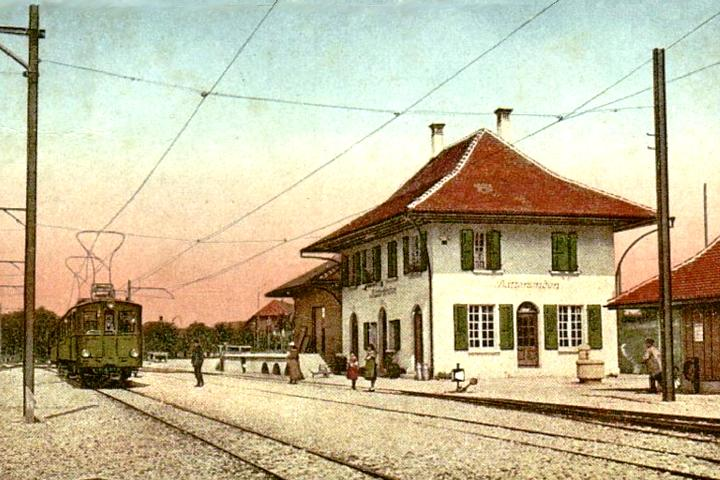
Bätterkinden station in 1916

Operating point	Track infrastructure	Opening	Remarks
Worblaufen	"Wedge" station: six tracks, two island platforms, two outside platforms	1912 *1973	Many sidings, several depot facilities, three tracks to Oberzollikofen
Oberzollikofen	Island platform and a third track	1974	Transfer track between standard and metre gauge (three tracks)
Zollikofen	Two outside platforms	1916 *2005	Common railway station with the SBB (lines S3 to Lyss – Biel/ Bienne, S4 to Burgdorf – Affoltern-Weier),
Prodega	Service station		Running towards Jegenstorf, after the one-track section at the underpass under SBB line to Biel.
Moosseedorf	Island platform	1916 *1990	Partly underground
Schönbühl-Shoppyland	Island platform and a siding	1975 *1999	
Schönbühl RBS	Two outer platforms	1916 *1989	New structure on other side of the level crossing
Urtenen	Two outside platforms		
Jegenstorf	An outside platform and an island platform, three tracks	1916 *1998	Track one is just a dead-end track
Grafenried	Two outside platforms	1916 *1956 *2008	
Fraubrunnen	Main station platform, island platform	1916 *2008	Island platform, unused in normal operations
Büren zum Hof	Two tracks, main platform	1916	Request stop, infrastructure warehouse
Schalunen	Halt	1916	Request stop
Hof	Service station	2002	End of the double track from Bätterkinden
Bätterkinden	Main station platform, island platform	1916	Sidings
Küttikofen-Kräiligen	Halt	1916	Request stop with reduced service until 2008, but now no longer served.
Lohn-Lüterkofen	Island platform	1916	Sidings
Ammannsegg	Halt	1916	Request stop with reduced service until 2008, but now no longer served.
Biberist RBS	Two outside platforms	1916 *2013	Two outside platforms, new platforms with a pedestrian underpass.
Bleichenberg	Halt	1916	Request stop with reduced service until 2008, but now no longer served.
Solothurn	Island platform	1916 *1968	Large rolling stock yard and depot
