= Libero-Tarifverbund =

The Libero-Tarifverbund is a Swiss tariff network covering the canton of Bern and the southwestern part of the canton of Solothurn. It was established in December 2004 from the merger of the Bäre-Abi and Frosch-Abo tariff networks. The Zig-Zag network merged into Libero in 2014. With the merger of the Tarifverbund Berner Oberland ("BeoAbo"), covering the Bernese Oberland, in December 2019, the network covers the entire canton of Bern.

The network is divided into three types of zones:

- Yellow: single-trip, multi-trip, day tickets, and subscriptions (monthly and annual) are valid
- Blue: shared with neighboring tariff associations; Libero tickets are valid for travel in or out of these zones and into yellow zones, but not for travel within the zones
- Green: only subscriptions are valid; most such zones are in the Bernese Oberland

== Partners ==
Libero partners with 28 operators:

- Aare Seeland mobil
- Aufzug Matte-Plattform (operates the Mattelift)
- Automobilverkehr Frutigen-Adelboden
- Bergbahn Lauterbrunnen-Mürren
- Bergbahnen Meiringen-Hasliberg
- Bernese Oberland Railway
- BERNMOBIL
- BLS AG
- Busbetrieb Grenchen und Umgebung
- Busbetrieb Solothurn und Umgebung
- Busland
- Chemins de fer du Jura
- Compagnie Chemin de fer Montreux-Oberland Bernois
- Funiculaire Saint-Imier - Mont-Soleil
- Grindelwald Bus
- Gurten Funicular
- Meiringen-Innertkirchen-Bahn
- Marzili Funicular
- Niederhornbahn
- PostBus Switzerland
- Regionalverkehr Bern-Solothurn
- Schilthornbahn
- Swiss Federal Railways
- STI Bus
- Transports publics Fribourgeois
- Verkehrsbetriebe Biel/Transports publics biennois
- Wengernalpbahn
- Zentralbahn
