= Regionalverkehr Bern-Solothurn =

Swiss public transport company

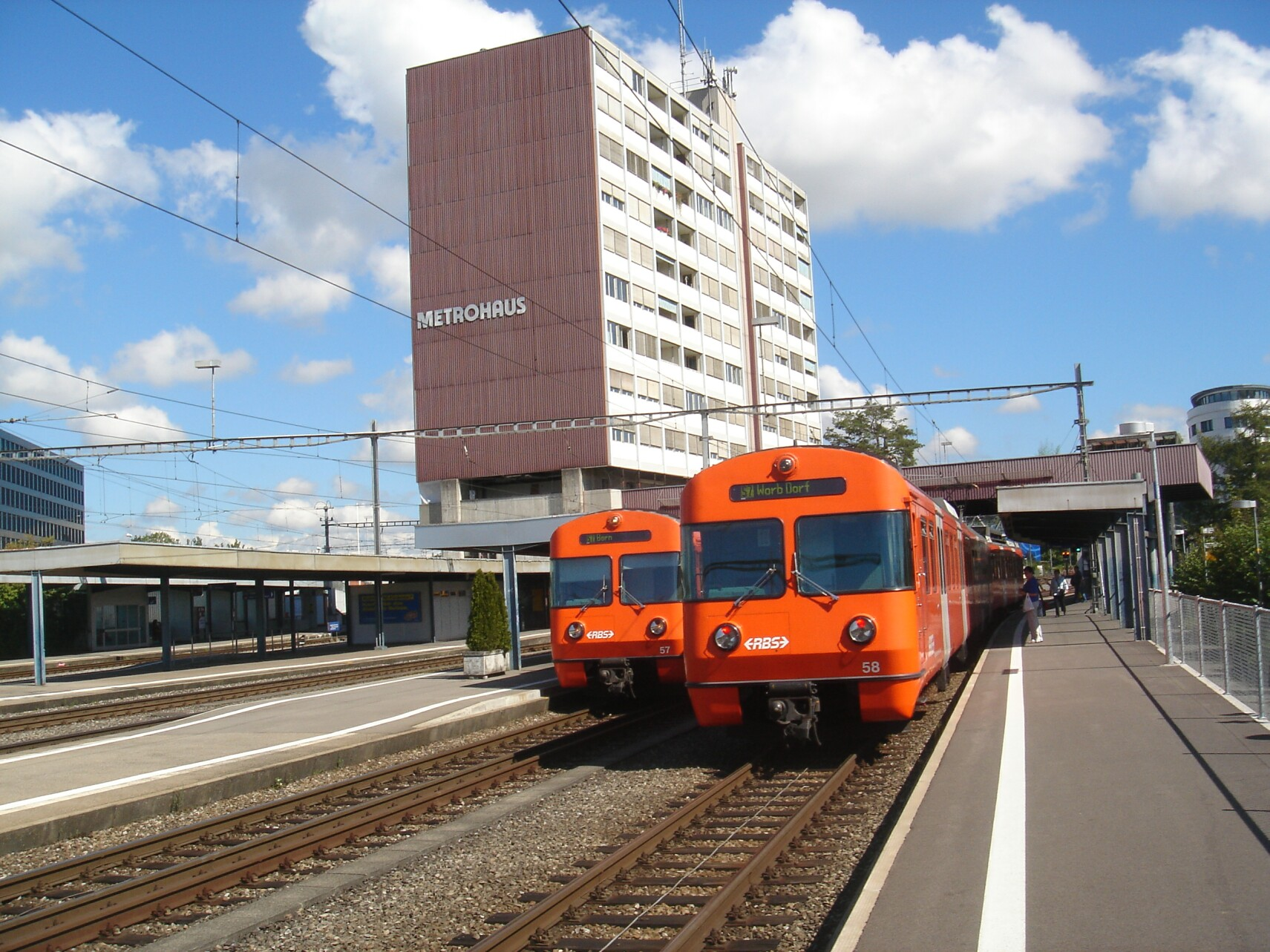
RBS trains in Worblaufen

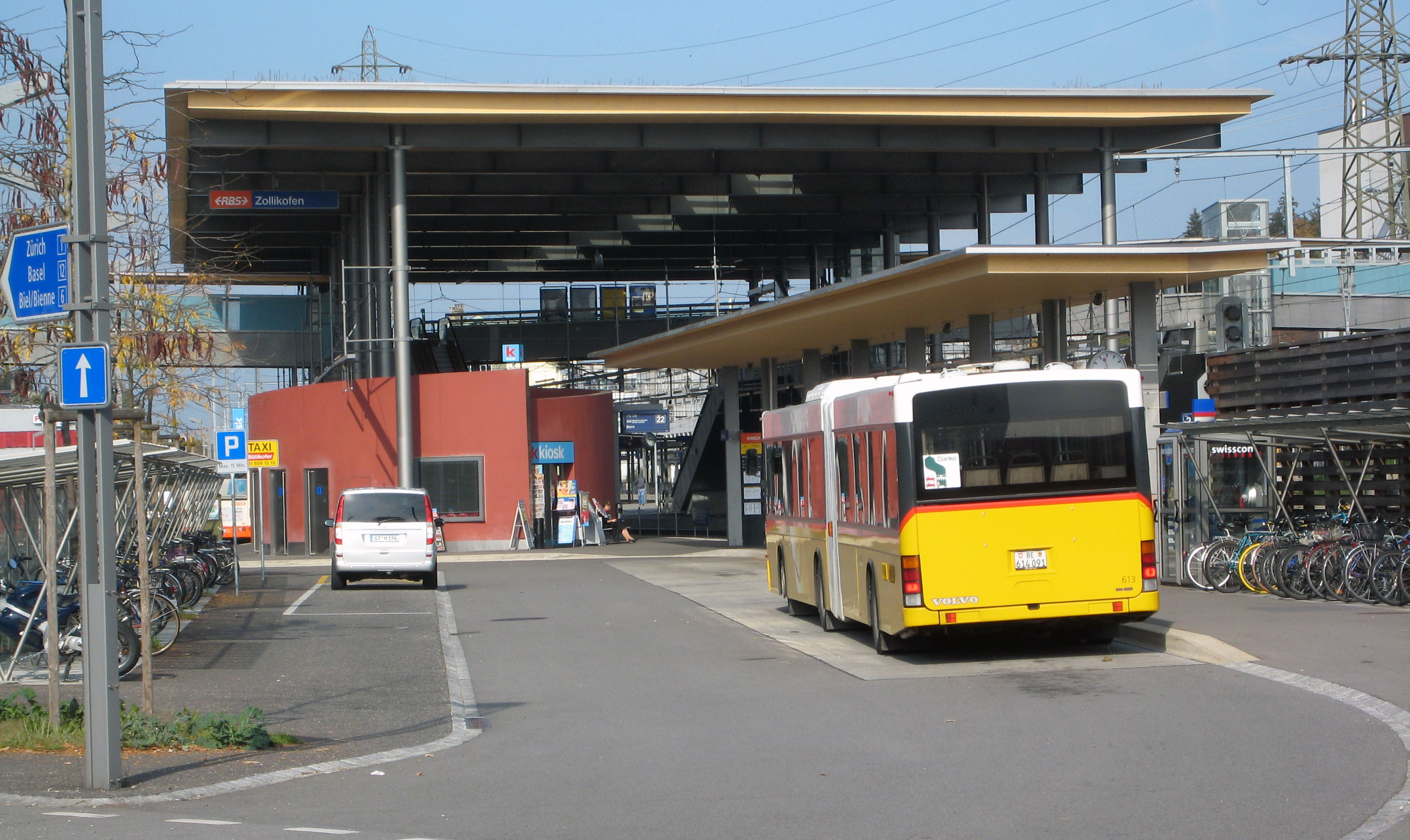
RBS train and bus station in Zollikofen. The yellow bus is operated by Swiss Post.

Regionalverkehr Bern-Solothurn RBS (English: Regional Transport Bern-Solothurn) is a Swiss public transport company. It operates train, tram, and bus lines between Bern, Solothurn and Worb.

== History ==
There had been a desire for a direct connection between Solothurn and Bern since the middle of the nineteenth century, only partly satisfied by the opening of a standard gauge line between Solothurn and Burgdorf by the Emmentalbahn in 1876. A campaign for a line via Fraubrunnen finally resulted in a concession granted in 1912 for the Elektrische Solothurn-Bern-Bahn (ESB) to build a metre-gauge line between Solothurn and Zollikofen. Here it would connect with the Bern-Zollikofen-Bahn, which had been opened in the same year. The full line was opened on 9 April 1916, but for the first eight years, passengers were obliged to change trains in Zollikofen. Public pressure led to the fusion of the two lines into the Solothurn-Zollikofen-Bahn (SZB) in 1922.

The town of Worb had been connected to Bern by the Bern-Worb-Bahn (BWB) in 1898, and the Worblentalbahn subsequently connected Worb with the villages of the Worble valley, making a connection with the BZB line at Worblaufen. The two lines to Worb fused in 1927 into the Vereinigte Bern-Worb-Bahnen (VBW). After a series of working agreements in the 1970s, the SZB and the VWB finally merged into the RBS in November 1984 through a series of mergers. 94% of RBS shares are owned by federal, cantonal and local authorities.

As of 2006, the company has 361 employees and owns 185 vehicles. It operates on 57 km (35 mi) of track and 61 km (38 mi) of bus lines and transports 23.5 million passengers each year. The subterranean RBS train station in Bern is the country's eighth-largest in terms of passenger usage, with 49,000 people using it on peak days. This heavy usage leads to overcrowding during peak hours. To increase the station's passenger handling capacity and reduce overcrowding, strict rules have been put into place to govern passenger flow.

A steady programme of track-doubling has significantly increased track capacity. Planning has already started to increase the size and capacity of the station in terms of passenger flow and number of trains it can handle. In 2009, a 15-minute interval for all lines was planned, which takes the station to the limit of its ability to handle passengers.

New 120 km/h (75 mph) train sets have been introduced on the RE line (Bern - Solothurn) to enable running at 15-minute intervals. These sets were made by Stadler Rail AG.

== Lines ==
=== Train ===
Line	Route	Length	Source
S7	Bern–Worb Dorf	15.1 km (9.4 mi)	
S8	Bern–Bätterkinden	13.6 km (8.5 mi)	
S9	Bern–Unterzollikofen	5.4 km (3.4 mi)	
RE	Bern–Solothurn	33.6 km (20.9 mi)	

=== Tram ===
Line	Route	Length	Source
6	Bern Fischermätteli–Worb Dorf	13.1 km (8.1 mi)	

=== Bus ===
Line	Route
8	Solothurn – Büren an der Aare
33	Worblaufen – Reichenbach – Bremgarten
34	Unterzollikofen – Hirzenfeld
36	Breitenrain – Worblaufen – Zollikofen – Münchenbuchsee
38	Schönbühl – Bäriswil – Mattstetten
40	Kappelisacker – Papiermühle – Schosshalde – Egghölzli – Muri – Allmendingen / Sonnenfeld
41	Zollikofen – Kappelisacker – Papiermühle – Breitenrain
43	Ittigen Bahnhof – Kappelisacker – Ittigen Bahnhof
44	Bolligen – Ostermundigen – Gümligen
46	Bolligen – Habstetten
47	Bolligen – Mannenberg
48	Papiermühle – Kappelisacker – Lutertal – Habstetten – Bolligen Bahnhof
362	Lyss – Schnottwil
363	Lyss – Grossaffoltern – Bätterkinden
367	City bus Lyss
368	City bus Lyss
871	Wengi b. Büren – Jegenstorf
884	Bätterkinden – Utzenstorf – Koppigen
898	Büren an der Aare – Zollikofen

== Rolling stock ==
=== Rail ===
Name	Number of units	In service	Capacity	Top speed	About	Image	Source
Be 4/10 Worbla	17	2018–present	510 (130 seated)	100 km/h (62 mph)	Built in 2018, 2019, and 2020 by Stadler Rail. Replaced the Be 4/12 Mandarinli units on the S7 line. Also used on the S9 line.		
RABe 4/12 NExT	13	2009–present	443 (154 seated)	120 km/h (75 mph)	Built in 2009 and 2013 by Stadler Rail. Replaced the ABe 4/12 La Prima units on the RE line.		
Be 4/12 Seconda	11	2010–present	418(178 seated)	90 km/h (56 mph)	Rebuilt from ABe 4/12 La Prima units from 2010 to 2013. Used on the S8 and S9 lines. Also sometimes used on the RE line.		
Be 4/10 Blaus Bähnli	9	2010–present	148 (88 seated)	65 km/h (40 mph)	Rebuilt from Be 4/8 Blaus Bähnli units in 2010. The rebuild included the addition of a new car in the middle of each unit. The new cars were built by Stadler Rail and included lower floors to allow for level boarding. Operated by Bernmobil on the tram line 6.		
Be 4/8 Blaus Bähnli	9	1987-2010	123 (73 seated)	65 km/h (40 mph)	Built by SWP, SIG, and ABB in 1987. Used on the G line.		

== See also ==
- Transport in Switzerland
