= Worblaufen railway station =

Railway station in Ittigen, Switzerland

Worblaufen
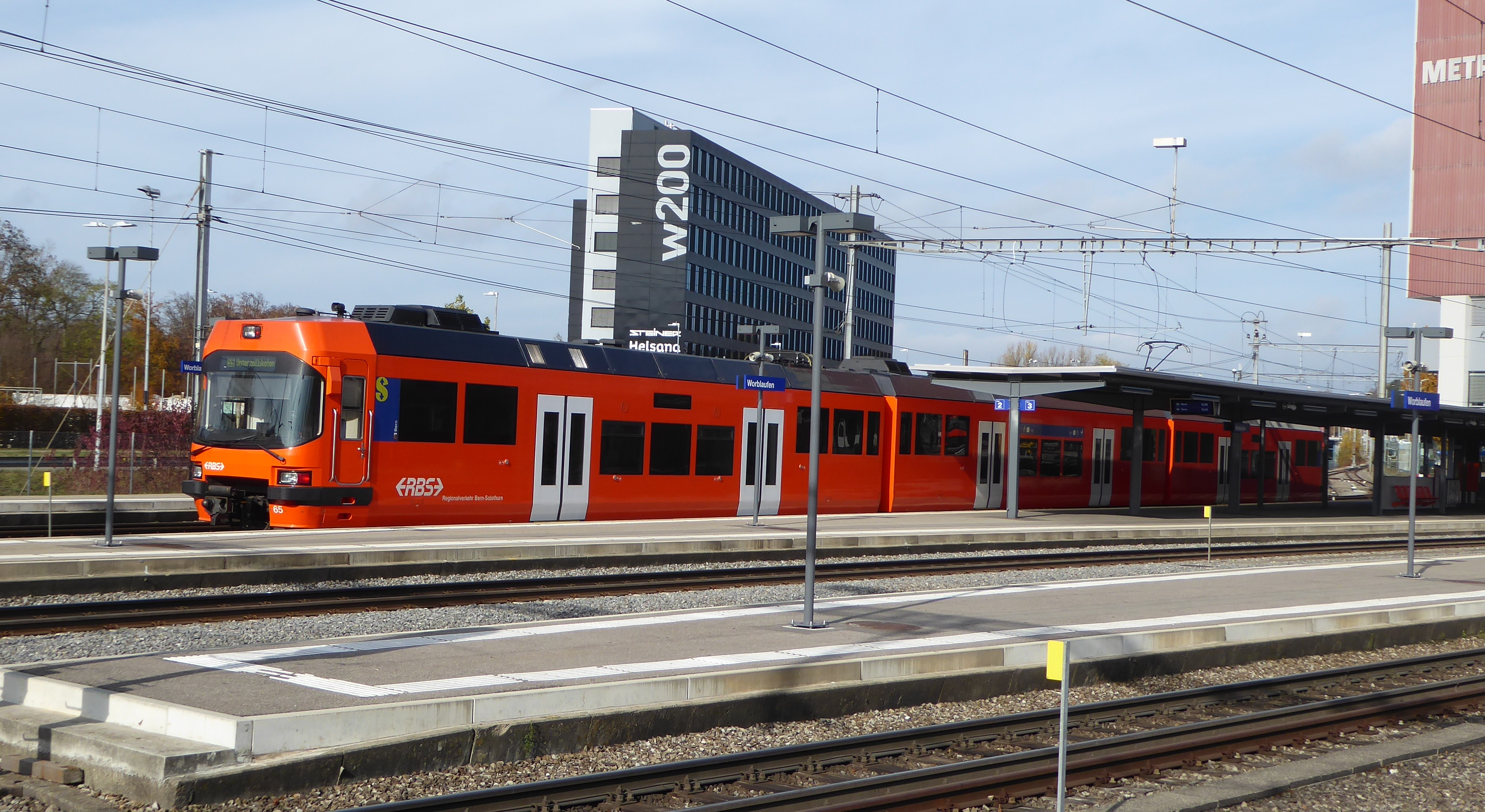
- A RBS train at the station in 2018

General information
- Location: Ittigen; Switzerland
- Coordinates: 46°58′44″N 7°27′29″E
- Elevation: 520 m (1,710 ft)
- Owner: Regionalverkehr Bern-Solothurn
- Lines: Solothurn–Worblaufen line; Worb Dorf–Worblaufen line; Zollikofen–Bern line
- Distance: 29.7 km (18.5 mi) from Solothurn
- Platforms: 6: 2 side platforms; 2 island platforms
- Tracks: 6
- Train operators: Regionalverkehr Bern-Solothurn
- Connections: RBS buses

Construction
- Accessible: Yes

Other information
- Station code: 8508054 (WBL)
- Fare zone: 101 (Libero)

Services
Preceding station	Bern S-Bahn	Following station
Bern Terminus	S7	Papiermühle towards Worb Dorf
Bern Terminus	S7 Rush-hour service	Papiermühle towards Bolligen
Bern Terminus	S8	Oberzollikofen towards Jegenstorf or Bätterkinden
Bern Tiefenau towards Bern	S9	Steinibach towards Unterzollikofen
Location

Worblaufen railway station (German: Bahnhof Worblaufen) is a railway station situated in the municipality of Ittigen, within the canton of Bern in Switzerland. The station serves as a keilbahnhof, a term used to describe a wedge-shaped or junction station. It specifically operates as the nexus for three 1,000 mm (3 ft 3+3/8 in) gauge lines managed by the Regionalverkehr Bern-Solothurn (RBS) network. These lines include Solothurn–Worblaufen, Worb Dorf–Worblaufen, and Zollikofen–Bern.

== Services ==
The following services stop at Worblaufen:

- Bern S-Bahn:
  - S7: service every fifteen minutes between Bern and Worb Dorf
    - Rush-hour service between Bern and Bolligen.
  - S8: service every fifteen minutes between Bern and Jegenstorf, half-hourly service from Jegenstorf to Bätterkinden.
  - S9: service every fifteen minutes between Bern and Unterzollikofen.
