= Papiermühle railway station =

Railway station in Ittigen, Switzerland

Papiermühle
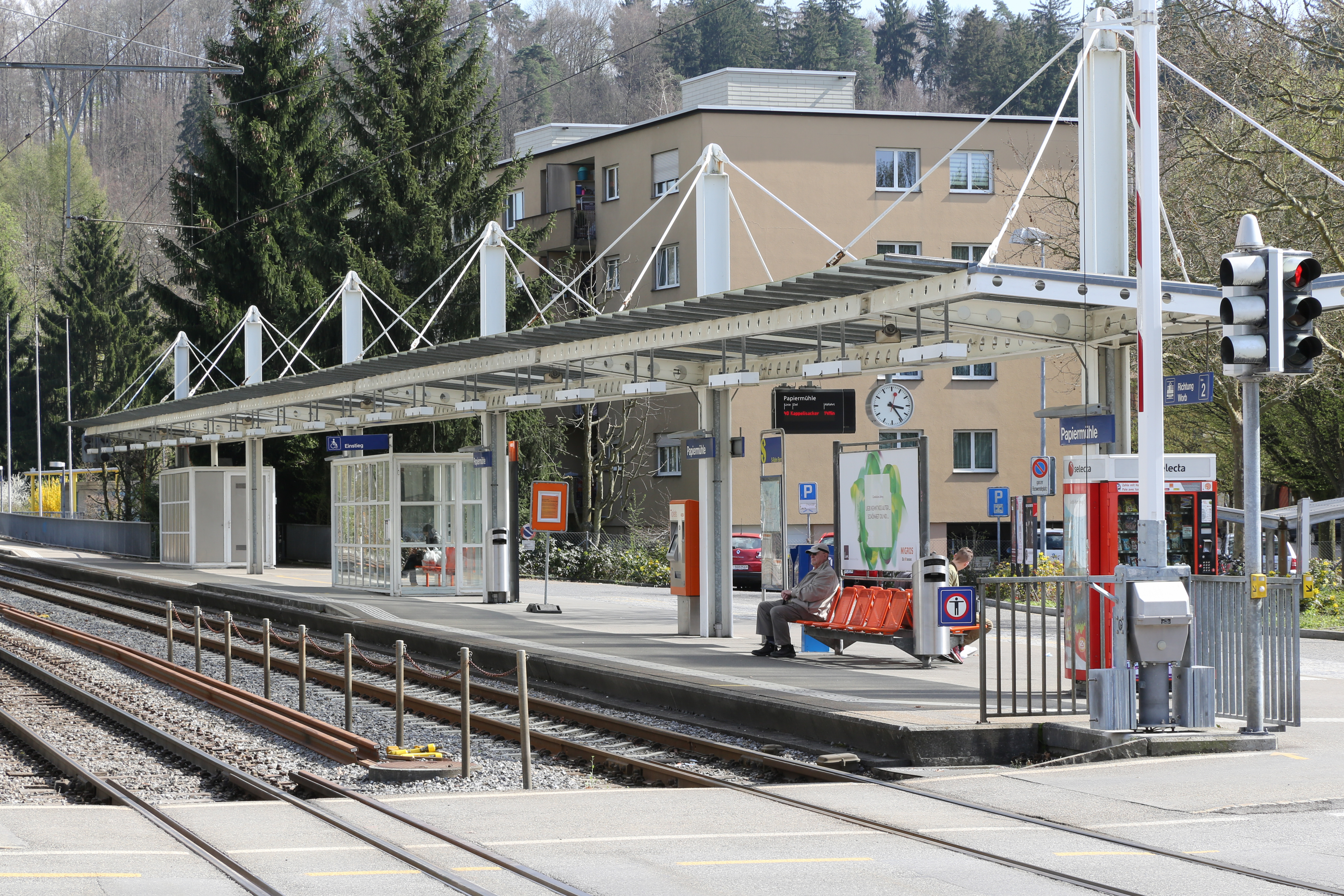
- The station platform in 2014

General information
- Location: Ittigen; Switzerland
- Coordinates: 46°58′26″N 7°28′37″E
- Elevation: 523 m (1,716 ft)
- Owner: Regionalverkehr Bern-Solothurn
- Line: Worb Dorf–Worblaufen line
- Platforms: 2 side platforms
- Tracks: 2
- Train operators: Regionalverkehr Bern-Solothurn
- Connections: RBS buses

Other information
- Station code: 8507096 (PAPI)
- Fare zone: 101 (Libero)

Services
| Preceding station | Bern S-Bahn | Following station |
|---|---|---|
| Worblaufen towards Bern | S7 | Ittigen bei Bern towards Worb Dorf |
| Worblaufen towards Bern | S7 Rush-hour service | Ittigen bei Bern towards Bolligen |
Location

Papiermühle railway station (German: Bahnhof Papiermühle) is a railway station in the municipality of Ittigen, in the Swiss canton of Bern. It is an intermediate stop on the 1,000 mm (3 ft 3 3/8 in) gauge Worb Dorf–Worblaufen line of Regionalverkehr Bern-Solothurn.

== Services ==
The following services stop at Papiermühle:

- Bern S-Bahn:
  - S7: Service every fifteen minutes between Bern and Worb Dorf
  - Rush-hour service between Bern and Bolligen.
