= Bern Tiefenau railway station =

Railway station in Bern, Switzerland

Bern Tiefenau
- The station platforms in 2018

General information
- Location: Bern; Switzerland
- Coordinates: 46°58′23″N 7°27′00″E
- Elevation: 531 m (1,742 ft)
- Owner: Regionalverkehr Bern-Solothurn
- Line: Zollikofen–Bern line
- Distance: 30.6 km (19.0 mi) from Solothurn
- Platforms: 2 side platforms
- Tracks: 2
- Train operators: Regionalverkehr Bern-Solothurn

Construction
- Structure type: Underground
- Accessible: Yes

Other information
- Station code: 8508052 (BNTI)
- Fare zone: 100 (Libero)

Services
Preceding station	Bern S-Bahn	Following station
Bern Felsenau towards Bern	S9	Worblaufen towards Unterzollikofen
Location

Bern Tiefenau railway station (German: Bahnhof Bern Tiefenau) is a railway station in the municipality of Bern, in the Swiss canton of Bern. It is an intermediate stop on the 1,000 mm (3 ft 3 3/8 in) gauge Zollikofen–Bern line of Regionalverkehr Bern-Solothurn.

== Services ==
The following services stop at Bern Tiefenau:

- Bern S-Bahn: S9: service every fifteen minutes between Bern and Unterzollikofen.
