= Ittigen bei Bern railway station =

Railway station in Ittigen, Switzerland

Ittigen bei Bern
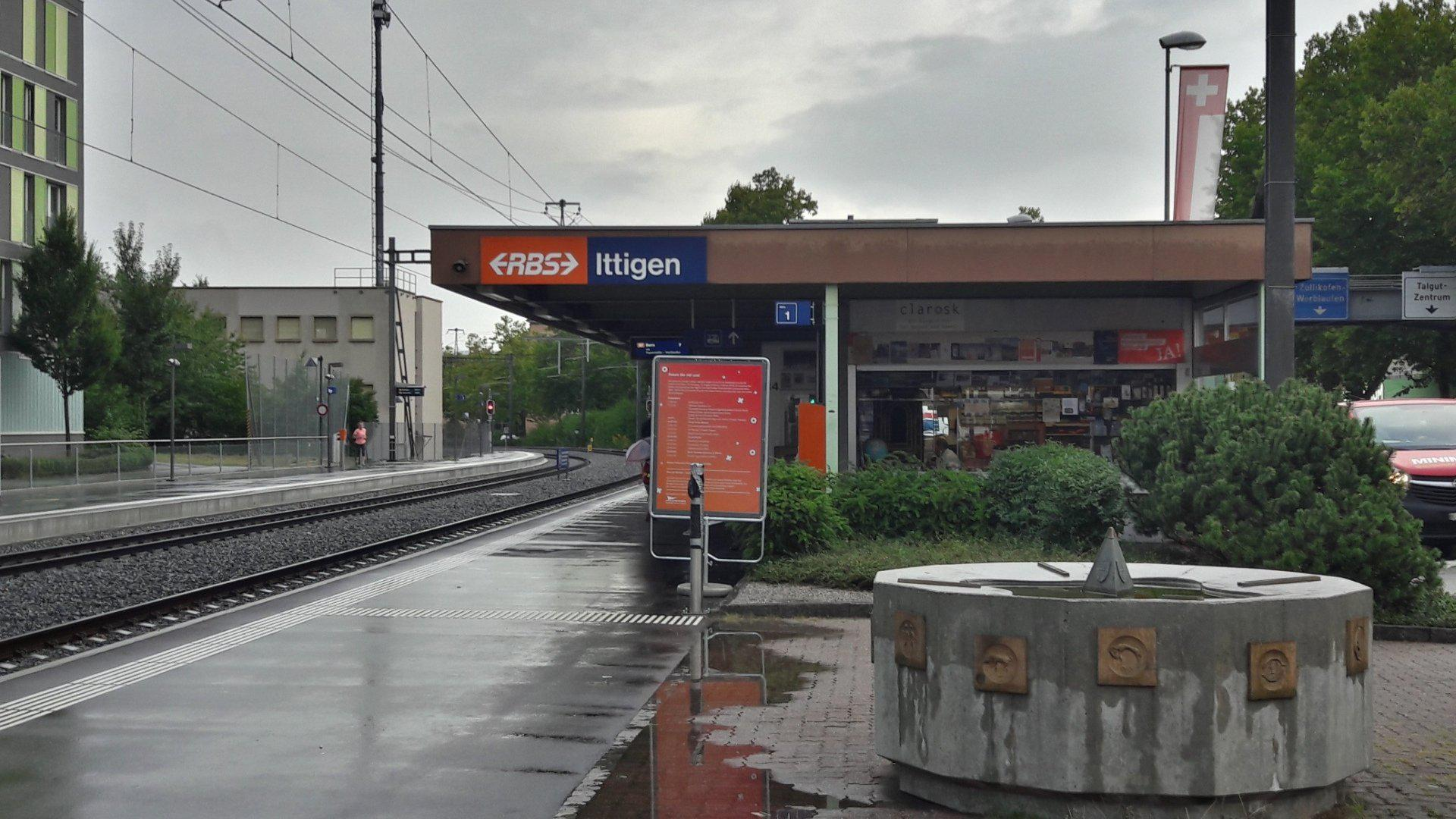
- The station in 2018

General information
- Location: Ittigen; Switzerland
- Coordinates: 46°58′23″N 7°29′02″E
- Elevation: 529 m (1,736 ft)
- Owner: Regionalverkehr Bern-Solothurn
- Line: Worb Dorf–Worblaufen line
- Platforms: 2 side platforms
- Tracks: 2
- Train operators: Regionalverkehr Bern-Solothurn
- Connections: RBS bus line

Construction
- Accessible: Yes

Other information
- Station code: 8507069 (ITT)
- Fare zone: 101 (Libero)

Services
Preceding station	Bern S-Bahn	Following station
Papiermühle towards Bern	S7	Bolligen towards Worb Dorf
Papiermühle towards Bern	S7 Rush-hour service	Bolligen Terminus
Location

Ittigen bei Bern railway station (German: Bahnhof Ittigen bei Bern), also known as Ittigen railway station, is a railway station in the municipality of Ittigen, in the Swiss canton of Bern. It is an intermediate stop on the 1,000 mm (3 ft 3 3/8 in) gauge Worb Dorf–Worblaufen line of Regionalverkehr Bern-Solothurn.

== Services ==
The following services stop at Ittigen bei Bern:

- Bern S-Bahn:
  - S7: Service every fifteen minutes between Bern and Worb Dorf
  - Rush-hour service between Bern and Bolligen.
