= Boll-Utzigen railway station =

Railway station in Vechigen, Switzerland

Boll-Utzigen
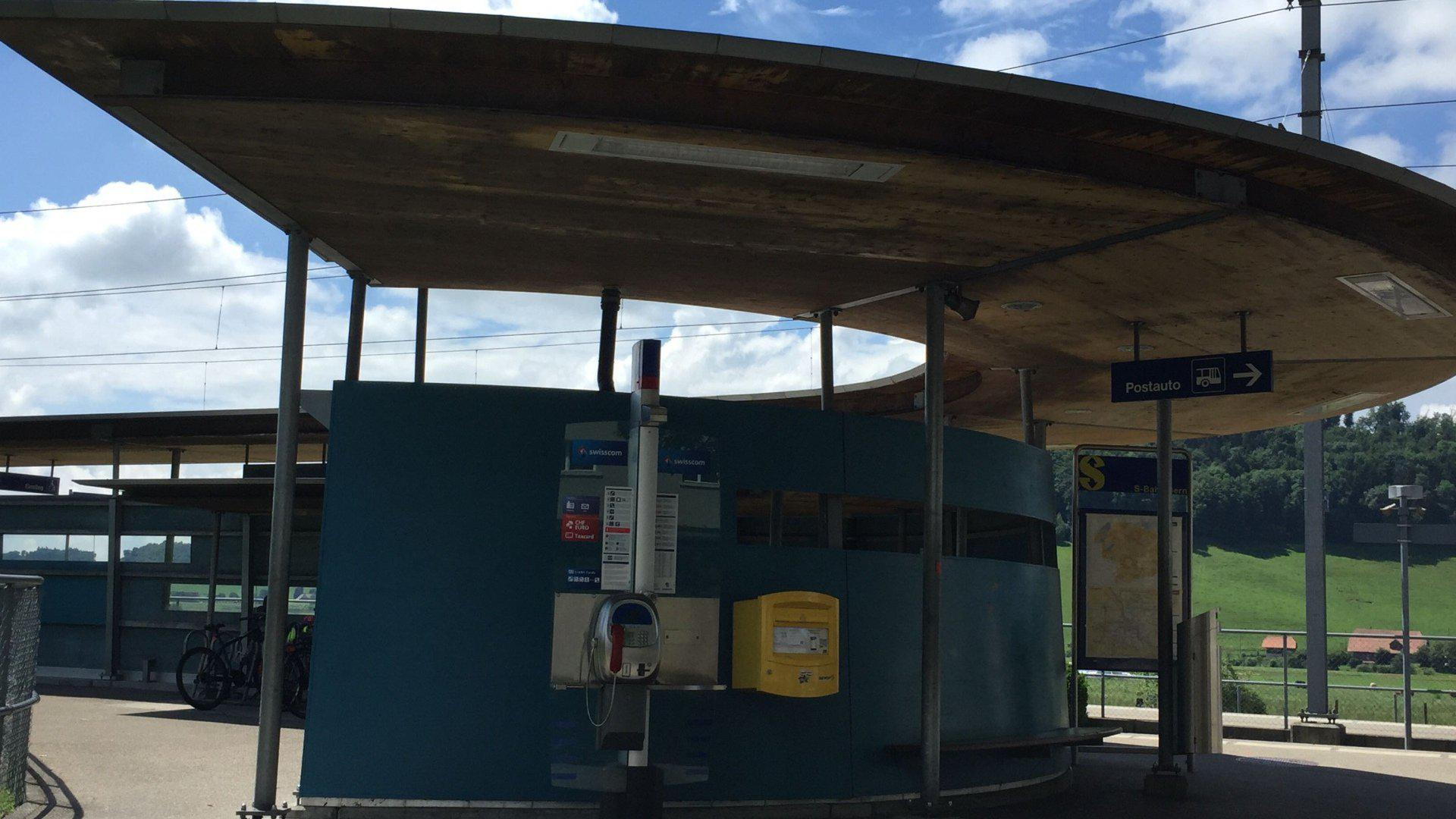
- The station platform in 2018

General information
- Location: Vechigen; Switzerland
- Coordinates: 46°57′14″N 7°32′49″E
- Elevation: 567 m (1,860 ft)
- Owner: Regionalverkehr Bern-Solothurn
- Line: Worb Dorf–Worblaufen line
- Platforms: 2 side platforms
- Tracks: 2
- Train operators: Regionalverkehr Bern-Solothurn
- Connections: PostAuto AG buses

Construction
- Parking: Yes (16 spaces)
- Accessible: Yes

Other information
- Station code: 8507065 (BOUT)
- Fare zone: 115 (Libero)

Services
Preceding station	Bern S-Bahn	Following station
Stettlen towards Bern	S7	Vechigen towards Worb Dorf
Location

Boll-Utzigen railway station (German: Bahnhof Boll-Utzigen) is a railway station in the municipality of Vechigen, in the Swiss canton of Bern. It is an intermediate stop on the 1,000 mm (3 ft 3 3/8 in) gauge Worb Dorf–Worblaufen line of Regionalverkehr Bern-Solothurn.

== Services ==
The following services stop at Boll-Utzigen:

- Bern S-Bahn: S7: service every fifteen minutes between Bern and Worb Dorf.
