= Jürg =

Jürg is the name of:

- Jürg Amann (1947–2013), Swiss author and dramatist
- Jürg Baur (1918–2010), German composer and teacher of classical music
- Jürg Berger (born 1954), retired Swiss professional ice hockey forward
- Jürg Capol (born 1965), Swiss cross country skier
- Jürg Federspiel (1931–2007), Swiss writer
- Hans-Jürg Fehr (born 1948), president (2004-2008) of the Social Democratic Party of Switzerland
- Jürg Fröhlich (born 1946), Swiss mathematician and theoretical physicist
- Jürg Kreienbühl (1932–2007), Swiss and French painter
- Jürg M. Stauffer (born 1977), Swiss politician
- Jürg Studer (born 1966), Swiss football defender
- Jürg Wenger (born 1969), Swiss skeleton racer
