= Deisswil railway station =

Railway station in Stettlen, Switzerland

Deisswil
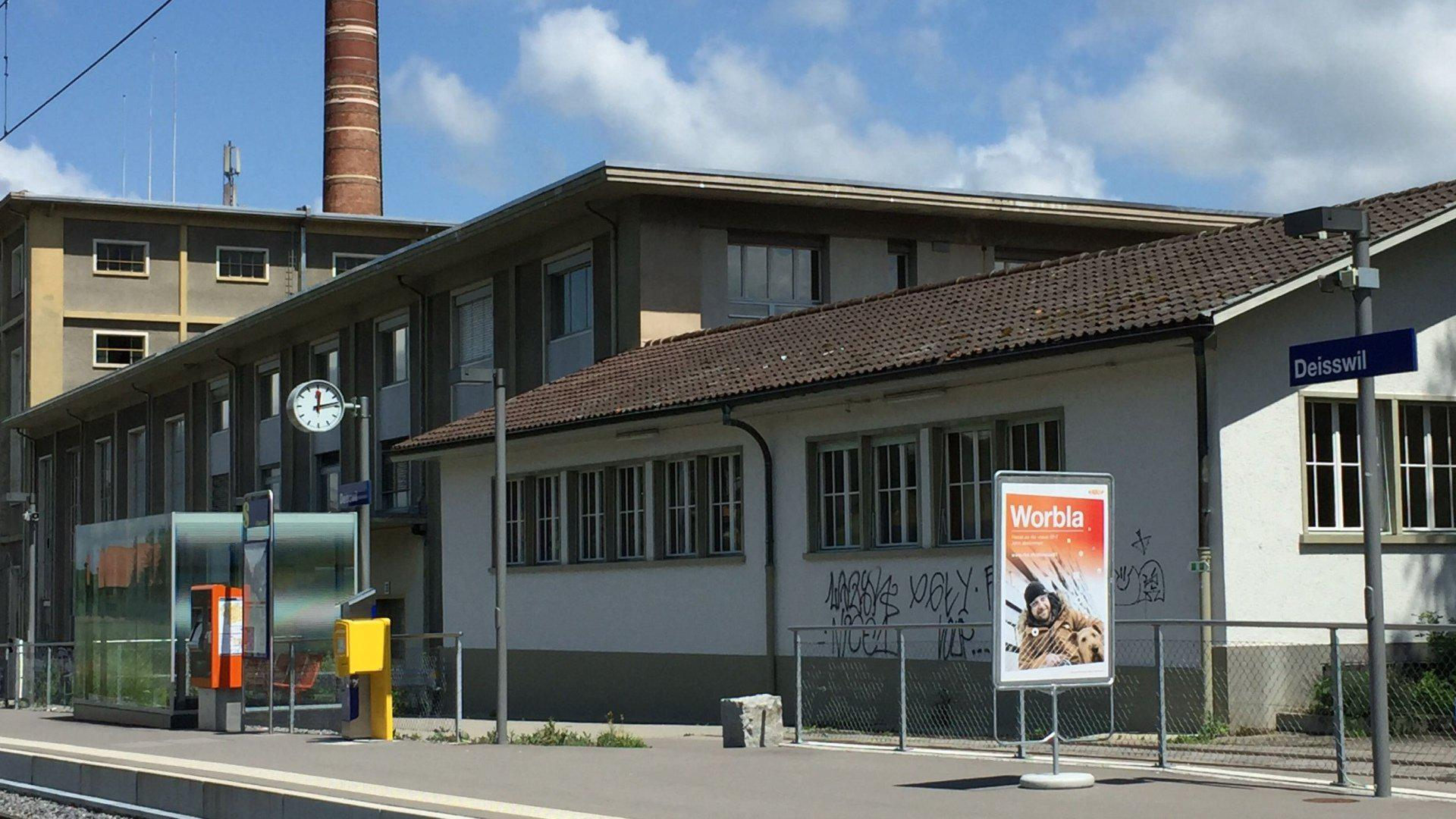
- The station platform in 2018

General information
- Location: Stettlen; Switzerland
- Coordinates: 46°57′25″N 7°30′50″E
- Elevation: 552 m (1,811 ft)
- Owner: Regionalverkehr Bern-Solothurn
- Line: Worb Dorf–Worblaufen line
- Platforms: 1 side platform
- Tracks: 1
- Train operators: Regionalverkehr Bern-Solothurn

Construction
- Accessible: Yes

Other information
- Station code: 8507067 (DEI)
- Fare zone: 101 (Libero)

Services
| Preceding station | Bern S-Bahn | Following station |
|---|---|---|
| Bolligen towards Bern | S7 | Stettlen towards Worb Dorf |
Location

Deisswil railway station (German: Bahnhof Deisswil) is a railway station in the municipality of Stettlen, in the Swiss canton of Bern. It is an intermediate stop on the 1,000 mm (3 ft 3 3/8 in) gauge Worb Dorf–Worblaufen line of Regionalverkehr Bern-Solothurn.

== Services ==
The following services stop at Deisswil:

- Bern S-Bahn S7: service every fifteen minutes between Bern and Worb Dorf.
