= Stettlen railway station =

Railway station in Stettlen, Switzerland

Stettlen
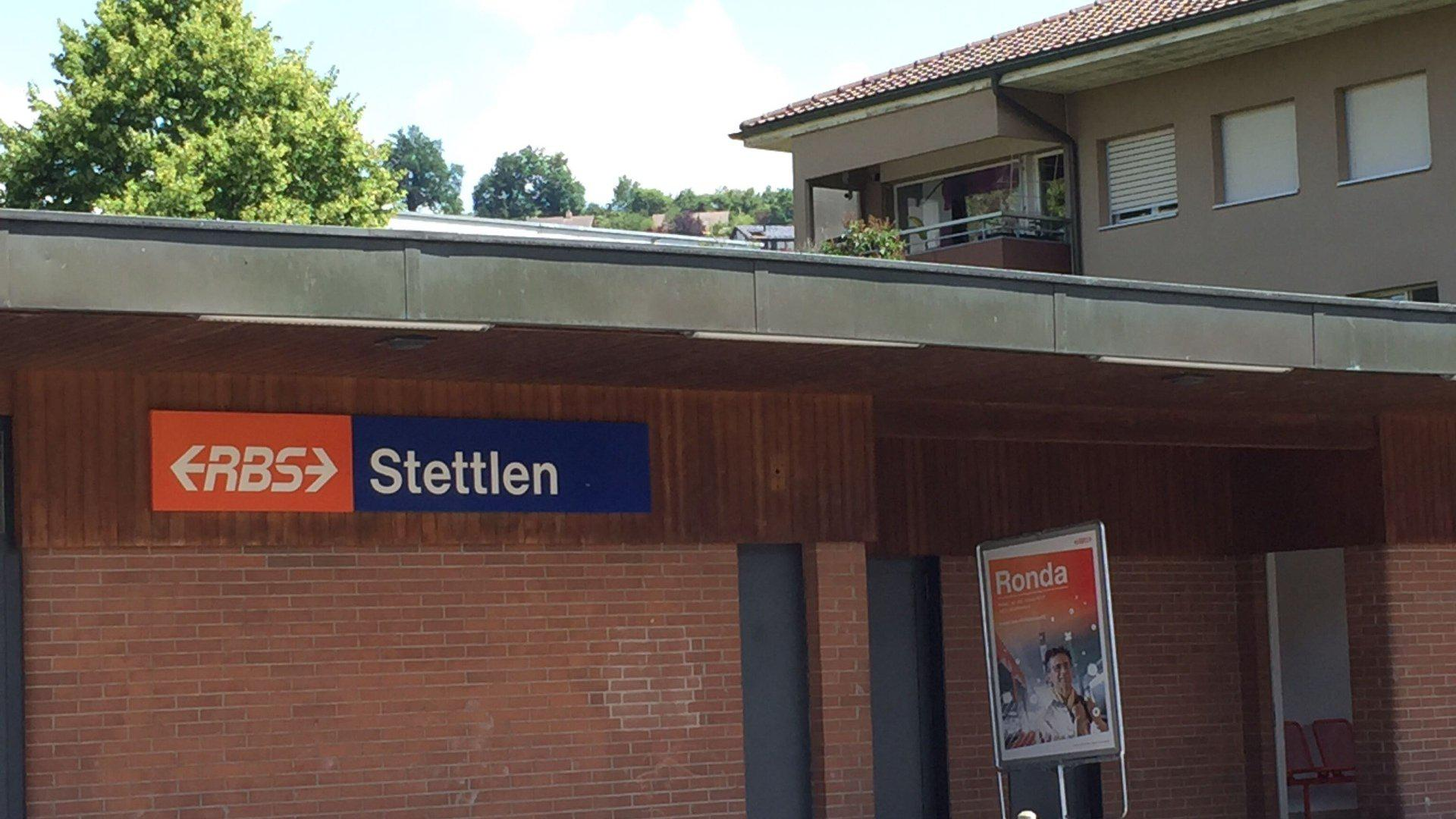
- The station building in 2018

General information
- Location: Stettlen; Switzerland
- Coordinates: 46°57′25″N 7°31′26″E
- Elevation: 555 m (1,821 ft)
- Owner: Regionalverkehr Bern-Solothurn
- Line: Worb Dorf–Worblaufen line
- Platforms: 2 side platforms
- Tracks: 2
- Train operators: Regionalverkehr Bern-Solothurn

Construction
- Accessible: Yes

Other information
- Station code: 8507066 (STTL)
- Fare zone: 101 (Libero)

Services
Preceding station	Bern S-Bahn	Following station
Deisswil towards Bern	S7	Boll-Utzigen towards Worb Dorf
Location

Stettlen railway station (German: Bahnhof Stettlen) is a railway station in the municipality of Stettlen, in the Swiss canton of Bern. It is an intermediate stop on the 1,000 mm (3 ft 3 3/8 in) gauge Worb Dorf–Worblaufen line of Regionalverkehr Bern-Solothurn.

== Services ==
The following services stop at Stettlen:

- Bern S-Bahn S7: service every 15 minutes between Bern and Worb Dorf.
