= Steinibach railway station =

Railway station in Zollikofen, Switzerland

Steinibach
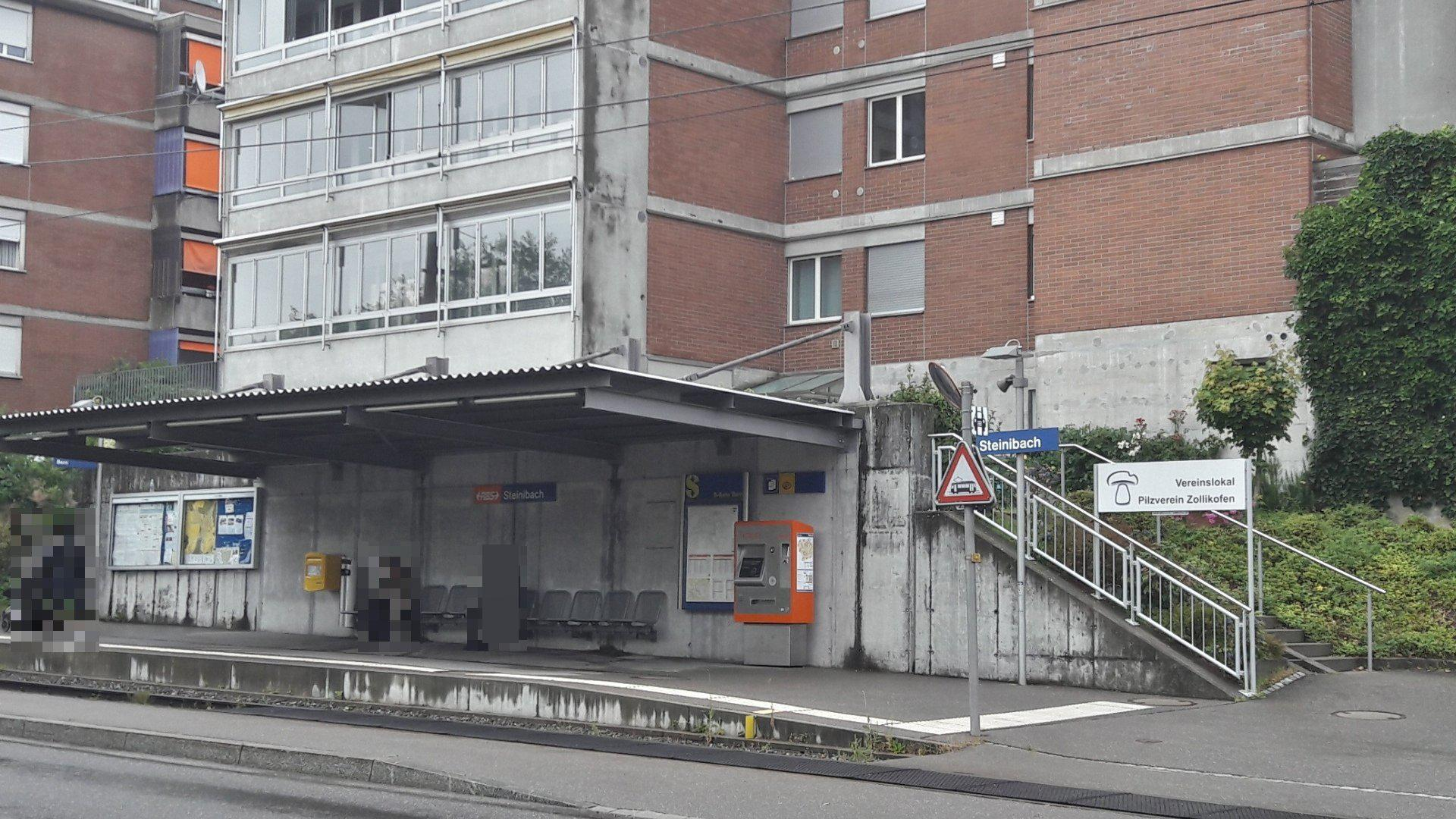
- The station platforms in 2018

General information
- Location: Zollikofen; Switzerland
- Coordinates: 46°58′59″N 7°27′29″E
- Elevation: 525 m (1,722 ft)
- Owner: Regionalverkehr Bern-Solothurn
- Line: Zollikofen–Bern line
- Platforms: 1 side platform
- Tracks: 1
- Train operators: Regionalverkehr Bern-Solothurn
- Connections: RBS buses

Construction
- Accessible: Yes

Other information
- Station code: 8508053 (STBA)
- Fare zone: 101 (Libero)

Services
Preceding station	Bern S-Bahn	Following station
Worblaufen towards Bern	S9	Unterzollikofen Terminus
Location

Steinibach railway station (German: Bahnhof Steinibach) is a railway station in the municipality of Zollikofen, in the Swiss canton of Bern. It is an intermediate stop on the 1,000 mm (3 ft 3 3/8 in) gauge Zollikofen–Bern line of Regionalverkehr Bern-Solothurn.

== Services ==
The following services stop at Steinibach:

- Bern S-Bahn S9: service every fifteen minutes between Bern and Unterzollikofen.
