= Vechigen railway station =

Railway station in Vechigen, Switzerland

Vechigen
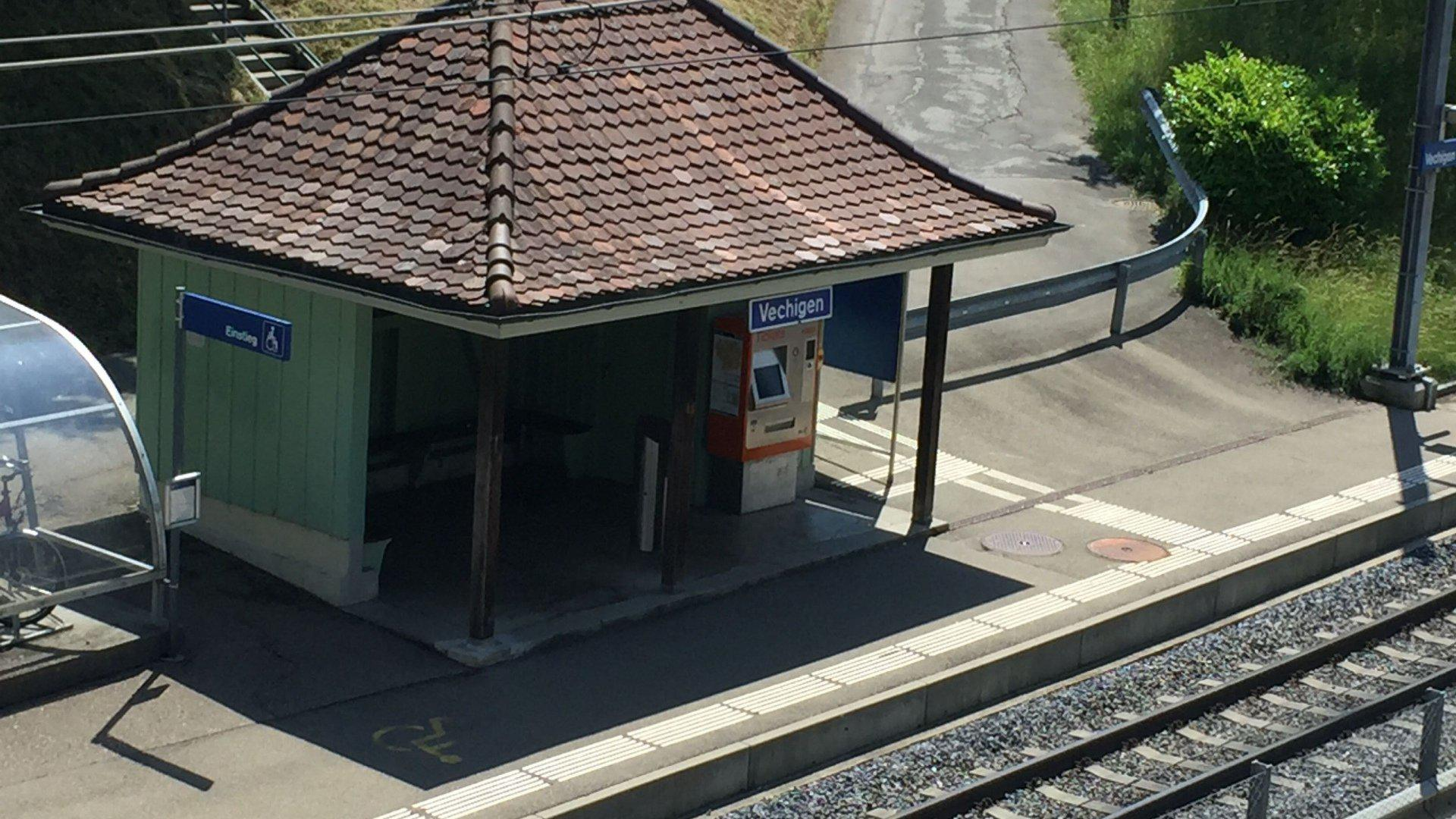
- The station platform in 2018

General information
- Location: Vechigen; Switzerland
- Coordinates: 46°56′49″N 7°33′22″E
- Elevation: 583 m (1,913 ft)
- Owner: Regionalverkehr Bern-Solothurn
- Line: Worb Dorf–Worblaufen line
- Platforms: 1 side platform
- Tracks: 1
- Train operators: Regionalverkehr Bern-Solothurn

Construction
- Accessible: Yes

Other information
- Station code: 8507064 (VECH)
- Fare zone: 115 (Libero)

Services
Preceding station	Bern S-Bahn	Following station
Boll-Utzigen towards Bern	S7	Worbboden towards Worb Dorf
Location

Vechigen railway station (German: Bahnhof Vechigen) is a railway station in the municipality of Vechigen, in the Swiss canton of Bern. It is an intermediate stop on the 1,000 mm (3 ft 3 3/8 in) gauge Worb Dorf–Worblaufen line of Regionalverkehr Bern-Solothurn.

== Services ==
The following services stop at Vechigen:

- Bern S-Bahn: S7: service every fifteen minutes between Bern and Worb Dorf.
