= Zollikofen =

- Municipality
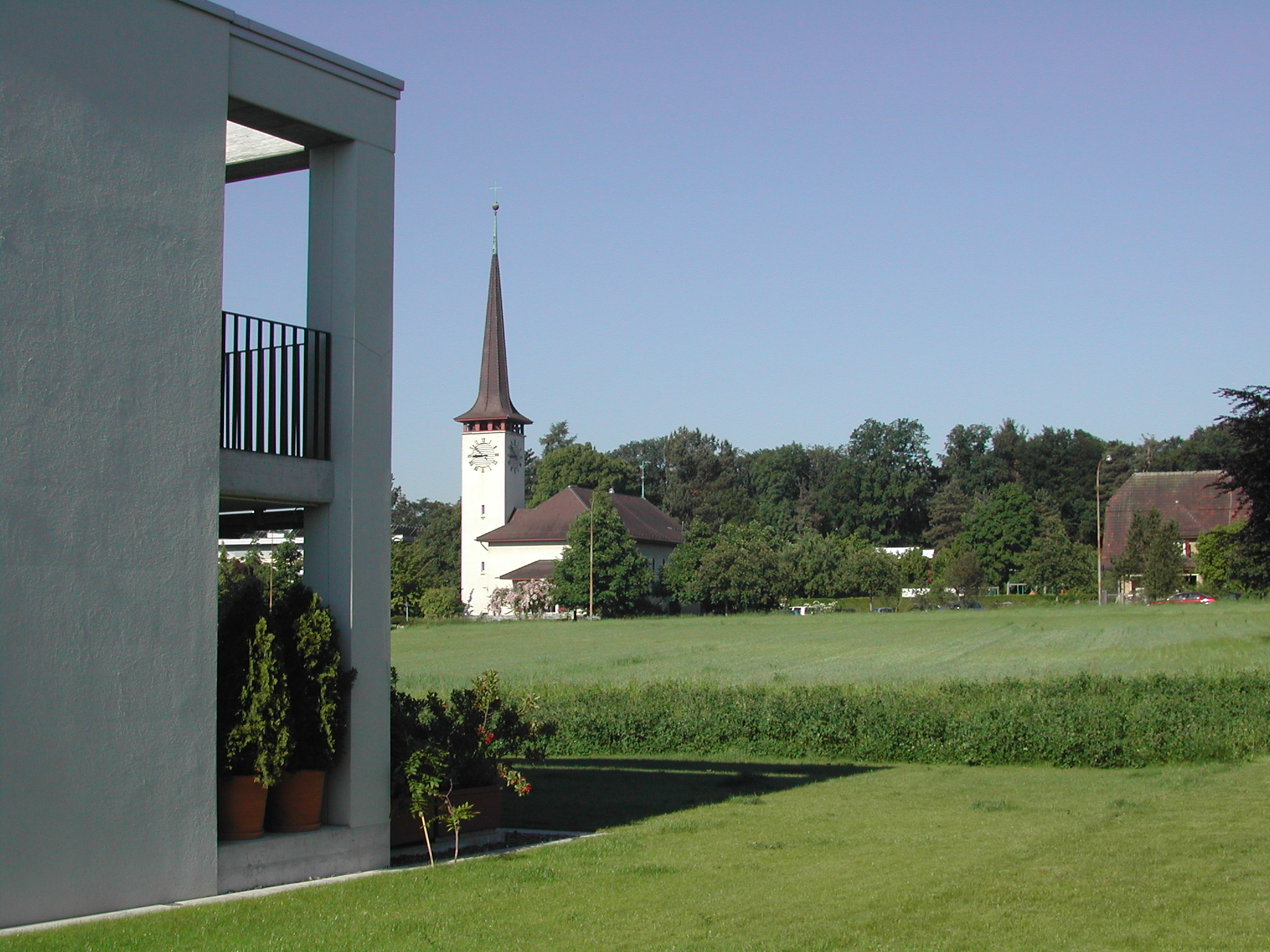

- Flag Coat of arms
- Location of Zollikofen
- Location within Switzerland Location within Canton of Bern
- Coordinates: 47°00′N 7°27′E
- Country: Switzerland
- Canton: Bern
- District: Bern-Mittelland

Government
  - Executive: Gemeinderat with 7 members
  - Mayor: Gemeindepräsident(in); Daniel Bichsel SVP/UDC (as of 2025)
  - Parliament: Grosser Gemeinderat with 40 members

Area
  - Total: 5.39 km^{2} (2.08 sq mi)
- Elevation: 557 m (1,827 ft)

Population (December 2020)
  - Total: 10,640
  - Density: 1,970/km^{2} (5,110/sq mi)
- Time zone: UTC+01:00 (CET)
  - Summer (DST): UTC+02:00 (CEST)
- Postal code: 3052
- SFOS number: 361
- ISO 3166 code: CH-BE
- Surrounded by: Bern, Bremgarten bei Bern, Ittigen, Kirchlindach, Münchenbuchsee
- Twin towns: Neudörfl, Burgenland (Austria)
- Website: www.zollikofen.ch

Zollikofen is a municipality in the Bern-Mittelland administrative district of the Canton of Bern in Switzerland. It is a suburb of the city of Bern and is home to the Swiss College of Agriculture (SHL).

== Geography ==
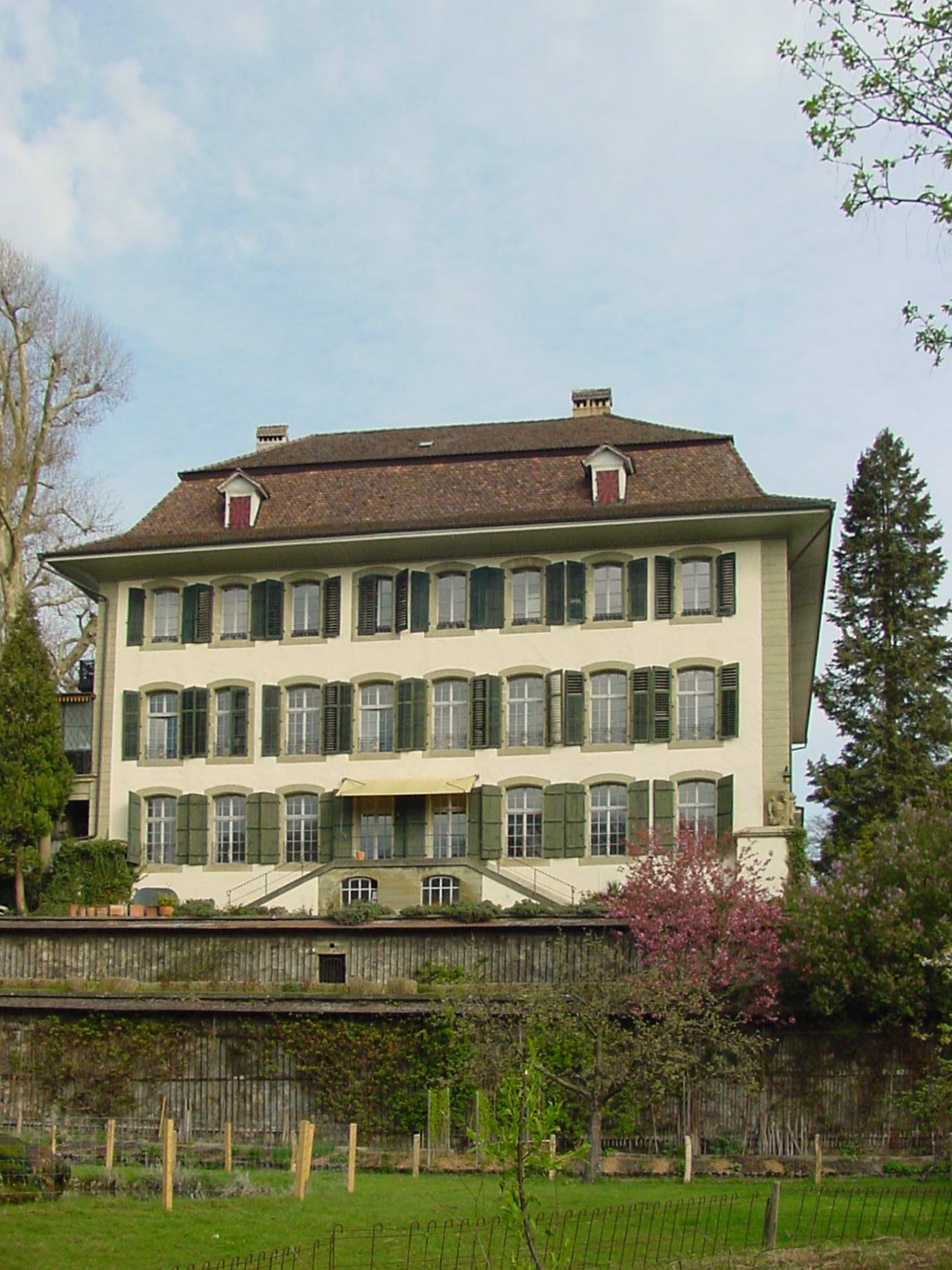
Reichenbach Castle in Zollikofen

Aerial view by Walter Mittelholzer (1937)

Zollikofen has an area of 5.39 km^{2} (2.08 sq mi). Of this area, 2.39 km^{2} (0.92 mi^{2}) or 44.3% is used for agricultural purposes, while 0.68 km^{2} (0.26 mi^{2}) or 12.6% is forested. Of the rest of the land, 2.27 km^{2} (0.88 mi^{2}) or 42.1% is settled (buildings or roads), 0.07 km^{2} (17 acres) or 1.3% is either rivers or lakes.

Of the developed area, industrial buildings made up 4.1% of the total area while housing and buildings made up 27.1% and transportation infrastructure made up 8.0%. while parks, green belts and sports fields made up 2.2%. Out of the forested land, 11.3% of the total land area is heavily forested and 1.3% is covered with orchards or small clusters of trees. Of the agricultural land, 33.2% is used for growing crops and 10.4% is pastures. All the water in the municipality is flowing water.

On 31 December 2009 Amtsbezirk Bern, the municipality's former district, was dissolved. On the following day, 1 January 2010, it joined the newly created Verwaltungskreis Bern-Mittelland.

== Coat of arms ==
The blazon of the municipal coat of arms is Per fess Argent two Lions rampant combatant the dexter Gules maned Or and the sinister Sable crowned and collared Or langued and viriled Gules each holding a Tanner Knife Azure handled Or and Gules on a Bend Argent nine Box Leaves Vert.

== Demographics ==
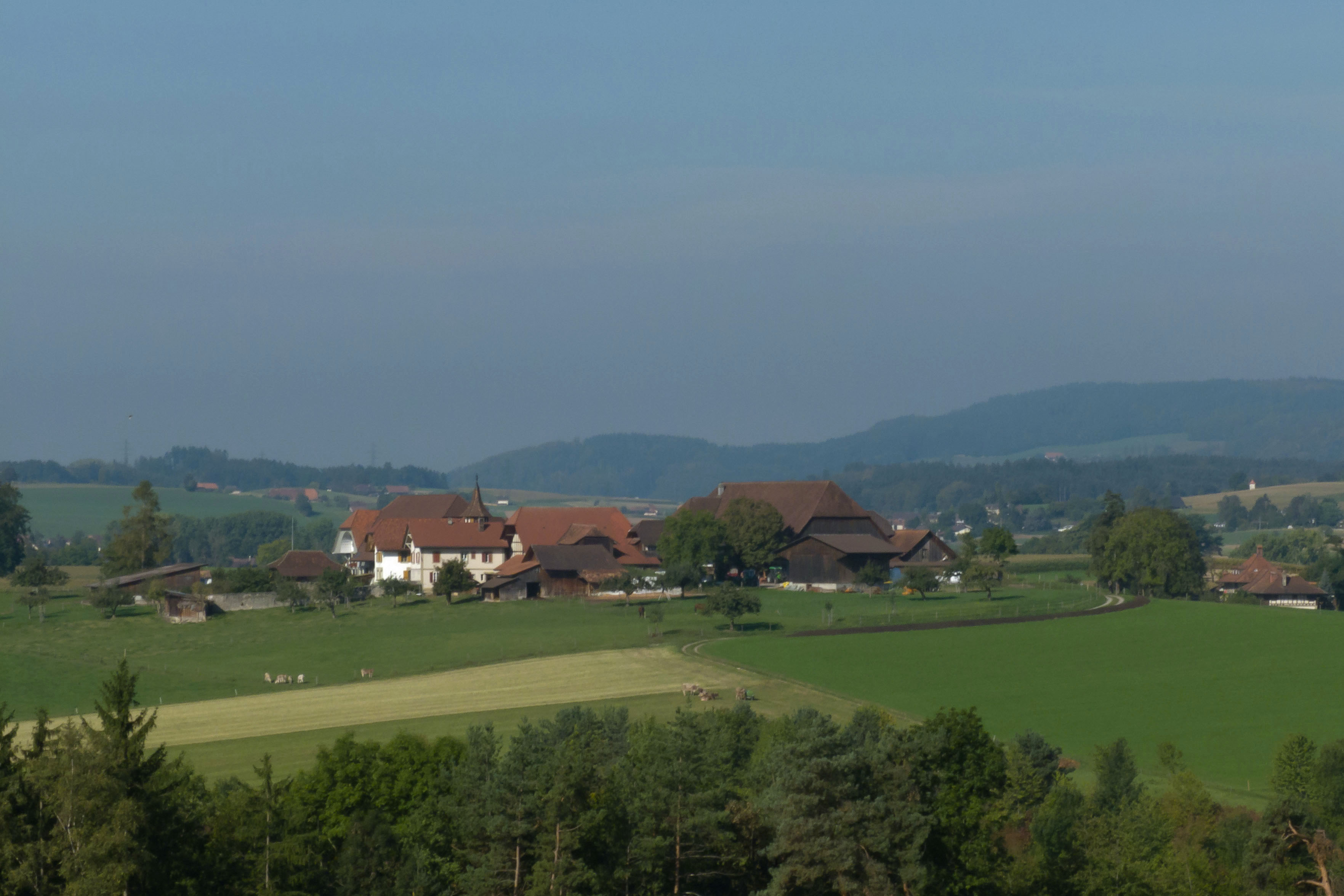
Bühlikofen hamlet

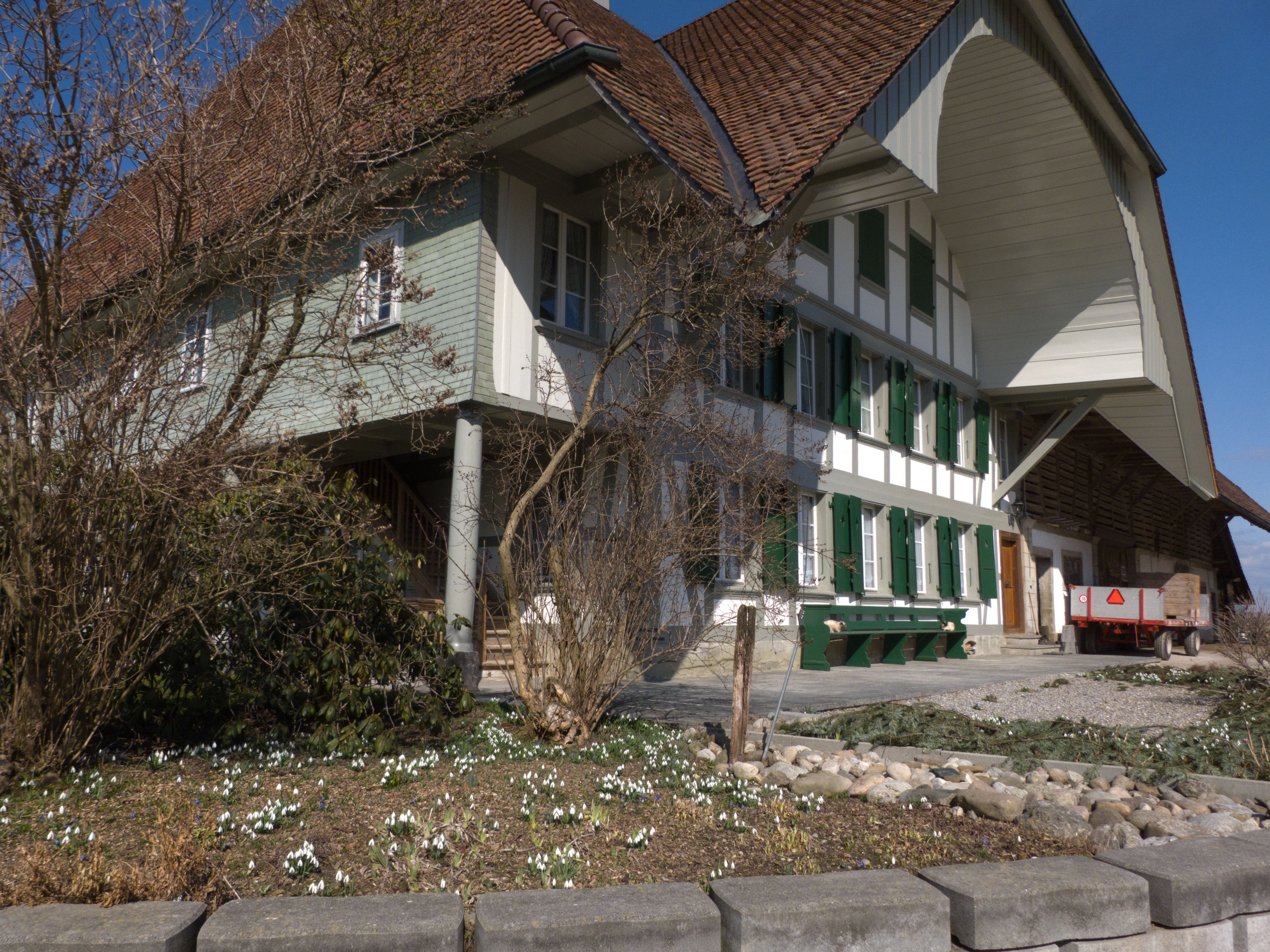
Farm house in Bühlikofen

Zollikofen has a population (as of December 2020) of 10,640. As of 2010, 18.4% of the population are resident foreign nationals. Over the last 10 years (2000–2010) the population has changed at a rate of 6.1%. Migration accounted for 5.6%, while births and deaths accounted for 2.1%.

Most of the population (as of 2000) speaks German (8,173 or 86.6%) as their first language, Italian is the second most common (266 or 2.8%) and French is the third (230 or 2.4%). There are 13 people who speak Romansh.

As of 2008, the population was 48.6% male and 51.4% female. The population was made up of 3,820 Swiss men (38.9% of the population) and 956 (9.7%) non-Swiss men. There were 4,203 Swiss women (42.8%) and 852 (8.7%) non-Swiss women. Of the population in the municipality, 1,646 or about 17.4% were born in Zollikofen and lived there in 2000. There were 3,892 or 41.2% who were born in the same canton, while 1,909 or 20.2% were born somewhere else in Switzerland, and 1,567 or 16.6% were born outside of Switzerland.

As of 2010, children and teenagers (0–19 years old) make up 19.1% of the population, while adults (20–64 years old) make up 60.4% and seniors (over 64 years old) make up 20.5%.

As of 2000, there were 3,784 people who were single and never married in the municipality. There were 4,558 married individuals, 561 widows or widowers and 534 individuals who are divorced.

As of 2000, there were 1,501 households that consist of only one person and 162 households with five or more people. In 2000, a total of 4,066 apartments (93.1% of the total) were permanently occupied, while 194 apartments (4.4%) were seasonally occupied and 106 apartments (2.4%) were empty. As of 2010, the construction rate of new housing units was 0.3 new units per 1000 residents. The vacancy rate for the municipality, in 2011, was 1.25%.

The historical population is given in the following chart:

== Heritage sites of national significance ==
The Archiv Schweizer Milchproduzenten, (Archive of Swiss Milk Production) and Reichenbach Castle are listed as Swiss heritage site of national significance. The hamlet of Büelikofen / Graben is part of the Inventory of Swiss Heritage Sites.

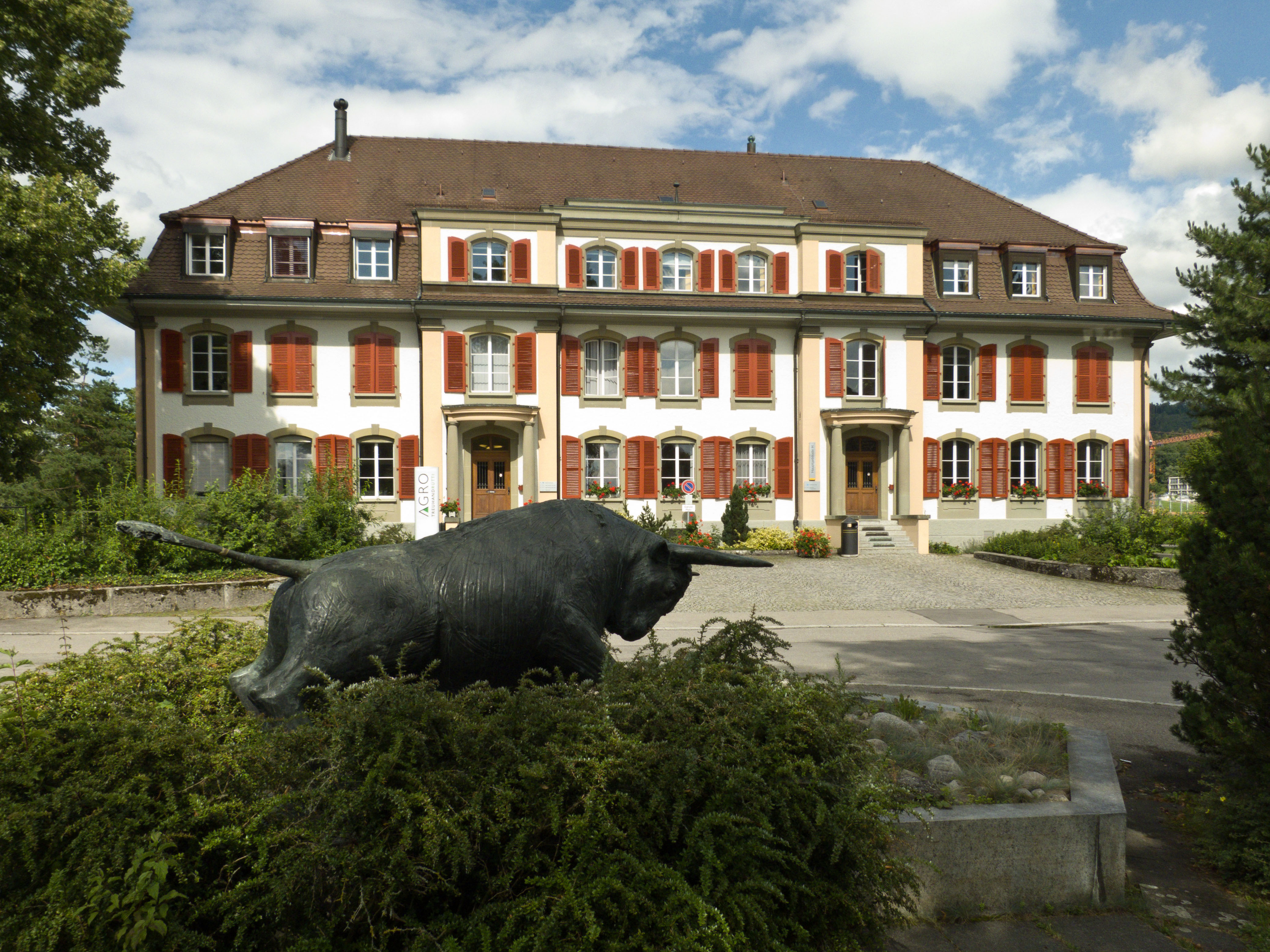
Archiv Schweizer Milchproduzenten

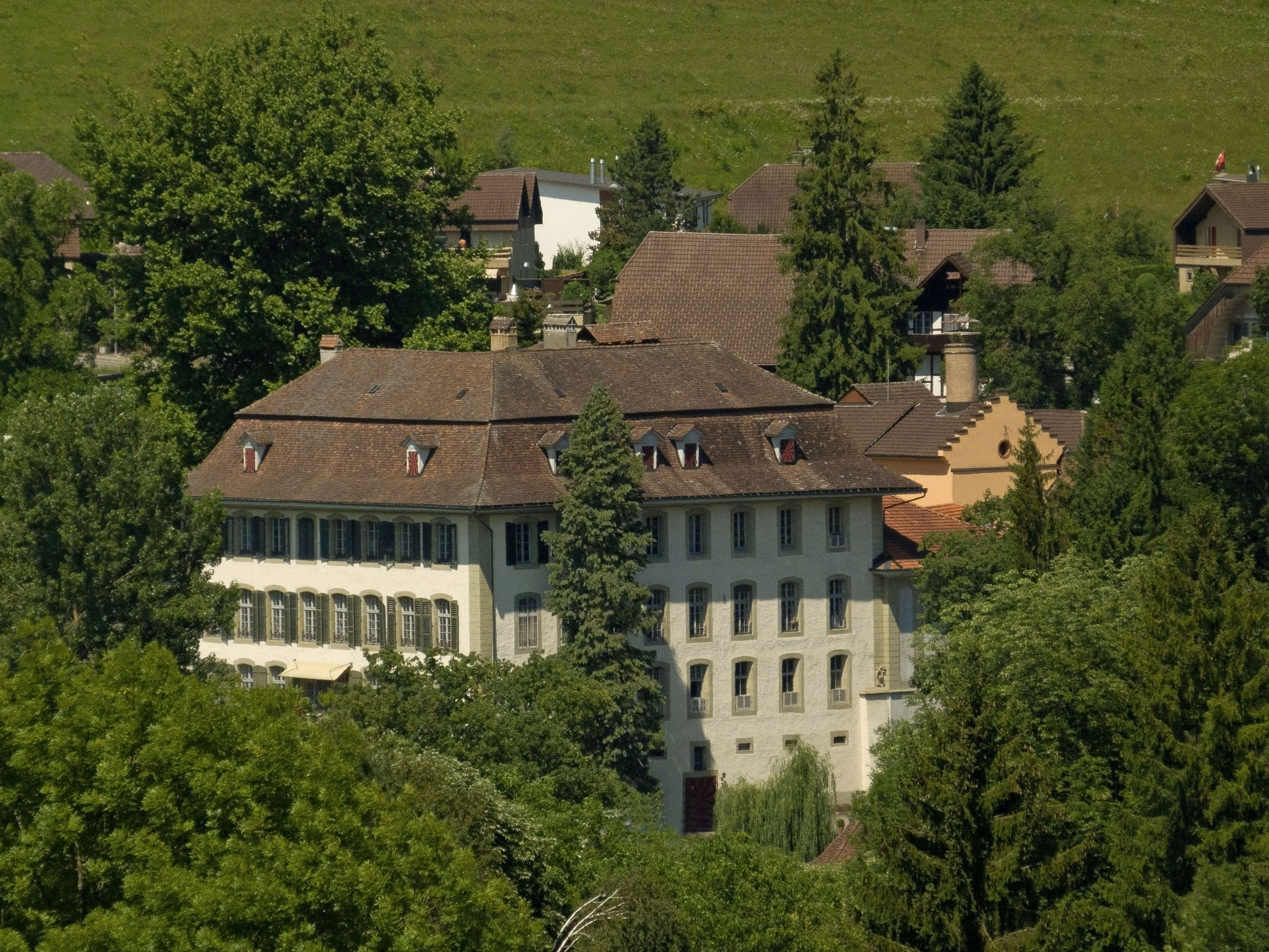
Reichenbach Castle

== Main sights ==
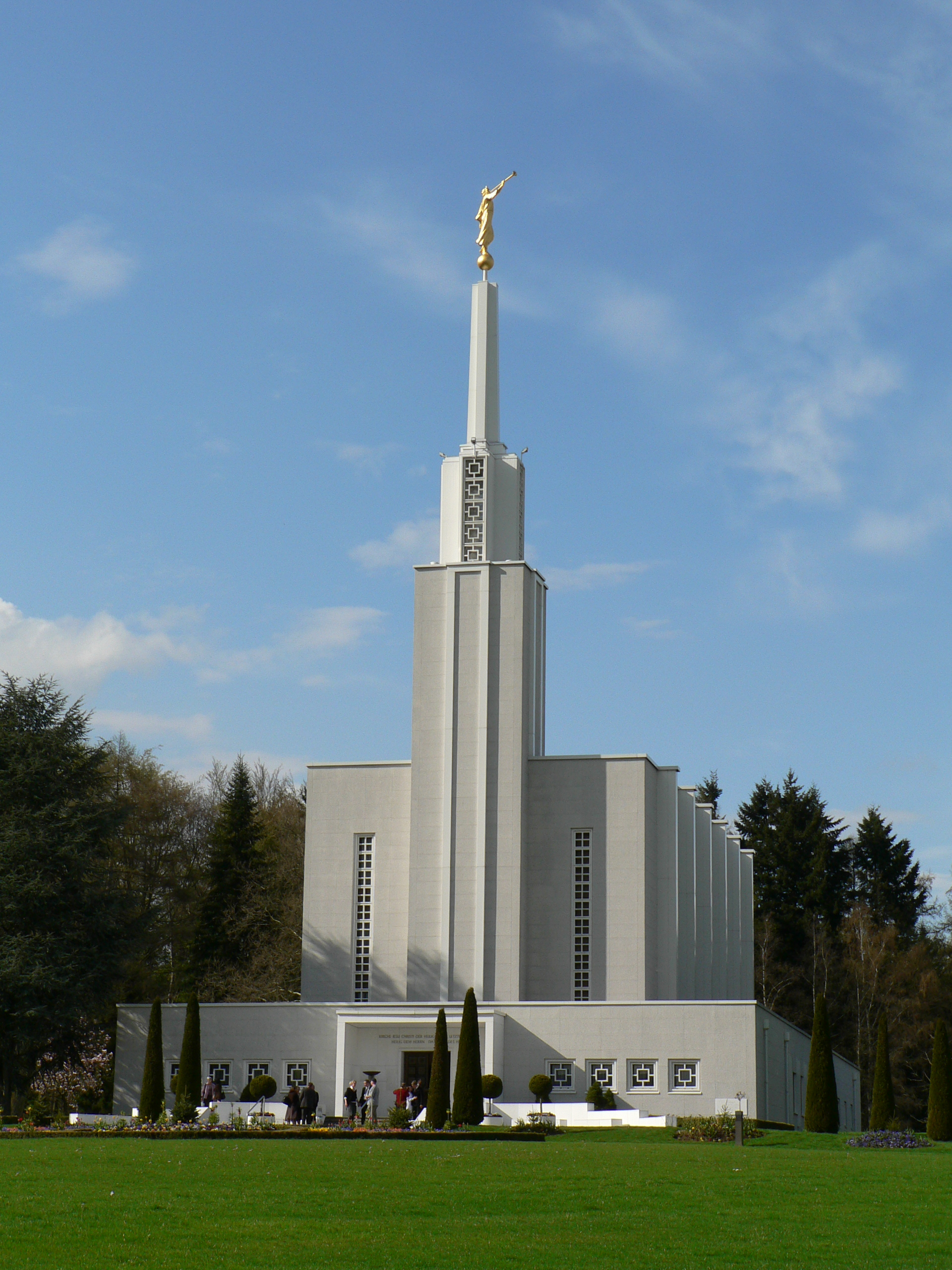
The LDS temple near Zollikofen

The Bern Switzerland Temple (formerly the Swiss Temple) a temple of the Church of Jesus Christ of Latter-day Saints (sometimes called the LDS Church). Though the building is located in Münchenbuchsee, its postal address is assigned to Zollikofen. It was the first LDS temple to be built in Europe and the first to be built outside of the United States and Canada. The temple was dedicated on September 11, 1955, by President David O. McKay. In 1992 it was rededicated by President Gordon B. Hinckley. The temple grounds are open to visitors, but only members of the Church in good standing may enter the temple.

== Politics ==
In the 2011 federal election the most popular party was the SVP which received 23.2% of the vote. The next three most popular parties were the SPS (20.1%), the BDP Party (15.3%) and the FDP (11.8%). In the federal election, a total of 3,809 votes were cast, and the voter turnout was 55.9%.

== Economy ==
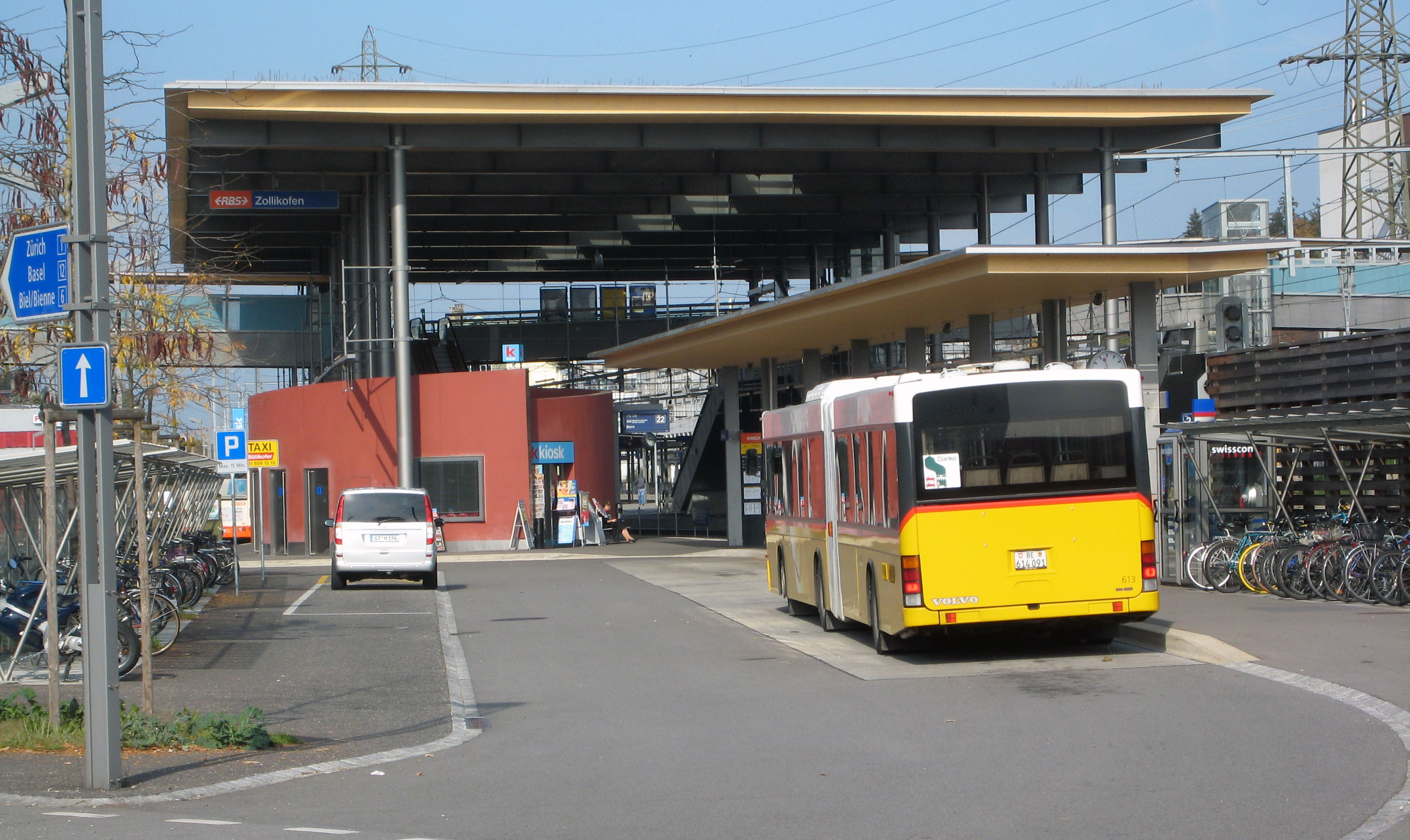
Zollikofen train station

As of 2011, Zollikofen had an unemployment rate of 3.17%. As of 2008, there were a total of 4,776 people employed in the municipality. Of these, there were 145 people employed in the primary economic sector and about 16 businesses involved in this sector. 1,211 people were employed in the secondary sector and there were 75 businesses in this sector. 3,420 people were employed in the tertiary sector, with 261 businesses in this sector.

In 2008 there were a total of 4,019 full-time equivalent jobs. The number of jobs in the primary sector was 116, all of which were in agriculture. The number of jobs in the secondary sector was 1,137 of which 814 or (71.6%) were in manufacturing and 298 (26.2%) were in construction. The number of jobs in the tertiary sector was 2,766. In the tertiary sector; 601 or 21.7% were in wholesale or retail sales or the repair of motor vehicles, 148 or 5.4% were in the movement and storage of goods, 85 or 3.1% were in a hotel or restaurant, 70 or 2.5% were in the information industry, 194 or 7.0% were the insurance or financial industry, 311 or 11.2% were technical professionals or scientists, 218 or 7.9% were in education and 615 or 22.2% were in health care.

In 2000, there were 4,032 workers who commuted into the municipality and 3,653 workers who commuted away. The municipality is a net importer of workers, with about 1.1 workers entering the municipality for every one leaving. Of the working population, 40.8% used public transportation to get to work, and 36.8% used a private car.

== Religion ==
From the 2000 census, 1,892 or 20.0% were Roman Catholic, while 5,395 or 57.2% belonged to the Swiss Reformed Church. Of the rest of the population, there were 154 members of an Orthodox church (or about 1.63% of the population), there were 8 individuals (or about 0.08% of the population) who belonged to the Christian Catholic Church, and there were 560 individuals (or about 5.93% of the population) who belonged to another Christian church. There were 6 individuals (or about 0.06% of the population) who were Jewish, and 414 (or about 4.39% of the population) who were Islamic. There were 67 individuals who were Buddhist, 66 individuals who were Hindu and 3 individuals who belonged to another church. 826 (or about 8.75% of the population) belonged to no church, are agnostic or atheist, and 321 individuals (or about 3.40% of the population) did not answer the question.

== Education ==
In Zollikofen about 3,906 or (41.4%) of the population have completed non-mandatory upper secondary education, and 1,508 or (16.0%) have completed additional higher education (either university or a Fachhochschule). Of the 1,508 who completed tertiary schooling, 67.6% were Swiss men, 23.8% were Swiss women, 5.3% were non-Swiss men and 3.3% were non-Swiss women.

The Canton of Bern school system provides one year of non-obligatory Kindergarten, followed by six years of Primary school. This is followed by three years of obligatory lower Secondary school where the students are separated according to ability and aptitude. Following the lower Secondary students may attend additional schooling or they may enter an apprenticeship.

During the 2009–10 school year, there were a total of 1,081 students attending classes in Zollikofen. There were 9 kindergarten classes with a total of 186 students in the municipality. Of the kindergarten students, 33.3% were permanent or temporary residents of Switzerland (not citizens) and 41.9% have a different mother language than the classroom language. The municipality had 28 primary classes and 538 students. Of the primary students, 32.0% were permanent or temporary residents of Switzerland (not citizens) and 44.6% have a different mother language than the classroom language. During the same year, there were 13 lower secondary classes with a total of 217 students. There were 30.9% who were permanent or temporary residents of Switzerland (not citizens) and 36.4% have a different mother language than the classroom language.

As of 2000, there were 166 students in Zollikofen who came from another municipality, while 312 residents attended schools outside the municipality.

Zollikofen is home to the BFH Schweizerische Hochschule für Landwirtschaft SHL library. The library has (as of 2008) 8,058 books or other media, and loaned out 3,231 items in the same year. It was open a total of 200 days with average of 42 hours per week during that year.

== Transportation ==
The municipality has four railway stations: Zollikofen, Oberzollikofen, Unterzollikofen, and Steinibach. The latter two are located on the narrow-gauge Zollikofen–Bern line, which terminates in the centre of Zollikofen. Zollikofen and Oberzollikofen are located on the narrow-gauge Solothurn–Worblaufen line, and Zollikofen also has standard-gauge mainline connections to Biel/Bienne and Thun.

== Weather ==
Climate data for Bern/Zollikofen
Month	Jan	Feb	Mar	Apr	May	Jun	Jul	Aug	Sep	Oct	Nov	Dec	Year
Mean daily maximum °C (°F)	2.2 (36.0)	4.6 (40.3)	8.5 (47.3)	12.6 (54.7)	17.2 (63.0)	20.6 (69.1)	23.5 (74.3)	22.7 (72.9)	19.4 (66.9)	13.7 (56.7)	7.1 (44.8)	3 (37)	12.9 (55.2)
Daily mean °C (°F)	−1.2 (29.8)	0.5 (32.9)	3.7 (38.7)	7.3 (45.1)	11.5 (52.7)	14.9 (58.8)	17.3 (63.1)	16.4 (61.5)	13.3 (55.9)	8.6 (47.5)	3.1 (37.6)	−0.3 (31.5)	7.9 (46.2)
Mean daily minimum °C (°F)	−3.7 (25.3)	−2.4 (27.7)	−0.1 (31.8)	3 (37)	6.9 (44.4)	10.1 (50.2)	12.1 (53.8)	11.7 (53.1)	9 (48)	5.3 (41.5)	0.5 (32.9)	−2.6 (27.3)	4.2 (39.6)
Average precipitation mm (inches)	66 (2.6)	58 (2.3)	70 (2.8)	84 (3.3)	108 (4.3)	121 (4.8)	104 (4.1)	113 (4.4)	84 (3.3)	73 (2.9)	81 (3.2)	67 (2.6)	1,028 (40.5)
Average precipitation days	10	9.8	11.3	11.6	13.7	11.8	10	10.9	8.1	8	10.1	10.2	125.5
Source: MeteoSchweiz

== Notable people ==
- Serge Brignoni (1903–2002) avant-garde painter and sculptor
- Katharina Perch-Nielsen (born 1940) a Swiss geologist and orienteering competitor, brought up in Zollikofen
- Corinne Schmidhauser (born 1964), ski racer and politician, competed at the 1988 Winter Olympics
- Thomas Laszlo Winkler (born 1985 in Zollikofen), former singer of the power metal band Gloryhammer, founder of Angus McSix
