= Worbboden railway station =

Railway station in Worb, Switzerland

Worbboden
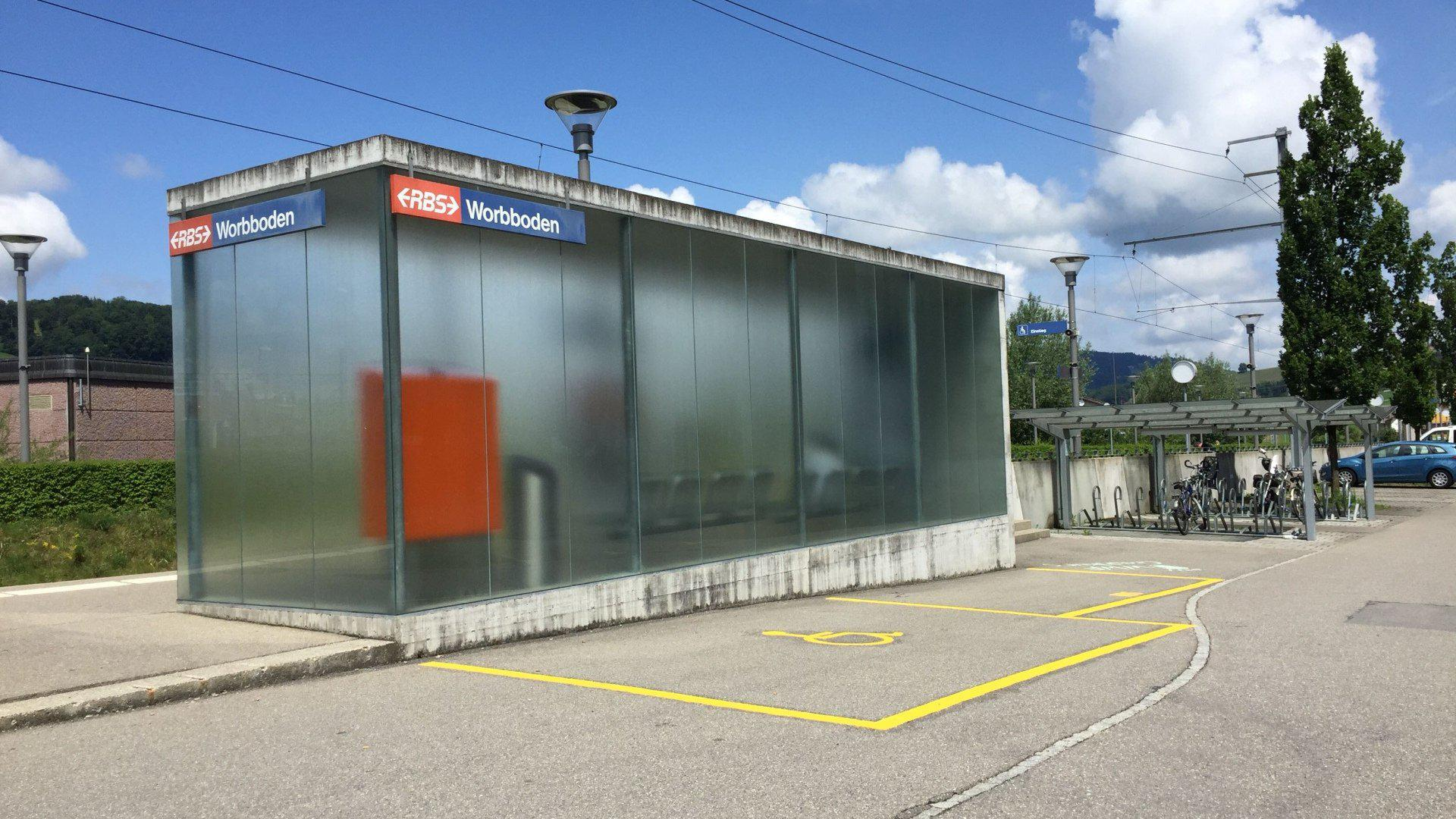
- The station platform in 2018

General information
- Location: Worb; Switzerland
- Coordinates: 46°56′02″N 7°33′36″E
- Elevation: 573 m (1,880 ft)
- Owner: Regionalverkehr Bern-Solothurn
- Line: Worb Dorf–Worblaufen line
- Platforms: 1 side platform
- Tracks: 1
- Train operators: Regionalverkehr Bern-Solothurn

Construction
- Accessible: Yes

Other information
- Station code: 8589198 (WOBO)
- Fare zone: 115 (Libero)

Services
Preceding station	Bern S-Bahn	Following station
Vechigen towards Bern	S7	Worb Dorf Terminus
Location

Worbboden railway station (German: Bahnhof Worbboden) is a railway station in the municipality of Worb, in the Swiss canton of Bern. It is an intermediate stop on the 1,000 mm (3 ft 3 3/8 in) gauge Worb Dorf–Worblaufen line of Regionalverkehr Bern-Solothurn.

== Services ==
The following services stop at Worbboden:

- Bern S-Bahn S7: service every fifteen minutes between Bern and Worb Dorf.
