= Hans Zulliger =

- Born: February 21, 1893; Mett, Switzerland
- Died: October 18, 1965 (aged 72); Ittigen, Switzerland
- Occupations: Teacher, child psychoanalyst and author

Hans Zulliger (February 21, 1893 in Mett/Mache, today part of Biel/Bienne, Canton of Bern – October 18, 1965 in Ittigen) was a Swiss teacher, child psychoanalyst and author.

== Life ==
From 1912 until 1959, Zulliger was a primary school teacher in Ittigen, Switzerland. He is remembered for his pioneer work of applying psychoanalytical practices into the education of school children, mostly from rural, working-class and under-privileged environments. He was introduced to modern psychiatric thought by educator Ernst Schneider (1878-1957) of the Bern-Hofwil Teachers' Academy. Zulliger enthusiastically studied the works of Sigmund Freud and Alfred Adler, subsequently becoming an analysand to Swiss theologian and lay psychoanalyst Oskar Pfister. Later on, Freud became interested in Zulliger's work, and visited him twice in Switzerland.

Zulliger had an intuitive understanding of children, as individuals, and also when they engaged in interactive group environments. He conducted research of children in regards to their difficulties at school, the games they played, and numerous other aspects of childhood. He published many articles on his personal reflections and observations of school children in the journal Zeitschrift für psychoanalytische Pädagogik ("Journal for psychoanalytic paedagogics"), of which he became a co-editor in 1932. In the years 1930 to 1935 he developed his Spieltherapie (Play therapy), which he designed to be deutungsfrei, free from interpretation. His understanding of the character and function of child's play and of the psychotherapy resulting from this were later lead down in his widely read book Heilende Kräfte im kindlichen Spiel (literally: Healing forces in children's play / vide Works section below).

After World War II, Zulliger's work contributed to the re-kindling of psychoanalytic instruction in Europe. Zulliger is credited with development of the "Tafeln-Z-Test", which is a modification of the better-known Rorschach test.

In addition to his books on child psychology, he was also a prolific author of books of juvenile fiction. Both types of books have been translated and published in altogether 13 foreign languages (apart from German), including English, Spanish, French and Italian.

== Play Therapy ==
His publisher describes Zulliger's radical approach thus (with quotes from the author and a book review):

Das frei erfundene Spiel ist die eigentliche "Sprache" des Kindes. Man muß sie erlernen, wenn man wirklich Zugang zur kindlichen Psyche erhalten, wenn man "erziehen" will. Diesen Zugang finden nur wenige. Zulliger ist sogar überzeugt, "dass wir unsere Jugend meist missverstehen oder überhaupt nicht verstehen, weil wir anders als sie denken und erfassen, und weil wir nicht wissen, wie sie denkt und erfasst".

Dem Verständnis dieser psychischen Schicht und der daraus entwickelten Psychotherapie widmet sich Zulliger. "Es geht in diesem Buch nicht um Spiel in einem harmlos vordergründigen Sinne, sondern um eine Bloßlegung der Kinderseele, die nicht nur Aufmerksamkeit, sondern schlechthin Erschütterung zulässt. Hans Zulliger erweist sich als einer der scharfsinnigsten Anthropologen der Gegenwart. Er handhabt sein Metier auf geradezu erregende Weise" (quoting a non-specified review by the Westdeutscher Rundfunk, the state-funded regional broadcasting company in Cologne) (from the 1972 edition of his book Heilende Kräfte im kindlichen Spiel, Fischer Taschenbuch Verlag, Frankfurt, opening pages).

(Freely invented play is the essential ""language" of the child. One must learn it [i.e. the "language"], if one wants to really gain access to the child's psyche, if one wants to "educate". This access only few manage to find. Zulliger is even convinced "that we mostly misunderstand our youth or even do not understand them at all, since we think and perceive in a different way from them, and since we do not know how they think and perceive.

It is the understanding of this psychic layer and of the psychotherapy developed from this that Zulliger devotes himself to. "The matter of this book is not play in a harmlessly superficial sense, but a laying-free of the child's soul, which allows not only attention, but absolutely shaking. Hans Zulliger proves himself as one of the most sharp-witted anthropologists of the present time. He handles his craft in an almost exciting way".)

== Works ==
- Psychoanalytische Erfahrungen aus der Volksschulpraxis. (1921)
- Aus dem unbewussten Seelenleben unserer Schuljugend. (1927)
- Heilende Kräfte im kindlichen Spiel. First edition 1952; 8th edition: Klotz Verlag (publisher), Eschborn 2007, ISBN 3-88074-4971 (in German).
- The Zolliger individual and group test. German original edition 1954. English edition: International University Press, New York 1969.
- Helfen statt strafen. (1956)
- Einführung in die Kinderseelenkunde. (1967)#

== Sources ==
- Friedrich Koch: Der Aufbruch der Paedagogik: Welten im Kopf - Bettelheim, Freinet, Geheeb, Korczak, Montessori, Neill, Petersen, Zulliger. Rotbuch Verlag, Hamburg 2000, ISBN 3-434-53026-6 (in German).
- Danielle Milhaud-Cappe: Freud et le mouvement de pédagogie psychoanalytique 1908-1937: A. Aichhorn, H. Zulliger, O. Pfister. Librairie Philosophique Virin, Paris 2007, ISBN 978-2-7116-1900-9 (in French).
