= Oberzollikofen railway station =

Railway station in Zollikofen, Switzerland

Oberzollikofen
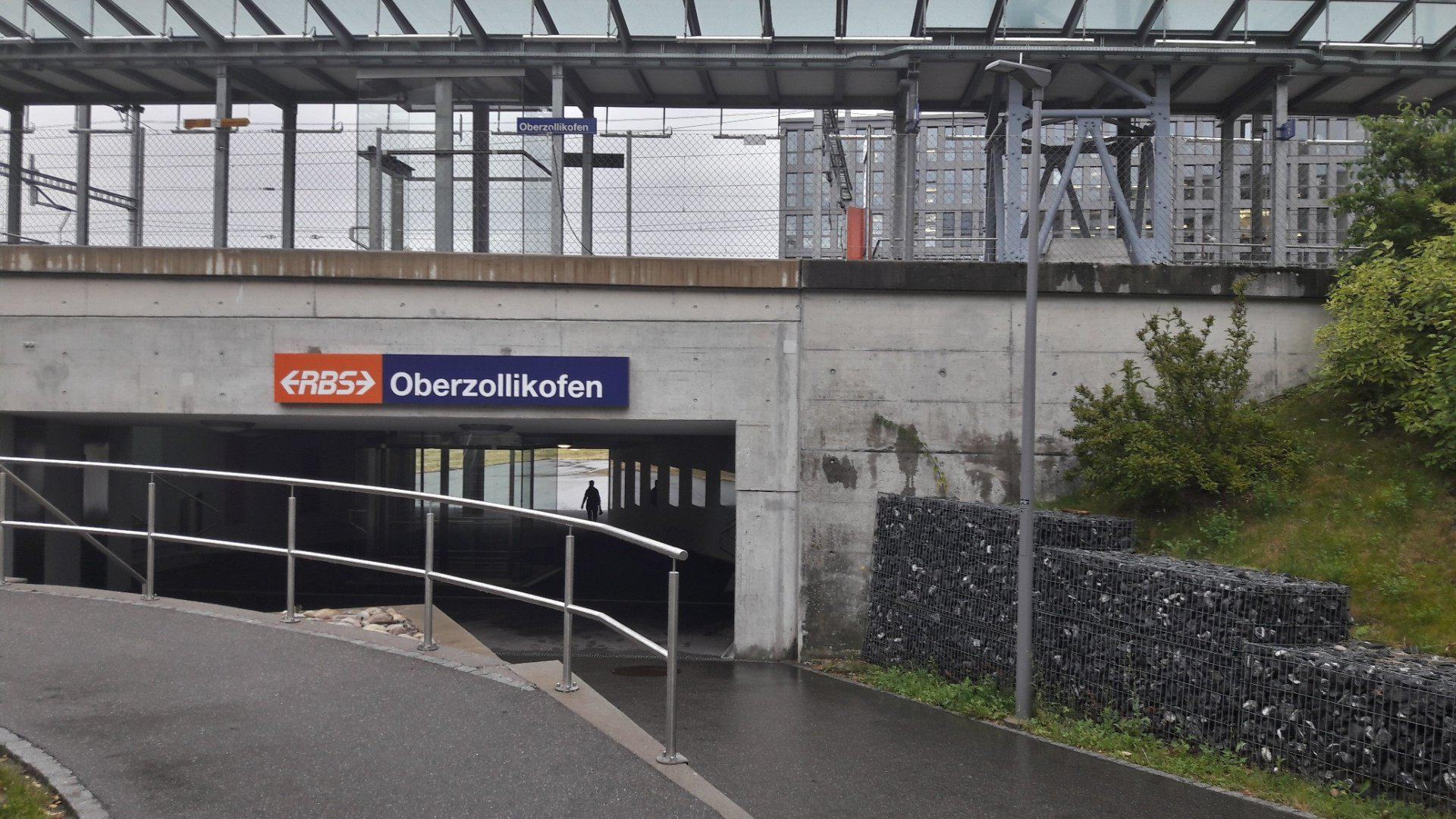
- The station in 2018

General information
- Location: Zollikofen; Switzerland
- Coordinates: 46°59′49″N 7°27′43″E
- Elevation: 558 m (1,831 ft)
- Owner: Regionalverkehr Bern-Solothurn
- Line: Solothurn–Worblaufen line
- Distance: 27.4 km (17.0 mi) from Solothurn
- Platforms: 2 (1 island platform)
- Tracks: 2
- Train operators: Regionalverkehr Bern-Solothurn
- Connections: RBS bus line

Construction
- Accessible: Yes

Other information
- Station code: 8508070 (OBZO)
- Fare zone: 101 (Libero)

Services
Preceding station	Bern S-Bahn	Following station
Worblaufen towards Bern	S8	Zollikofen towards Jegenstorf or Bätterkinden
Location

Oberzollikofen railway station (German: Bahnhof Oberzollikofen) is a railway station in the municipality of Zollikofen, in the Swiss canton of Bern. It is an intermediate stop on the 1,000 mm (3 ft 3 3/8 in) gauge Solothurn–Worblaufen line of Regionalverkehr Bern-Solothurn.

== Services ==
The following services stop at Oberzollikofen:

- Bern S-Bahn S8: service every fifteen minutes between Bern and Jegenstorf, half-hourly service from Jegenstorf to Bätterkinden.
