= Jürg M. Stauffer =

Swiss politician (born 1977)

Jürg M. Stauffer (born September 11, 1977) is a Swiss politician from Ittigen in the canton of Bern. From 2000 until November 26, 2004, he was Secretary General of the Young SVP, the youth section of the Swiss People's Party (SVP). He quit this office after irregularities surrounding the financing of a party event were made public. On May 17, 2008, Stauffer was elected vice Secretary General of the JSVP.

Stauffer represents the Young SVP in various international organizations such the International Young Democrat Union (IYDU); in 2006 he was a vice-chairman of IYDU.
