= Bolligen railway station =

Railway station in Bolligen, Switzerland

Bolligen
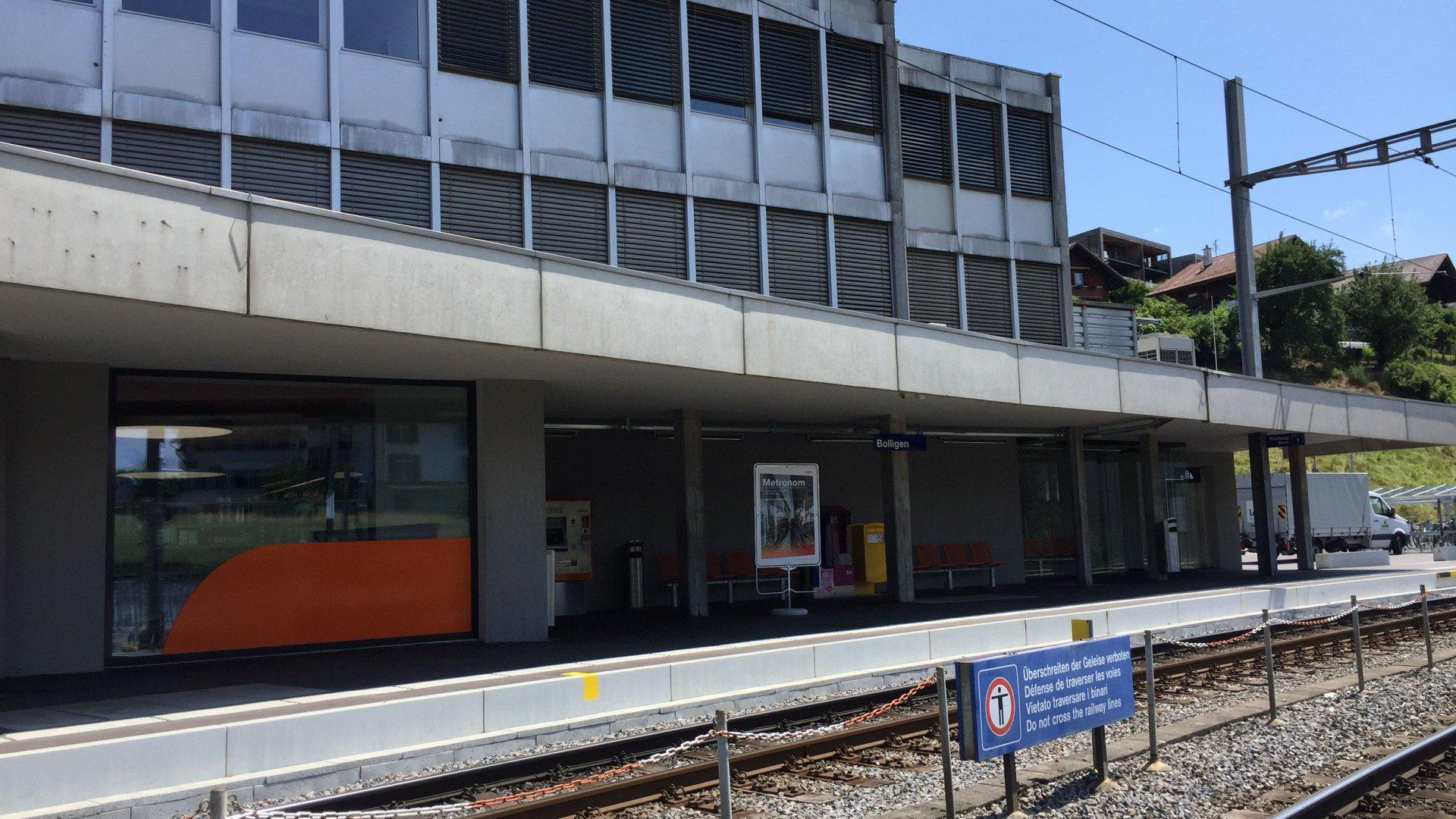
- The station in 2018

General information
- Location: Bolligen; Switzerland
- Coordinates: 46°58′12″N 7°29′49″E
- Elevation: 543 m (1,781 ft)
- Owner: Regionalverkehr Bern-Solothurn
- Line: Worb Dorf–Worblaufen line
- Platforms: 2 side platforms
- Tracks: 2
- Train operators: Regionalverkehr Bern-Solothurn
- Connections: RBS buses; PostAuto AG bus line

Construction
- Accessible: Yes

Other information
- Station code: 8507068 (BOLI)
- Fare zone: 101 (Libero)

Services
Preceding station	Bern S-Bahn	Following station
Ittigen bei Bern towards Bern	S7	Deisswil towards Worb Dorf
Ittigen bei Bern towards Bern	S7 Rush-hour service	Terminus
Location

Bolligen railway station (German: Bahnhof Bolligen) is a railway station in the municipality of Bolligen, in the Swiss canton of Bern. It is an intermediate stop on the 1,000 mm (3 ft 3 3/8 in) gauge Worb Dorf–Worblaufen line of Regionalverkehr Bern-Solothurn.

== Services ==
The following services stop at Bolligen:

- Bern S-Bahn:
  - S7: service every fifteen minutes between Bern and Worb Dorf.
  - Rush-hour service every fifteen minutes to Bern.
