= Unterzollikofen railway station =

Railway station in Zollikofen, Switzerland

Unterzollikofen
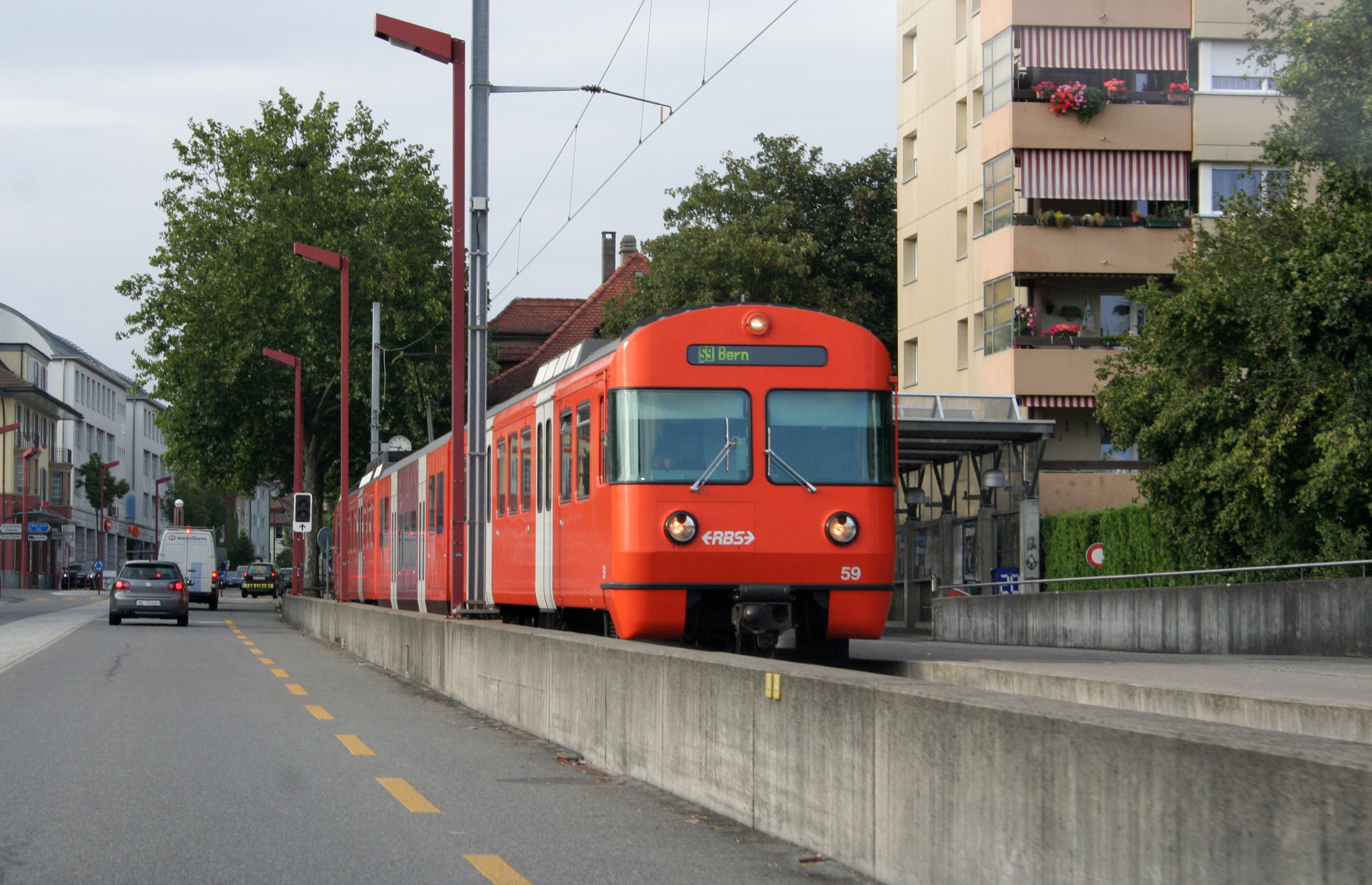
- RBS train at the station in 2007

General information
- Location: Zollikofen; Switzerland
- Coordinates: 46°59′31″N 7°27′25″E
- Elevation: 544 m (1,785 ft)
- Owner: Regionalverkehr Bern-Solothurn
- Line: Zollikofen–Bern line
- Platforms: 1 side platform
- Tracks: 1
- Train operators: Regionalverkehr Bern-Solothurn
- Connections: Autobusbetrieb RBS buses

Construction
- Accessible: Yes

Other information
- Station code: 8508055 (UNZO)
- Fare zone: 101 (Libero)

Services
Preceding station	Bern S-Bahn	Following station
Steinibach towards Bern	S9	Terminus
Location

Unterzollikofen railway station (German: Bahnhof Unterzollikofen) is a railway station in the municipality of Zollikofen, in the Swiss canton of Bern. It is the northern terminus of the 1,000 mm (3 ft 3 3/8 in) gauge Zollikofen–Bern line of Regionalverkehr Bern-Solothurn.

== Services ==
The following services stop at Unterzollikofen:

- Bern S-Bahn S9: service every fifteen minutes to Bern.
