= Ittigen =

Municipality in Bern, Switzerland

- Municipality
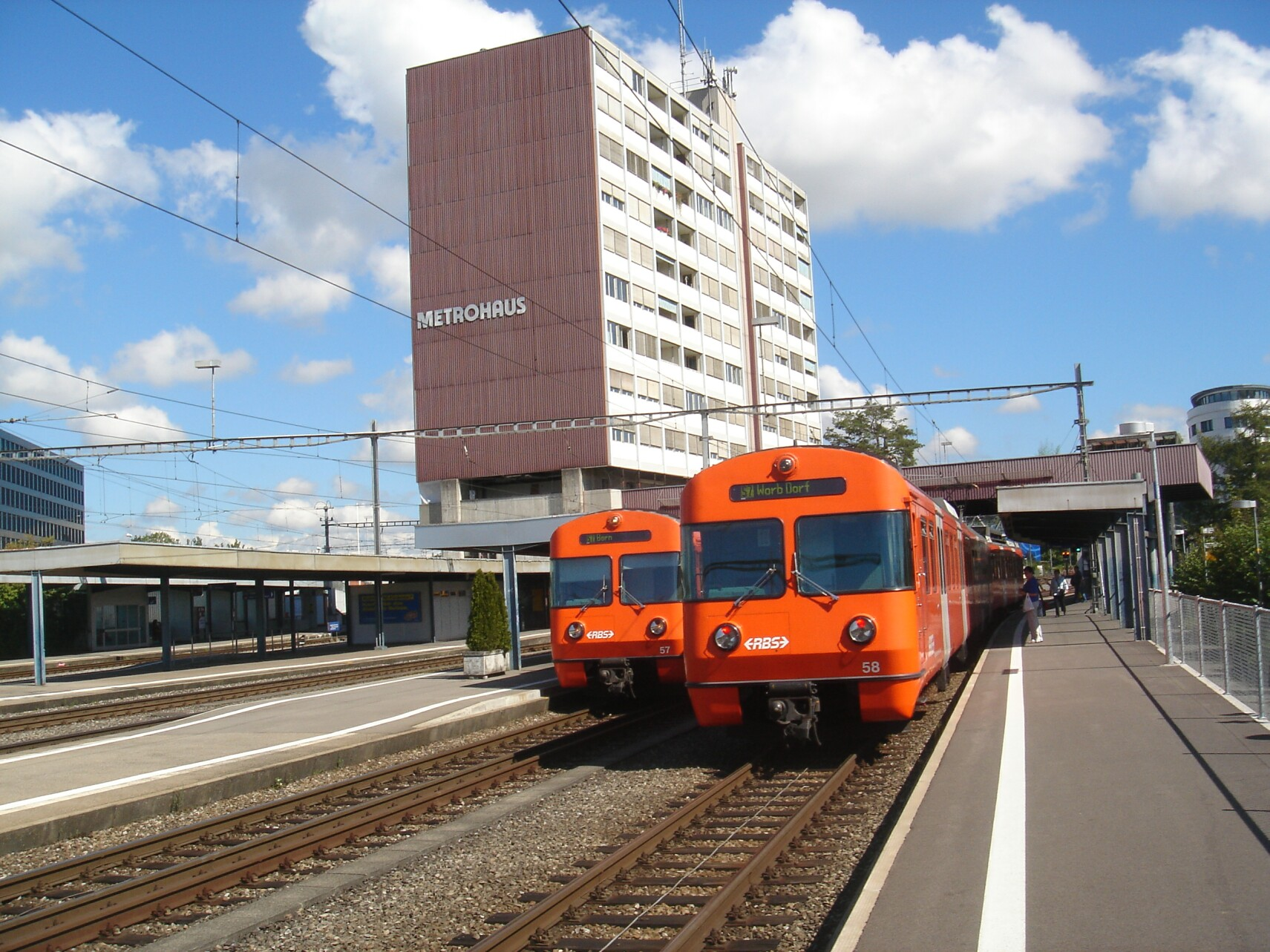

- Flag Coat of arms
- Location of Ittigen
- Location within Switzerland Location within Canton of Bern
- Coordinates: 46°59′N 7°29′E
- Country: Switzerland
- Canton: Bern
- District: Bern-Mittelland

Government
  - Executive: Gemeinderat with 7 members
  - Mayor: Gemeindepräsident; Thomas Stauffer BVI (as of 2026)

Area
  - Total: 4.20 km^{2} (1.62 sq mi)
- Elevation: 526 m (1,726 ft)

Population (December 2020)
  - Total: 11,430
  - Density: 2,720/km^{2} (7,050/sq mi)
- Time zone: UTC+01:00 (CET)
  - Summer (DST): UTC+02:00 (CEST)
- Postal code: 3063
- SFOS number: 362
- ISO 3166 code: CH-BE
- Localities: Ittigen, Kappelisacker, Papiermühle, Worblaufen
- Surrounded by: Bern, Bolligen, Moosseedorf, Münchenbuchsee, Ostermundigen, Zollikofen
- Twin towns: Dobrush (Belarus)
- Website: ittigen.ch

Ittigen is a municipality in the Bern-Mittelland administrative district in the canton of Bern in Switzerland.

The municipality was formed in 1983 when it and Ostermundigen were separated from territory once part of Bolligen.

== History ==
Its placename is derived from the Alemannic German "at the people of the Ito", and first appeared in print in 1318 as Yttigen. In 1326 it was mentioned as villa de Ittigen.

Traces of prehistoric settlements have been found at Worblaufen (La Tene vessel with cremated remains, Roman coins and Early Medieval graves), in the Papiermühle neighborhood (5th or 6th century Early Medieval cemetery with about 30 graves), Neuhaus (Early Medieval graves) and in Wydacker (Seax).

While the small hamlets of Papiermühle, Schermen, Neuhaus, Badhaus developed on the valley floor, the farming villages of Ittigen and Worblaufen grew up on terraces in the low mountains above the valley. The two farming villages took advantage of extensive arable land for individual fields and shared common farm land and common forests. A number of scattered small farms grew up around the two villages and also had a share of the common land. While the villages in the mountains remained mostly agricultural, the hamlets on the valley floor were local centers for trade and industry. A paper mill (German: Papiermühle) opened in Papiermühle in 1466, followed by a toll house and an inn. There was also a mill at Schermen, a toll house and inn in Neuhaus and a 15th-century spa and inn in Badhaus. A paper mill and several hammer mills eventually opened in Worblaufen. Around the 17th and 18th centuries, the agricultural villages focused on providing fruits, vegetables and hay for the weekly markets in the nearby city of Bern. The area's sunny weather and proximity to Bern encouraged several wealthy families to build country estates in Ittigen including Mannenberg in Ittigen village and Sandhof and Lindenhof in Worblaufen. In the 19th century, agriculture remained important, but small workshops and cottage industry work provided jobs for many of the residents. A pasta factory opened in Schermen in 1831 followed by a chocolate factory in 1917.

Until 1983, Ittigen was part of Bolligen. Within the Bolligen parish, Ittigen and the surrounding villages formed a semi-independent congregation and elected their own member of the church council. The congregation fulfilled many of the essential municipal functions such as caring for the poor and orphans, providing education and collecting taxes. However, it remained subject to the municipality of Bolligen. In 1774 Ittigen attempted, unsuccessfully, to get their own coat of arms. In 1813 the village school was founded though it opened five years later in 1818. With the school the village finally got a measure of independence. In 1834 it became one of the four quarters within the municipality of Bolligen (the other three were Bolligen, Ferenberg and Ostermundigen). The quarters were responsible for the fire department, maintaining roads and primary education while the municipality handled finances, taxation and secondary education. Throughout the 20th century the municipality voted on whether they should be incorporated into Bern (1913, 1919), centralize all municipal functions (1930, 1945 and 1963) or split into separate municipalities (1956, 1962 and 1972). Finally in 1978 the residents voted to divide into independent municipalities and between 1980 and 1983 the new municipality took over functions from Bolligen.

== Geography ==
Ittigen has an area of 4.2 km^{2} (1.62 sq mi). Of this area, 1.03 km^{2} (0.40 mi^{2}) or 24.5% is used for agricultural purposes, while 0.6 km^{2} (0.23 mi^{2}) or 14.3% is forested. Of the rest of the land, 2.54 km^{2} (0.98 mi^{2}) or 60.3% is settled (buildings or roads), 0.04 km^{2} (9.9 acres) or 1.0% is either rivers or lakes.

Of the built up area, industrial buildings made up 5.0% of the total area while housing and buildings made up 33.7% and transportation infrastructure made up 18.5%. Power and water infrastructure as well as other special developed areas made up 1.4% of the area while parks, green belts and sports fields made up 1.7%. Out of the forested land, 12.4% of the total land area is heavily forested and 1.9% is covered with orchards or small clusters of trees. Of the agricultural land, 18.5% is used for growing crops and 5.5% is pastures. All the water in the municipality is flowing water.

The municipality is located in the Worblental (Worblen valley) on a terrace on the Mannenberg (elevation 688 m[2,257 ft]) in the agglomeration of Bern.

In 1983 the municipality was created when it separated from Bolligen.

On 31 December 2009 Amtsbezirk Bern, the municipality's former district, was dissolved. On the following day, 1 January 2010, it joined the newly created Verwaltungskreis Bern-Mittelland.

== Coat of arms ==
The blazon of the municipal coat of arms is Quartered Gules and Or in second a Grenade Sable inflamed of the first and in third a Mill Wheel of the third.

== Demographics ==
Ittigen has a population (as of December 2020) of 11,430. As of 2010, 19.6% of the population are resident foreign nationals. Over the last 10 years (2000–2010) the population has changed at a rate of -2.4%. Migration accounted for -1.3%, while births and deaths accounted for 0.1%.

Most of the population (as of 2000) speaks German (9,477 or 86.2%) as their first language, Italian is the second most common (283 or 2.6%) and French is the third (272 or 2.5%). There are 4 people who speak Romansh.

As of 2008, the population was 48.7% male and 51.3% female. The population was made up of 4,196 Swiss men (38.3% of the population) and 1,130 (10.3%) non-Swiss men. There were 4,602 Swiss women (42.0%) and 1,018 (9.3%) non-Swiss women. Of the population in the municipality, 1,701 or about 15.5% were born in Ittigen and lived there in 2000. There were 4,723 or 43.0% who were born in the same canton, while 2,104 or 19.1% were born somewhere else in Switzerland, and 2,034 or 18.5% were born outside of Switzerland.

As of 2010, children and teenagers (0–19 years old) make up 18.4% of the population, while adults (20–64 years old) make up 62.2% and seniors (over 64 years old) make up 19.4%.

As of 2000, there were 4,346 people who were single and never married in the municipality. There were 5,229 married individuals, 591 widows or widowers and 825 individuals who are divorced.

As of 2000, there were 1,923 households that consist of only one person and 199 households with five or more people. In 2000, a total of 4,964 apartments (94.4% of the total) were permanently occupied, while 198 apartments (3.8%) were seasonally occupied and 99 apartments (1.9%) were empty. As of 2010, the construction rate of new housing units was 1.1 new units per 1000 residents. The vacancy rate for the municipality, in 2011, was 0.5%.

The historical population is given in the following chart:

== Heritage sites of national significance ==
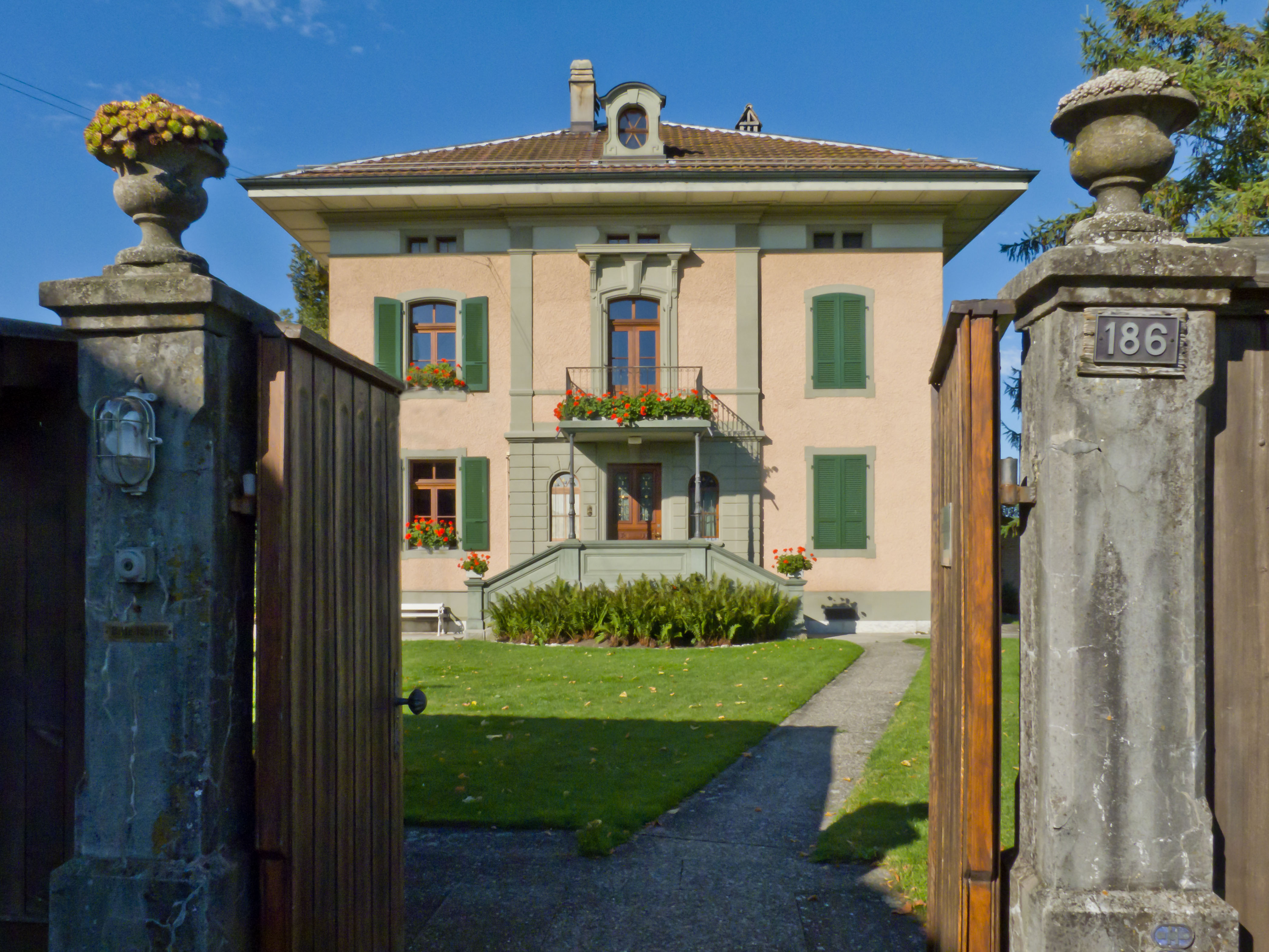
Gosteli Stiftung building

The Gosteli Foundation with its archive of the History of the Swiss Feminist Movement is listed as a Swiss heritage site of national significance. The entire Worbletal (Worble valley) which includes; Bolligen, Ittigen, Ostermundigen and Stettlen is part of the Inventory of Swiss Heritage Sites.

== Politics ==
In the 2011 federal election the most popular party was the SVP which received 22.7% of the vote. The next three most popular parties were the SPS (19.1%), the BDP Party (15.2%) and the FDP (14.6%). In the federal election, a total of 3,610 votes were cast, and the voter turnout was 47.8%.

== Economy ==
As of 2011, Ittigen had an unemployment rate of 2.61%. As of 2008, there were a total of 8,976 people employed in the municipality. Of these, there were 19 people employed in the primary economic sector and about 4 businesses involved in this sector. 867 people were employed in the secondary sector and there were 82 businesses in this sector. 8,090 people were employed in the tertiary sector, with 387 businesses in this sector.

In 2008 there were a total of 7,873 full-time equivalent jobs. The number of jobs in the primary sector was 17, all of which were in agriculture. The number of jobs in the secondary sector was 815 of which 537 or (65.9%) were in manufacturing and 258 (31.7%) were in construction. The number of jobs in the tertiary sector was 7,041. In the tertiary sector; 738 or 10.5% were in wholesale or retail sales or the repair of motor vehicles, 724 or 10.3% were in the movement and storage of goods, 192 or 2.7% were in a hotel or restaurant, 1,874 or 26.6% were in the information industry, 411 or 5.8% were the insurance or financial industry, 354 or 5.0% were technical professionals or scientists, 125 or 1.8% were in education and 315 or 4.5% were in health care.

In 2000, there were 5,490 workers who commuted into the municipality and 4,882 workers who commuted away. The municipality is a net importer of workers, with about 1.1 workers entering the municipality for every one leaving. Of the working population, 41.6% used public transportation to get to work, and 38.5% used a private car.

In 2019, Ittigen was involved in a controversy relating to highway rest stop parking fines. The incident occurred in the Grauholz motorway service area, after a woman briefly used the restroom and received a parking ticket in the said stop.

== Religion ==
From the 2000 census, 2,279 or 20.7% were Roman Catholic, while 6,064 or 55.2% belonged to the Swiss Reformed Church. Of the rest of the population, there were 214 members of an Orthodox church (or about 1.95% of the population), there were 23 individuals (or about 0.21% of the population) who belonged to the Christian Catholic Church, and there were 651 individuals (or about 5.92% of the population) who belonged to another Christian church. There were 10 individuals (or about 0.09% of the population) who were Jewish, and 387 (or about 3.52% of the population) who were Islamic. There were 52 individuals who were Buddhist, 125 individuals who were Hindu and 15 individuals who belonged to another church. 1,092 (or about 9.94% of the population) belonged to no church, are agnostic or atheist, and 382 individuals (or about 3.48% of the population) did not answer the question.

== Education ==
In Ittigen about 4,719 or (42.9%) of the population have completed non-mandatory upper secondary education, and 1,716 or (15.6%) have completed additional higher education (either university or a Fachhochschule). Of the 1,716 who completed tertiary schooling, 66.5% were Swiss men, 23.1% were Swiss women, 6.3% were non-Swiss men and 4.1% were non-Swiss women.

The Canton of Bern school system provides one year of non-obligatory Kindergarten, followed by six years of Primary school. This is followed by three years of obligatory lower Secondary school where the students are separated according to ability and aptitude. Following the lower Secondary students may attend additional schooling or they may enter an apprenticeship.

During the 2009–10 school year, there were a total of 1,474 students attending classes in Ittigen. There were 8 kindergarten classes with a total of 168 students in the municipality. Of the kindergarten students, 35.1% were permanent or temporary residents of Switzerland (not citizens) and 52.4% have a different mother language than the classroom language. The municipality had 28 primary classes and 522 students. Of the primary students, 30.5% were permanent or temporary residents of Switzerland (not citizens) and 39.5% have a different mother language than the classroom language. During the same year, there were 16 lower secondary classes with a total of 275 students. There were 25.8% who were permanent or temporary residents of Switzerland (not citizens) and 42.5% have a different mother language than the classroom language.

As of 2000, there were 321 students in Ittigen who came from another municipality, while 329 residents attended schools outside the municipality.

== Notable people ==
- Hans Zulliger (1893–1965 in Ittigen), child psychoanalyst, author and primary school teacher in Ittigen from 1912 until 1959
- Marthe Gosteli (1917 in Worblaufen – 2017), suffrage activist and archivist
- Daniel Bernhardt (born 1965), actor, model and martial artist.
- Jürg M. Stauffer (born 1977), Swiss politician from Ittigen
- Marc Hirschi (born 1998), professional cyclist
