= Zollikofen–Bern railway =

Railway line in Bern, Switzerland

Overview
- Line number: 309
- Termini: Zollikofen; Bern

Service
- Operator(s): Regionalverkehr Bern-Solothurn

Technical
- Line length: 5.35 km (3.32 mi)
- Number of tracks: 2
- Track gauge: 1,000 mm (3 ft 3 3/8 in)
- Electrification: 1250 V DC overhead catenary
- Maximum incline: 4.5%

The Zollikofen–Bern railway is a metre-gauge and electrified railway line in the canton of Bern in Switzerland.

== History ==
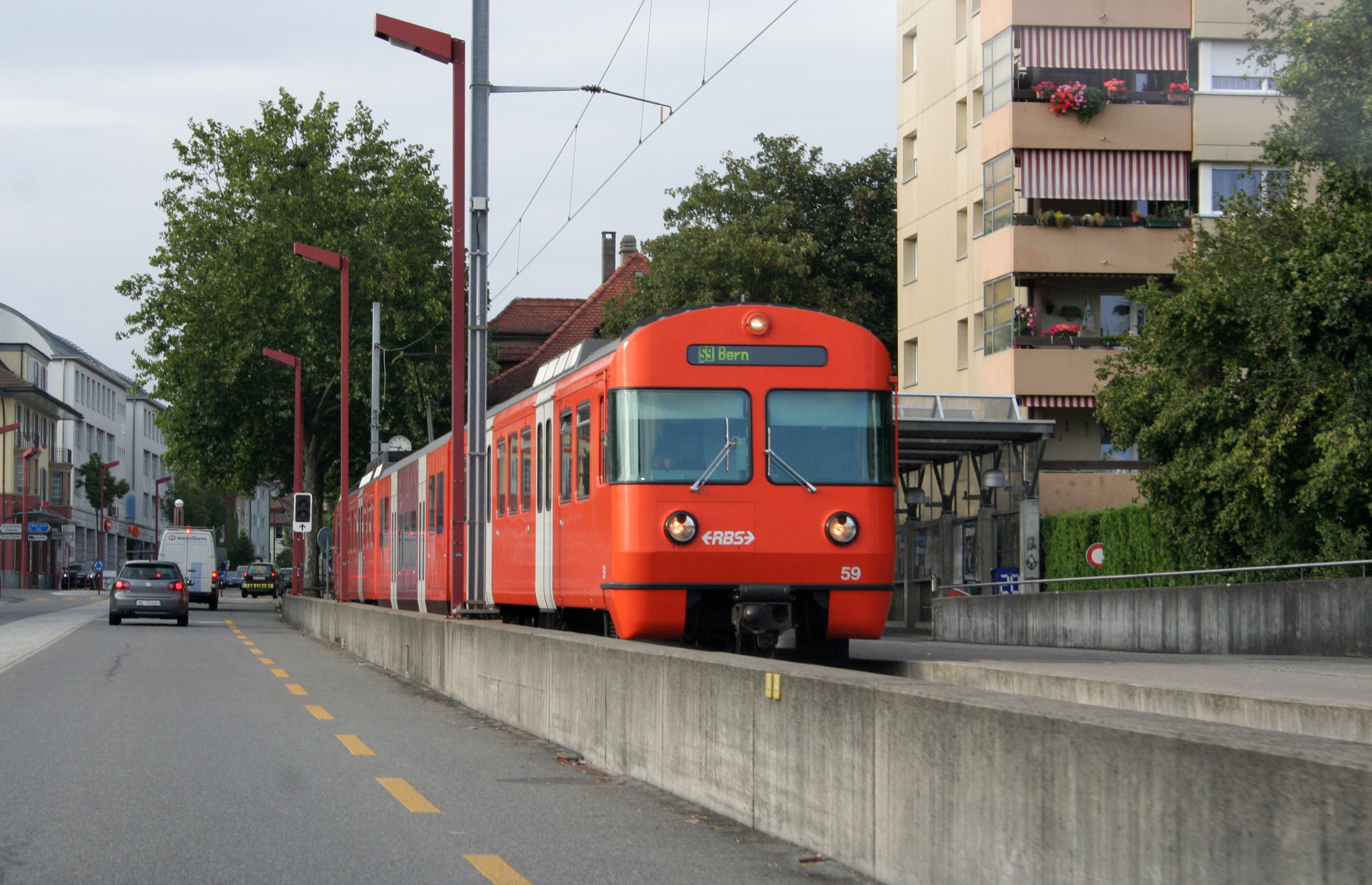
An RBS train in Unterzollikofen

The originally approximately eight-kilometer-long railway line was opened by the former Bern-Zollikofen-Bahn on 13 July 1912. The Solothurn-Zollikofen-Bern Bahn (Solothurn-Zollikofen-Bern Railway, SZB) was responsible for its operation from 1 January 1922.

It is now 5.35 kilometres (3.32 mi) long as a result of the line being rebuilt in the city of Bern in 1965 and the closure of the 1.16 kilometres (0.72 mi)-long Zollikofen–Unterzollikofen section in 1974. It is shared by the trains of the Solothurn–Worblaufen railway and the trains of the Worb Dorf–Worblaufen railway between Worblaufen and Bern.

All three routes have been operated since 1 January 1984 by Regionalverkehr Bern-Solothurn (RBS) and are integrated into the Bern S-Bahn. The line to Unterzollikofen is served by line S9. Worblaufen is its operating centre and is also the location of a depot and a workshop. By contrast, the current terminus at Unterzollikofen has only one dead-end track with a single platform edge.
