= Worb Dorf railway station =

Railway station in Worb, Switzerland

Worb Dorf
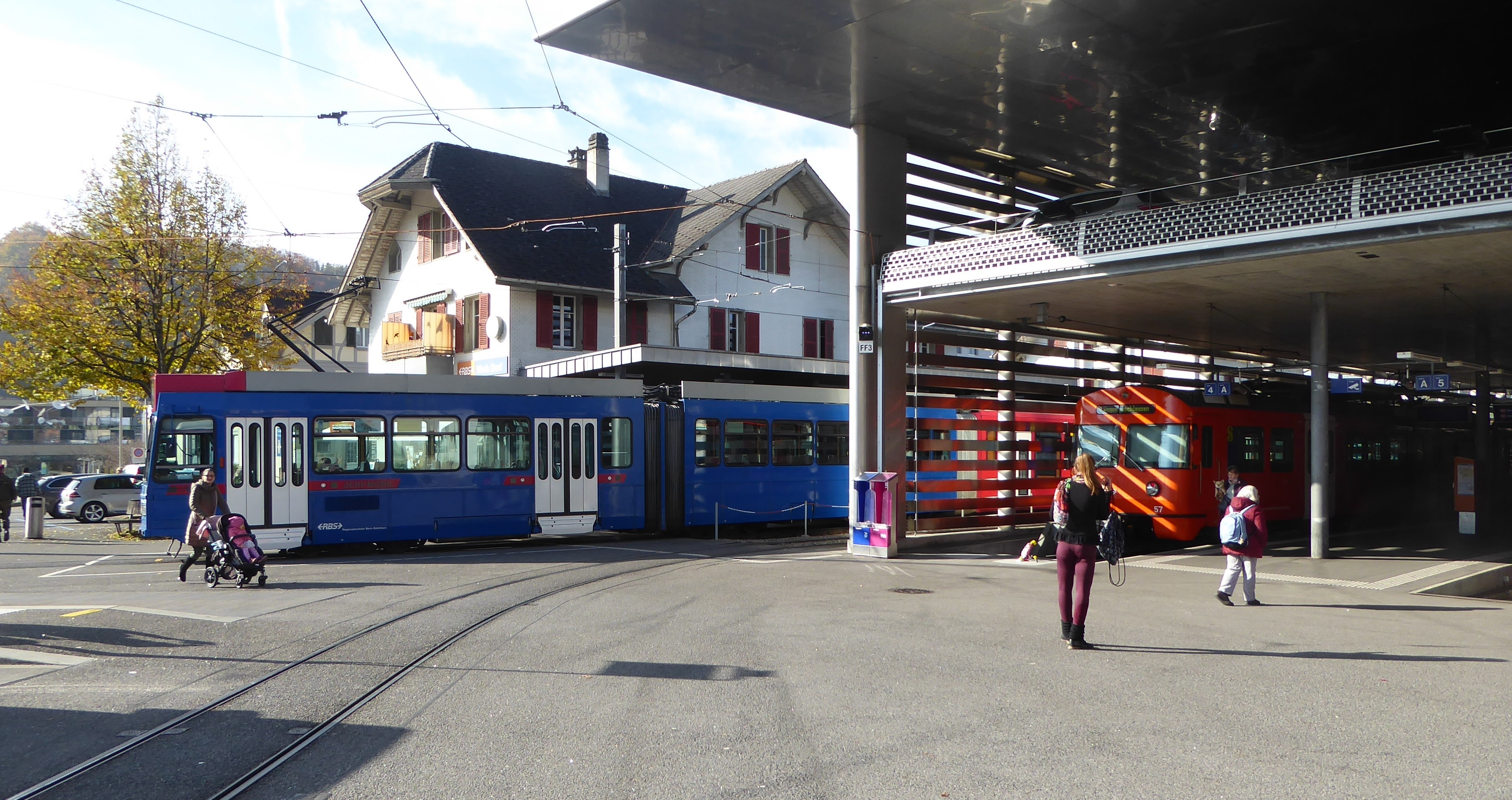
- The station in 2018

General information
- Location: Worb; Switzerland
- Coordinates: 46°55′48″N 7°33′43″E
- Elevation: 585 m (1,919 ft)
- Owner: Regionalverkehr Bern-Solothurn
- Line: Worb Dorf–Worblaufen line
- Platforms: 2 (1 island platform)
- Tracks: 2
- Train operators: Regionalverkehr Bern-Solothurn
- Connections: Tram line 6; PostAuto AG bus lines; BERNMOBIL bus line

Construction
- Accessible: Yes

Other information
- Station code: 8507063 (WBDO)
- Fare zone: 115 (Libero)

Services
Preceding station	Bern S-Bahn	Following station
Worbboden towards Bern	S7	Terminus
Location

Worb Dorf railway station (German: Bahnhof Worb Dorf) is a railway station in the municipality of Worb, in the Swiss canton of Bern. It is the eastern terminus of the 1,000 mm (3 ft 3 3/8 in) gauge Worb Dorf–Worblaufen line of Regionalverkehr Bern-Solothurn. The station is located in the city center; another station, Worb SBB, is located 1.8 kilometres (1.1 mi) south on the standard gauge Bern–Lucerne line of Swiss Federal Railways.

== Services ==
The following services stop at Worb Dorf:

- Bern S-Bahn: S7: service every fifteen minutes to Bern.

== Gallery ==
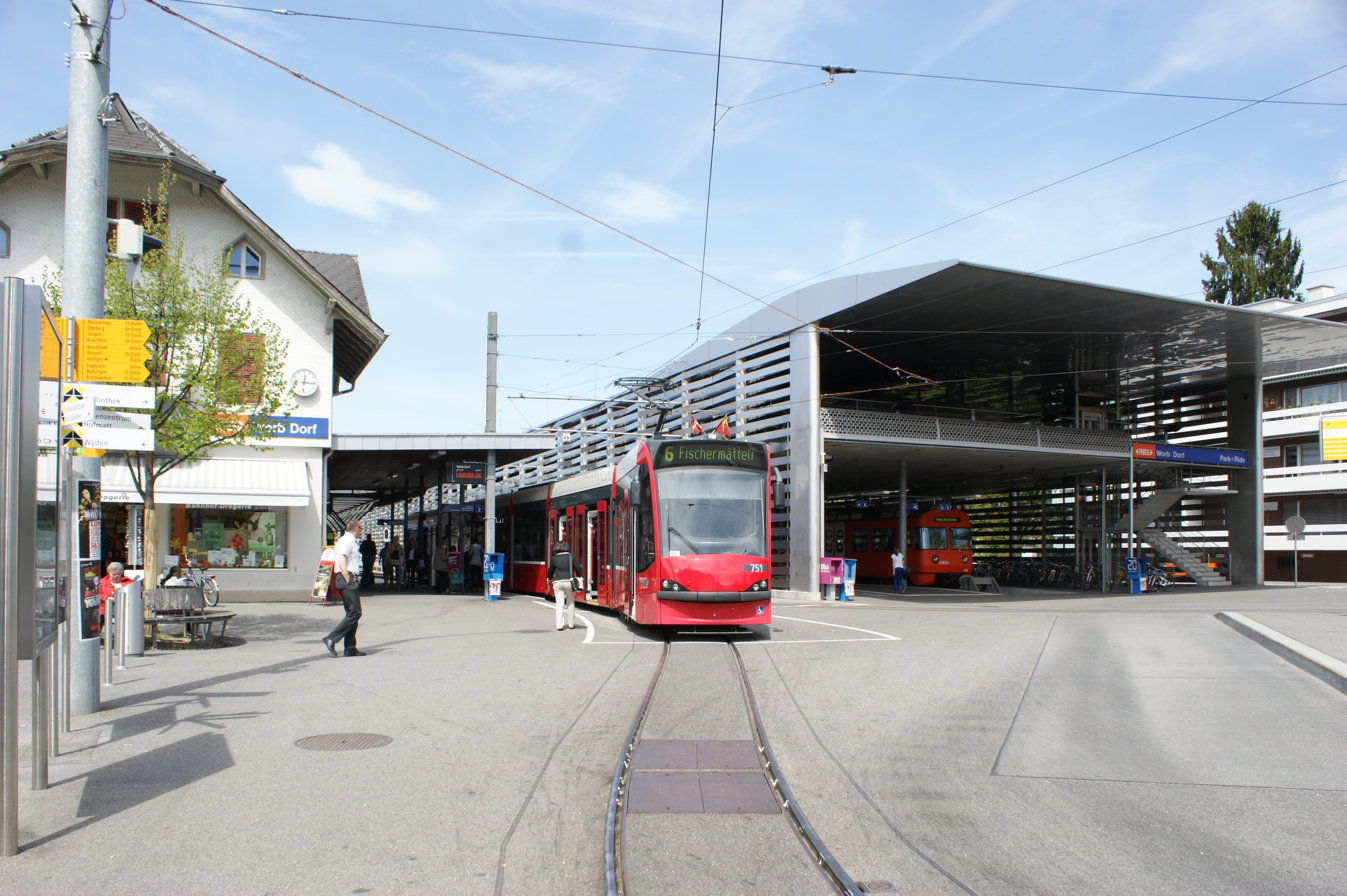
tram of line 6 between the station building (left) and the train shed of the Worb Dorf-Worlaufen railway (right) engaging in the track loop in the foreground, with a bus stop in its center and hiking fingerpost to the left (2012)

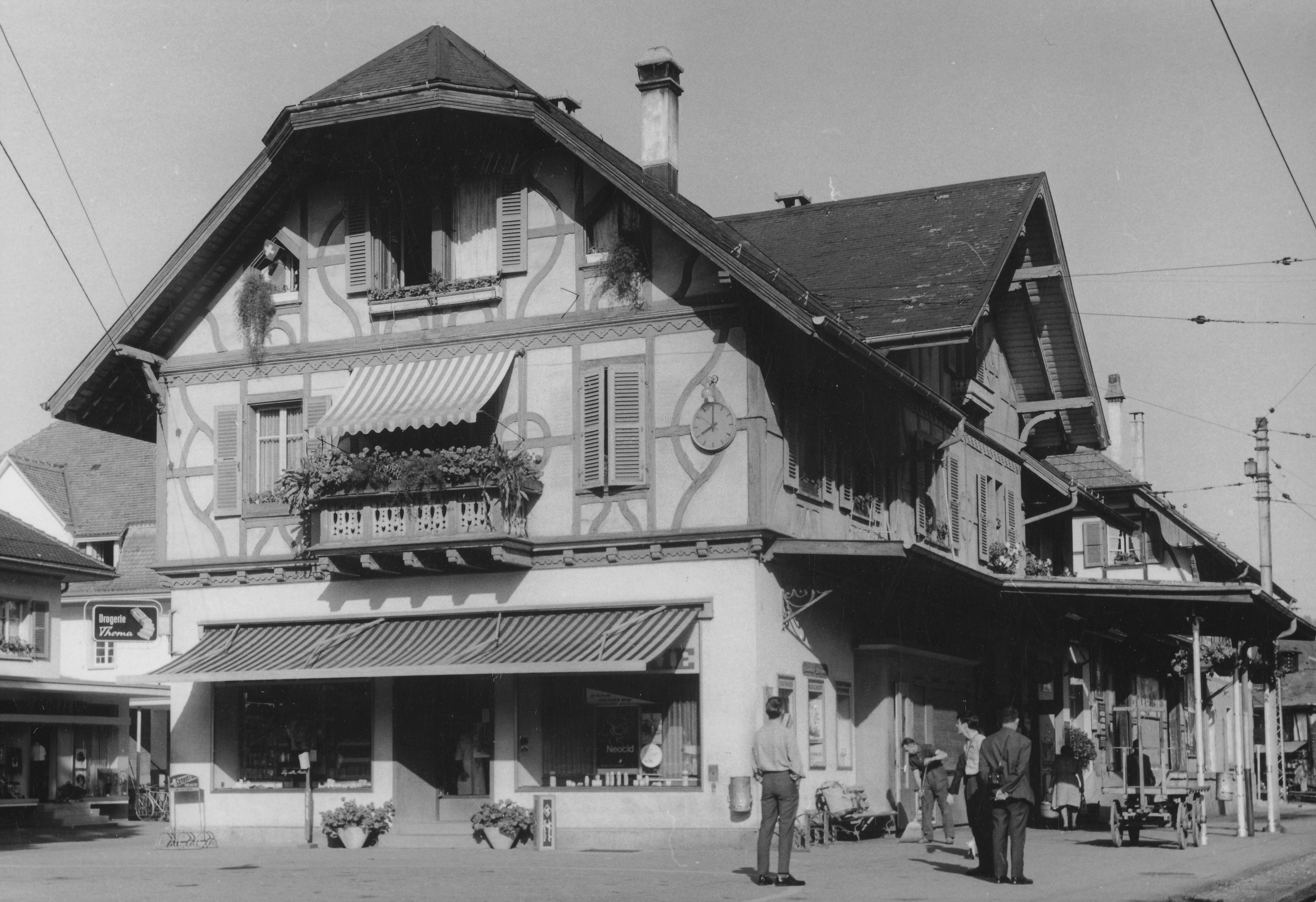
station building in 1966
