= Bern Europaplatz railway station =

Railway station in Bern, Switzerland

Bern Europaplatz

General information
- Location: Europaplatz; Bern; Switzerland
- Coordinates: 46°56′35″N 7°24′25″E
- Elevation: 551 m (1,808 ft)
- Owner: BLS AG; Swiss Federal Railways
- Lines: Bern–Schwarzenburg line; Gürbetal line; Lausanne–Bern line
- Distance: 94.1 km (58.5 mi) from Lausanne
- Platforms: 4: 2 side platforms; 1 island platform
- Tracks: 4
- Train operators: BLS AG
- Connections: Tram lines 7 and 8; BERNMOBIL buses

Construction
- Parking: Yes
- Cycle facilities: 85
- Accessible: Partly

Other information
- Station code: 8504108 (BNAS)
- Fare zone: 100 and 101 (Libero)

History
- Former names: Bern-Ausserholligen SBB, Bern-Ausserholligen GBS

Passengers
- 2023: 6'700 per weekday (BLS, SBB)

Services
Preceding station	Bern S-Bahn	Following station
Bern Bümpliz Süd towards Fribourg/Freiburg	S1	Bern towards Thun
Bern Bümpliz Süd towards Laupen BE	S2	Bern towards Langnau i.E.
Bern Weissenbühl towards Belp	S3	Bern towards Biel/Bienne
Bern Weissenbühl towards Belp	S31	Bern towards Münchenbuchsee or Biel/Bienne
Liebefeld towards Schwarzenburg	S6	Bern Terminus
Location

Bern Europaplatz railway station is a railway station in the Swiss canton of Bern and city of Bern that is a major public transport interchange. The station has two levels and groups of platforms, with the upper one on the SBB-owned Olten to Lausanne line and the lower one on the BLS-owned Gürbetal line. Until 2014, the two groups of platforms were regarded as separate stations, known as Ausserholligen SBB and Ausserholligen GBS respectively, but in that year they were both renamed after the adjacent Zentrum Europaplatz and are now shown as a single station on public transport maps.

The upper group of platforms form an intermediate stop on Bern S-Bahn lines S1, between Bern and Fribourg/Freiburg, and S2, between Bern and Laupen BE. The lower level group of platforms form an intermediate stop on S-Bahn lines S3 and S31, between Bern and Belp, and S6, between Bern and Schwarzenburg (using the Bern–Schwarzenburg line). All five lines operate half-hourly for most of the day, providing ten trains per hour between Europaplatz and Bern, and all are operated by BLS.

The public transport interchange at Europaplatz also includes the Europaplatz Bahnhof stop on Bern tramway routes 7 and 8 and Bernmobil bus route 31. The A12 motorway passes over both stations and the interchange on a viaduct.

== Gallery ==
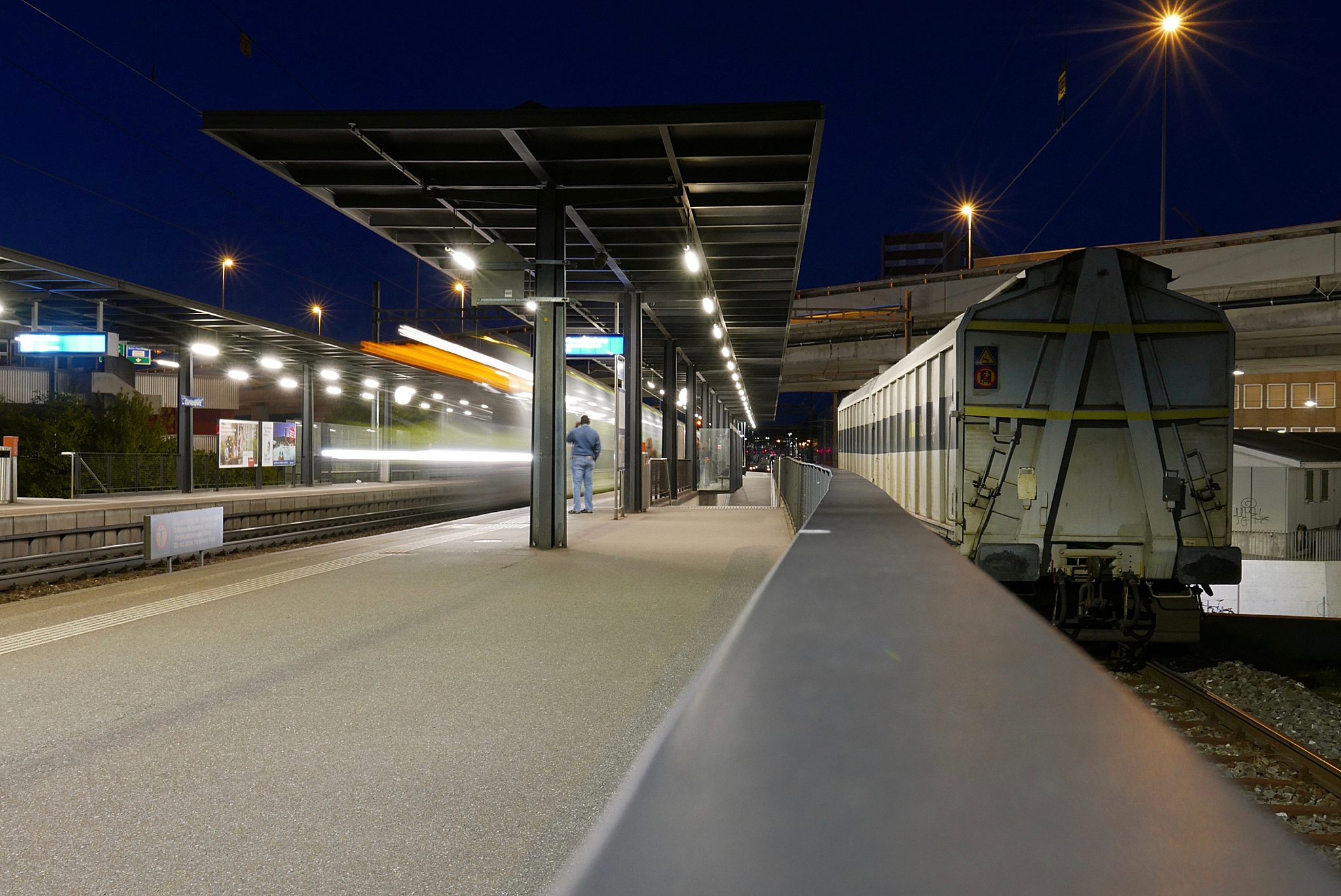
The upper platforms

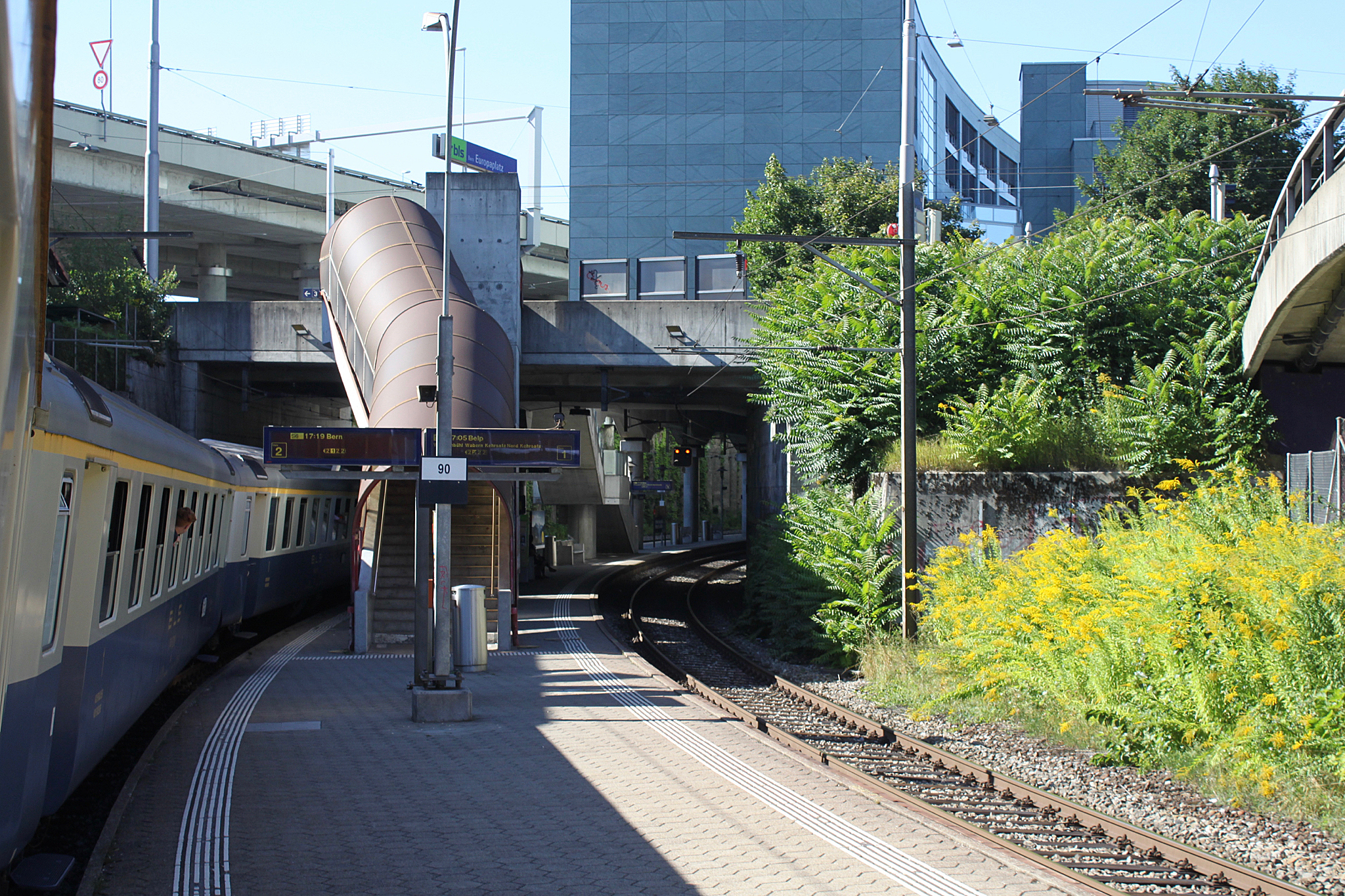
The lower platforms

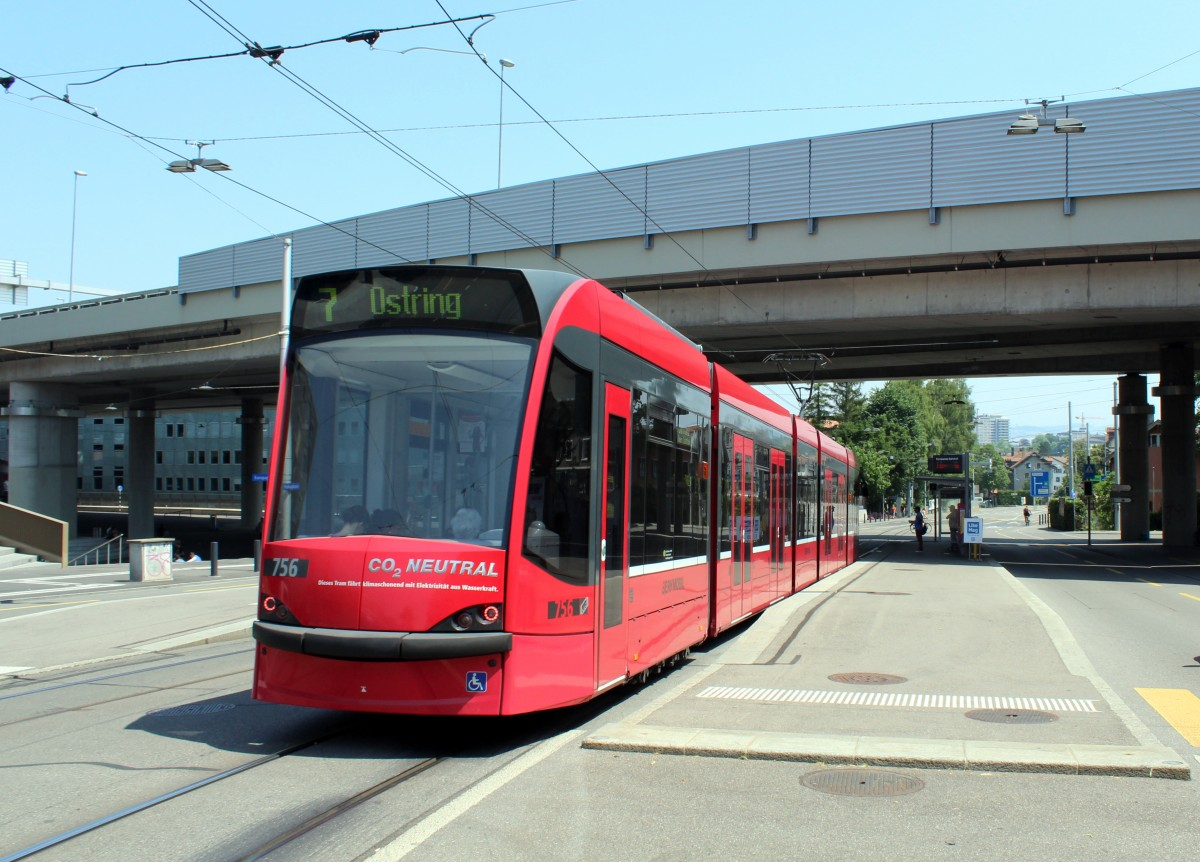
The tram stop
