= Wabern railway station =

Wabern railway station may refer to:

- Wabern bei Bern railway station, in the canton of Bern, Switzerland
- Wabern (Bz Kassel) railway station, in the state of Hesse, Germany
