= Gurten Funicular =

Funicular railway at Bern, Switzerland

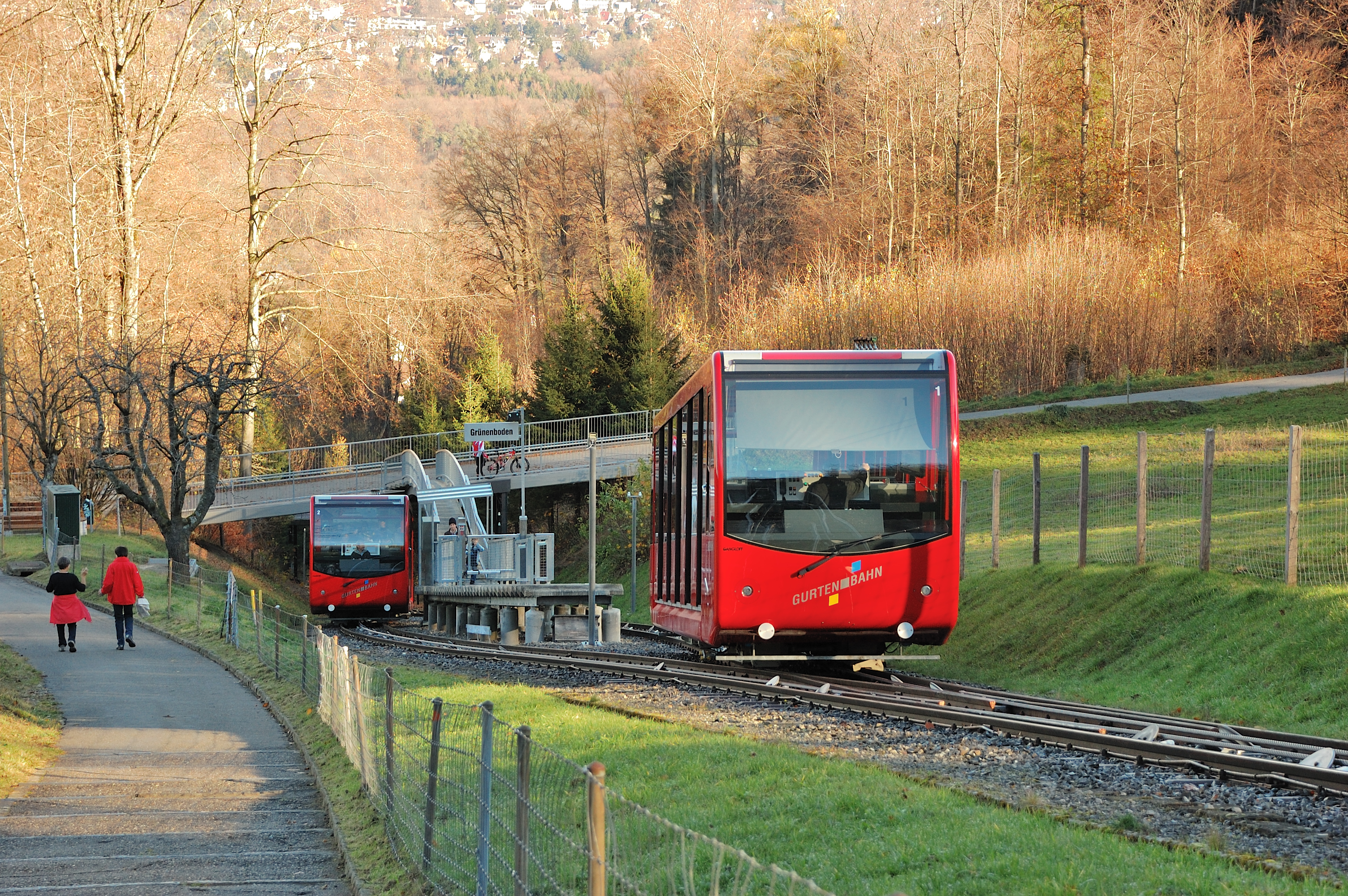
- The two cars at the passing loop and intermediary station (2010)

Overview
- Other names: Drahtseilbahn von Grosswabern auf die Höhe des Gurtens; Standseilbahn von Wabern nach Gurten-Kulm
- Native name: Gurtenbahn
- Status: in operation
- Owner: Gurtenbahn Bern AG (since 1927); Elektrische Gurtenbahn (1899–1927, name change)
- Locale: Köniz, canton of Bern, Switzerland
- Coordinates: 46.923831°N 7.443023°E
- Termini: "Wabern (Gurtenbahn)"; "Gurten Kulm"
- Stations: 3 (including "Grünenboden")

Service
- Type: Funicular
- Route number: 2351 (earlier: 1351)
- Operator(s): Gurtenbahn Bern AG
- Rolling stock: 2 for 120 passengers each

History
- Opened: 12 August 1899 (126 years ago)
- Concession: 1893
- City-owned: 1926 (majority, City of Bern)
- Enhancements: 1931, 1944, 1949, 1966, 1999

Technical
- Line length: 1,059 metres (3,474 ft)
- Number of tracks: 1 with passing loop
- Track gauge: 1,000 mm (3 ft 3 3/8 in)
- Electrification: Since opening
- Operating speed: 8 metres per second (26.2 ft/s)
- Highest elevation: 839.5 m (2,754 ft)
- Maximum incline: 34%

The Gurten Funicular (German: Gurtenbahn) is a funicular railway in the southern suburbs of the Swiss federal city of Bern. The line links Wabern, in the municipality of Köniz, with the summit of the Gurten mountain (858 m; 2,815 ft), which overlooks the city of Bern.

Wabern can be reached from the city centre by tram, train or car. Wabern bei Bern station, on lines S3 and S31 of the Bern S-Bahn, is adjacent to the lower station of the Gurtenbahn, as is the Gurtenbahn stop on Bern tramway route 9.

The line is owned and operated by the company Gurtenbahn Bern AG.

== History ==
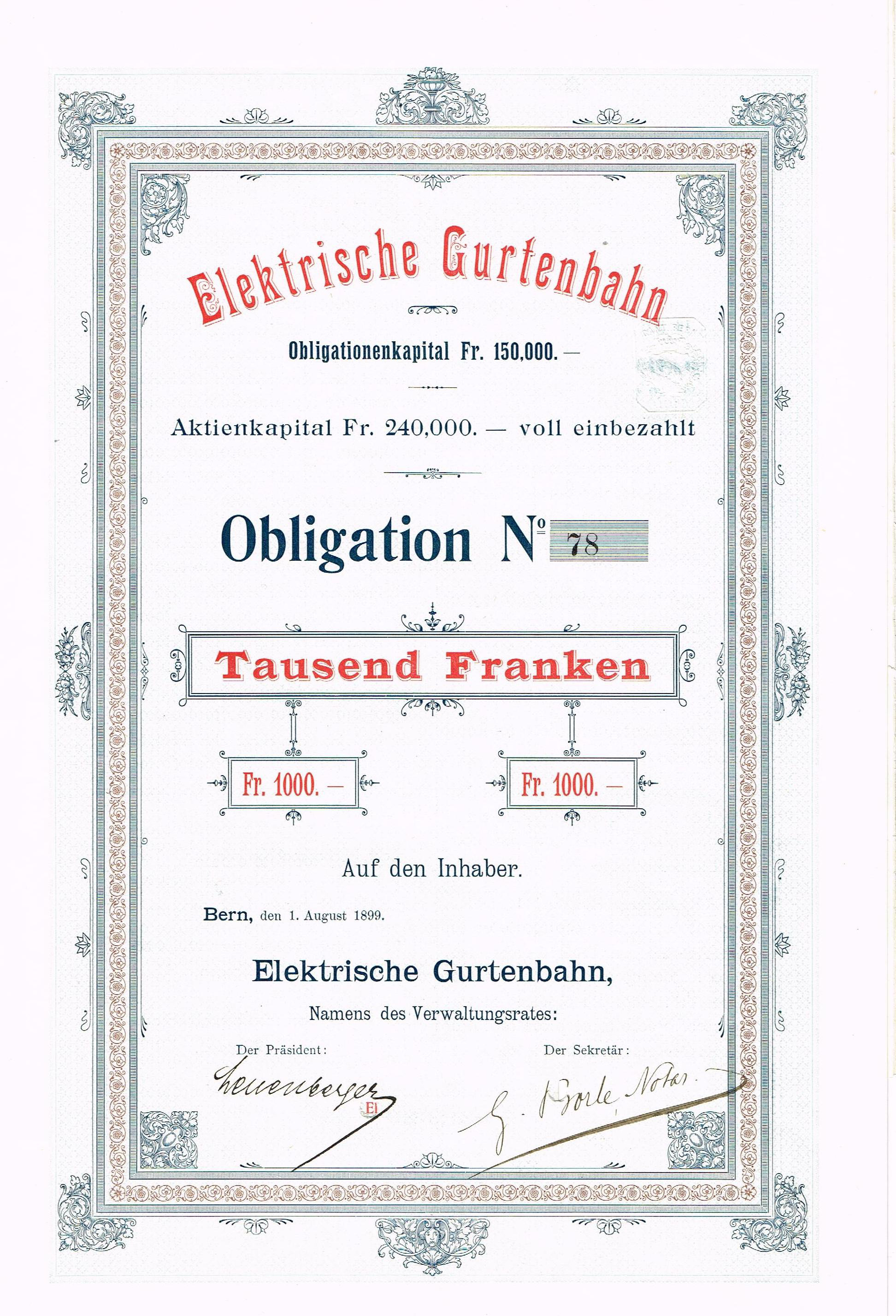
Bond of the Elektrische Gurtenbahn company, issued 1. August 1899

The first concession for a line up the Gurten was granted in 1885 but never realized. A second concession was granted in 1893 and the line opened in 1899. In 1931 and 1932 the cars were overhauled and a new drive installed. In 1944 new cars were supplied and the lower station redesigned, with the upper station following in 1949. In 1966 the plant was renewed again.

In 1999, the line was completely rebuilt. All the stations were renovated, the drive was replaced, and new panorama carriages were put into operation.

In 2015, the line carried over one million passengers, the largest annual ridership up until that year. In the same year, the line made a profit of around 250,000 Swiss francs.

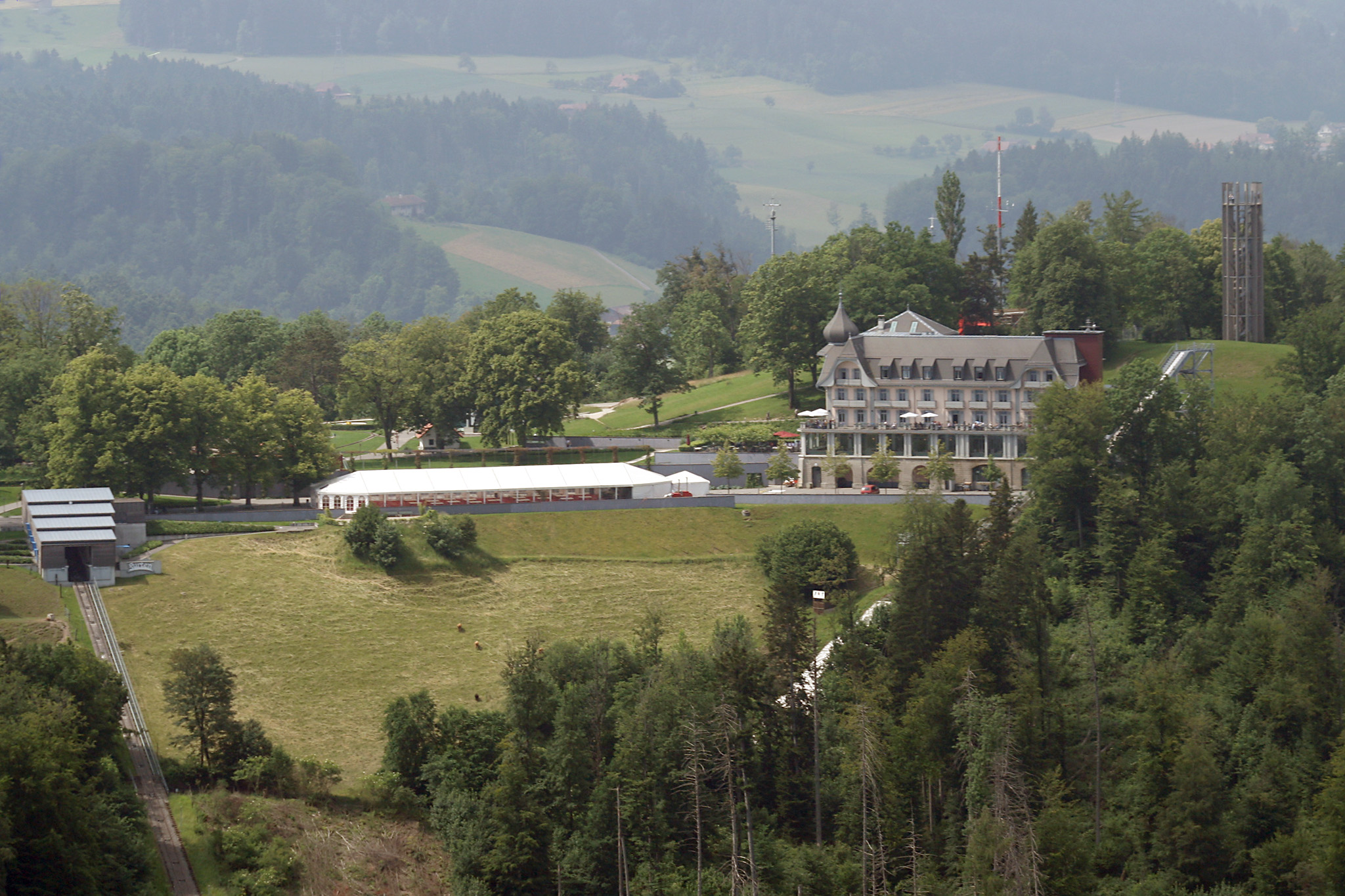
The summit of the line, with upper station to left

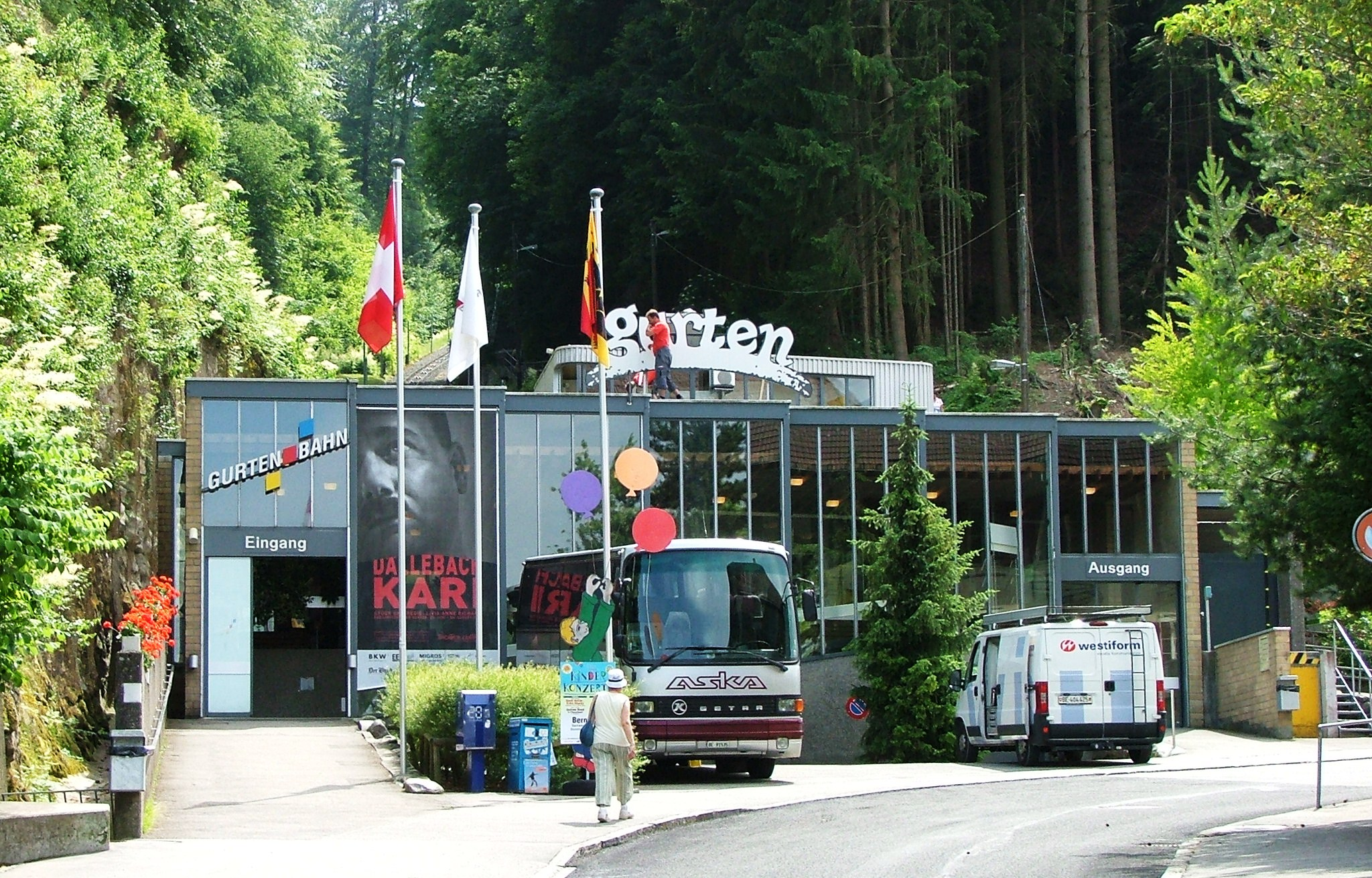
Lower station (2006)

== Operation ==
The line is operated by the Gurtenbahn company. It has the following parameters:

Feature	Value
Number of cars	2
Number of stops	3 (at terminals and passing loop)
Configuration	Single track with passing loop
Track length	1,058 metres (3,471 ft)
Rise	267 metres (876 ft)
gradient	34%
Track gauge	1,000 mm (3 ft 3 3/8 in)
Capacity	120 passengers per car
Maximum speed	8 metres per second (26.2 ft/s)
Travel time	5 minutes

== See also ==
- List of funicular railways
- List of funiculars in Switzerland
