= South Campus station =

South Campus station may refer to:

- South Campus/Fort Edmonton Park station, a light rail transit station in Edmonton, Alberta
- Durgabai Deshmukh South Campus metro station, a rapid transit station in Delhi, India
- University South Campus station, a light rail station in Salt Lake City, Utah
- University station (Buffalo Metro Rail), originally named South Campus station

== See also ==
- South Campus (disambiguation)
- South Station (disambiguation)
- Campus station
