= South Station (disambiguation) =

South Station is a train station in Boston, Massachusetts, United States.

Other stations with the word south in their names include:

== Australia ==
- Elizabeth South railway station
- South Bank railway station, Brisbane
- South Brisbane railway station

== Austria ==
- Graz Hauptbahnhof (Graz Südbahnhof)
- Wien Südbahnhof

== Belgium ==
- Antwerpen-Zuid railway station
- Brussels-South railway station
- Charleroi-South railway station
- Haren-South railway station

== China ==
- Beijing South railway station
- Guangzhou South railway station
- Tianjin South station

== Denmark ==
- Faxe Syd Station, Faxe
- Græsted South railway halt (Græsted Syd)
- Hadsund South Station

== France ==
- Gare de Colmar-Sud, Colmar
- Gare du Sud, Nice

== Germany ==
- Bad Oeynhausen Süd station
- Bad Schönborn Süd station
- Bad St Peter Süd station
- Berlin Messe Süd railway station
- Chemnitz Süd station
- Darmstadt Süd station
- Essen Süd station
- Frankfurt (Main) Süd station
- Greifswald Süd station
- Hilden Süd station
- Kolkwitz Süd station
- Köln Süd station
- Kronberg (Taunus) Süd station
- Lichterfelde Süd station
- Limburg Süd station
- Mainz Römisches Theater station (Mainz Süd)
- Marburg Süd station
- München Süd station
- Recklinghausen Süd station

== Hungary ==
- Budapest Déli station

== Italy ==
- Saronno Sud railway station

== Netherlands ==
- Amsterdam Zuid station
- Arnhem Zuid railway station
- Barneveld Zuid railway station
- Bussum Zuid railway station
- Den Helder Zuid railway station
- Diemen Zuid station
- Dordrecht Zuid railway station
- Emmen Zuid railway station
- Kampen Zuid railway station
- Lelystad Zuid railway station
- Rotterdam Zuid railway station
- Santpoort Zuid railway station
- Soest Zuid railway station

== Russia ==
- Kaliningrad South railway station (Калининград-Южный)

== Sweden ==
- Arlanda South Station (Arlanda södra station)
- Örebro South Station, Örebro
- Stockholm South Station

== Switzerland ==
- Bern Bümpliz Süd railway station
- Bern Weissenbühl railway station
- Corcelles-Sud railway station
- Grenchen Süd railway station
- Langenthal Süd railway station
- Vaulruz-Sud railway station, Vaulruz
- Vuadens-Sud railway station, Vuadens

== Ukraine ==
- Pivdennyi Vokzal (Kharkiv Metro)

== United Kingdom ==
=== London ===
- South Acton railway station
- Bromley South railway station
- Chessington South railway station
- Clapham South tube station
- Coulsdon South railway station
- Morden South railway station
- South Croydon railway station
- South Ealing tube station
- South Greenford railway station
- South Harrow tube station
- South Kensington tube station
- South Kenton station
- South Merton railway station
- South Ruislip station
- South Wimbledon tube station
- South Woodford tube station

=== Elsewhere ===
- Blackpool South railway station
- Dorchester South railway station
- Reddish South railway station
- Thorne South railway station
- Whyteleafe South railway station

== United States ==
- South Station (subway), a Boston subway station co-located with the train station of the same name

== See also ==
- North Station (disambiguation)
- East Station (disambiguation)
- West station (disambiguation)
