= Gurten (mountain) =

Mountain situated just to the south of Bern

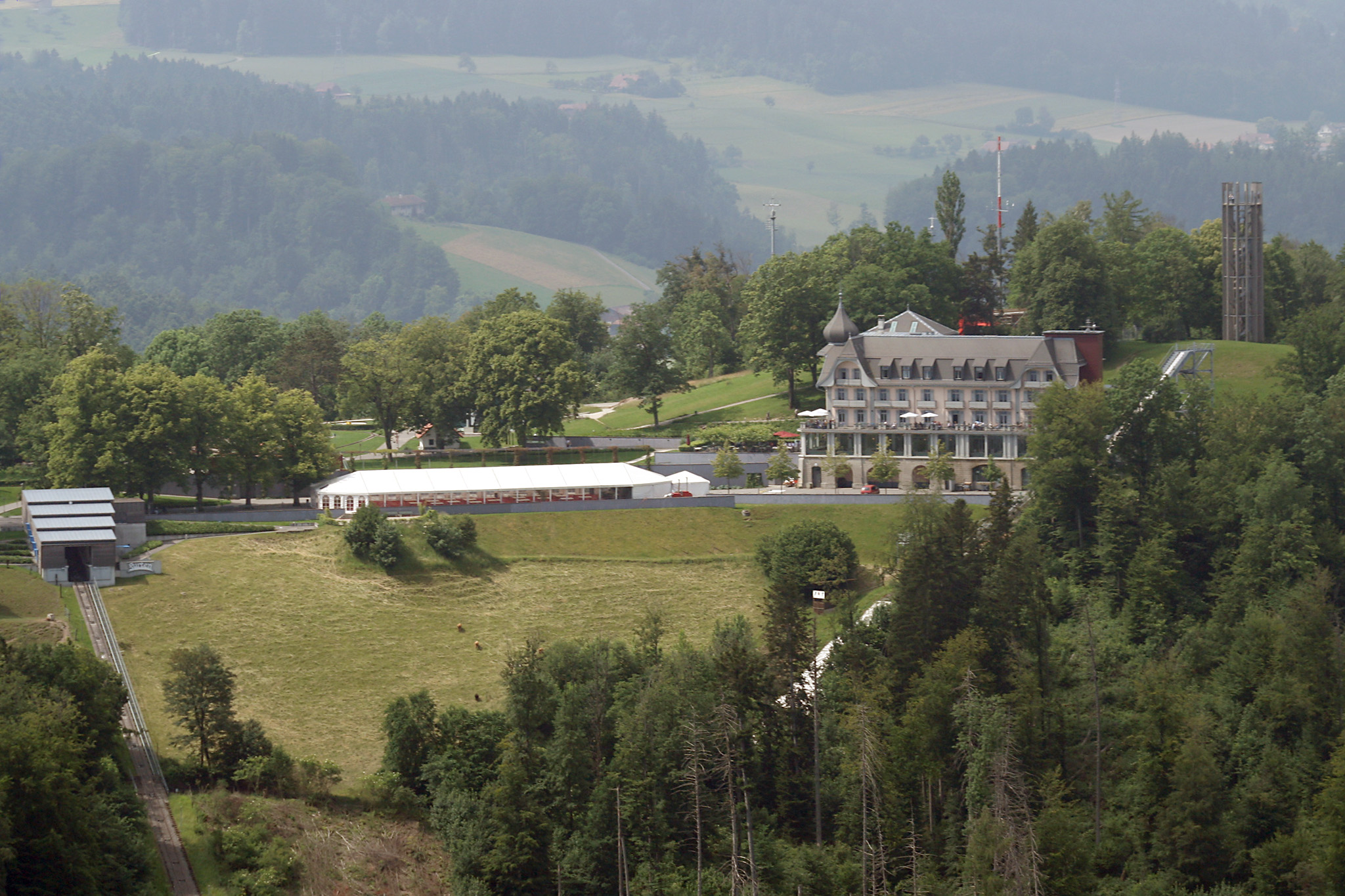
- The summit of the Gurten

Highest point
- Elevation: 858 m (2,815 ft)
- Prominence: 215 m (705 ft)
- Coordinates: 46°55′02″N 07°26′37″E

Geography
- Location within Switzerland
- Location: Bern, Switzerland

The Gurten is a mountain situated just to the south of Bern, the capital city of Switzerland. It is 858 metres (2,815 ft) high, and the summit yields views of Bern, of the Jura Mountains and of the Alps.

Facilities on the Gurten include a hotel, restaurants, a 25-metre-high (82 ft) viewing tower and a children's playground. Winter sports facilities are available in winter. The Gurtenfestival, a music festival, is held every year in the middle of July.

The Gurten is accessible on foot, or by the Gurten Funicular from Wabern. Wabern can itself be reached from central Bern by tram, train or car. Wabern bei Bern station, on lines S3 and S31 of the Bern S-Bahn, is adjacent to the lower station of the funicular, as is the Gurtenbahn stop on Bern tramway route 9.

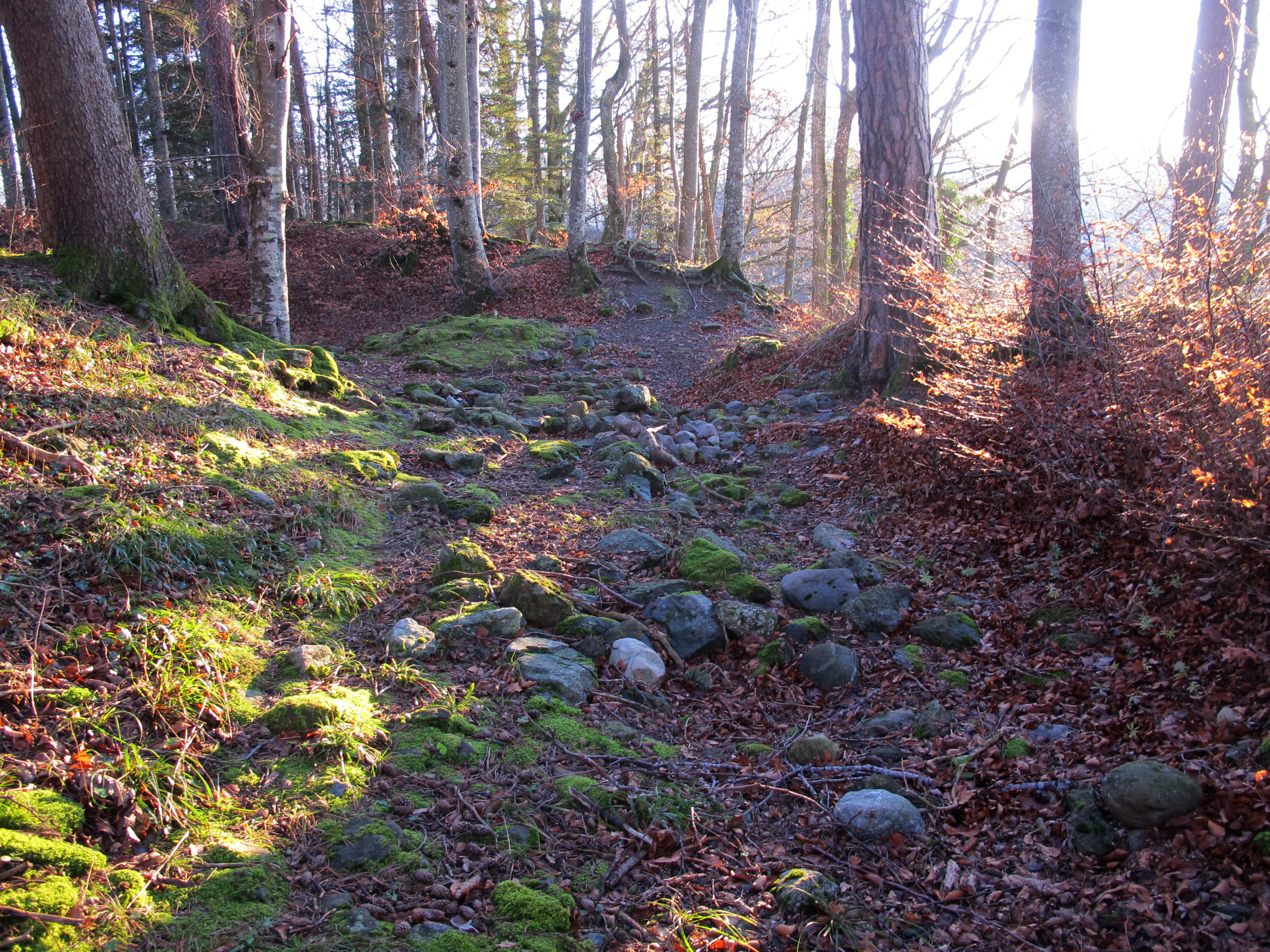
Ruins of the Ägerten castle

The castle site of Aegerten lies a good 1 kilometre (0.62 mi) to the south-east of the Gurten summit. The remains consists of a roundish castle hill, which formerly carried a rectangular donjon, surrounded on three sides by a wall and rench.

== See also ==
- List of mountains of Switzerland accessible by public transport
