= Niederwangen railway station =

Railway station in Köniz, Switzerland

Niederwangen
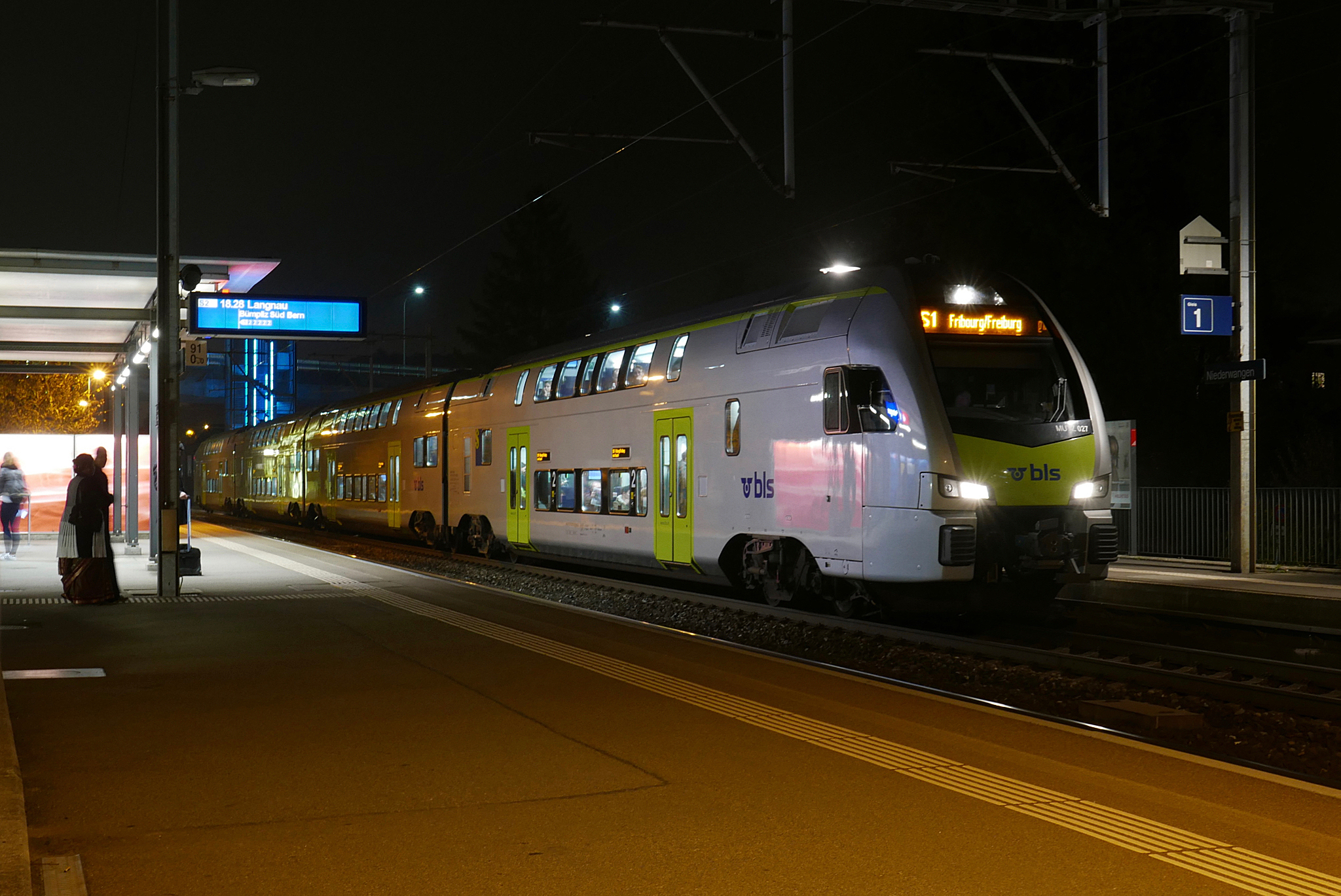
- A BLS-operated S1 service at Niederwangen in 2016

General information
- Location: Köniz; Switzerland
- Coordinates: 46°55′32″N 7°22′35″E
- Elevation: 568 m (1,864 ft)
- Owner: Swiss Federal Railways
- Line: Lausanne–Bern line
- Distance: 91.0 km (56.5 mi) from Lausanne
- Platforms: 2 side platforms
- Tracks: 2
- Train operators: BLS AG
- Connections: BERNMOBIL buses

Construction
- Parking: Yes
- Cycle facilities: Yes (18 spaces)
- Accessible: No

Other information
- Station code: 8504105 (NWA)
- Fare zone: 101 (Libero)

Passengers
- 2023: 2'200 per weekday (BLS)

Services
Preceding station	Bern S-Bahn	Following station
Thörishaus Dorf towards Fribourg/Freiburg	S1	Bern Bümpliz Süd towards Thun
Oberwangen towards Laupen BE	S2	Bern Bümpliz Süd towards Langnau i.E.
Location

Niederwangen railway station (German: Bahnhof Niederwangen) is a railway station in the municipality of Köniz, in the Swiss canton of Bern. It is an intermediate stop on the standard gauge Lausanne–Bern line of Swiss Federal Railways.

== Services ==
As of the December 2024 timetable change, the following services stop at Niederwangen:

- Bern S-Bahn:
  - S1: half-hourly service between Fribourg/Freiburg and Thun.
  - S2: half-hourly service between Laupen BE and Langnau.
