= Wabern bei Bern railway station =

Railway station in Köniz, Switzerland

Wabern bei Bern
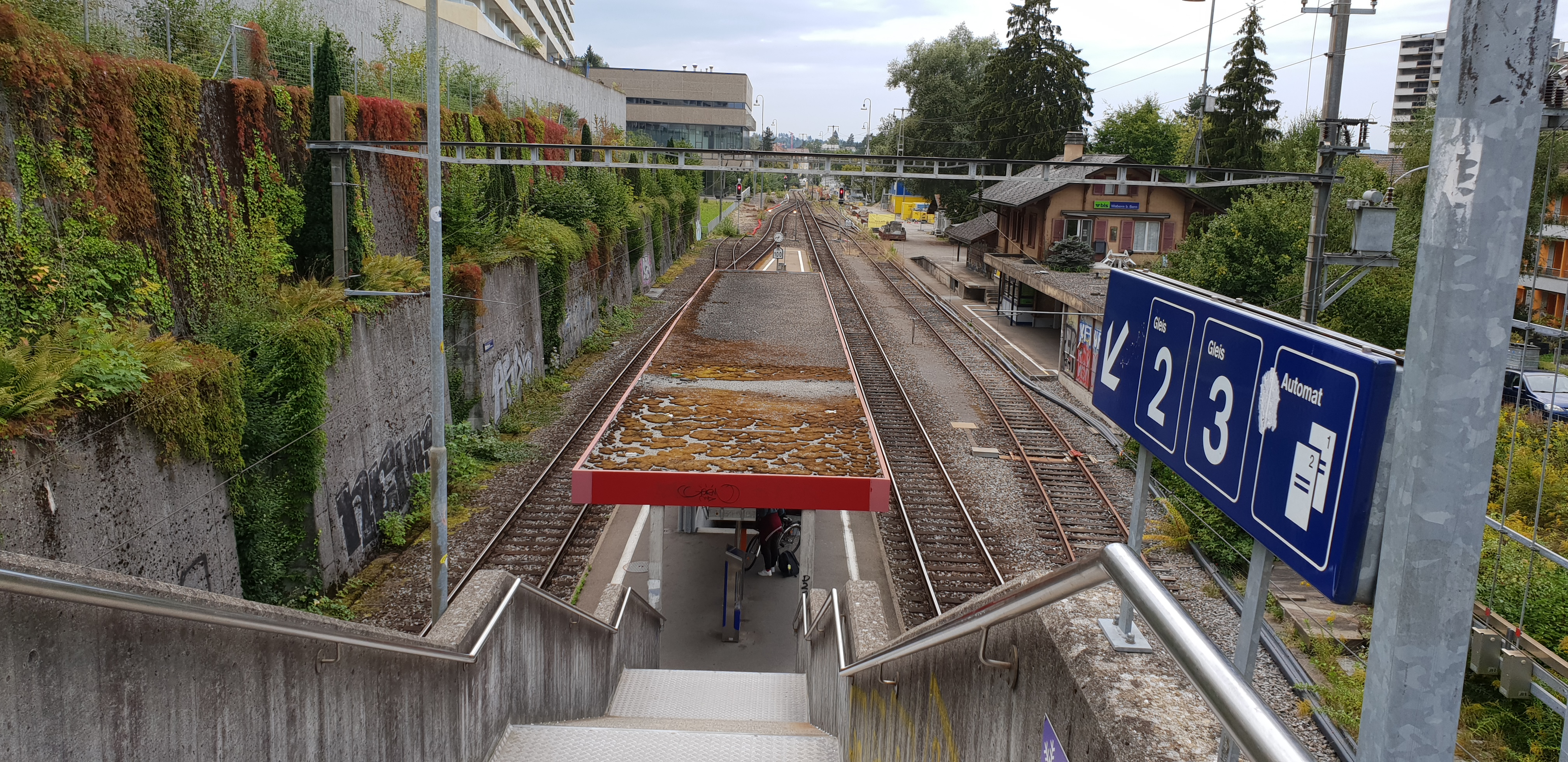
- The station in 2018 before the overhaul, looking to the west from the overbridge

General information
- Location: Köniz; Switzerland
- Coordinates: 46°55′44″N 7°26′46″E
- Elevation: 560 m (1,840 ft)
- Owner: BLS AG
- Line: Gürbetal line
- Distance: 6.6 km (4.1 mi) from Bern
- Platforms: 2 side platforms
- Tracks: 2
- Train operators: BLS AG
- Connections: Tram line 9; BERNMOBIL buses; Gurtenbahn

Construction
- Parking: None available
- Accessible: Yes

Other information
- Station code: 8507078 (WBB)
- Fare zone: 101 (Libero)

Passengers
- 2023: 1'600 per weekday (BLS)

Services
Preceding station	Bern S-Bahn	Following station
Bern Weissenbühl towards Biel/Bienne	S3	Kehrsatz Nord towards Belp
Bern Weissenbühl towards Münchenbuchsee or Biel/Bienne	S31	Kehrsatz Nord towards Belp
Location

Wabern bei Bern railway station is a railway station in the Swiss canton of Bern and municipality of Köniz. It serves, and derives its name from, the village of Wabern bei Bern, in reality a suburb of the city of Bern. The station is on the Gürbetal line and is operated by BLS AG.

Wabern bei Bern station is adjacent to the lower station of the Gurtenbahn, a funicular that provides access to the summit of the Gurten, as well as to the Gurtenbahn stop on Bern tramway route 9.

The station has a two side platforms, flanked on each side by running lines. The platforms are accessed by a staircases from the overbridge carrying the access road to the Gurtenbahn, and by a subway from the station buildings, which lie on the northern side of the line.

== Services ==
As of the December 2024 timetable change, the following services stop at Wabern bei Bern:

- Bern S-Bahn:
  - S3: half-hourly service between Biel/Bienne and Belp.
  - S31: rush-hour service between Münchenbuchsee or Biel/Bienne and Belp.

== Gallery ==
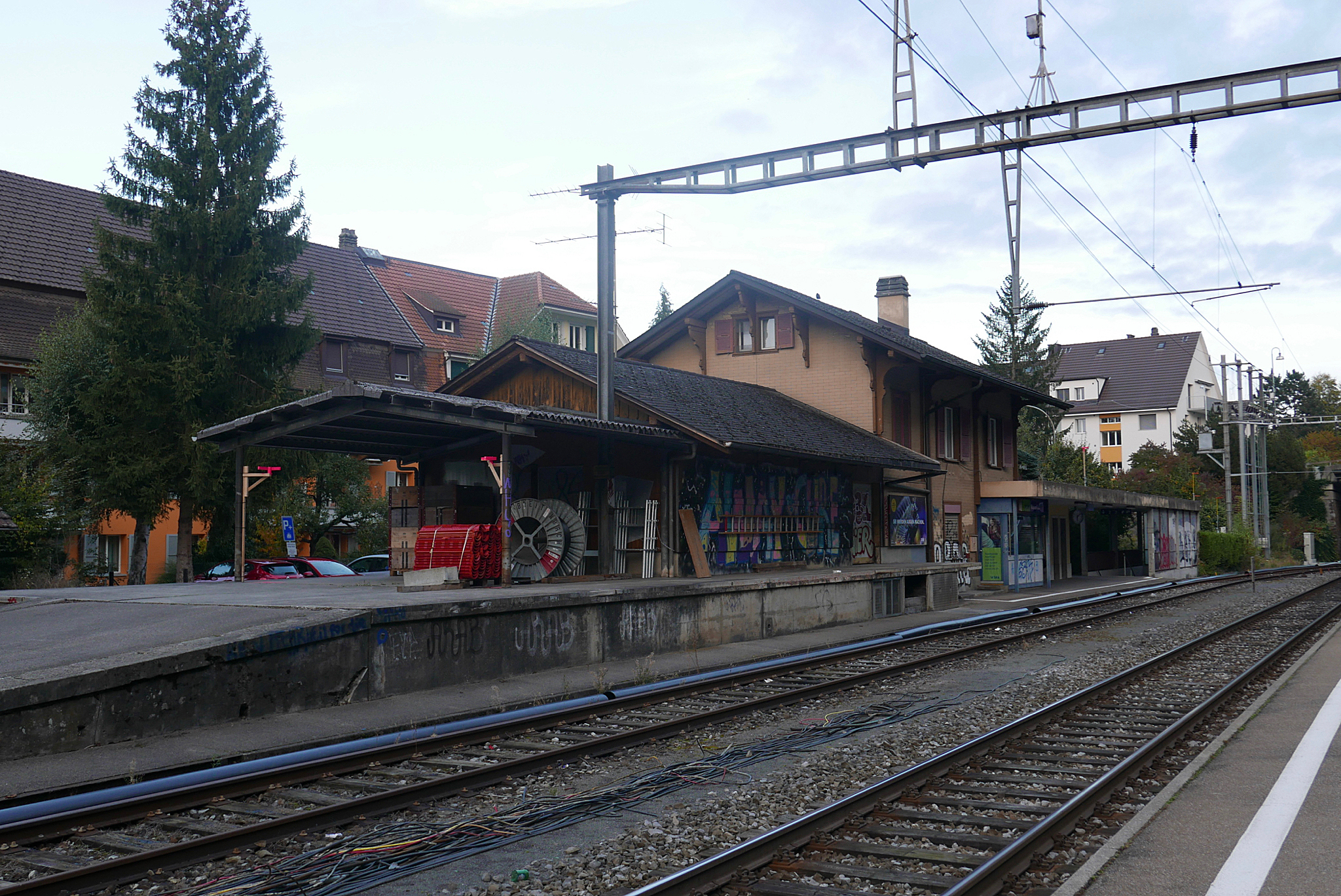
The station buildings, seen from the island platform

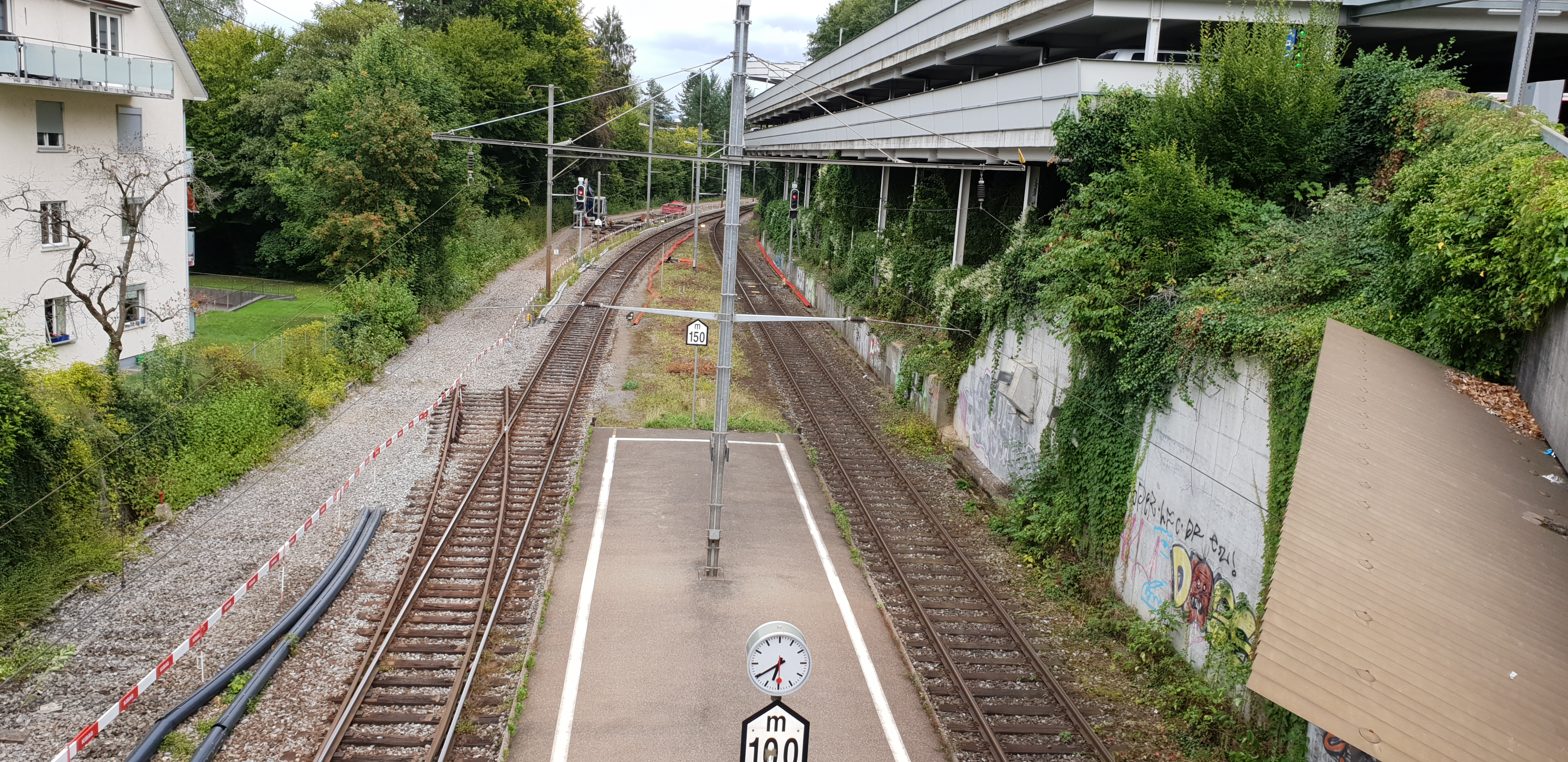
The station, looking to the east from the overbridge
