= Wabern =

Wabern may refer to:

- Wabern, Hesse, a community in the Schwalm-Eder district in northern Hesse, Germany
- Wabern bei Bern, a village in the Köniz municipality in the canton of Bern, Switzerland
