= Oberwangen railway station =

Railway station in Köniz, Switzerland

Oberwangen
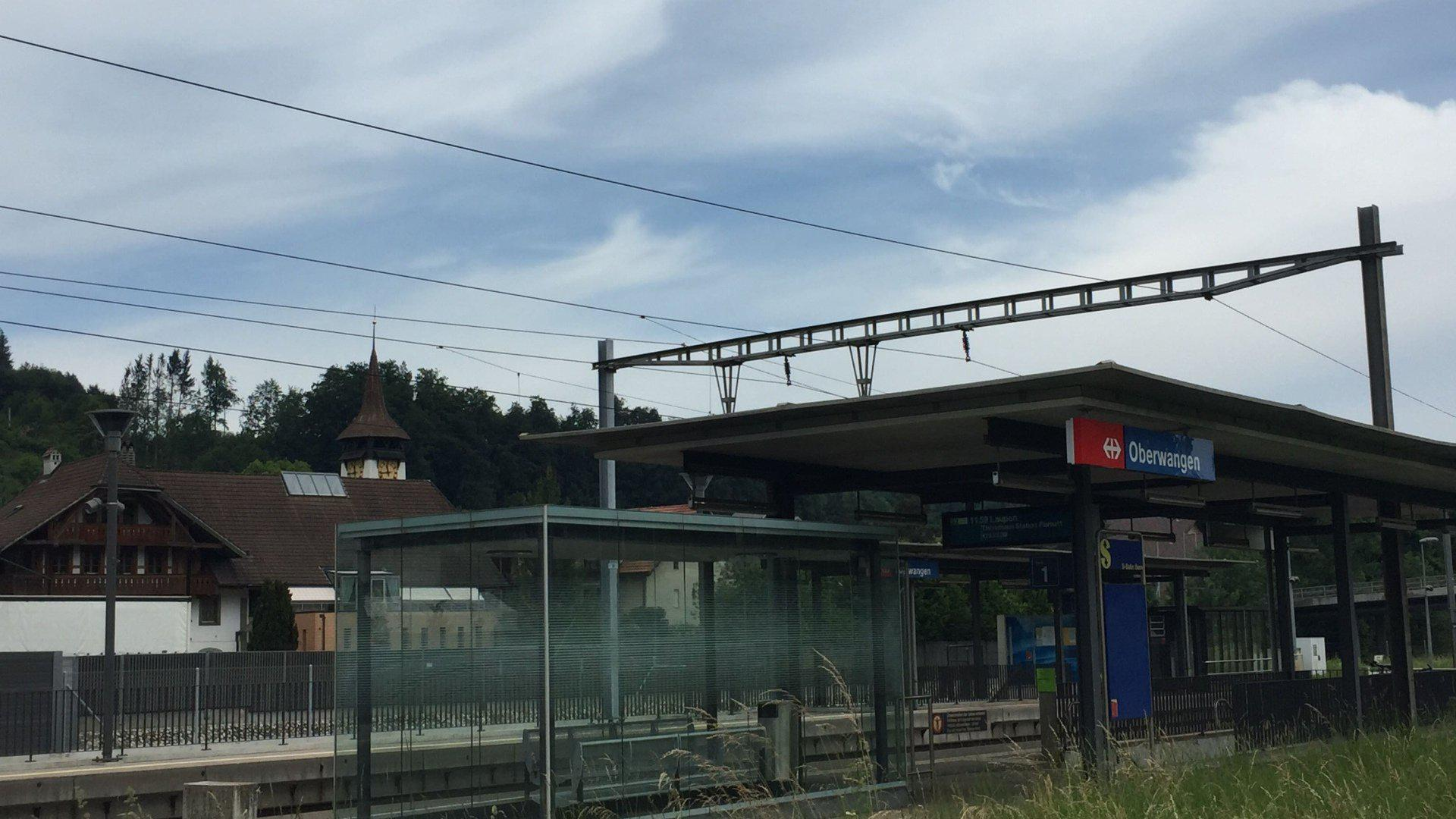
- The station platforms in 2018

General information
- Location: Köniz; Switzerland
- Coordinates: 46°54′52″N 7°21′44″E
- Elevation: 575 m (1,886 ft)
- Owner: Swiss Federal Railways
- Line: Lausanne–Bern line
- Distance: 89.4 km (55.6 mi) from Lausanne
- Platforms: 2 side platforms
- Tracks: 2
- Train operators: BLS AG

Construction
- Parking: Yes (7 spaces)
- Cycle facilities: Yes (7 spaces)
- Accessible: Yes

Other information
- Station code: 8504117 (OWA)
- Fare zone: 101 (Libero)

Passengers
- 2023: 660 per weekday (BLS)

Services
Preceding station	Bern S-Bahn	Following station
Thörishaus Station towards Laupen BE	S2	Niederwangen towards Langnau i.E.
Location

Oberwangen railway station (German: Bahnhof Oberwangen) is a railway station in the municipality of Köniz, in the Swiss canton of Bern. It is an intermediate stop on the standard gauge Lausanne–Bern line of Swiss Federal Railways.

== Services ==
As of the December 2024 timetable change, the following services stop at Oberwangen:

- Bern S-Bahn S2: half-hourly service between Laupen BE and Langnau.
