= Bern Weissenbühl railway station =

Railway station in Bern, Switzerland

Bern Weissenbühl
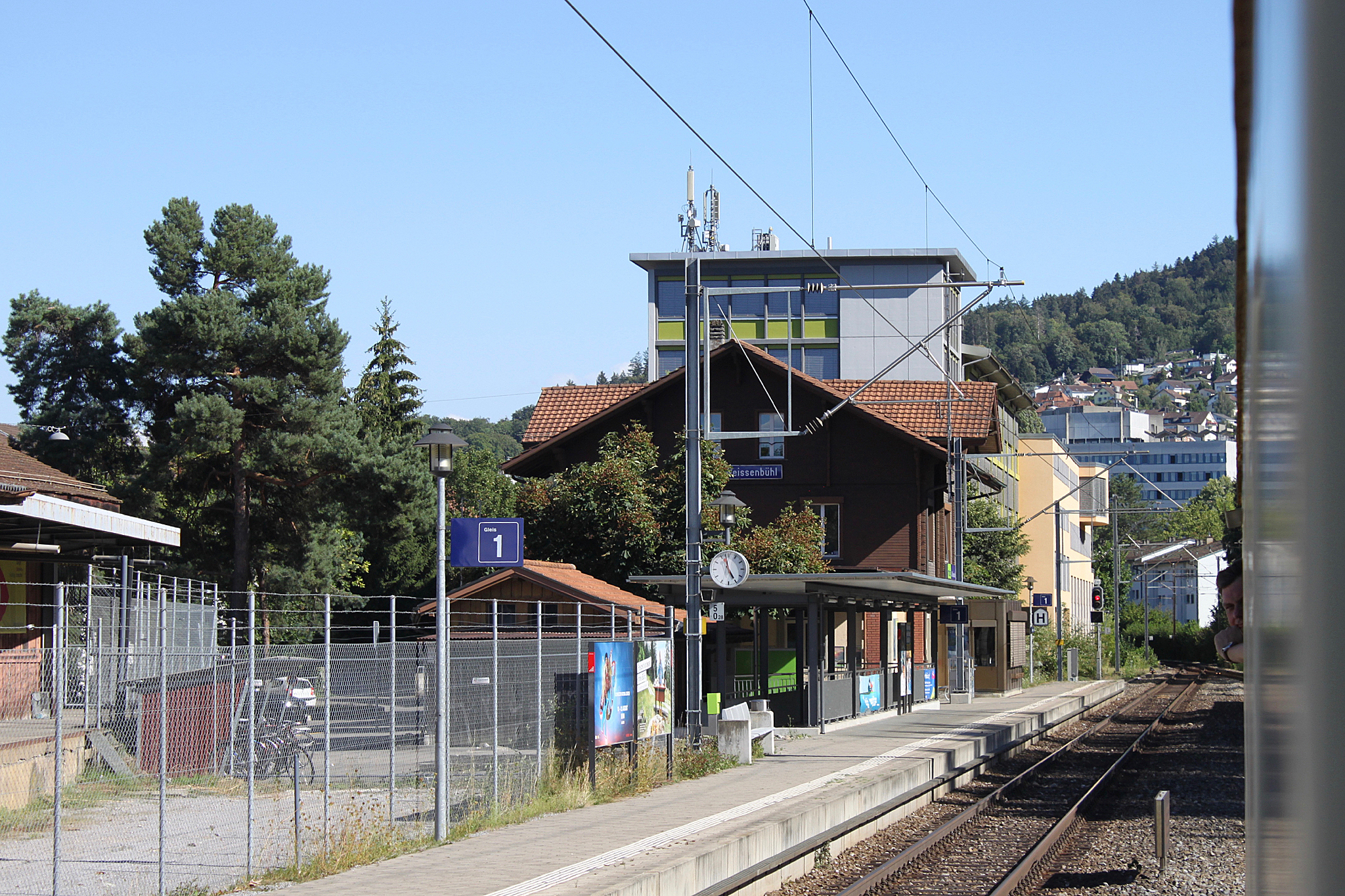
- The station in 2018

General information
- Location: Südbahnhofstrasse; Bern; Switzerland
- Coordinates: 46°56′10″N 7°25′48″E
- Elevation: 550 m (1,800 ft)
- Owner: BLS AG
- Line: Gürbetal line
- Distance: 5.1 km (3.2 mi) from Bern
- Platforms: 2 side platforms
- Tracks: 2
- Train operators: BLS AG
- Connections: BERNMOBIL bus service

Construction
- Accessible: Yes

Other information
- Station code: 8507079 (BNWE)
- Fare zone: 100 (Libero)

Passengers
- 2023: 1'400 per weekday (BLS)

Services
Preceding station	Bern S-Bahn	Following station
Bern Europaplatz towards Biel/Bienne	S3	Wabern bei Bern towards Belp
Bern Europaplatz towards Münchenbuchsee or Biel/Bienne	S31	Wabern bei Bern towards Belp
Location

Bern Weissenbühl railway station is a railway station in the Swiss canton of Bern and city of Bern. It serves, and derives its name from, the Weissenbühl quarter of that city. It is located on Bern's "Südbahnhofstrasse" (south station street). The station is on the Gürbetal line and is operated by BLS AG.

== Services ==
As of the December 2024 timetable change, the following services stop at Bern Weissenbühl:

- Bern S-Bahn:
  - S3: half-hourly service between Biel/Bienne and Belp.
  - S31: rush-hour service between Münchenbuchsee or Biel/Bienne and Belp.

== Gallery ==
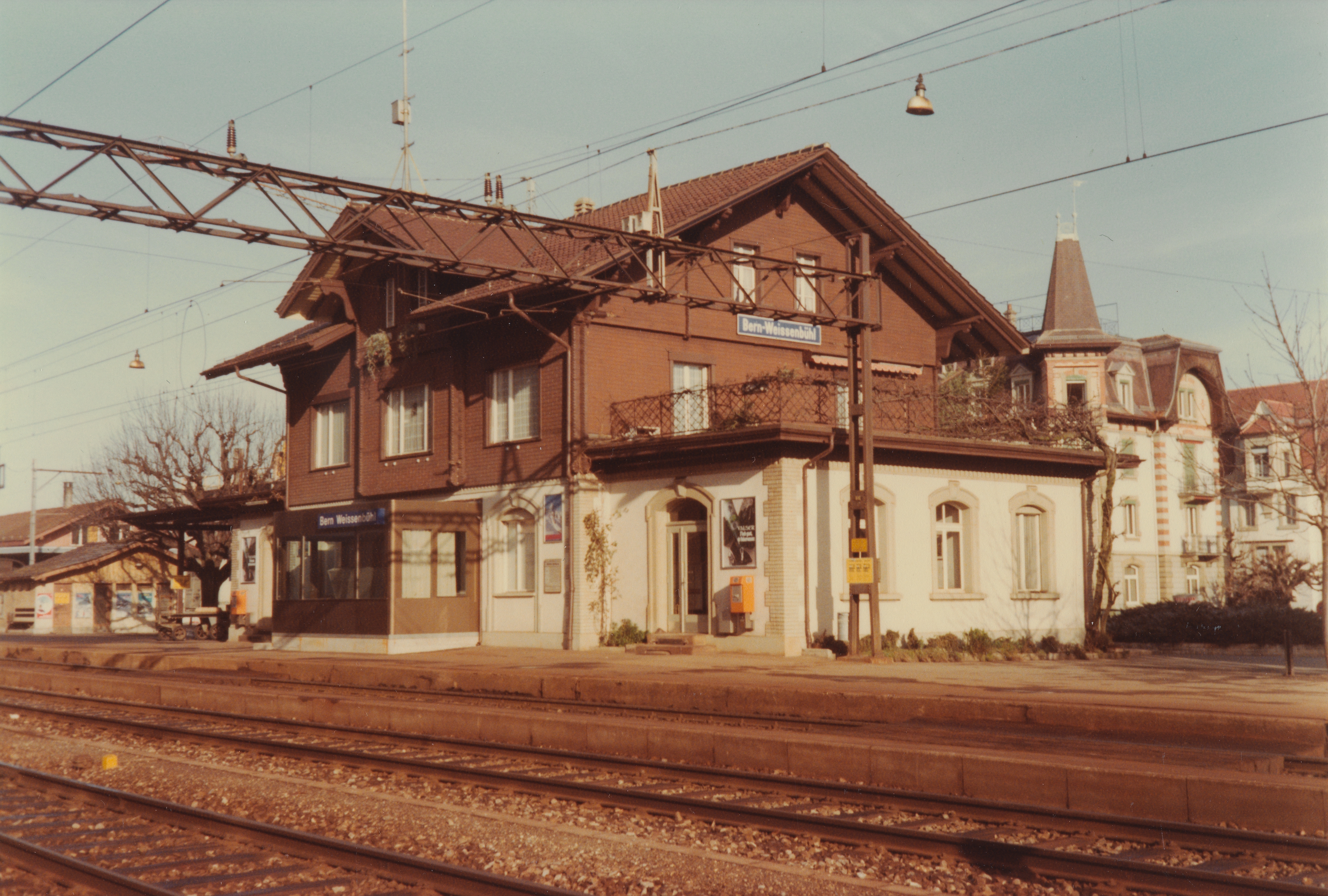
station building (1983)

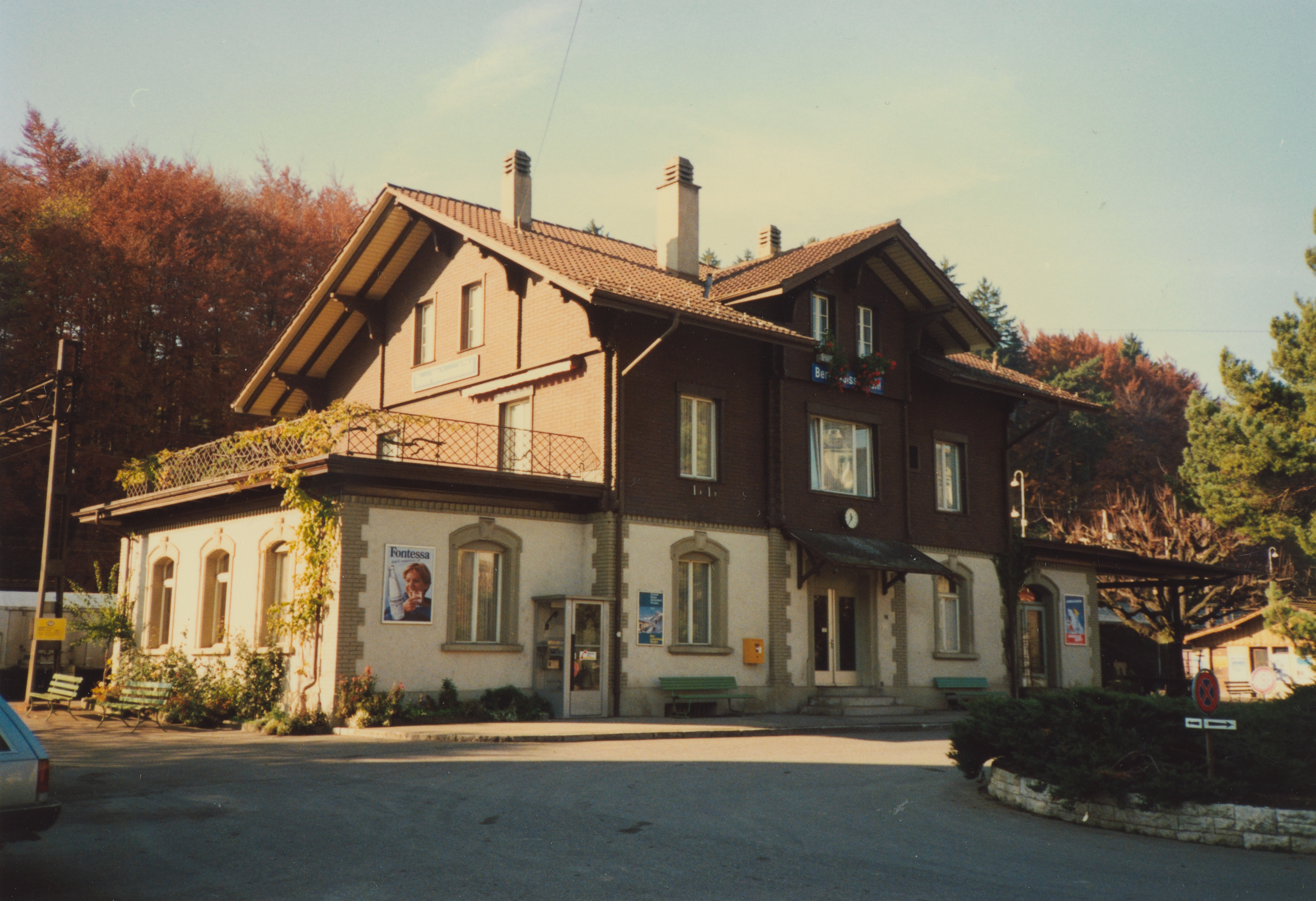
station building street side (1985)

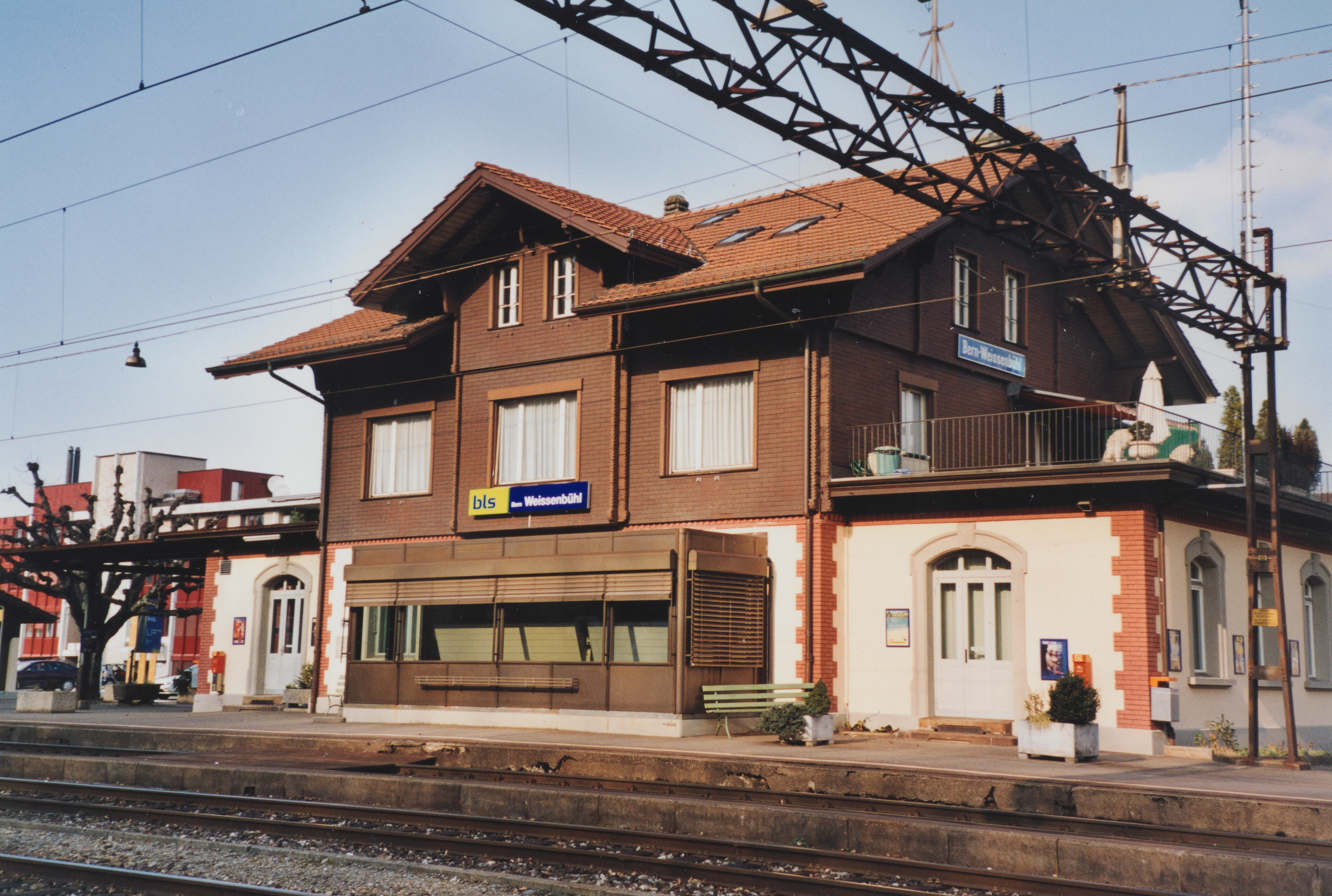
station building (2003)

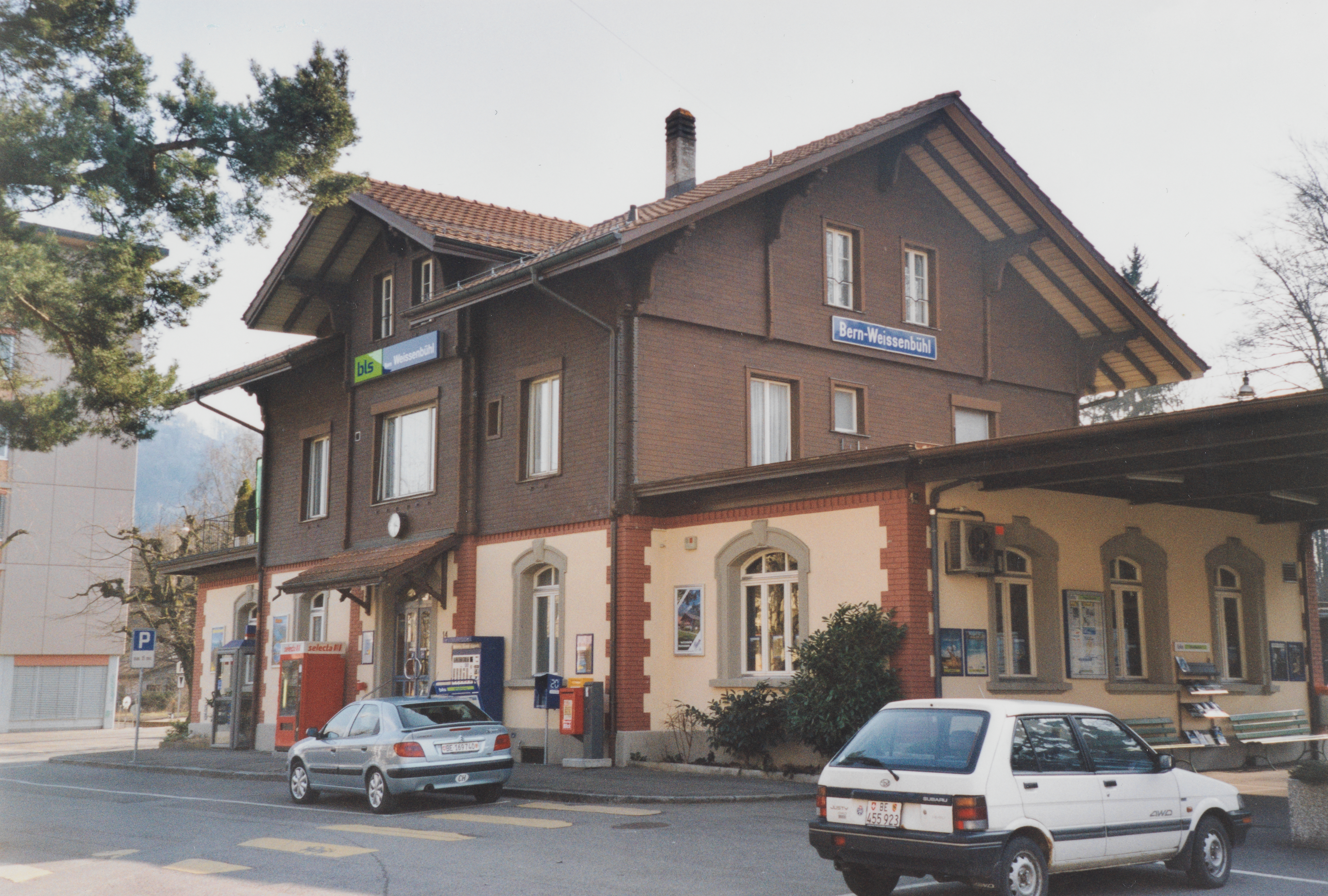
station building street side (2003)

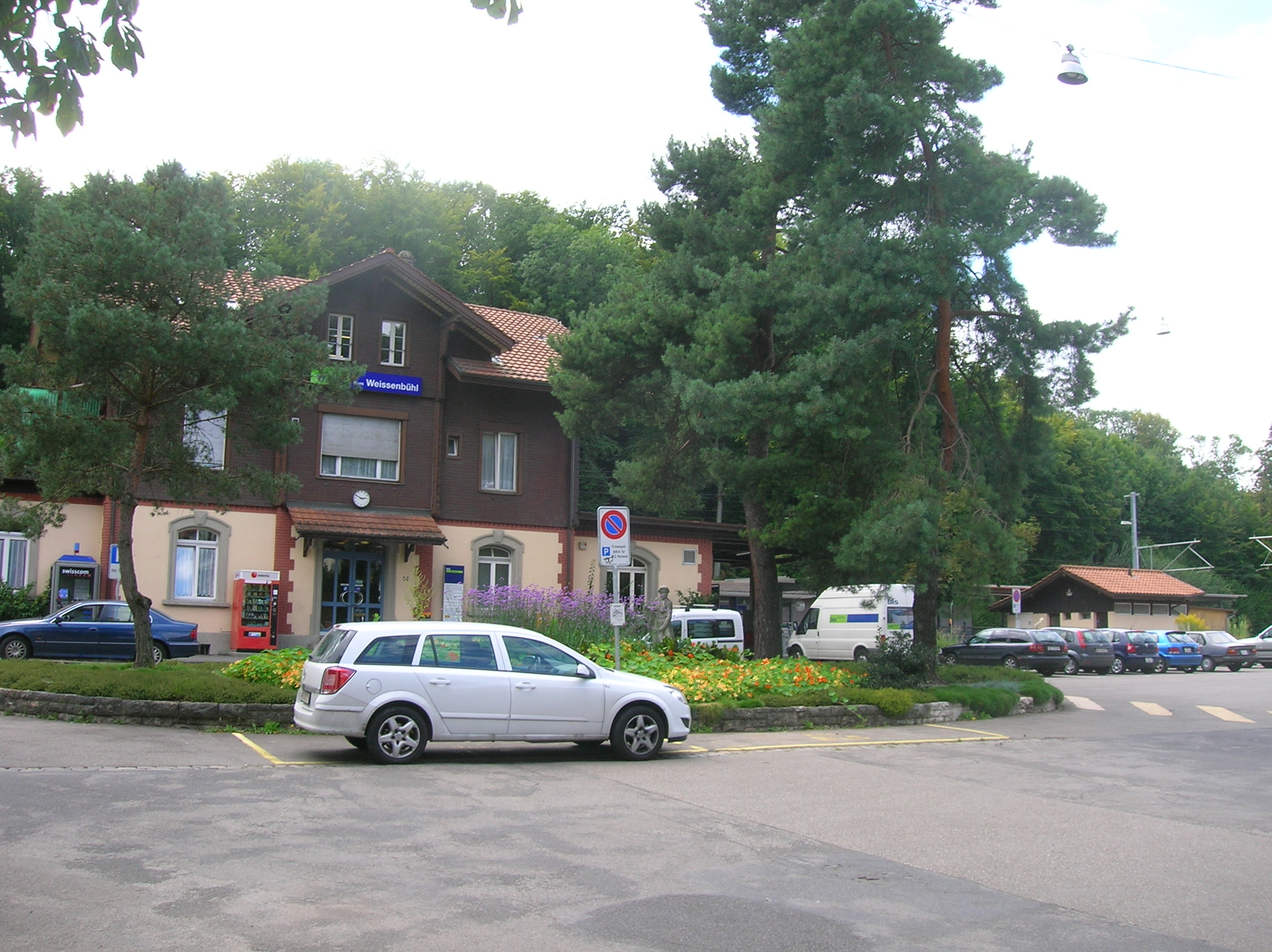
Südbahnhofstrasse at the station (2007)
