= Bern Bümpliz Süd railway station =

Railway station in Bern, Switzerland

Bern Bümpliz Süd
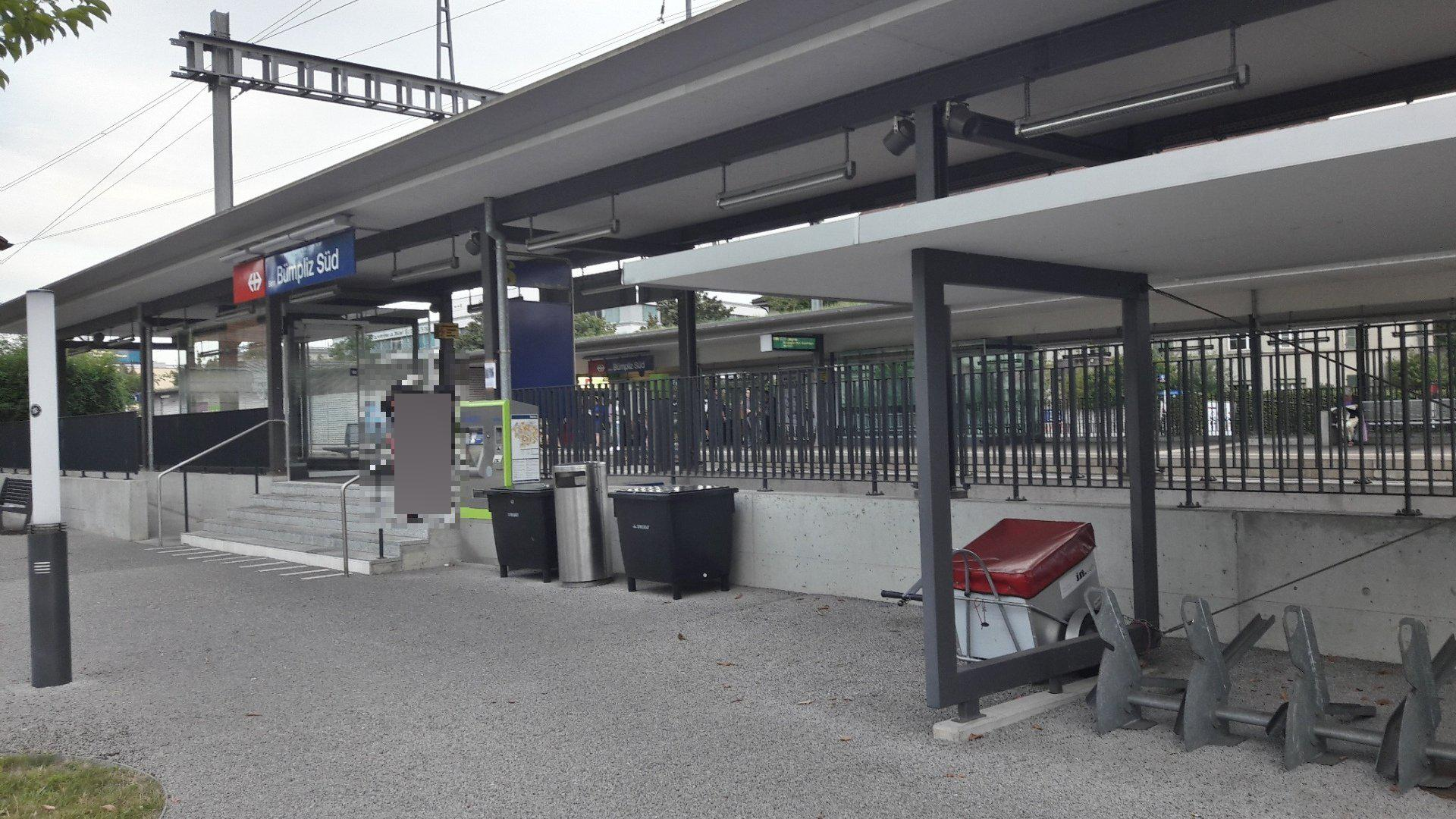
- The station in 2018

General information
- Location: Bern; Switzerland
- Coordinates: 46°56′15″N 7°23′43″E
- Elevation: 561 m (1,841 ft)
- Owner: Swiss Federal Railways
- Line: Lausanne–Bern line
- Distance: 93.0 km (57.8 mi) from Lausanne
- Platforms: 2 side platforms
- Tracks: 2
- Train operators: BLS AG
- Connections: BERNMOBIL buses

Construction
- Parking: Yes (32 spaces)
- Cycle facilities: Yes (66 spaces)
- Accessible: Yes

Other information
- Station code: 8504106 (BNBS)
- Fare zone: 101 (Libero)

Passengers
- 2023: 3'300 per weekday (BLS)

Services
Preceding station	Bern S-Bahn	Following station
Niederwangen towards Fribourg/Freiburg	S1	Bern Europaplatz towards Thun
Niederwangen towards Laupen BE	S2	Bern Europaplatz towards Langnau i.E.
Location

Bern Bümpliz Süd railway station (German: Bahnhof Bern Bümpliz Süd) is a railway station in the district of Bümpliz-Oberbottigen within the municipality of Bern, in the Swiss canton of Bern. It is an intermediate stop on the standard gauge Lausanne–Bern line of Swiss Federal Railways. Bern Bümpliz Nord railway station is located on the Bern–Neuchâtel line.

== Services ==
As of the December 2024 timetable change, the following services stop at Bern Bümpliz Süd:

- Bern S-Bahn:
  - S1: half-hourly service between Fribourg/Freiburg and Thun.
  - S2: half-hourly service between Laupen BE and Langnau.

== Gallery ==
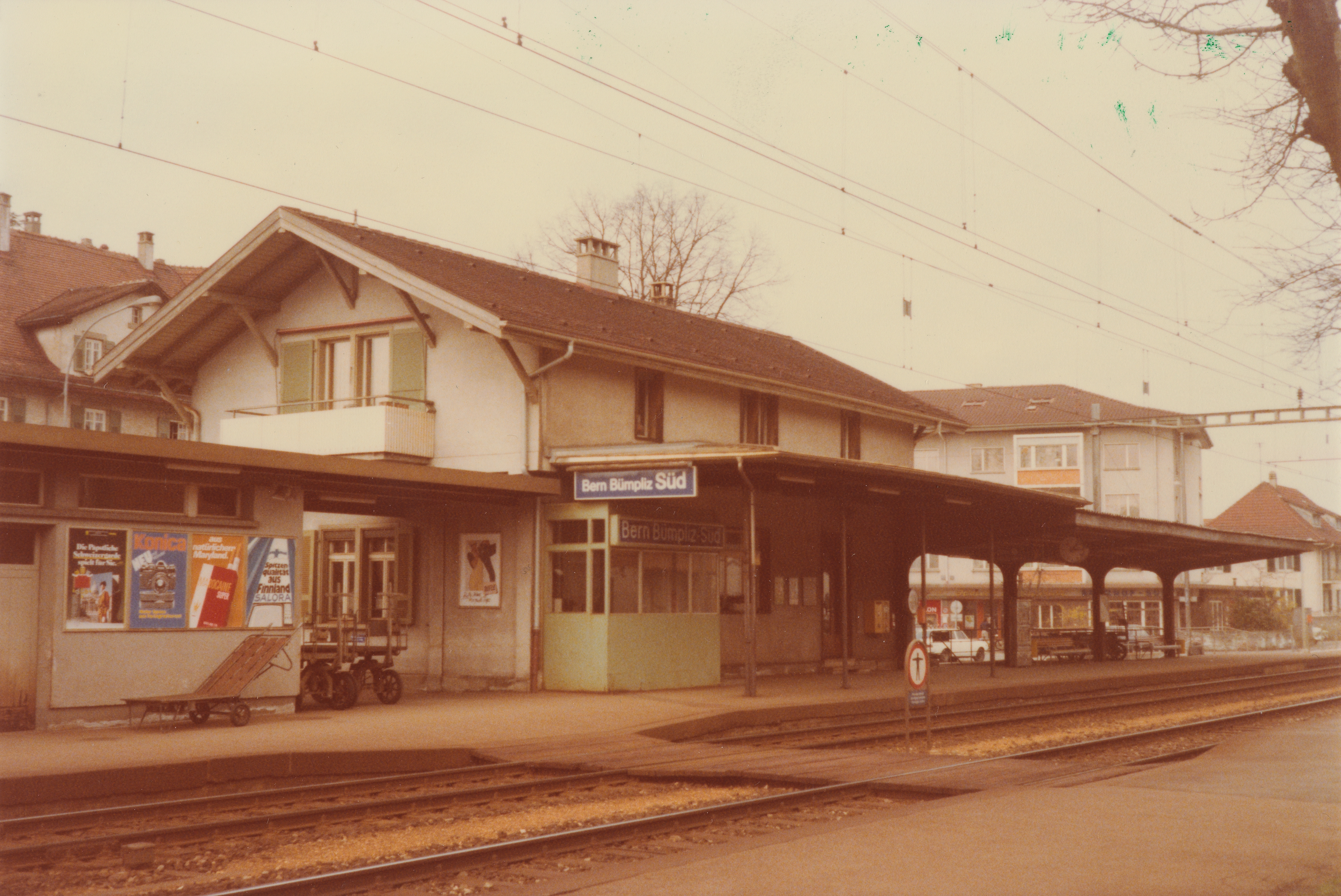
station building in 1979

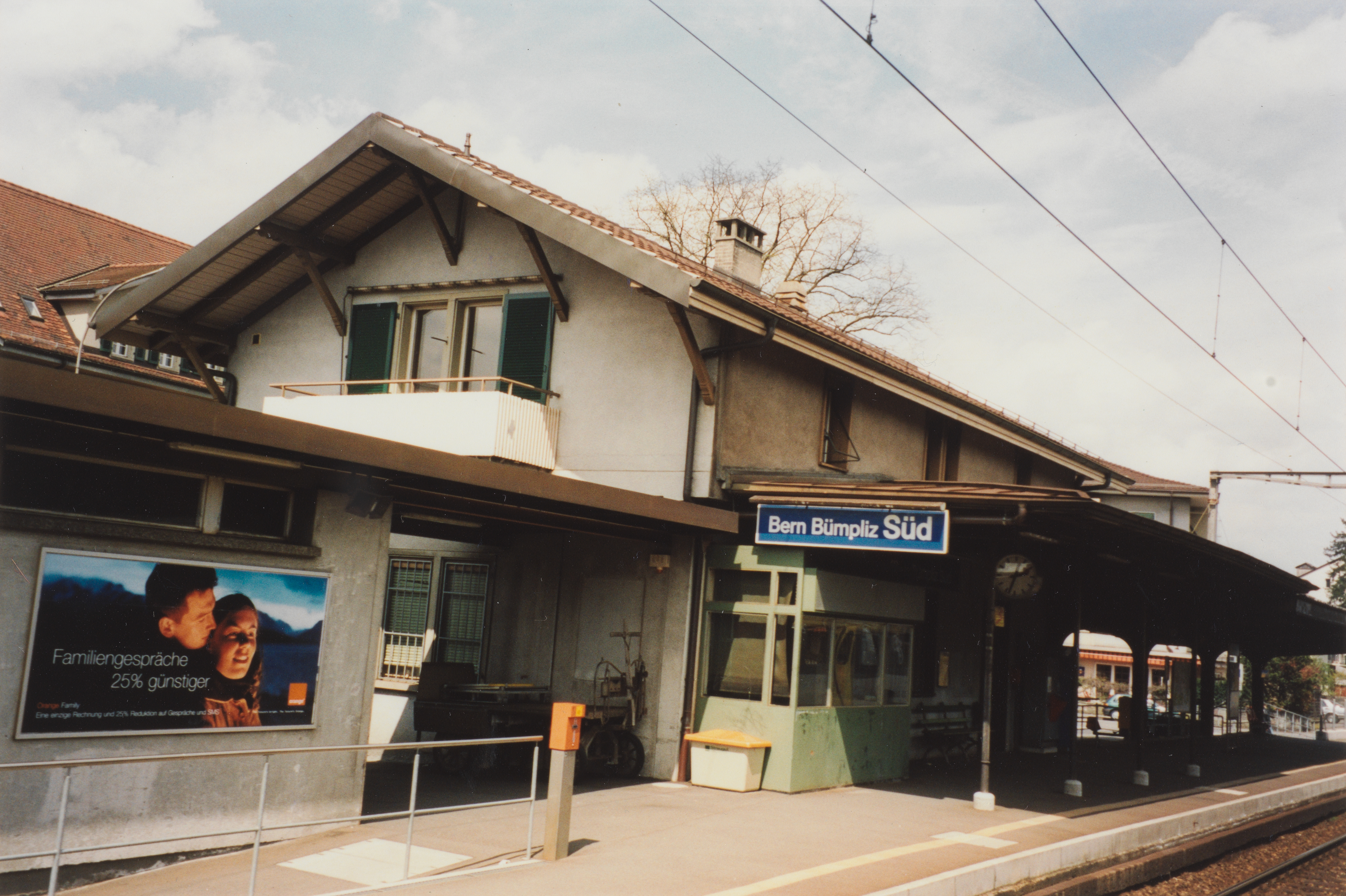
station building in 2001
