= South Campus =

South Campus or Campus South may refer to:

== Places ==
- South Campus station (disambiguation)
- South Campus Neighborhood, Chico, California, US
- Southside, Berkeley, California, US, a neighborhood also known as South Campus

== Education ==
- South Campus (University of Copenhagen), Denmark
- South Campus of University of Delhi, Moti Bagh, Delhi, India
- Banaras Hindu University, South campus, Uttar Pradesh, India
- Florida Community College South Campus, US
- South Campus of Pomona College, Claremont, California

== Other uses ==
- Staten Island University Hospital South Campus (formerly Richmond Memorial Hospital) aka "South Campus"
