= Wabern bei Bern =

Village in the municipality of Köniz in the Swiss canton of Bern

Coordinates: 46.928696°N 7.448387°E

Aerial view(1967)

Wabern (Swiss Standard German pronunciation: [ˈvaːbərn]), or Wabern bei Bern (pronounced [ˈvaːbərn baɪ ˈbɛrn], lit. 'Wabern near Bern'), is a village in the municipality of Köniz in the Swiss canton of Bern. Situated some 3.5 kilometres (2.2 mi) from the centre of the city of Bern, it can be considered a suburb of that city.

Wabern is served by Wabern bei Bern railway station, on line S3 of the Bern S-Bahn, and by Bern tramway route 9. It is also the gateway to the Gurten, the nearest mountain to Bern, to which it is linked by the Gurten Funicular.
