= Trams in Bern =

Network of tramways in Bern

Coordinates: 46°56′51″N 7°26′26″E

Bern tramway network
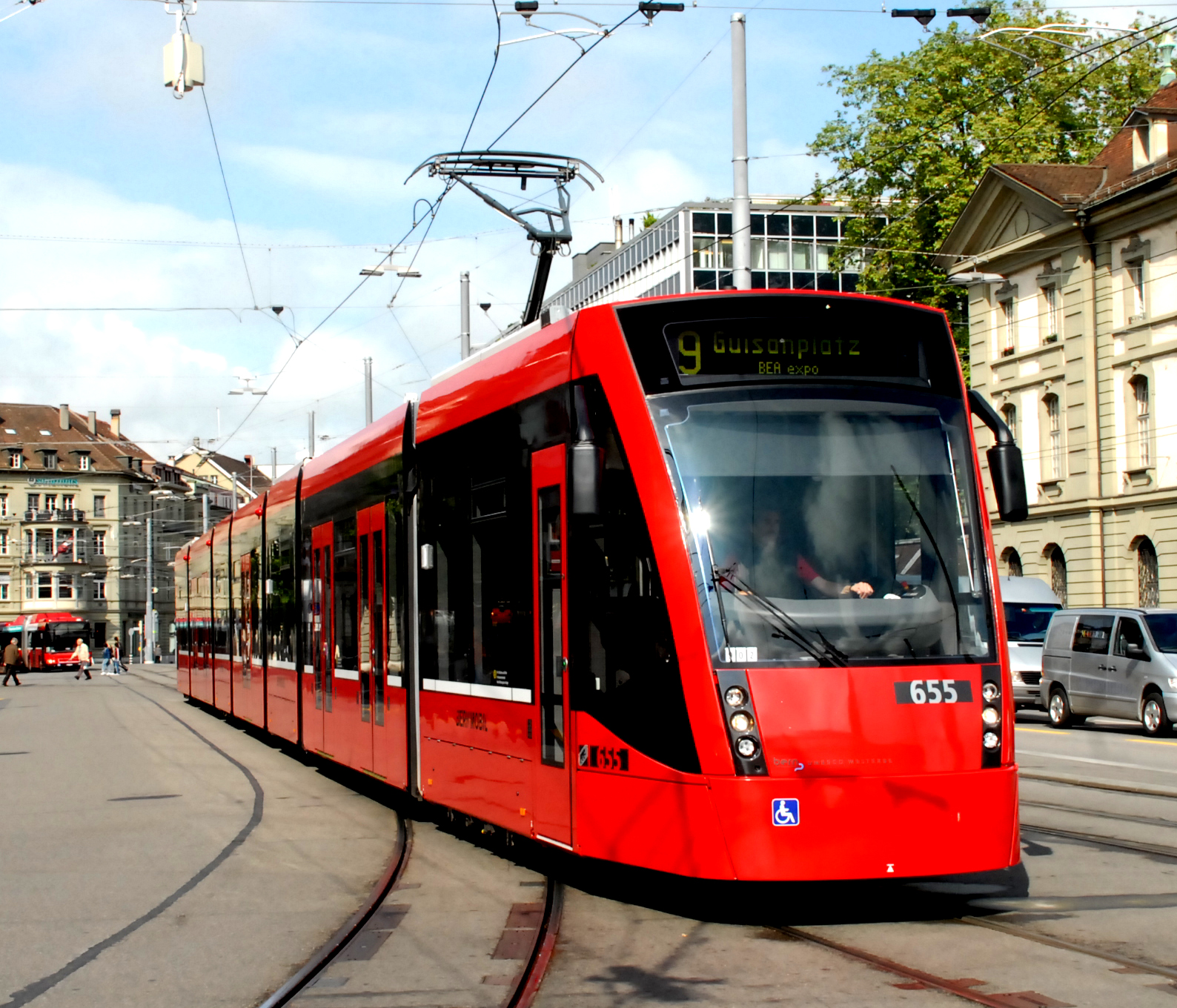
- A Siemens Combino tram in Bern, 2010.

Operation
- Locale: Bern, Switzerland]

Statistics
Pneumatic/steam era: 1890–1902
- Track gauge: 1,000 mm (3 ft 3 3/8 in) metre gauge
- Propulsion system: Pneumatic / Steam
Electric tram era: since 1901
- System: Libero (since 2004)
- Status: Operational
- Routes: 5
- Operator: Bernmobil (since 2000)
- Track gauge: 1,000 mm (3 ft 3 3/8 in)
- Propulsion system: Electricity
- Electrification: 600 V DC
- Route length: 33.4 km (20.8 mi)
- Stops: 71
- 2011: 45.9 million
- Website: http://www.bernmobil.ch Bernmobil (in German)
Overview

The Bern tramway network (German: Berner Strassenbahn-Netz) is a network of tramways forming part of the public transport system in Bern, the capital city of Switzerland. In operation since 1890, it presently has five lines, one of which incorporates the Bern–Worb Dorf railway.

The trams on the network run on 1,000 mm (3 ft 3 3/8 in) metre gauge track. Initially, they were powered by compressed air, but from 1894, the air trams were supplemented by steam trams. Since 1901, the trams have been powered by electricity, at 600 V DC.

The network is operated by a public transport corporation, the Städtische Verkehrsbetriebe Bern (SVB), which, since 2000, has marketed itself mainly under the trading name Bernmobil. The SVB also operates most of Bern's motor buses, and the Bern trolleybus system. Like the other public transport services in the region, the tramway network is part of the Libero-Tarifverbund, which is equivalent to a passenger transport executive or transit district.

== History ==
=== Pneumatic trams ===
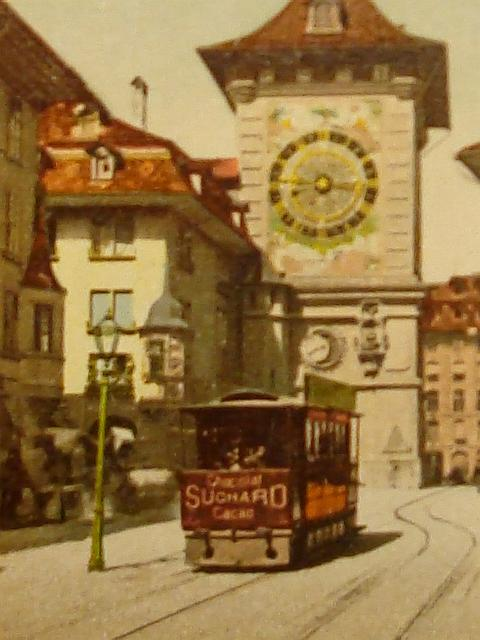
The Lufttram in a hand coloured postcard.

On 18 July 1889, the Eidgenössische Amt für Verkehr (Confederate Office of Transport) (EAV) granted the Berner Tramway-Gesellschaft (Bernese Tramway Company) (BTG) an 80-year concession for the operation of tramways in Bern.

Construction of a tramway began immediately, and the first line was opened on 1 October 1890.

Services were operated by compressed air-powered vehicles, known colloquially as Lufttrams (air trams), according to the system developed by the Parisian engineer Louis Mékarski.

The first line, designated as line I, ran from the Bärengraben (bear pits), which was also the location of the depot, to the Bremgartenfriedhof, via Bern railway station. At each terminus, there was a turntable to turn the vehicles.

During the winter months, the compressed air pipes often froze, and this would lead to several days of service interruptions.

=== Steam tramway ===
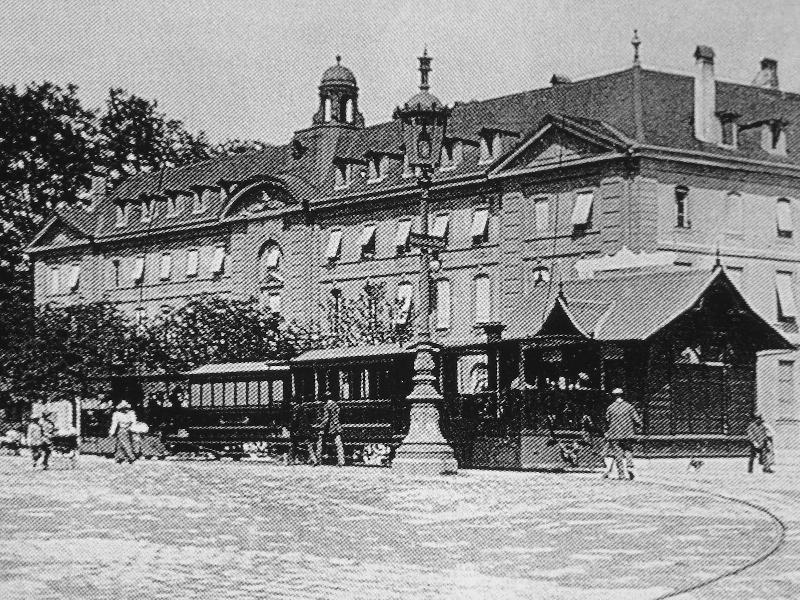
Two steam trams in front of the Burgerspital.

In light of the problems the BTG was experiencing with operating the pneumatic trams, and also Bern's challenging topography, the residents of the city voted in favour of using steam trams to operate line II. This line, opened in 1894, ran from Länggasse to Wabern, via the railway station, the Mattenhofquartier (Eigerplatz) and Weissenbühl.

The depot for the steam trams was in the Mattenhofquartier. Bern's main tram depot is still located there.

The new steam tram line ousted Bern's horse-drawn omnibuses from the city centre; from then onwards, the omnibuses operated a new connection from Wabern to Belp-Steinbach. Meanwhile, plans were developed to extend the steam tramway to Kehrsatz and Belp.

A coalition of political and economic interests in various neighbouring communities then vehemently campaigned for the construction of a steam-driven interurban tramway from Bern to Worb. Such a tramway would allow connections at Gümligen with the standard gauge railways to Bern, Thun and Emmental. The BTG assisted with planning and cost calculations, and applied on behalf of the coalition for the required concession, which was issued by the EAV on 23 December 1896.

The opening of the 9.7 km (6.0 mi) long Bern to Worb tramway took place on 21 October 1898. From then until 31 March 1904, the Bern-Worb-Bahn (BWB) was operated by the BTG.

=== Electrification ===
The development of urban tramway networks in Switzerland and abroad at around the turn of the 20th century did not go unnoticed in Bern. A third line was planned for the Bern tramway network at that time, and it was intended to operate that line by electricity from the outset. Electrification of the two existing lines was planned to follow. There was opposition to the construction of overhead catenary, mainly from the residents of Kirchenfeld on the other side of the Aare. But at the ballot box, the electrification plans received the go ahead. Equally as unsuccessful as the opposition to electrification was a simultaneous popular initiative for the retention of the Lufttrams on line I.

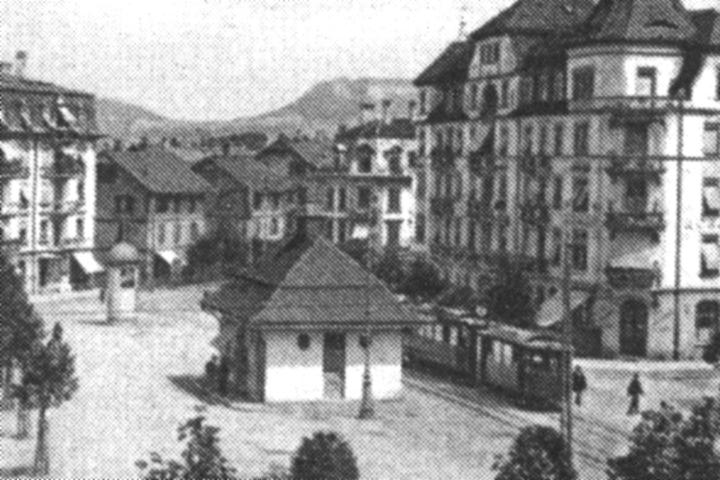
The Läbchueche-Hüsli station building in Breitenrainplatz at the start of the 20th century.

On 1 July 1901, services commenced on line III. This led from Breitenrain to Burgernziel via the Zytglogge. For four and a half months, Bern had three types of tram traction at the same time. The opening of the Gürbetalbahn enabled the replacement of the city's horse-drawn omnibus services. On the other hand, plans for the extension of line II were abandoned. The last day of operation of the pneumatic trams was 15 November 1901. None of the pneumatically powered vehicles have been preserved, but the old Depot and a bus shelter at the Bärengraben continue to remind Bernese residents today of the Lufttram era. The Bärengraben depot was abandoned and sold three years later.

In time for the winter of 1901-1902, the Burgernziel depot, which also still exists today, was able to be completed. Electric operations on line II were taken up on 29 January 1902. For that purpose, 24 two-axle and seven Maximum-bogied motor tramcars, as well as the twelve former steam tram trailers, were available. The SSB remained the only Swiss tram company that bought the Maximum-bogied tramcars. In the course of 1902, the SSB also retrained the horse tram drivers from the city of Biel/Bienne as electric tram drivers, so that in the new year of 1903 a smooth transition could be made to the new form of traction.

In the summer of 1904, eight short open tram trailer cars were added to the fleet. They rapidly came to enjoy great popularity. Unexpectedly, damage to the chassis frame occurred on two of the motor tramcars used to haul the open trailers, which operated mostly on line I. The damage was obviously caused by the Demerbe rails used on that line, and the SSB was forced to replace the two tramcars much earlier than planned. At the end of 1905 came the first six axle enclosed tram trailer. Between 1906 and 1914, 29 two-axle motor tramcars were commissioned in a number of separate deliveries. These new tramcars were stronger than their predecessors and were also no longer asymmetrical.

Bern's fourth tramway, line IV, was the first radial route in the Bern tramway network. It ran from the railway station to Brückfeld. Scheduled services on line IV commenced on 27 June 1908. To cater for the Eidgenössische Schützenfest 1910, line III had been extended during the preceding winter months to Papiermühlestrasse. In addition, four new two-axle tram trailers had been purchased. In 1909, more than ten million passengers travelled on Bern's trams for the first time.

In 1911, the SSB changed the routing of lines II, III and IV. The station was now the central interchange point. The line II trams ran from Weissenbühl to Papiermühlestrasse, those of line III from Länggasse to Burgernziel, and the trams on line IV from Wabern to Länggasse. With the opening of the Hirschengraben to Friedheim section through the Monbijou Quartier in 1912, the line IV trams could now run directly to Wabern without going through the Mattenhofquartier and Weissenbühl. Since then, the Weissenbühl Friedheim section has been a non-revenue track. At the same time, a new network came into operation. The lines were now given Arabic designators:

- Line 1 (opposite direction: line 2): Bärengraben – Bahnhof – Friedhof (former line I)
- Line 3 (opposite direction: line 4): Weissenbühl – Bahnhof – Papiermühlestrasse (former line II)
- Line 5 (opposite direction: line 6): Länggasse – Bahnhof – Burgernziel (former line III)
- Line 8 (opposite direction: line 9): Wabern – Friedheim – Bahnhof – Brückfeld (former line IV)

Trams that reversed at Friedheim, and therefore did not continue to Wabern, operated as line 7. The fleet of two-axle trailers was expanded by another seven units.

In 1913, the tramway sections in the Länggasse and to Brückfeld were converted into double track lines, in preparation for the Swiss National Exposition that was to be held in Bern the following year. During the Exposition, the SSB was responsible for the operation of the Rundbahn (circle of track) running through the exhibition grounds. To cope with the task of carrying Exposition visitors to and from the Exposition, the SSB also procured more two-axle trailers. These were the last two-axle vehicles to be acquired by the SSB, and for nearly two decades were also the SSB's newest trailers. Upon their entry into service, the size of the SSB's fleet was increased to a total of 60 motor cars and 54 trailer cars.

=== World War I ===
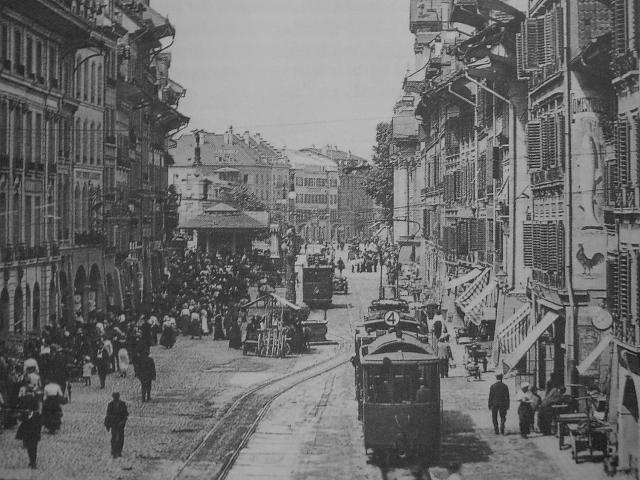
Spitalgasse, 1915: trams were still passing the Brunnen on only one side. In the background is the Heiliggeistkirche.

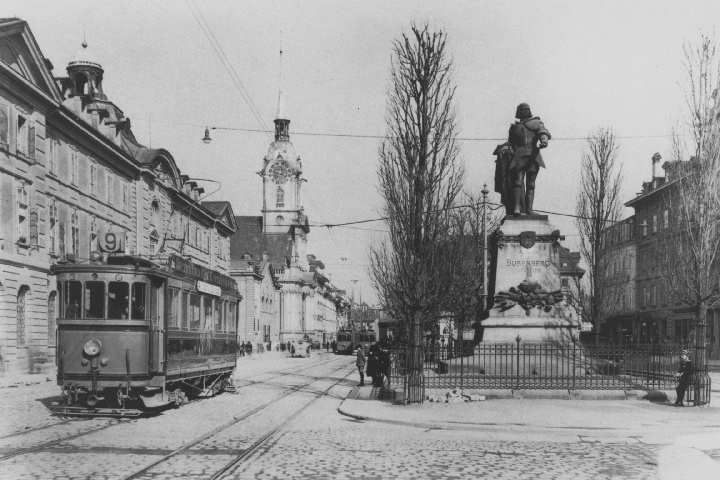
The Bubenbergplatz with the monument at its then location in 1915. At left is a motor tramcar of series Ce 2/4 (nos. 51 bis 57).

In the summer of 1914, tram traffic in Bern came to be affected by global politics, when the Federal Council ordered the general mobilization of the army effective from 2 August 1914. As a result, a total of 125 employees of the SSB went missing from all areas of its operations. This loss of available staff represented about 40 percent of a workforce of 319 people. To alleviate the personnel shortage, the company needed 144 Hilfskondukteure (assisting conductors). At that time, women were not allowed to be hired.

Meanwhile, to facilitate the extension of the Worblentalbahn (WT) from Papiermühlestrasse to the Kornhausplatz with effect from 19 July 1915, the spacing between the tracks had to be increased, initially in the curves, to avoid crossing prohibitions due to the greater width of the WT's vehicles. As World War I continued, the SSB was forced by inflationary increases in the price of coal imports to restrict its activities to the absolute minimum. The six Rundbahn motor cars, which, due to their low powered motors, had been used only as summer trailers, were converted to closed vehicles that could be used all year round. Three vehicles became trailers, and the tramcars that had actually been procured as summer trailers were sold to the Städtische Strassenbahn Zürich.

In the summer of 1918, the SSB helped out the Bern-Worb-Bahn on a number of Sundays, by lending tramcar combinations that were able to carry many day trippers despite the BWB's shortage of vehicles.

=== Interwar period ===
In 1919, the Bernese Gemeinderat debated the merits of two projects for the extension of the tram network. While the extension of line 1/2 from Bärengraben to Ostermundigen (with inclines at Aargauerstalden, Laubeggstrasse and Ostermundigenstrasse) was rejected for cost reasons, the Gemeinderat agreed to a line to Bümpliz. This line was compensation for the incorporation of Bümpliz into Bern.

After the war, the economic situation did not improve much at first. The SSB remained limited to only the most essential maintenance work. Nineteen twenty was the first year in the company's operating history to end in a deficit. In 1920 and 1921, a total of 65 people had to be laid off. The sale of surplus spare parts to the Lucerne tramway network brought in revenue of 700 Swiss francs.

Between 1921 and 1932, the summer tramcars were rebuilt in the SSB's own workshop into closed all-year-round trailers. Some vehicles were used as testbeds for various modifications until, with one exception, they were all fitted with the large round platforms that were typical for Bern.

In 1923, the network was extended once again for the first time in 15 years. With the commissioning of the branch line from the Effingerstrasse into Fischermätteli on 18 November 1923, the Bern tramway network reached a length of 18.2 km (11.3 mi). The branch line was the last new SSB line to be built for nearly a quarter of a century. The new line's introduction led to a slight change in the network's operations: trams now ran from Brückfeld into Fischermätteli (line 11; in the opposite direction, line 12). The line to Wabern became a radial route.

An application by the Bern–Worb-Bahn for permission to relocate its terminus from Helvetiaplatz to Casinoplatz (Hotelgasse) at the other (Bern) end of the Kirchenfeld Bridge was met with a negative response from the City of Bern: it feared that such a relocation would lead to a substantial deterioration of the traffic conditions on the edge of the inner city. Instead, the proposal started a political debate that extended over the following eight decades, until it was finally implemented in the late 1990s.

From 1924, trams made up of three tramcars were operated during rush hours for reasons of cost. In subsequent years, the SSB continued to incur no significant outgoings. Apart from the two extensions to Brückfeld and Wankdorf stadium, which operated only on special occasions, the main work the company performed on its tracks was maintenance work. As a search for cheap second hand tramcars in Germany, where the hyperinflation of 1923 had driven a number of tram operators into bankruptcy, did not produce the desired result, the company had to keep the 1901/02 vintage two axle motor tramcars in service by replacing the car bodies that had become rotten. Additionally, the Maximum motor tramcars were fitted with more powerful engines; the SSB thus hoped to extend their service life by 15 to 20 years. However, it was not possible to install track brakes in these cars, which is why they continued to operate mostly on line 3/4. From 1928, pantographs replaced the bow collectors with which the SSB tramcars had previously been fitted.

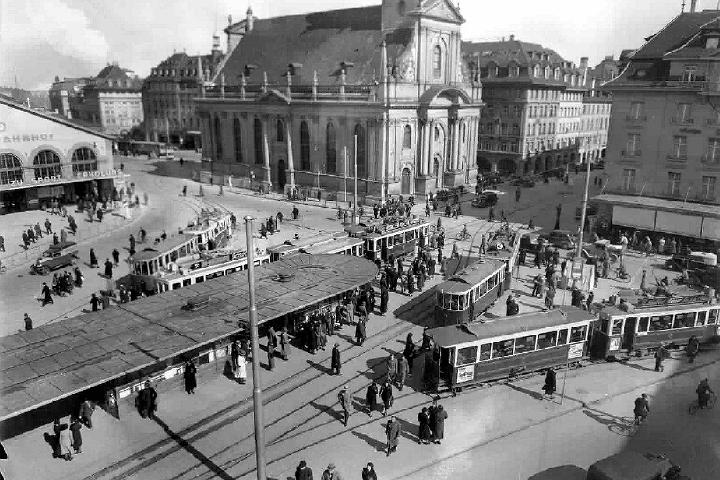
The Bahnhofplatz at the end of the 1930s.

Major renovation work carried out in 1930 in the Bahnhofplatz/Bubenbergplatz area changed not only the image of that part of the city, but also the line routes of the SSB. On the Bubenbergplatz, a large stabling area for trams (the "Blasermätteli") came into being. The station was robbed of its large entrance hall, and its front was moved to the back. The SSB took the opportunity to reorganise the network and introduced the coloured route panels still used in part today:

- Line 1/2 (blue): Friedhof – Bahnhof – Brückfeld
- Line 3/4 (white): Weissenbühl – Bahnhof – Papiermühlestrasse
- Line 5/6 (red): Länggasse – Bahnhof – Burgernziel
- Line 8/9 (yellow): Bärengraben – Bahnhof – Schönegg – Wabern (trams operating only as far as Schönegg ran as line 7)
- Line 11/12 (green): Bahnhof – Fischermätteli

In August of the same year, the SSB received its first new vehicles for 16 years. These were two four-axle motor tramcars of type Be 4/4.

In 1931, the SSB applied for a concession to extend line 5/6 by 800 m (2,600 ft) along the Muristrasse to Egghölzli. The cantonal authorities rejected this application, on the grounds that it could not accept responsibility for a double track section in the Muristrasse, with its heavy motor vehicle traffic. In 1932/1933, the "Landibahn trains" were permanently joined together in pairs with a gangway connection. From then onwards, they operated almost exclusively on line 11/12. In 1933, three new trailers were put into operation: two four-axle trams and one three-axle vehicle, each with an SLM-pony truck.

The first signs of the Great Depression were already being felt in Switzerland in 1932. Incomes declined more and more. In 1936, unemployment finally reached its peak. However, the SSB continued to carry out major work on its track system. At the same time, the SSB began to scrap the two-axle trailers from 1905 and 1910 and re-use parts of their chassis in the construction of new vehicles in its own workshop. The former steam tram trailers were gradually given new car bodies and boarded platforms. In December 1935, deliveries of seven four-axle motor tramcars began. This meant the end for the old Maximum motor cars. One survived until 1975 as a welding carriage.

The blackest day in the history of the network was 19 September 1936. At the Henkerbrünnli stop on line 1, fallen leaves lay on the wet rails. On the way back from a football match, a three tramcar combination operating a supplementary service skidded on the leaves, and then collided heavily with a stationary tram on a regularly scheduled service. A total of 28 passengers were injured, some seriously.

=== World War II ===
At the beginning of 1939, there was a flu epidemic that at times afflicted one fifth of the SSB's workforce. When the Federal Council finally proclaimed a general war mobilization in late summer that year, a large portion of the SSB's employees had to report for army duty, which caused numerous restrictions in the SSB's operations. Nevertheless, and for the first time ever, more than 20 million passengers travelled on the network tram in 1939.

As a result of the war, there was no celebration in 1940 of the 50th anniversary of trams in Bern. From 1941, the tramway network was fully double-tracked. In the next few years, restrictions of all kinds affected public transport in the federal city. As the war continued, shortages of materials made themselves felt. Passenger numbers rose sharply.

In 1944, the last vehicles with longitudinal bench seats entered service. These five four-axle motor tramcars and six four-axle trailer cars were also the last vehicles to be procured by the SSB. The motor tramcars were unusual, in that on one side there were modern air-operated folding doors, but on the other side only basic sliding doors were provided.

=== Postwar period ===
On 1 October 1944, the blackout was lifted after three years. Shortly after the war ended in 1945, SSB reintroduced the operation of trams at five-minute intervals. Voters approved the extension of line 5/6 from Burgernziel to Freudenbergerplatz (Ostring). This extension was ready to be opened on 1 December 1946.

As a result of the merger of the SSB with the bus company Stadt-Omnibus Bern (SOB) to form the Städtische Verkehrsbetriebe Bern (SVB) on 1 September 1947, there were changes in the routing of the tram lines, and a new uniform tariff for all urban transport. At the same time, separate numbering of routes according to the direction of tram travel was abandoned, in favour of the following line numbering scheme:

- Line 1: Güterbahnhof (formerly Friedhof) – Bahnhof – Brückfeld
- Line 3: Weissenbühl – Bahnhof
- Line 5: Länggasse – Bahnhof – Ostring
- Line 9: Wabern – Bahnhof – Militärplatz (formerly Papiermühlestrasse)
- Line 11: Fischermätteli – Bahnhof

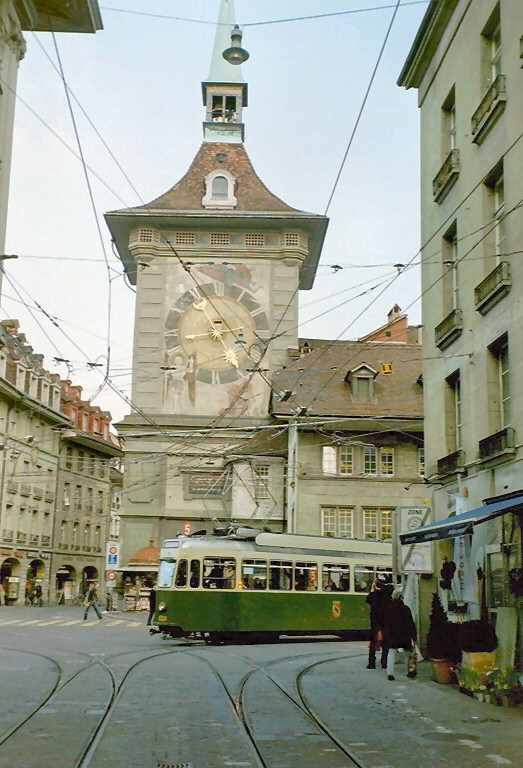
A Standard tramcar rounds a corner in front of the Zytglogge.

In autumn, the first ten Standard motor tramcars arrived. Five more joined the fleet the following spring. These were the first Bernese tramcars with passenger flow optimisation; the ticket inspector was allocated a reserved seat at the third door. Meanwhile, the renewal program for the older rolling stock renewal was continued. A planned takeover of trailers nos. 41 to 46 from the Biel/Bienne tramway network, which was closed in 1948, did not materialize, however, because agreement on price could not be reached. The new Bernese numbers 215-220 that had been intended for these cars were never allocated.

The incipient boom in the late 1940s brought an increase in motorized traffic. At the same time, the number of public transport passenger journeys declined steadily. The following year, the Lorraine and the Wyler lines were merged. In 1951/1952, the SVB received ten four-axle trailers. These were based on the (Swiss Standard Tram) proposed by the Association of Swiss Transport Institutions (VST) in 1945. Along with motor tramcars supplied four years earlier, these trailers could now be formed into trains of tramcars, and a large amount of older rolling stock therefore became surplus to requirements. At the Weissenbühl terminus, a car barn for 20 to 24 two-axle vehicle was constructed. The trams stored there formed the reserve for major events.

From 1952, the route of the Bümpliz line ran along the Effingerstrasse and no longer via the Laupenstrasse. This new route was introduced in view of the construction of a high-rise hospital building for the Inselspital. In the early summer of 1954, a traffic report by a Zürich consulting firm suggested the conversion of the entire Bernese tramway network to bus operation. The model for this was the then modern concept of the car-friendly city. This met with opposition from the Bernese population, including demonstrations in favour of retaining the trams. In 1955, work began on the reconstruction of the railway tracks in front of the Eigerplatz depot. Meanwhile, during renovations of the track on the Kirchenfeld Bridge, buses were used frequently to operate a rail replacement bus service to the Ostring.

In 1958, all of Bern's motor tramcars had to be fitted with blinkers. In November of the same year the SVB introduced new express routes from Hauptbahnhof to Militärplatz and from Hauptbahnhof to Ostring. Also in 1958, work began on the renovation of the railway station. As a direct result of the construction of the new Schanzen bridge, the Länggasse – Hauptbahnhof section was converted to motor bus operation. From then onwards, line 5 (formerly line 11) was operated as a Fischermätteli – Hauptbahnhof – Ostring cross-city line. Consequently, the "Landibahn" trains from 1914 lost its area of operation and could be withdrawn from service along with the last steam tram trailers. Additionally, the introduction of the second series of Standard trams (ten motor tramcars and ten trailers) led to the withdrawal of a large portion of the remaining two-axle vehicles. Ridership increased by up to six percent annually.

In 1964, Bern voters approved a general ban on smoking in buses and trams. This approval overrode earlier rules, such as the one stating that smoking is only allowed in the standing areas. With the conversion of Line 1 to motor bus operation on 11 October 1965, the track length of the tram network was reduced to 13.55 km (8.42 mi). This was also the last closure of a tramway in Bern. In the same year, the conversion of a Standard tram to driver-only operation marked the commencement of self-service ticket control, which was otherwise phased in gradually between 1967 and 1973. In August 1966, in view of the replacement of the old four-axle trams equipped with longitudinal benches, the SVB took delivery of a bi-articulated vehicle with four single axle bogies from SWS Schlieren on a trial basis. However, the trial of this vehicle did not lead to a series production order, as the SVB decided to acquire conventional eight-axle bi-articulated vehicles with Jacobs bogies instead.

=== Late twentieth century ===
From the winter of 1972/1973, the new bi-articulated vehicles were in service, mostly on line 9. This development enabled the withdrawal of the last two axled trams. The Maximum tramcar from 1902, which had been converted into a work car, was scrapped and replaced by another tramcar thirty years younger. By this means, the last representative of its type disappeared. On 28 October 1973, the 1.67 km (1.04 mi) long extension of line 3 from Burgernziel to the new suburb of Wittigkofen (Saali) went into operation.

With the opening on 26 May 1974 of the underground station on the Zollikofen–Bern railway, a station that also served trains from Solothurn and from Worb Dorf, an important revenue source for the city of Bern dried up. Previously, the Solothurn-Zollikofen-Bern-Bahn (SZB) and the Vereinigte Bern–Worb-Bahnen (VBW) had paid track access charges for the use of the infrastructure within the city limits. On 4 September 1976, as part of the big "Bernfest" marking the completion of a total of 17 years of rebuilding work at the station, the newly designed Bubenbergplatz was inaugurated. At the same time, the SVB presented to the public Switzerland's first dining car tram, developed from a motor tramcar with longitudinal seating and an accompanying trailer. Also in 1976, a section of line 9 in the Seftigenstrasse approximately 800 m (2,600 ft) long was moved to a reserved track section. This change made faster progress possible, especially during peak periods.

Due to the unexpectedly high passenger volume caused by the introduction of the "Bäreabi" in 1984, the mid-1980s was marred by an acute shortage of vehicles. The SVB therefore tried to find well-preserved used vehicles. Amongst the options considered were the acquisition of five Standard motor car/trailer combinations from Zürich, or the same number of Duewag trams from the Bielefeld Stadtbahn. Finally, five 40-year-old trailers were taken over in 1986 from Verkehrsbetriebe Zürich; these replaced the last six trailers with longitudinal seating. In 1987, with a view to the possibility of orders for new vehicles, there were guest appearances in Bern by a Geneva low-floor articulated tram and a high-floor Zürich tram of type Tram 2000. The Geneva low-floor tram was well received by the population, and this led to the procurement of twelve eight-axle vehicles in 1990.

In the summer of 1988, the closure of the Kirchenfeld Bridge to traffic for renovations led to a division of the tramway network. To allow operation on the eastern part, a provisional balloon loop was created at Helvetiaplatz and ran from there to Ostring and Saali. To connect the two sub-networks, two specially equipped bus lines 31 and 32 were operated. In 1990 twelve low-floor articulated tram trains entered service, and this made it possible to withdraw the old Zürich tramcars. Just three years later, and despite the withdrawal of these vehicles, the SVB bought other used trailers in Basel, and these were later onsold to Baselland Transport. Due to the bus replacement operations during the renovation of the Kornhaus Bridge additional buses from Baden-Wettingen and Lucerne also helped out.

At the end of the 1990s, a network optimization study suggested that the existing motorbus and trolleybus to Bümpliz, Bethlehem, Ostermundigen and Wyler be converted to tram operation by 2020.

=== Twenty-first century ===
On 17 June 2007, the voters of the canton of Bern approved the investment credit required for the suggested conversion. On 1 April 2008, construction work began on the new line, which is 6.8 km (4.2 mi) long. The new line begins at a junction at Kaufmännischer Verband, and proceeds to Bümpliz underpass, where it divides into line 7 to Bümpliz and line 8 to Brunnen. At the end of September 2010, the construction work was completed.

The new line was commissioned to coincide with the timetable change on 12 December 2010. Simultaneously, line G to Worb was renamed as line 6, and extended to Fischermätteli. Immediately before its renaming, line G had been the last of the lines in the Bernese transport network to be designated by a letter. The concession for this line was transferred to Bernmobil on 30 November 2010, a couple of weeks before the various network changes occurred.

== Lines ==
As of 2013, the lines of Bern's tramway network were as follows:

System map.

Line	Route	Type	stops	Length	Travel time
3	Bern Bahnhof – Weissenbühl	Radial route	7	2.067 km	9 / 8 minutes
6	Fischermätteli – Worb Dorf	Cross-city route	24	13.067 km	
7	Bümpliz – Ostring	Cross-city route	23	8.109 km	
8	Brünnen Westside Bahnhof – Saali	Cross-city route	27	10.383 km	
9	Wabern – Wankdorf Bahnhof	Cross-city route	21	5.958 km	

== Fleet ==
=== Current articulated trams ===
Type	Quantity	Fleet nos.	Built	Manufacturer
Be 4/10; Tram 2000; Owned by RBS	9	RBS 81–89	1987–1988 as Be 4/8, extended by Stadler in 2010	SWP / SIG / ABB
Be 4/8	12	731–742	1989–1990	Vevey / ABB / Duewag
Be 4/6; Combino Advanced	7	753–759	2002–2004	Siemens
Be 6/8; Combino Advanced	8	751, 752, 760–765	2002–2004 as Be 4/6, extended 2009	Siemens
Be 6/8; Combino Classic	21	651–671	2009–2010	Siemens
Tramlink	27	911–	2022–	Stadler

=== Withdrawn trams ===
Type	Quantity	Fleet nos.	Built	In service to	Manufacturer	Notes
Cm 2/2	10	1–10	1890	1901	Maschinenfabrik Bern	Pneumatic tram
G 3/3	8	11–18	1894	1901	SLM	Steam tram
Ce 2/2	24	1–24	1901–1902	1961	SWS / MFO	
Ce 2/4	7	51–57	1901–1902	1936	SIG / MFO	Maximum-Tram, from 1913 nos. 151–157
Ce 2/2	29	25–53	1906–1914	1973	SIG / MFO	
Ce 2/2	6	209–214	1914	1932	SWS / MFO	Open tram from the Landesausstellung (National Exhibition) of 1914
Ce 4/4	2	158–159	1930	1973	SIG / MFO	
Ce 2/4	3	160–162	1932–1933	1959	SWS / MFO	Permanently coupled pair, rebuilt from nos. 209–214
Ce 4/4	7	144–150	1935–1936	1976	SIG / MFO	
Be 4/4	5	171–175	1944	1973	SIG / MFO	"Lufter"
Be 4/4	15	101–115	1947–1948	1997	SWS / BBC / MFO	Swiss Standard Trams, from 1986 nos. 601–615
Be 4/4	10	121–130	1960–1961	2003	SWS / BBC / MFO	Swiss Standard Tram, from 1986 nos. 621–630. 9 trams sent to RATP Iași
Be 4/4	1	401	1966	1990	SWS / MFO	Nickname "Muni", articulated tram prototype, from 1986 no. 701
Be 8/8	16	711–726	1973	bis 2009	SWS / BBC	"SAC-Tram", to 1986 nos. 1–16. 14 trams sent to RATP Iași

=== Former trailer cars ===
Type	Quantity	Fleet nos.	Built	In service to	Manufacturer	Notes
C4	12	19–30	1894	1959	SIG	from 1901/04 nos. 71–79, from 1913 nos. 301–309
C2	8	101'–108'	1904	1935	SWS	Open tram, from 1913 nos. 201'–208', from the 1920s closed tram
C2	6	121'–126'	1905	1935	SWS	from 1913 nos. 221'–226'
C2	4	127–130	1910	1973	SWS	from 1913 nos. 227–230, combined order with Biel/Bienne trams 41–44
C2	7	131–137	1912	1973	SWS	from 1913 nos. 231–237
C2	20	238–257	1914	1973	SIG	
C2	8	201"–208"	1929–1934	1973	SWS / SSB	Made from various parts salvaged from nos. 201'–208'
C3	1	310	1933	1973	SWS / SLM	
C4	2	311–312	1933	1973	SIG	
C2	6	221"–226"	1935	1973	SWS / SSB	Made from various parts salvaged from nos. 221'–226'
C4	6	313–318	1944–1945	1988	SIG	"Babeli"
B4	10	321–330	1951–1952	2009	FFA	Standard Tram, 325, 326 and 330 sent to RATP Iași
B4	10	331–340	1960–1961	2005	SIG / SWS	Standard Tram
B4	5	341'–345	1945–1953	1992	SIG	formerly VBZ 711–713 and 718–719
B4	3	341"–343"	1947–1948	1998	FFA	formerly BVB 1402, 1403 and 1406

=== Heritage vehicles ===
Number	Owner	Place	Notes
12	Technorama	Bern, Eigerplatz	"Glettise"
18	Verkehrshaus	Lucerne, Verkehrshaus	"Glettise"
26	Verkehrshaus	Lucerne, Verkehrshaus	
31	BTG	Bern, Eigerplatz	Replica from 2002
37	SVB	Bern, Weissenbühl	
52	Blonay–Chamby Museum Railway	Chaulin, Museum	
107	SVB	Bern, Weissenbühl	
145	SVB	Bern, Weissenbühl	To December 2004 in service for the LOEB (DE) department store as a Märlitram (DE). Serves as Fondue-Tram in winter
171	SVB	Bern, Weissenbühl	formerly wheelchair tram, equipped with seating on only one side, "Lufter"
175	Amitram	Lille, Museum	in original condition, "Lufter"
204	SVB	Bern, Weissenbühl	
239	SVB	Bern, Weissenbühl	
311	SVB	Bern, Weissenbühl	Fondue-Tram in winter
302	Privat	Goumoens-le-Jux (VD)	Present number; chassis only, without bogies
312	SVB	Bern, Eigerplatz	
316	Amitram	Lille, Museum	"Lufter"
317	SVB	Bern, Weissenbühl	"Lufter"
337	SVB	Bern, Weissenbühl	
501	SVB	Bern, Weissenbühl	Snow blower Xe 2/2, originally owned by the city of Bern, unserviceable
502	Bahnmuseum Kerzers/Kallnach	Bern, Weissenbühl	Snow blower Xe 2/2, unserviceable
503	SVB	Bern, Weissenbühl	Welding tram Xe 4/4
621	SVB	Bern, Weissenbühl	formerly no. 121
647	SVB	Bern, Eigerplatz	formerly "Wagon-Restaurant" no. 147

== See also ==
- List of town tramway systems in Switzerland
