= Städtische Verkehrsbetriebe Bern =

Public transport operator in Bern, Switzerland

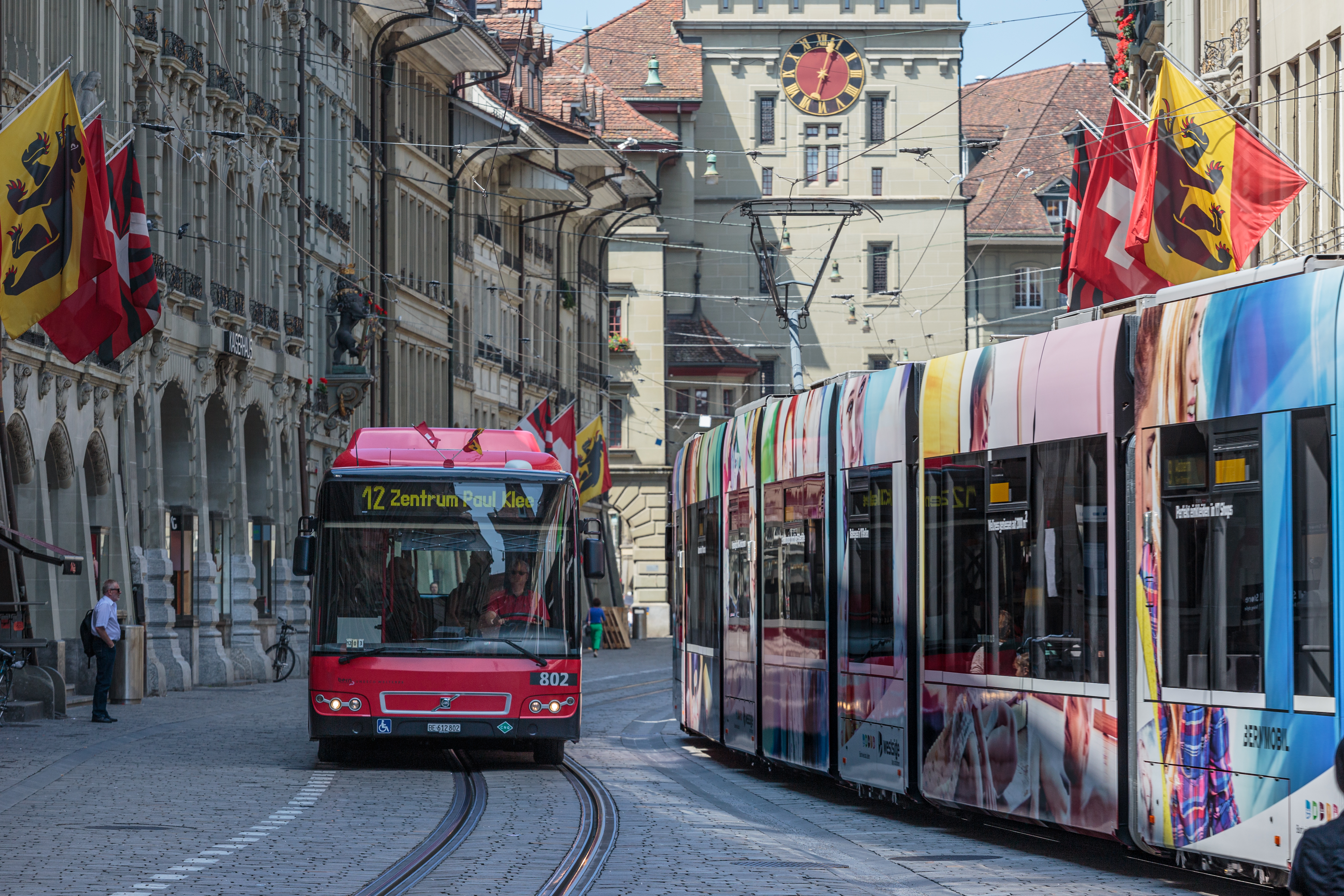
- Trade name: BERNMOBIL
- Industry: Transport
- Headquarters: Bern, Switzerland
- Area served: Bern

The Städtische Verkehrsbetriebe Bern (SVB) is a public transport operator in and around the Swiss capital city of Bern. It is also known by its marketing name of BERNMOBIL, and operates the city's network of trolleybuses, motor buses, and trams, including five existing tram lines and five historical tram lines. It was formed in 1947 by the merger of the Städtische Strassenbahn Bern (SSB), which operated trams and trolleybuses, with the Stadt-Omnibus Bern (SOB), which ran motor buses.

== See also ==
- Trams in Bern
- Trolleybuses in Bern
- Transport in Switzerland
