= Oberentfelden railway station =

Railway station in Switzerland

Oberentfelden
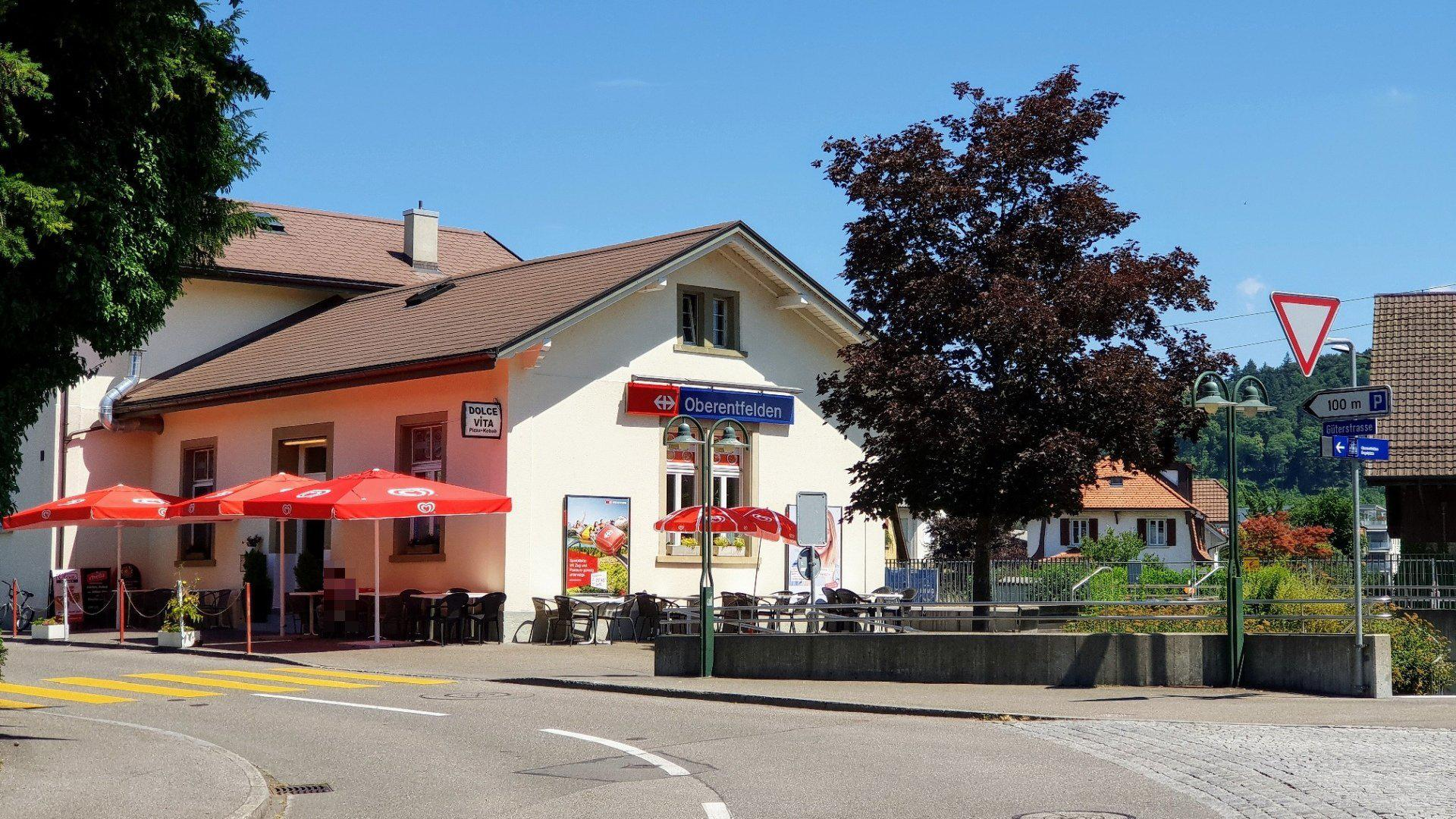
- The station building in 2018

General information
- Location: Oberentfelden; Switzerland
- Coordinates: 47°21′23″N 8°02′54″E
- Owner: Swiss Federal Railways
- Line: Zofingen–Wettingen line
- Distance: 13.6 km (8.5 mi) from Zofingen
- Train operators: Swiss Federal Railways

Passengers
- 2018: 1,000 per weekday

Services
Preceding station	Aargau S-Bahn	Following station
Kölliken towards Zofingen	S28	Suhr towards Lenzburg
Location
- Location within Switzerland Location within Canton of Aargau

Oberentfelden railway station (German: Bahnhof Oberentfelden) is a railway station in the municipality of Oberentfelden, in the Swiss canton of Aargau. It is an intermediate stop on the standard gauge Zofingen–Wettingen line of Swiss Federal Railways. The station is located some 180 metres (590 ft) from Oberentfelden Engelplatz on the 1,000 mm (3 ft 3 3/8 in) gauge Aarau–Schöftland line of Aargau Verkehr.

== Services ==
The following services stop at Oberentfelden:

- Aargau S-Bahn S28: half-hourly service between Zofingen and Lenzburg.
