= Kölliken Oberdorf railway station =

Railway station in Switzerland

Kölliken Oberdorf
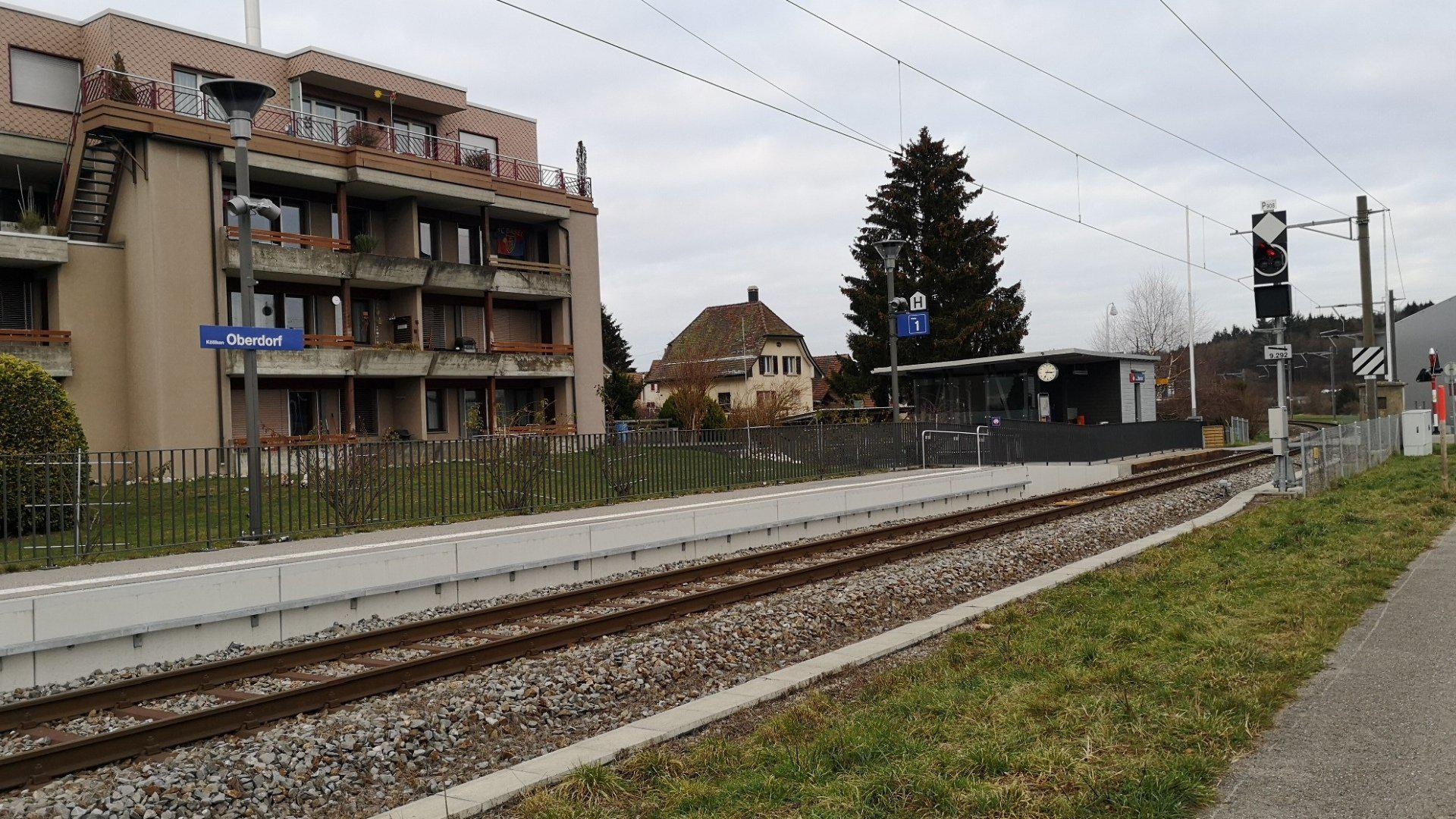
- The station in 2018

General information
- Location: Kölliken; Switzerland
- Coordinates: 47°19′29″N 8°01′09″E
- Owner: Swiss Federal Railways
- Line: Zofingen–Wettingen line
- Distance: 9.3 km (5.8 mi) from Zofingen
- Train operators: Swiss Federal Railways

Passengers
- 2018: 250 per weekday

Services
Preceding station	Aargau S-Bahn	Following station
Safenwil towards Zofingen	S28	Kölliken towards Lenzburg
Location
- Location within Switzerland Location within Canton of Aargau

Kölliken Oberdorf railway station (German: Bahnhof Kölliken Oberdorf) is a railway station in the municipality of Kölliken, in the Swiss canton of Aargau. It is an intermediate stop on the standard gauge Zofingen–Wettingen line of Swiss Federal Railways.

== Services ==
The following services stop at Kölliken Oberdorf:

- Aargau S-Bahn S28: half-hourly service between Zofingen and Lenzburg.
