= Bern Riedbach railway station =

Railway station in Bern, Switzerland

Bern Riedbach
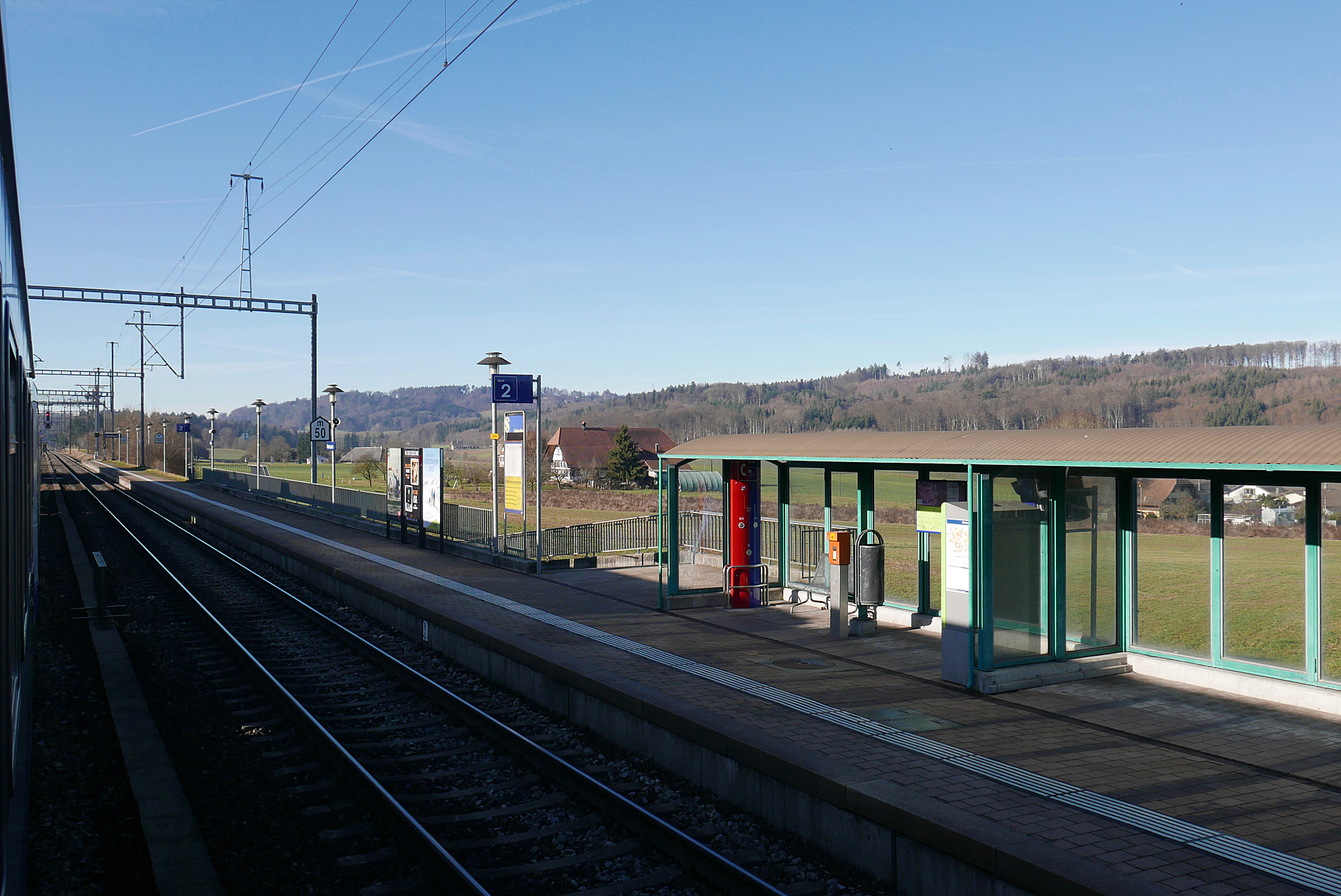
- The station platform in 2016

General information
- Location: Bern; Switzerland
- Coordinates: 46°56′28″N 7°20′03″E
- Elevation: 568 m (1,864 ft)
- Owner: BLS AG
- Line: Bern–Neuchâtel line
- Distance: 8.5 km (5.3 mi) from Bern
- Platforms: 2 side platforms
- Tracks: 2
- Train operators: BLS AG
- Connections: BERNMOBIL bus lines

Construction
- Parking: Yes (17 spaces)
- Accessible: No

Other information
- Station code: 8504488 (RCH)
- Fare zone: 101 and 112 (Libero)

Passengers
- 2023: 210 per weekday (BLS)

Services
Preceding station	Bern S-Bahn	Following station
Rosshäusern towards Murten/Morat, Payerne or Ins	S52	Bern Brünnen Westside towards Bern
Location

Bern Riedbach railway station (German: Bahnhof Bern Riedbach) is a railway station in the municipality of Bern, in the Swiss canton of Bern. It is an intermediate stop on the standard gauge Bern–Neuchâtel line of BLS AG.

== Services ==
As of the December 2024 timetable change, the following services stop at Bern Riedbach:

- Bern S-Bahn S52: hourly service between Bern and Murten/Morat; rush-hour trains on weekdays continue from Kerzers to Ins and from Murten/Morat to Payerne.
