= Safenwil railway station =

Railway station in Switzerland

Safenwil
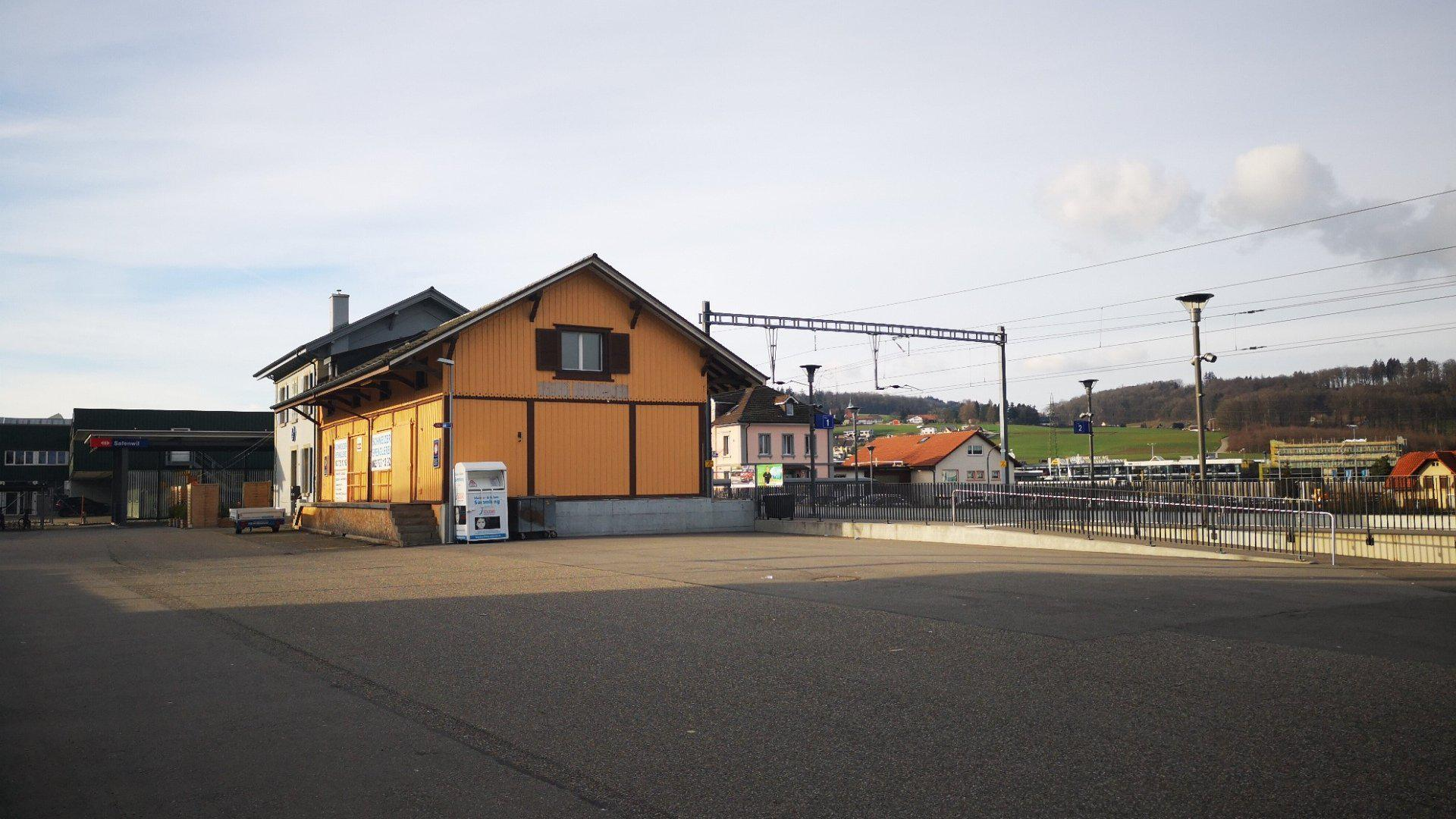
- The freight building in 2018

General information
- Location: Safenwil; Switzerland
- Coordinates: 47°19′18″N 7°59′01″E
- Owner: Swiss Federal Railways
- Line: Zofingen–Wettingen line
- Distance: 6.6 km (4.1 mi) from Zofingen
- Train operators: Swiss Federal Railways

Passengers
- 2018: 800 per weekday

Services
Preceding station	Aargau S-Bahn	Following station
Walterswil-Striegel towards Zofingen	S28	Kölliken Oberdorf towards Lenzburg
Location
- Location within Switzerland Location within Canton of Aargau

Safenwil railway station (German: Bahnhof Safenwil) is a railway station in the municipality of Safenwil, in the Swiss canton of Aargau. It is an intermediate stop on the standard gauge Zofingen–Wettingen line of Swiss Federal Railways.

== Services ==
The following services stop at Safenwil:

- Aargau S-Bahn S28: half-hourly service between Zofingen and Lenzburg.
