= Rosshäusern railway station =

Railway station in Mühleberg, Switzerland

Rosshäusern
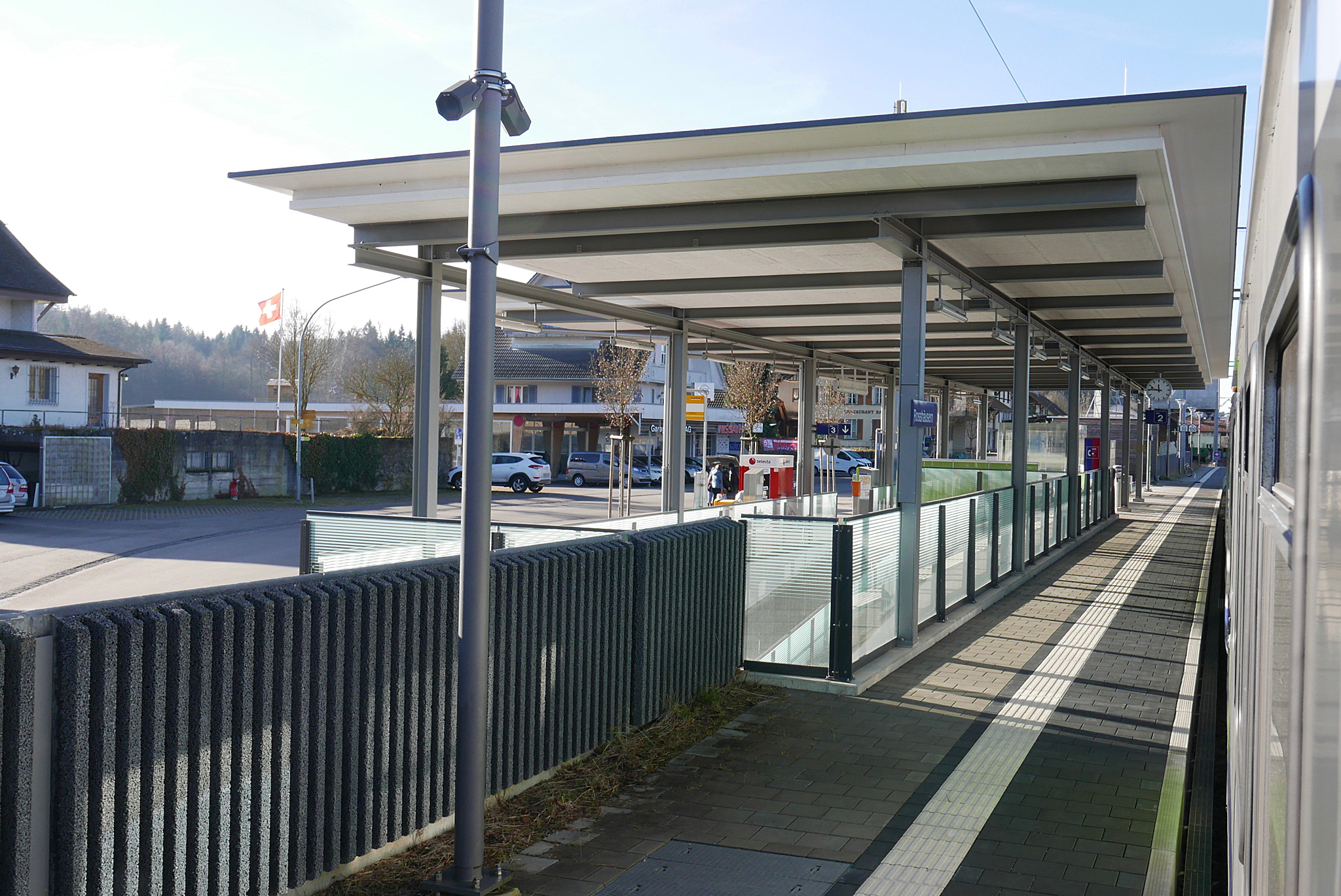
- The station platform in 2016

General information
- Location: Mühleberg; Switzerland
- Coordinates: 46°56′04″N 7°17′49″E
- Elevation: 579 m (1,900 ft)
- Owner: BLS AG
- Line: Bern–Neuchâtel line
- Distance: 11.5 km (7.1 mi) from Bern
- Platforms: 2 side platforms
- Tracks: 2
- Train operators: BLS AG
- Connections: PostAuto AG bus line

Construction
- Parking: Yes (20 spaces)
- Accessible: Yes

Other information
- Station code: 8504487 (ROSS)
- Fare zone: 177 and 699 (Libero)

Passengers
- 2023: 320 per weekday (BLS)

Services
Preceding station	Bern S-Bahn	Following station
Gümmenen towards Neuchâtel or Avenches	S5	Bern Brünnen Westside towards Bern
Gümmenen towards Murten/Morat, Payerne or Ins	S52	Bern Riedbach towards Bern
Location

Rosshäusern railway station (German: Bahnhof Rosshäusern) is a railway station in the municipality of Mühleberg, in the Swiss canton of Bern. It is an intermediate stop on the standard gauge Bern–Neuchâtel line of BLS AG.

== Services ==
As of the December 2024 timetable change, the following services stop at Rosshäusern:

- Bern S-Bahn:
  - S5: hourly service between Bern and Neuchâtel or Avenches; the train splits at Kerzers.
  - S52: hourly service between Bern and Murten/Morat; rush-hour trains on weekdays continue from Kerzers to Ins and from Murten/Morat to Payerne.
