= Walterswil-Striegel railway station =

Railway station in Switzerland

Walterswil-Striegel
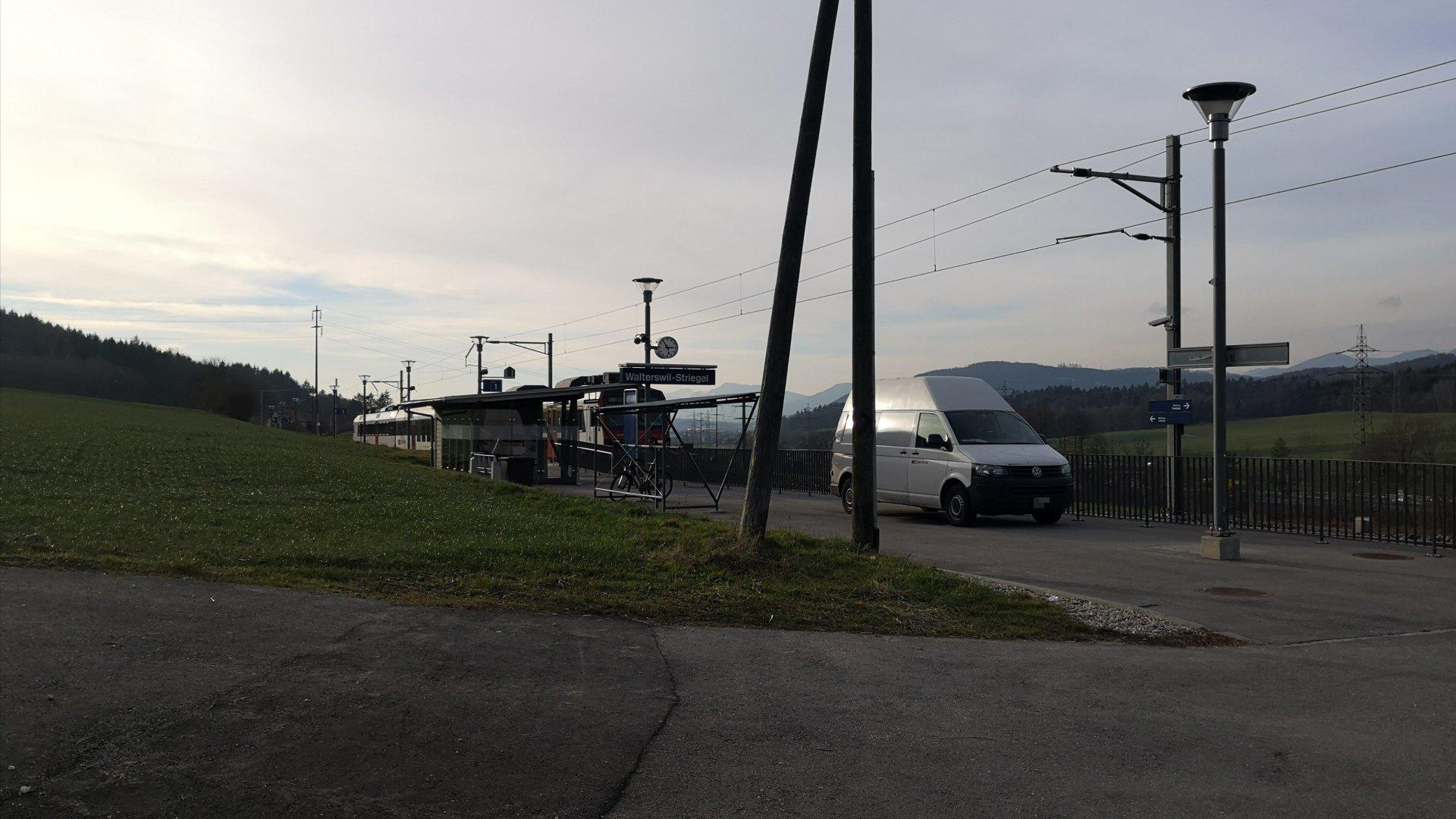
- The station platform in 2018

General information
- Location: Oftringen; Switzerland
- Coordinates: 47°19′12″N 7°57′47″E
- Owner: Swiss Federal Railways
- Line: Zofingen–Wettingen line
- Distance: 4.9 km (3.0 mi) from Zofingen
- Train operators: Swiss Federal Railways

Passengers
- 2018: 130 per weekday

Services
Preceding station	Aargau S-Bahn	Following station
Küngoldingen towards Zofingen	S28	Safenwil towards Lenzburg
Location
- Location within Switzerland Location within Canton of Aargau

Walterswil-Striegel railway station (German: Bahnhof Walterswil-Striegel) is a railway station in the municipality of Oftringen, in the Swiss canton of Aargau. It is an intermediate stop on the standard gauge Zofingen–Wettingen line of Swiss Federal Railways.

== Services ==
The following services stop at Walterswil-Striegel:

- Aargau S-Bahn S28: half-hourly service between Zofingen and Lenzburg.
