= Bern Bümpliz Nord railway station =

Railway station in Bern, Switzerland

Bern Bümpliz Nord
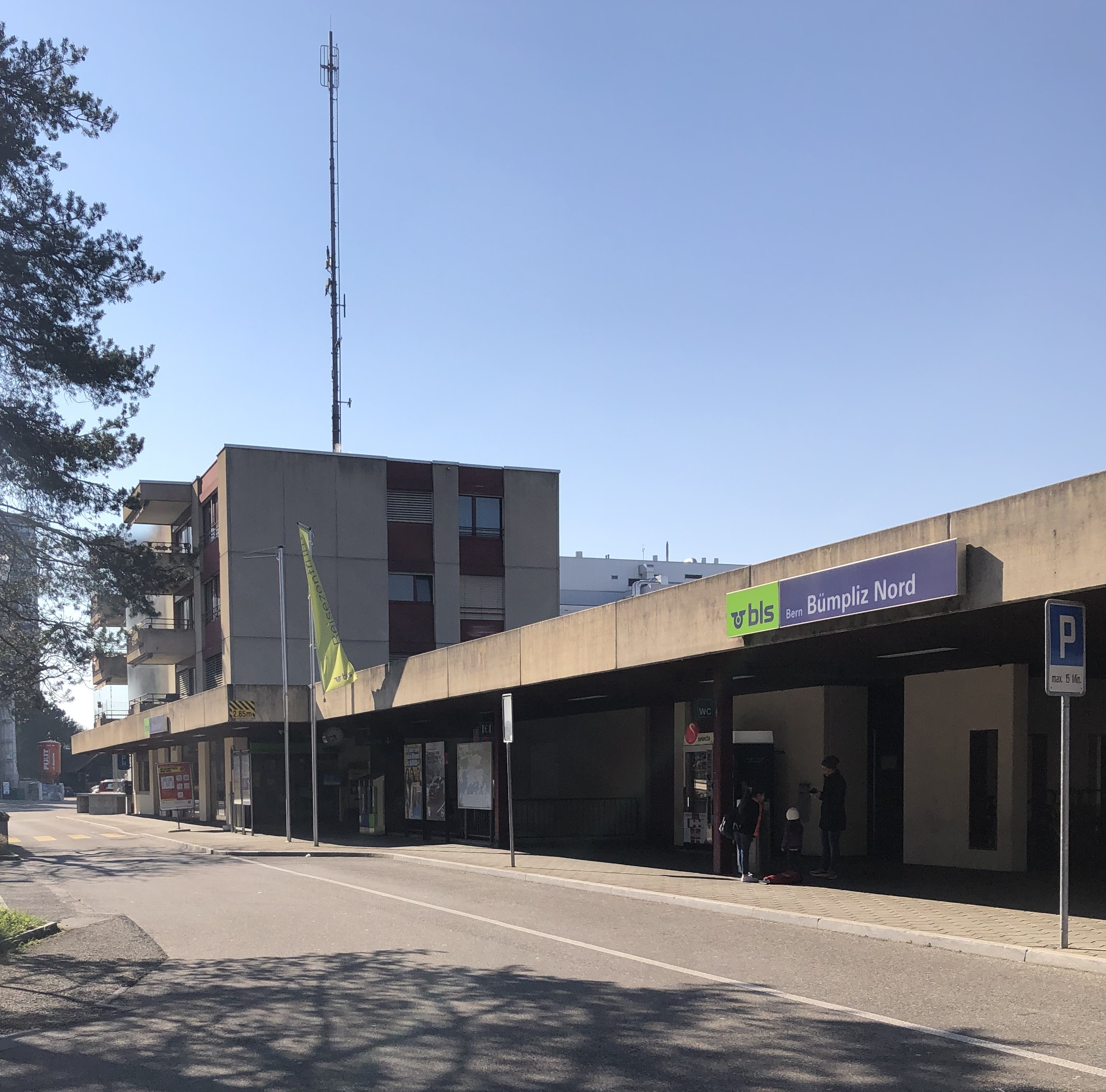
- The station building in 2020

General information
- Location: Bern; Switzerland
- Coordinates: 46°56′45″N 7°23′23″E
- Elevation: 555 m (1,821 ft)
- Owner: BLS AG
- Line: Bern–Neuchâtel line
- Distance: 4.2 km (2.6 mi) from Bern
- Platforms: 1 side platform; 1 island platform
- Tracks: 4
- Train operators: BLS AG
- Connections: BERNMOBIL bus line

Construction
- Parking: Yes (45 spaces)
- Accessible: No

Other information
- Station code: 8504489 (BNBZ)
- Fare zone: 101 (Libero)

Passengers
- 2023: 3'400 per weekday (BLS)

Services
Preceding station	Bern S-Bahn	Following station
Bern Brünnen Westside towards Neuchâtel or Avenches	S5	Bern Terminus
Bern Brünnen Westside towards Neuchâtel or Avenches	S5 Limited service	Bern Stöckacker towards Bern
Bern Brünnen Westside Terminus	S51	Bern Stöckacker towards Bern
Bern Brünnen Westside towards Murten/Morat, Payerne or Ins	S52	Bern Stöckacker towards Bern
Preceding station	BLS	Following station
Bern Brünnen Westside towards La Chaux-de-Fonds	IR 66 Limited service	Bern Stöckacker One-way operation
Location

Bern Bümpliz Nord railway station (German: Bahnhof Bern Bümpliz Nord) is a railway station in the municipality of Bern, in the Swiss canton of Bern. It is an intermediate stop on the standard gauge Bern–Neuchâtel line of BLS AG. Bern Bümpliz Süd railway station is located on the Lausanne–Bern line.

== Services ==
As of the December 2024 timetable change, the following services stop at Bern Bümpliz Nord:

- Bern S-Bahn:
  - S5: hourly service between Bern and Neuchâtel or Avenches; the train splits at Kerzers.
  - S51: half-hourly service between Bern Brünnen Westside and Bern.
  - S52: hourly service between Bern and Murten/Morat; rush-hour trains on weekdays continue from Kerzers to Ins and from Murten/Morat to Payerne.
- InterRegio:
  - : two trains per day on weekdays to La Chaux-de-Fonds.

== Gallery ==
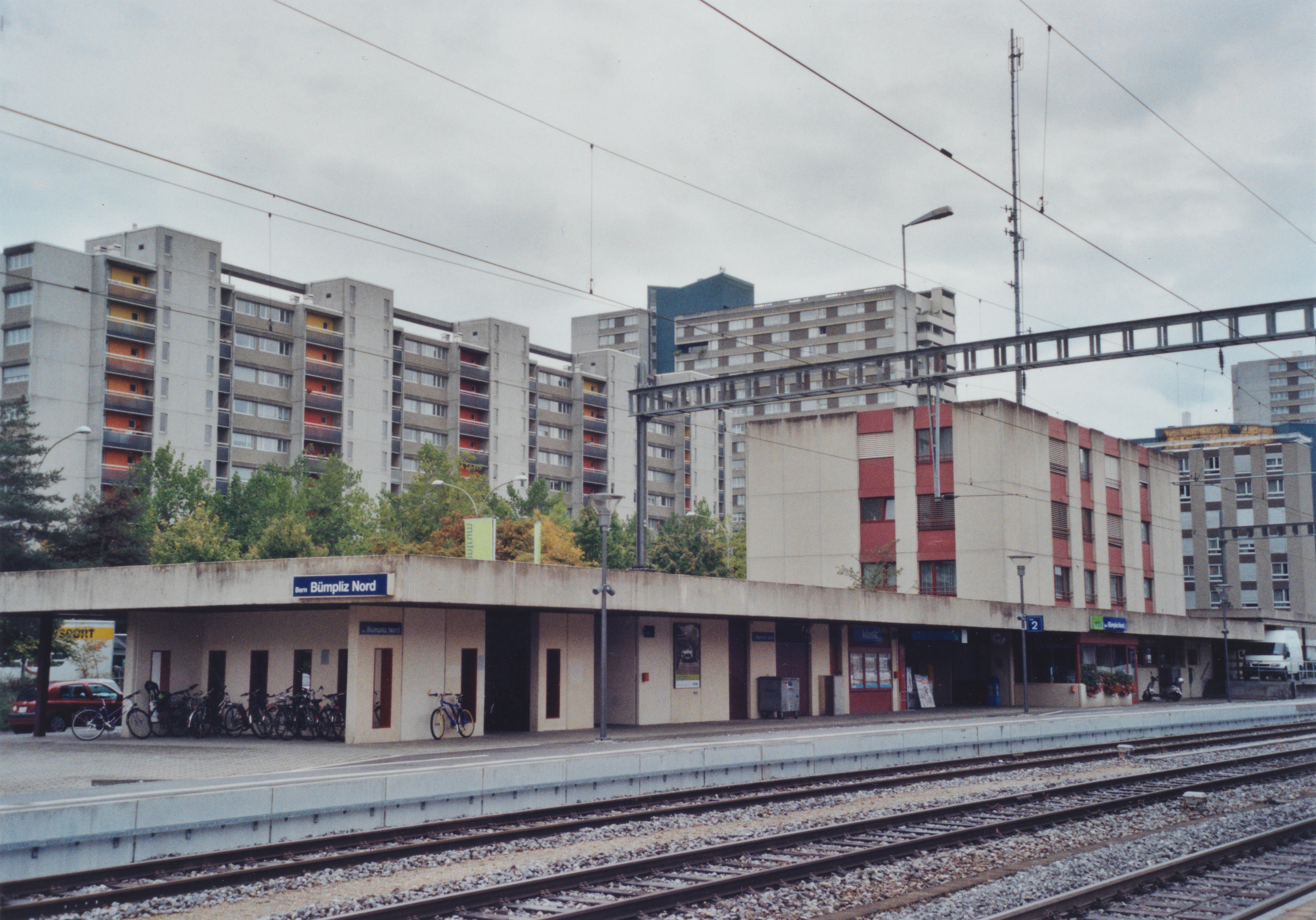
station (2010)

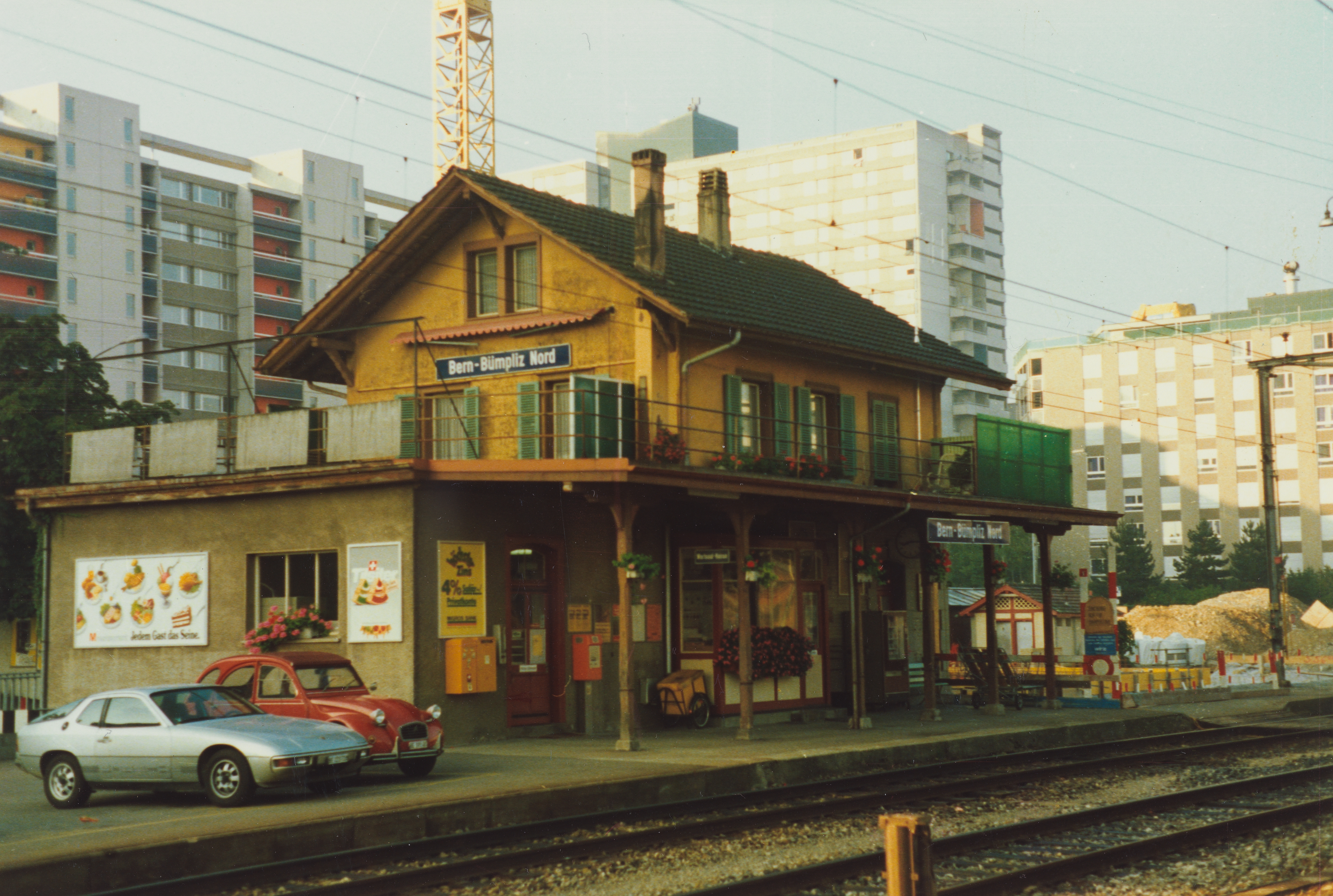
former station building (ca. 1975)

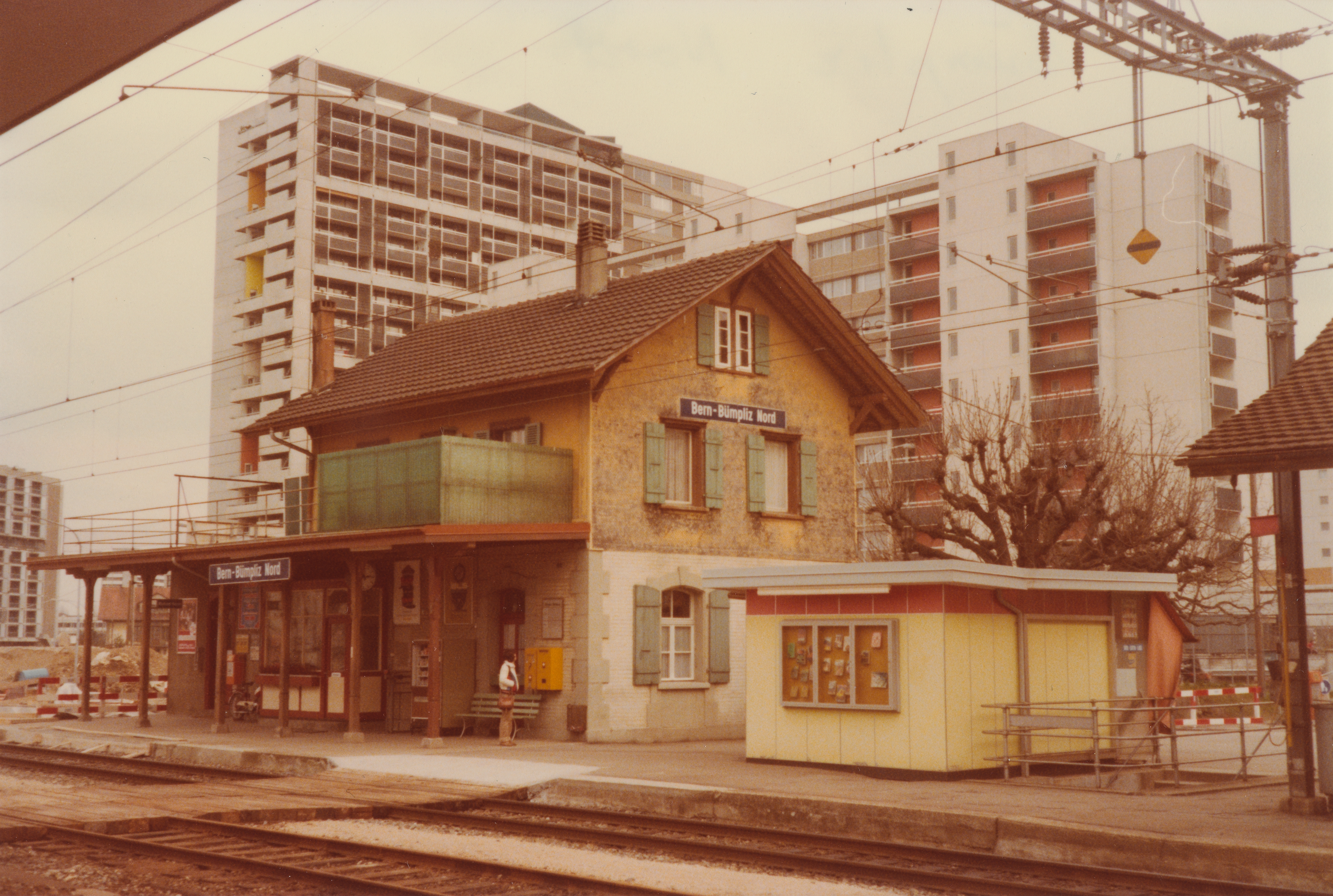
former station building (1979)
