= Küngoldingen railway station =

Railway station in Switzerland

Küngoldingen
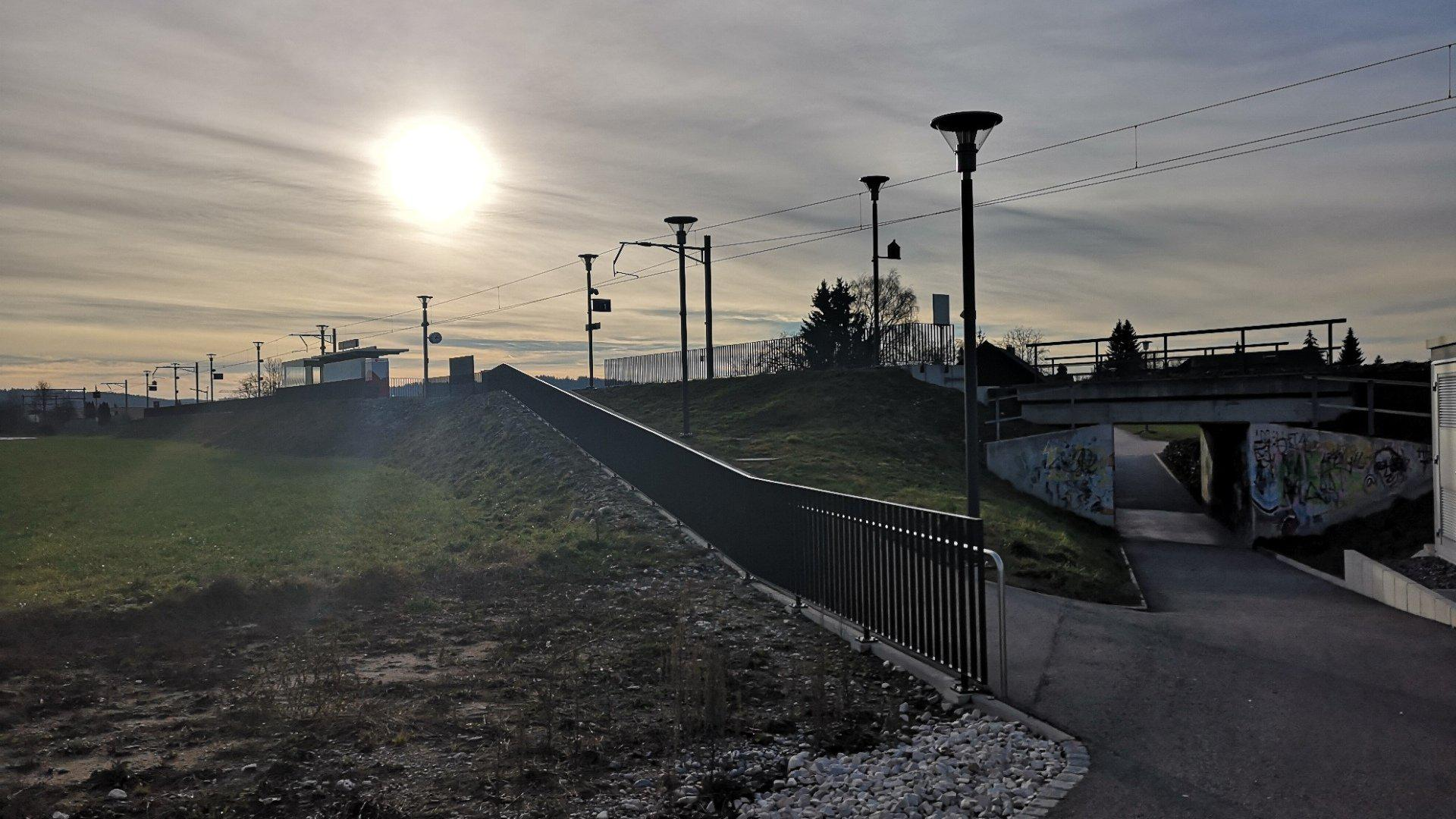
- The station platform in 2018

General information
- Location: Oftringen; Switzerland
- Coordinates: 47°18′07″N 7°56′30″E
- Owner: Swiss Federal Railways
- Line: Zofingen–Wettingen line
- Distance: 2.3 km (1.4 mi) from Zofingen
- Train operators: Swiss Federal Railways

Passengers
- 2018: 210 per weekday

Services
Preceding station	Aargau S-Bahn	Following station
Zofingen Terminus	S28	Walterswil-Striegel towards Lenzburg
Location
- Location within Switzerland Location within Canton of Aargau

Küngoldingen railway station (German: Bahnhof Küngoldingen) is a railway station in the municipality of Oftringen, in the Swiss canton of Aargau. It is an intermediate stop on the standard gauge Zofingen–Wettingen line of Swiss Federal Railways.

== Services ==
The following services stop at Küngoldingen:

- Aargau S-Bahn S28: half-hourly service between Zofingen and Lenzburg.
