= Bern Stöckacker railway station =

Railway station in Bern, Switzerland

Bern Stöckacker
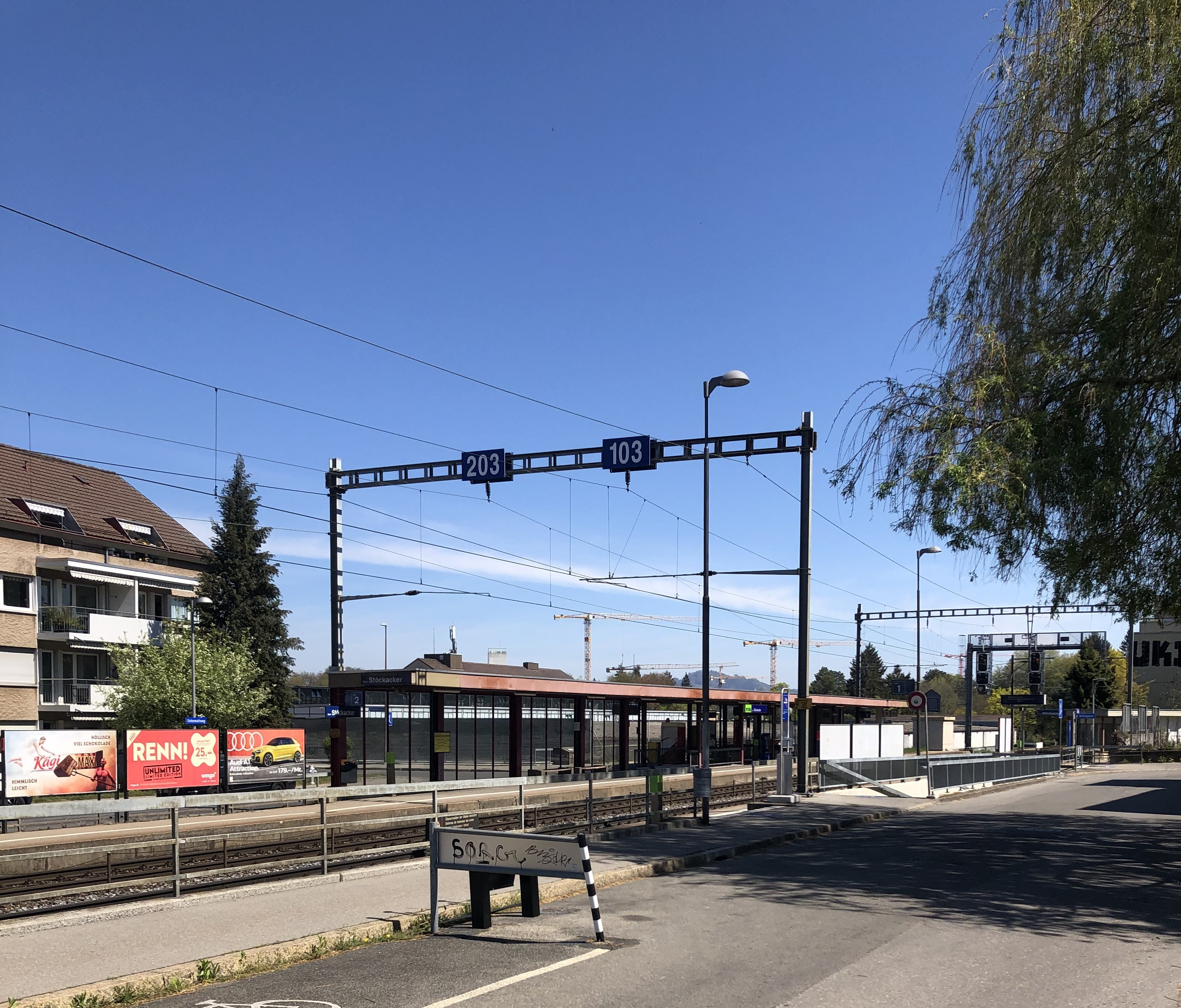
- The station platforms in 2020

General information
- Location: Bern; Switzerland
- Coordinates: 46°56′47″N 7°24′04″E
- Elevation: 551 m (1,808 ft)
- Owner: BLS AG
- Line: Bern–Neuchâtel line
- Distance: 3.3 km (2.1 mi) from Bern
- Platforms: 2 side platforms
- Tracks: 2
- Train operators: BLS AG
- Connections: Tram line 8

Construction
- Accessible: No

Other information
- Station code: 8504495 (BNST)
- Fare zone: 100 and 101 (Libero)

History
- Closed: 14 December 2025

Passengers
- 2023: 970 per weekday (BLS)

Services
Preceding station	Bern S-Bahn	Following station
Bern Bümpliz Nord towards Neuchâtel or Avenches	S5 Limited service	Bern Terminus
Bern Bümpliz Nord towards Bern Brünnen Westside	S51	Bern Terminus
Bern Bümpliz Nord towards Murten/Morat, Payerne or Ins	S52	Bern Terminus
Preceding station	BLS	Following station
Bern Bümpliz Nord towards La Chaux-de-Fonds	IR 66 Limited service	Bern One-way operation
Location

Bern Stöckacker railway station (German: Bahnhof Bern Stöckacker) is a railway station in the municipality of Bern, in the Swiss canton of Bern. It is an intermediate stop on the standard gauge Bern–Neuchâtel line of BLS AG. This station will close with the December 2025 timetable change.

== Services ==
As of the December 2024 timetable change, the following services stop at Bern Stöckacker:

- Bern S-Bahn:
  - S5: limited service between Bern and Neuchâtel and Avenches.
  - S51: half-hourly service between Bern Brünnen Westside and Bern.
  - S52: hourly service between Bern and Murten/Morat; rush-hour trains on weekdays continue from Kerzers to Ins and from Murten/Morat to Payerne.
- InterRegio:
  - : two trains per day on weekdays to La Chaux-de-Fonds.
