= Gümmenen railway station =

Railway station in Ferenbalm, Switzerland

Gümmenen
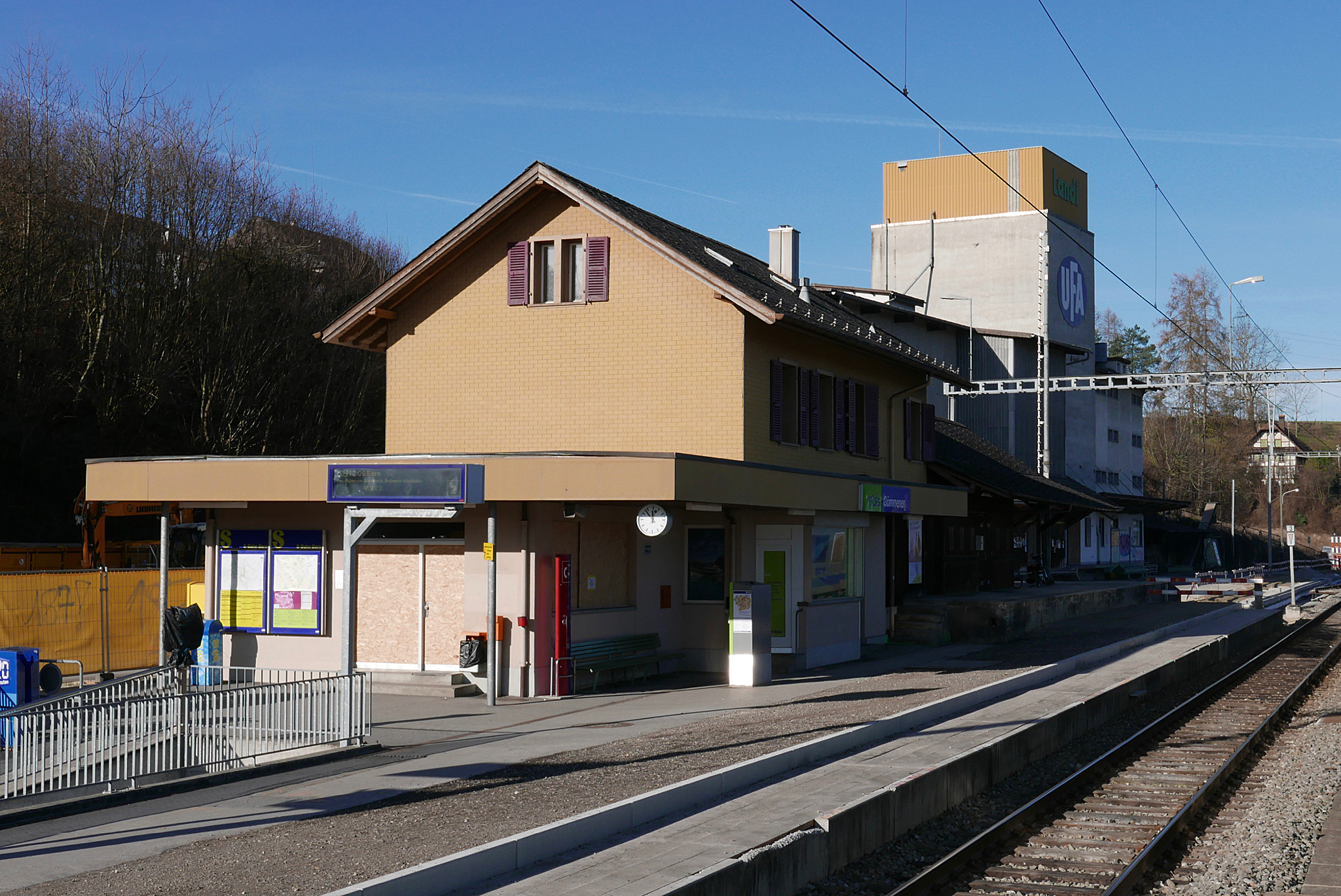
- The station building in 2016

General information
- Location: Ferenbalm; Switzerland
- Coordinates: 46°56′32″N 7°14′04″E
- Elevation: 494 m (1,621 ft)
- Owner: BLS AG
- Lines: Bern–Neuchâtel line; Flamatt–Laupen–Gümmenen line
- Distance: 17.0 km (10.6 mi) from Bern
- Platforms: 2 side platforms
- Tracks: 2
- Train operators: BLS AG
- Connections: PostAuto AG bus lines; TPF bus lines

Construction
- Parking: Yes (117 spaces)
- Accessible: Yes

Other information
- Station code: 8504486 (GMM)
- Fare zone: 698 (Libero)

Passengers
- 2023: 840 per weekday (BLS)

Services
Preceding station	Bern S-Bahn	Following station
Kerzers towards Neuchâtel or Avenches	S5	Rosshäusern towards Bern
Kerzers towards Murten/Morat, Payerne or Ins	S52	Rosshäusern towards Bern
Preceding station	BLS	Following station
Kerzers One-way operation	IR 66 Rush-hour service	Bern Terminus
Location

Gümmenen railway station (German: Bahnhof Gümmenen) is a railway station in the municipality of Ferenbalm, in the Swiss canton of Bern. It is an intermediate stop on the standard gauge Bern–Neuchâtel line of BLS AG. Gümmenen was formerly the northern terminus of the standard gauge Flamatt–Laupen–Gümmenen line to Flamatt, but service beyond Laupen ended in 1993.

== Services ==
As of the December 2024 timetable change, the following services stop at Gümmenen:

- Bern S-Bahn:
  - S5: hourly service between Bern and Neuchâtel or Avenches; the train splits at Kerzers.
  - S52: hourly service between Bern and Murten/Morat; rush-hour trains on weekdays continue from Kerzers to Ins and from Murten/Morat to Payerne.
- InterRegio:
  - : morning rush-hour service on weekdays to Bern.
