= Bern Brünnen Westside railway station =

Railway station in Bern, Switzerland

Bern Brünnen Westside
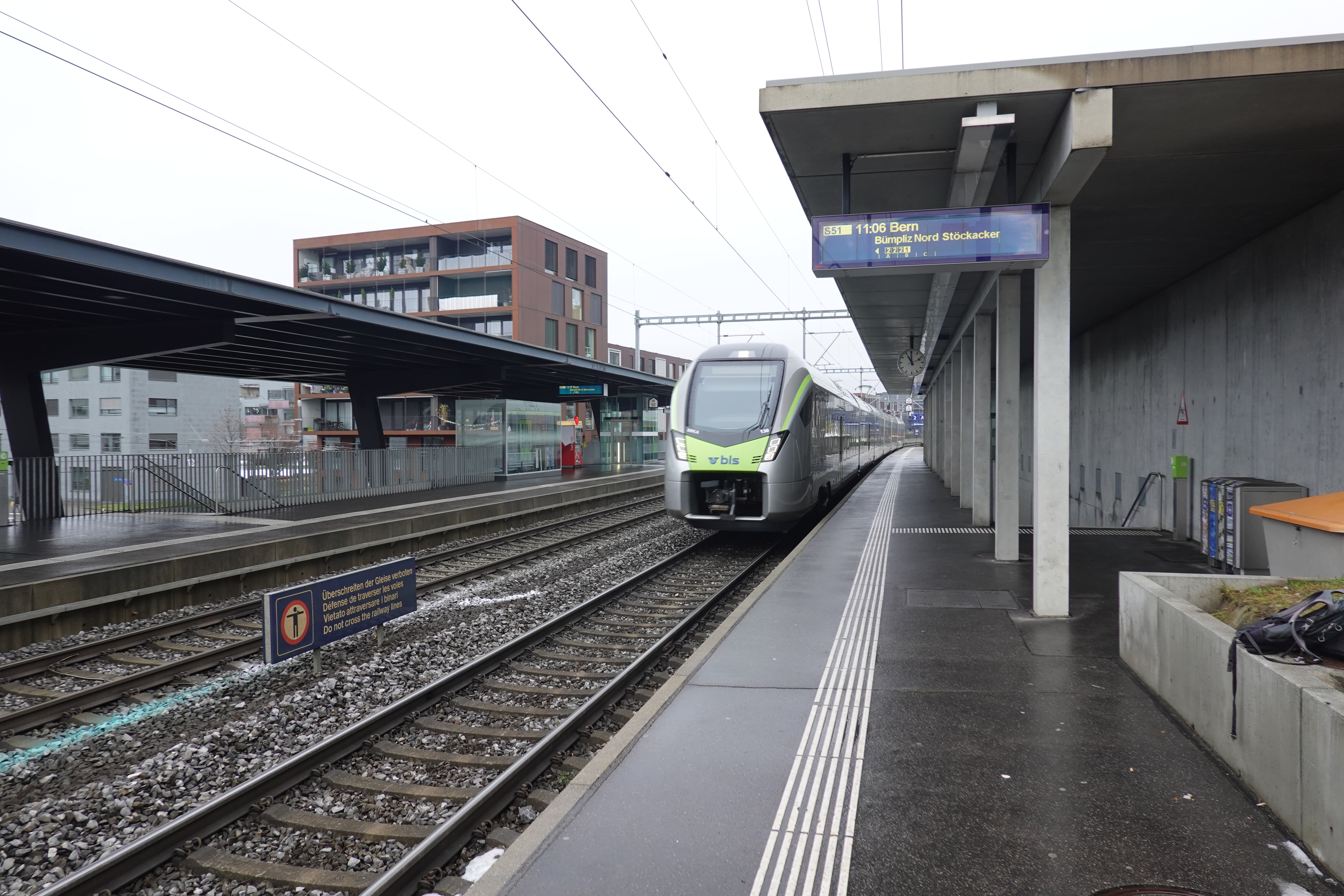
- A BLS train passes the station in 2023

General information
- Location: Bern; Switzerland
- Coordinates: 46°56′39″N 7°22′31″E
- Elevation: 558 m (1,831 ft)
- Owner: BLS AG
- Line: Bern–Neuchâtel line
- Distance: 5.3 km (3.3 mi) from Bern
- Platforms: 2 side platforms
- Tracks: 2
- Train operators: BLS AG
- Connections: Tram line 8; BERNMOBIL; PostAuto AG bus line

Construction
- Accessible: Yes

Other information
- Station code: 8516154 (BNB)
- Fare zone: 101 (Libero)

History
- Former names: Bern Brünnen (until 2010)

Passengers
- 2023: 3'100 per weekday (BLS)

Services
Preceding station	Bern S-Bahn	Following station
Rosshäusern towards Neuchâtel or Avenches	S5	Bern Bümpliz Nord towards Bern
Terminus	S51	Bern Bümpliz Nord towards Bern
Bern Riedbach towards Murten/Morat, Payerne or Ins	S52	Bern Bümpliz Nord towards Bern
Preceding station	BLS	Following station
Kerzers towards La Chaux-de-Fonds	IR 66 Limited service	Bern Bümpliz Nord One-way operation
Location

Bern Brünnen Westside railway station (German: Bahnhof Bern Brünnen Westside) is a railway station in the municipality of Bern, in the Swiss canton of Bern. It is an intermediate stop on the standard gauge Bern–Neuchâtel line of BLS AG.

== Services ==
As of the December 2024 timetable change, the following services stop at Bern Brünnen Westside:

- Bern S-Bahn:
  - S5: hourly service between Bern and Neuchâtel or Avenches; the train splits at Kerzers.
  - S51: half-hourly service to Bern.
  - S52: hourly service between Bern and Murten/Morat; rush-hour trains on weekdays continue from Kerzers to Ins and from Murten/Morat to Payerne.
- InterRegio:
  - : two trains per day on weekdays to La Chaux-de-Fonds.
