= Bern railway station =

Railway station in Bern, Switzerland

Bern
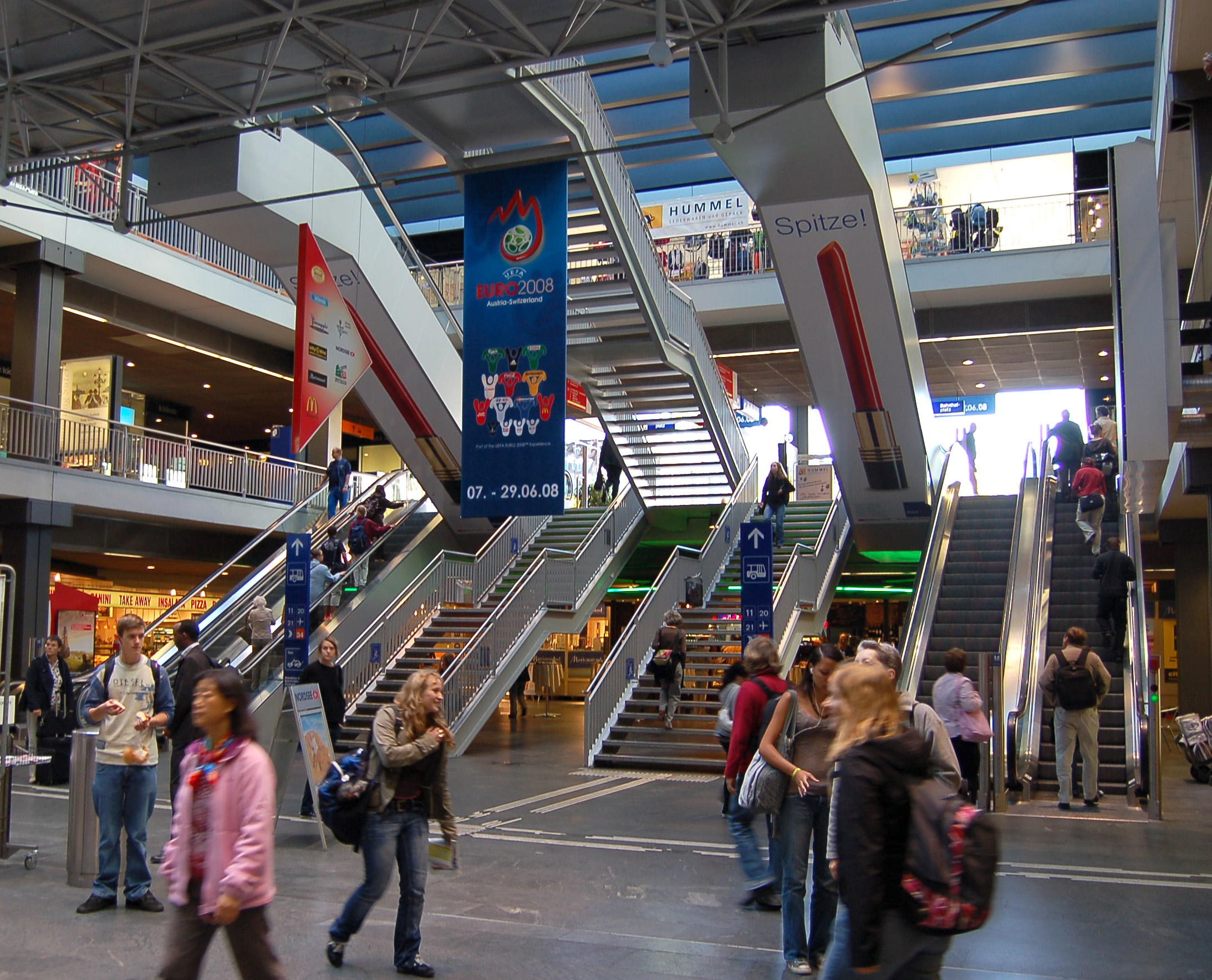
- Major hall on level -1

General information
- Location: Bahnhofplatz; Bern; Switzerland
- Coordinates: 46°56′56″N 7°26′21″E
- Elevation: 540 m (1,770 ft)
- Owner: Swiss Federal Railways
- Lines: Lausanne–Bern line; Olten–Bern line; Bern–Thun line; Biel–Bern line; Bern–Lucerne line; Bern–Neuchâtel line; Bern–Belp–Thun line; Bern–Schwarzenburg line; Zollikofen–Bern line
- Platforms: 8
- Tracks: 17
- Train operators: BLS AG; Deutsche Bahn (DB); Regionalverkehr Bern-Solothurn (RBS); Südostbahn (SOB); Swiss Federal Railways (SBB)
- Connections: SVB
- Tram: BERNMOBIL trams 3 6 7 8 9
- Trolleybus: BERNMOBIL trolleybuses
- Bus: BERNMOBIL and PostAuto AG buses

Construction
- Structure type: Underground
- Parking: Yes
- Cycle facilities: Yes
- Accessible: Partly

Other information
- Station code: 8507000 (BN)
- IATA code: ZDJ
- Fare zone: 100 (Libero)

History
- Opened: 1858–1860
- Rebuilt: 1891, 1974, 1999–2003
- Former names: Bern Hauptbahnhof

Passengers
- 2025: 177,000 per day (BLS, SBB, SOB, TPF (excluding RBS))
- Rank: 2 of 1,095
Services
Preceding station	SBB CFF FFS	Following station
Reverses direction	EuroCity	Olten towards Hamburg-Altona
Reverses direction	EuroCity	Thun towards Interlaken Ost
Reverses direction	EuroCity	Olten towards Basel SBB
Reverses direction	EuroCity	Thun towards Milano Centrale
Terminus	IC	Zürich HB Terminus
Terminus	IC	Bern Wankdorf towards Zürich HB
Fribourg/Freiburg towards Geneva Airport	IC 1	Zürich HB towards St. Gallen
Reverses direction	IC 6	Olten towards Basel SBB
Reverses direction	IC 6	Thun towards Brig
Reverses direction	IC 8	Zürich HB towards Romanshorn
Reverses direction	IC 8	Thun towards Brig
Reverses direction	IC 61	Olten towards Basel SBB
Reverses direction	IC 61	Thun towards Interlaken Ost
Reverses direction	IC 81	Zürich HB towards Romanshorn
Reverses direction	IC 81	Thun towards Interlaken Ost
Fribourg/Freiburg towards Geneva Airport	IR 15	Zofingen towards Lucerne
Terminus	IR 16	Olten towards Zürich HB
Neuchâtel towards Frasne	RE9 Weekends only	Terminus
Preceding station	Südostbahn	Following station
Terminus	IR 35 Aare Linth	Burgdorf towards Chur
Preceding station	Regionalverkehr Bern-Solothurn	Following station
Terminus	RE5	Jegenstorf towards Solothurn
Preceding station	RER Fribourg	Following station
Düdingen towards Broc-Chocolaterie	RE2	Terminus
Preceding station	DB Fernverkehr	Following station
Reverses direction	ICE 12	Olten towards Berlin Ostbahnhof
Reverses direction	ICE 12	Thun towards Brig or Interlaken Ost
Preceding station	Bern S-Bahn	Following station
Bern Europaplatz towards Fribourg/Freiburg	S1	Bern Wankdorf towards Thun
Terminus	S11 Rush-hour service	Bern Wankdorf One-way operation
Bern Europaplatz towards Laupen BE	S2	Bern Wankdorf towards Langnau i.E.
Terminus	S22 Rush-hour service	Bern Wankdorf towards Langnau i.E.
Bern Europaplatz towards Belp	S3	Bern Wankdorf towards Biel/Bienne
Bern Europaplatz towards Belp	S31	Bern Wankdorf towards Münchenbuchsee or Biel/Bienne
Belp towards Thun	S4	Bern Wankdorf towards Langnau i.E.
Belp towards Thun	S44	Bern Wankdorf towards Solothurn or Sumiswald-Grünen
Bern Stöckacker towards Neuchâtel or Avenches	S5 Limited service	Terminus
Bern Bümpliz Nord towards Neuchâtel or Avenches	S5	Terminus
Bern Stöckacker towards Bern Brünnen Westside	S51	Terminus
Bern Stöckacker towards Murten/Morat, Payerne or Ins	S52	Terminus
Bern Europaplatz towards Schwarzenburg	S6	Terminus
Terminus	S7	Worblaufen towards Worb Dorf
Terminus	S7 Rush-hour service	Worblaufen towards Bolligen
Terminus	S8	Worblaufen towards Jegenstorf or Bätterkinden
Terminus	S9	Bern Felsenau towards Unterzollikofen
Preceding station	BLS	Following station
Terminus	IR 17	Burgdorf towards Olten
Terminus	IR 65	Lyss towards Biel/Bienne
Kerzers towards La Chaux-de-Fonds	IR 66	Terminus
Bern Stöckacker towards La Chaux-de-Fonds	IR 66 Limited service	Terminus
Gümmenen One-way operation	IR 66 Rush-hour service	Terminus
Kerzers towards Neuchâtel	IR 66 Rush-hour service	Terminus
Terminus	RE1	Münsingen towards Brig, Domodossola or Zweisimmen
Terminus	RE7	Konolfingen towards Lucerne
Location
- Location within Switzerland Location within Canton of Bern

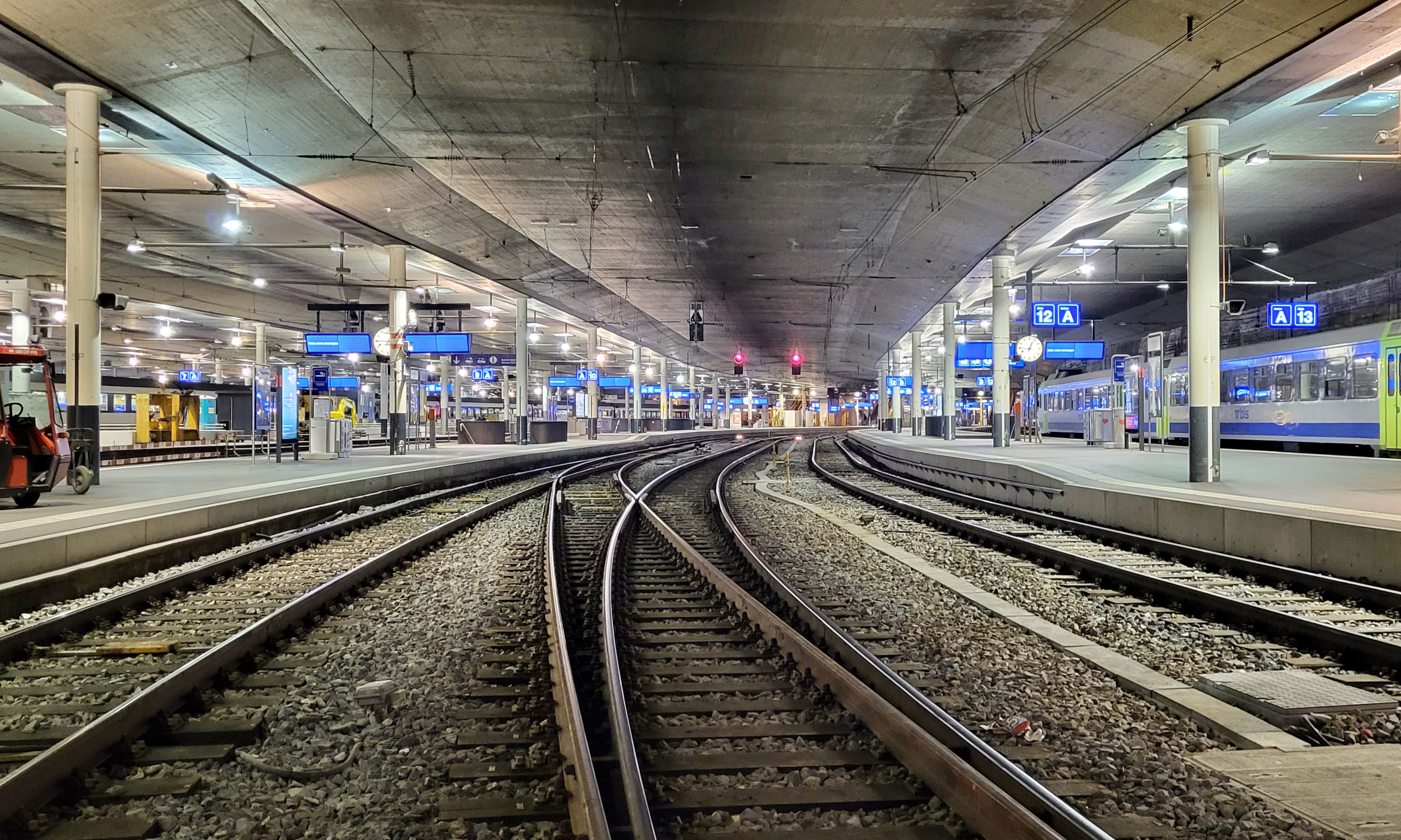
The platforms are covered with a roof spanning over all tracks

Bern railway station (German: Bahnhof Bern) serves the municipality of Bern, the federal city of Switzerland. Opened progressively between 1858 and 1860, and rebuilt several times since then, it lies on the Olten–Bern and the Lausanne–Bern lines (together forming the line known as the Mittellandlinie in German) and is near the end of the Lötschberg line. The station is owned by the Swiss Federal Railways (SBB CFF FFS). Train services to and from the station are operated by the Swiss Federal Railways, the Bern-Lötschberg-Simplon railway (BLS) and the metre gauge Regionalverkehr Bern-Solothurn (RBS). Trains calling at the station include ICEs, and international trains to Italy.

Bern is the nearest station to the University of Bern in the Länggasse quarter. There is a rooftop terrace on top of the station, accessed by lift from the subway by Platforms 12 and 13, with views over the city and to the Bernese Alps. Access to Bern Airport from the station is normally via rail to Belp station and then by connecting bus, but the first and last buses each day run directly between Bern station and the airport. It has an IATA Airport Code (ZDJ), as American Airlines codeshares on the Swiss Federal Railways service from Zurich Airport in Zürich.

Between 1999 and 2003, the station was renovated and partially redesigned. Presently, the site contains Rail City, a shopping center open for longer opening hours than most other shops in the city, and also on Sundays and public holidays, when most other shops are closed; this is possible as the shop opening laws of the Canton and the city of Bern do not apply to federally-owned real estate. The station has six standard-gauge platforms serving twelve tracks (numbered 1–10 and 12–13) and two meter gauge RBS platforms serving four tracks (numbered 21–24). There is no platform 11, but there is a through railway track with no platform face between platforms 10 and 12. The station interchanges with many local bus, tram and trolleybus routes (operated by BERNMOBIL) and regional bus services (operated by PostAuto AG).

Amid projections of dramatically increasing passenger numbers, plans for a major expansion and development of Bern Station, largely focusing upon new underground areas, were mooted during the 2010s. Swiss Federal Railways, Regional Bern-Solothurn, and the city of Bern are the key backers behind this development. On 26 June 2017, authorisation to proceed with the planned station expansion was issued and construction activity commenced during the following month. The renovated station was expected to be completed by the end of 2025, but was delayed until 2027, and has now been delayed until 2029.

== History ==
=== Early operations ===
During 1848, in conjunction with various other changes institutes as Switzerland transitioned to a new federal government system, it was declared by the Federal Council that the city of Bern had been selected as the nation's new capital. As a consequence of this decision, Bern experienced a construction boom promptly thereafter; this work was undertaken with the goal of providing the various amenities and local infrastructure in line with its new-found status. Amongst the projects commenced was a sizable railway station, which was built to accommodate the large volume of local, regional, and international traffic which had been anticipated.

Throughout its life, Bern railway station has been the second biggest station in Switzerland. Over the course of time, Bern station has been progressively expanded and new services added. Currently, it forms the central hub for the city's S-Bahn network, as well as being a major interchange providing connections throughout the metropolitan area, covering an area containing in excess of one million people. Reportedly, projections have been produced which anticipate that, by 2030, passenger numbers using the station are set to rise to between 260,000 and 375,000 people per day.

=== Redevelopment ===
The station was rebuilt in a decade long project in the 1960s.

During the early part of the twenty-first century, a team of Swiss Federal Railways, Regional Bern-Solothurn, and the city of Bern formed for the purpose of further developing Bern Station to better satisfy the needs of the expanding fare-paying members of the public. In accordance with this aim, in the 2010s, a concept emerged for the station's expansion, which encompasses the construction of a new underground station, along with supporting underground and outdoor works, to accommodate the increased demand. Specifically, a new pedestrian underpass was proposed, which is claimed would result in a reduction in the time taken to transfer between the station's platforms; this underpass is not only for access alone, but shall also accommodate various services and retail outlets. This underpass shall also feature two new station entrances at Bubenberg Centre and Länggasse, roughly half of all passengers are expected to use these new entrances.

The new lower station area is planned to accommodate a total of four tracks, which are to be run underneath six individual tracks of the existing station. It shall principally comprise a pair of large underground halls, each being furnished with a single 12 meter-wide central platform and two tracks; the dimensions of these platforms are to be precisely built so to best ease the boarding and unboarding processes from stopping train. Pedestrian access to and from the platforms is to be achieved via both escalators and elevators, allowing for a quick transition to the older platforms where the main line long-distance and S-Bahn services shall continue to stop at, or to exist the station into the city itself.

Various adaptions and changes to both the existing station and its surrounding area are planned. Larger underground car parking areas are to be constructed at Eilgut, as well as underground spaces for the installation of miscellaneous railway systems and emergency access routes. The station's decorative Perron ceiling is to undergo restoration, while various track works and the installation of new signal boxes shall also take place. A considerable emphasis has been placed upon the facility's aesthetics; it is to this end that the south wall of the main station hall, facing towards the Burgerspital building, shall be partially removed, which is envisioned to generate a brighter and friendlier atmosphere within the hall.

On 26 June 2017, official approval was given for the construction of the proposed station expansion. The next month, construction work at the site was initiated. At this point, work on the first phase of the expansion was not anticipated to be completed until the end of 2025. Reportedly, the new station itself is expected to cost CHF614 million ($643 million), while the expansion of associated public amenities has been costed at CHF360 million ($377 million) and supporting traffic measures in the vicinity has a cost of CHF93 million ($97 million); financing is provided by the federal government, city authorities, and Canton. The federal government via infrastructure funds, the city of Bern, and Canton will provide most of the financing. As originally proposed, the expansion is set to be performed across two individual phases of work; the first phase shall include the construction of the new underground station area and the pedestrian underpass. Work on expanding the station's footprint outwards at its sides shall be performed in the second stage, which is anticipated to be done by 2035.

== Services ==
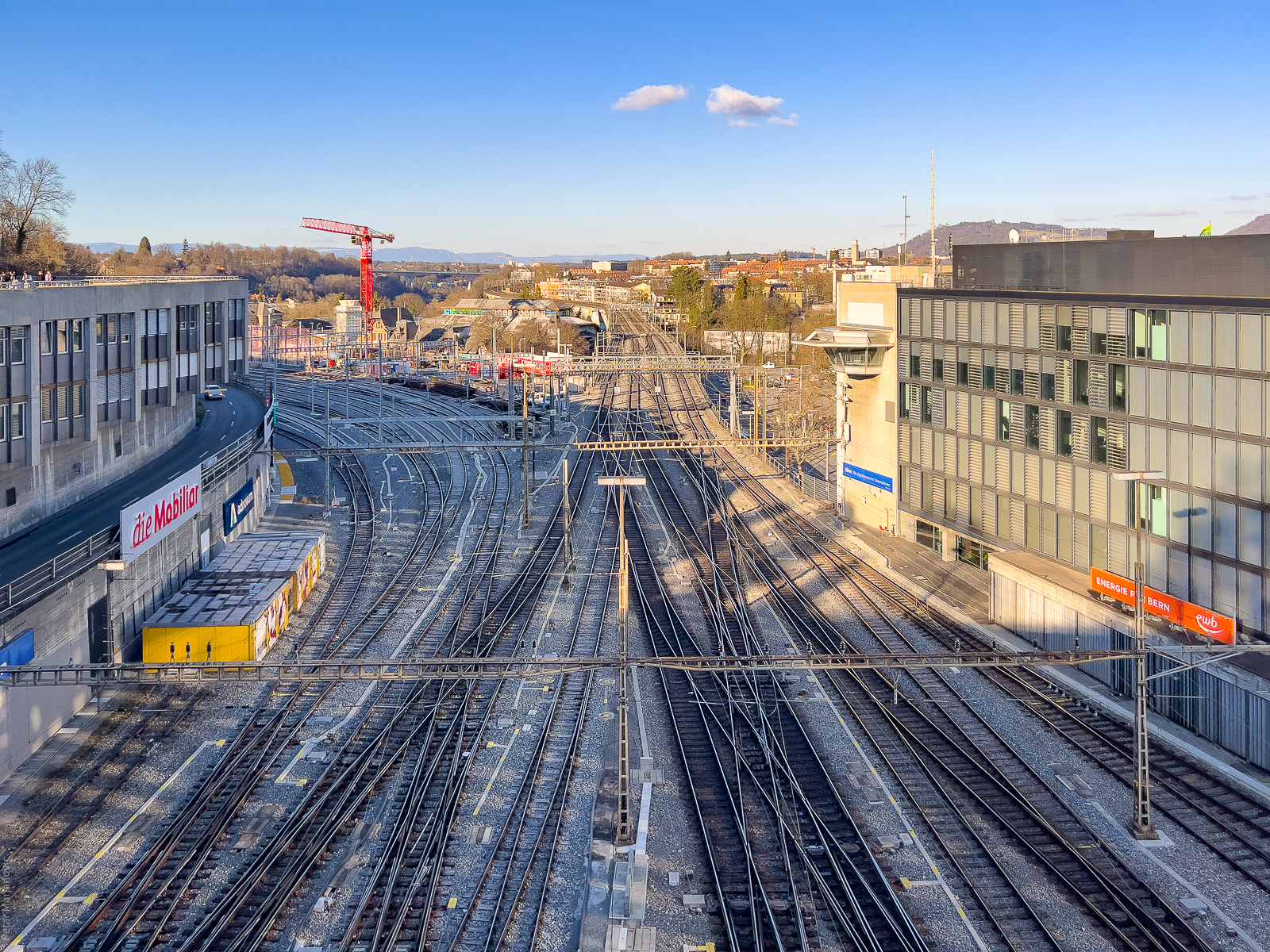
Most of the long-distance trains pass through the north exit of the station.

As of the December 2024 timetable change, the following services stop at Bern:

- EuroCity / InterCity / Intercity Express (ICE): half-hourly service between Basel SBB and Spiez. Most northbound trains terminate in Basel; a single EuroCity continues to Hamburg-Altona, and two ICEs continue to Berlin Ostbahnhof. Most southbound trains continue to Interlaken Ost; one train every two hours continues to Brig. Three EuroCity trains continue from Brig to Milano Centrale.
- InterCity:
  - hourly service between Zürich Hauptbahnhof and Brig.
  - hourly service between Geneva Airport and St. Gallen.
  - rush-hour service on weekdays to Zürich Hauptbahnhof.
- InterRegio:
  - three trains per hour to Olten, two per hour to Zürich Hauptbahnhof, and one per hour to Chur.
  - half-hourly service to Biel/Bienne.
  - hourly service between Geneva Airport and Lucerne.
  - hourly service to La Chaux-de-Fonds.
- RegioExpress:
  - hourly service to Zweisimmen or Brig / Domodossola; the train splits at Spiez.
  - half-hourly service or service every fifteen minutes on weekdays to Solothurn.
  - hourly service to Lucerne.
- Bern S-Bahn:
  - S1: half-hourly service between Fribourg/Freiburg and Thun.
  - S2: half-hourly service between Laupen BE and Langnau.
  - S22: rush-hour service Monday to Friday to Langnau.
  - S3: half-hourly service between Biel/Bienne and Belp.
  - S31: rush-hour service between Münchenbuchsee or Biel/Bienne and Belp.
  - S4 / S44: half-hourly service between Thun and Burgdorf and hourly service from Burgdorf to Langnau, Solothurn, or Sumiswald-Grünen.
  - S5: hourly service to Neuchâtel and Avenches.
  - S51: half-hourly service to Bern Brünnen Westside.
  - S52: hourly service to Murten/Morat, rush-hour trains continue from Kerzers to Ins and from Murten/Morat to Payerne.
  - S6: half-hourly service to Schwarzenburg.
  - S7: service every fifteen minutes to Worb Dorf, rush-hour service on weekdays to Bolligen.
  - S8: service every fifteen minutes to Jegenstorf with every second train continuing to Bätterkinden.
  - S9: service every fifteen minutes to Unterzollikofen.
- RER Fribourg
  - RE2: hourly service to Broc-Chocolaterie.

== See also ==
- History of rail transport in Switzerland
- Rail transport in Switzerland
