= Kerzers railway station =

Railway station in Kerzers, Switzerland

Kerzers
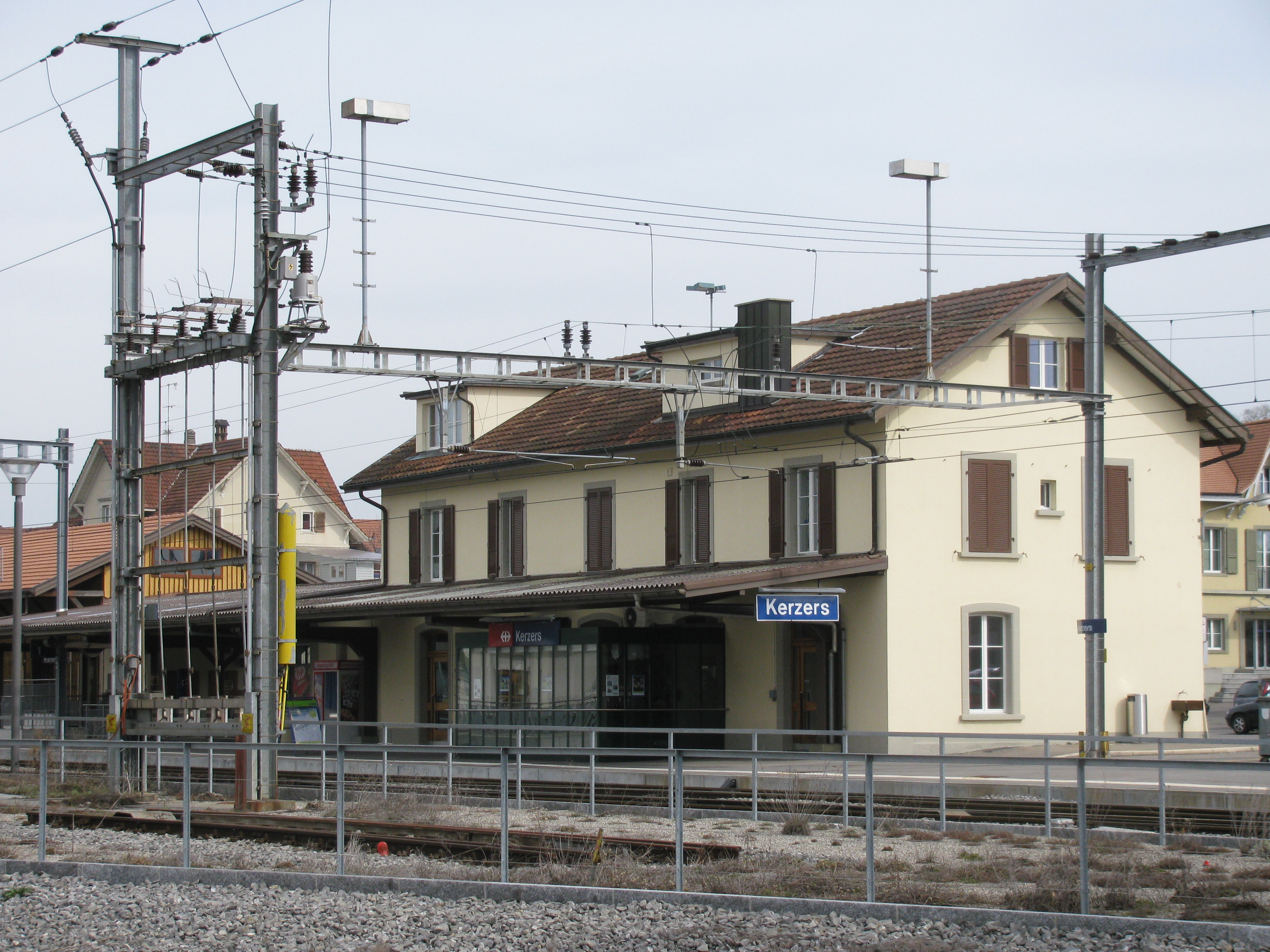
- The station building in 2009

General information
- Location: Kerzers; Switzerland
- Coordinates: 46°58′30″N 7°11′34″E
- Elevation: 442 m (1,450 ft)
- Owner: Swiss Federal Railways
- Lines: Bern–Neuchâtel line; Palézieux–Lyss line
- Distance: 84.8 km (52.7 mi) from Lausanne
- Platforms: 4 side platforms
- Tracks: 6
- Train operators: BLS AG
- Connections: PostAuto AG bus lines

Construction
- Parking: Yes (63 spaces)
- Cycle facilities: Yes (56 spaces)

Other information
- Station code: 8516192 (KZ)
- Fare zone: 56 (frimobil); 697 (Libero)

Passengers
- 2023: 4'900 per weekday (BLS, SBB)

Services
Preceding station	BLS	Following station
Ins towards La Chaux-de-Fonds	IR 66	Bern Terminus
Ins towards La Chaux-de-Fonds	IR 66 Limited service	Bern Brünnen Westside One-way operation
Ins towards Neuchâtel	IR 66 Rush-hour service	Bern One-way operation
Müntschemier One-way operation	IR 66 Rush-hour service	Gümmenen towards Bern
Preceding station	Bern S-Bahn	Following station
Terminus	S35	Kerzers Papiliorama towards Lyss
Galmiz towards Avenches	S5	Gümmenen towards Bern
Müntschemier towards Neuchâtel	S5	Gümmenen towards Bern
Galmiz towards Murten/Morat or Payerne	S52	Gümmenen towards Bern
Müntschemier towards Ins	S52 Limited service	Gümmenen towards Bern
Location

Kerzers railway station (German: Bahnhof Kerzers, French: Gare de Chiètres) is a railway station in the municipality of Kerzers, in the Swiss canton of Fribourg. It is located at the junction of the standard gauge Bern–Neuchâtel line of BLS AG and the standard gauge Palézieux–Lyss line of Swiss Federal Railways.

== Services ==
As of the December 2024 timetable change, the following services stop at Kerzers:

- InterRegio:
  - : hourly service between La Chaux-de-Fonds and Bern.
  - : rush-hour service between Neuchâtel and Bern.
- Bern S-Bahn:
  - S35: hourly service to Lyss.
  - S5: hourly service between Bern and Neuchâtel or Avenches.
  - S52: hourly service between Bern and Murten/Morat; rush-hour trains continue from Murten/Morat to Payerne; rush-hour trains continue to Ins.
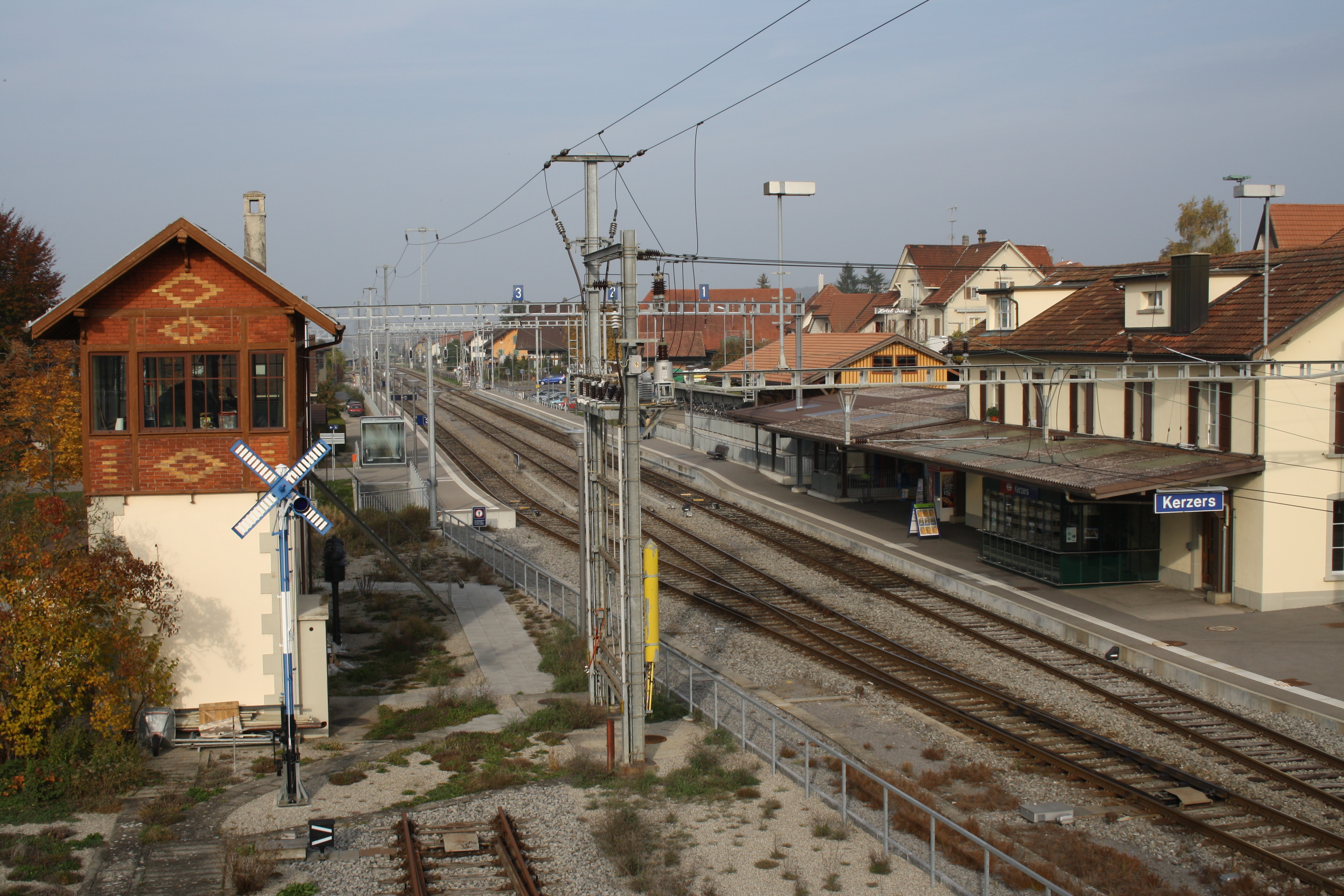
Overview of the station in 2009

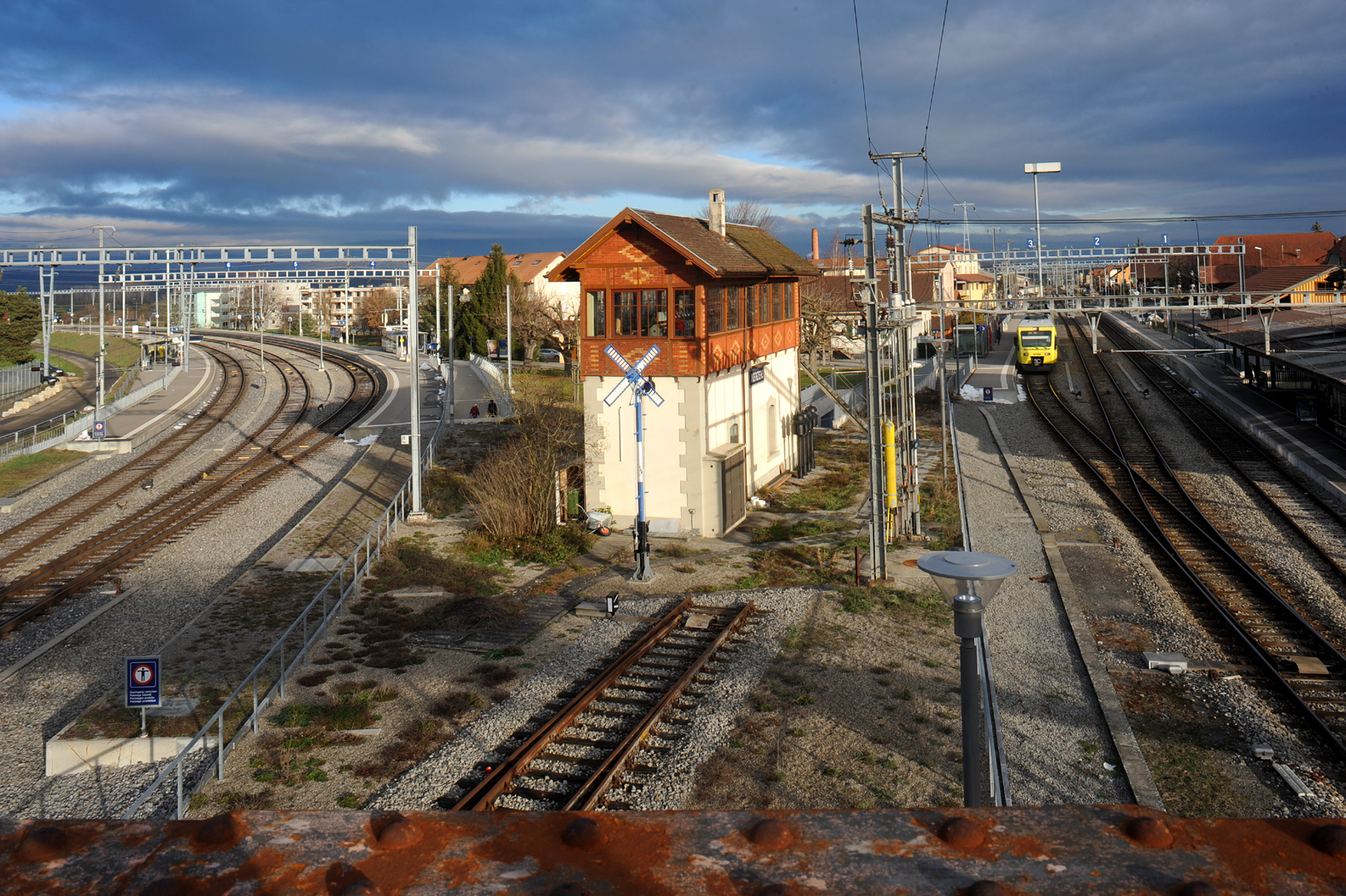
The signal box is presevered as a museum (2010)

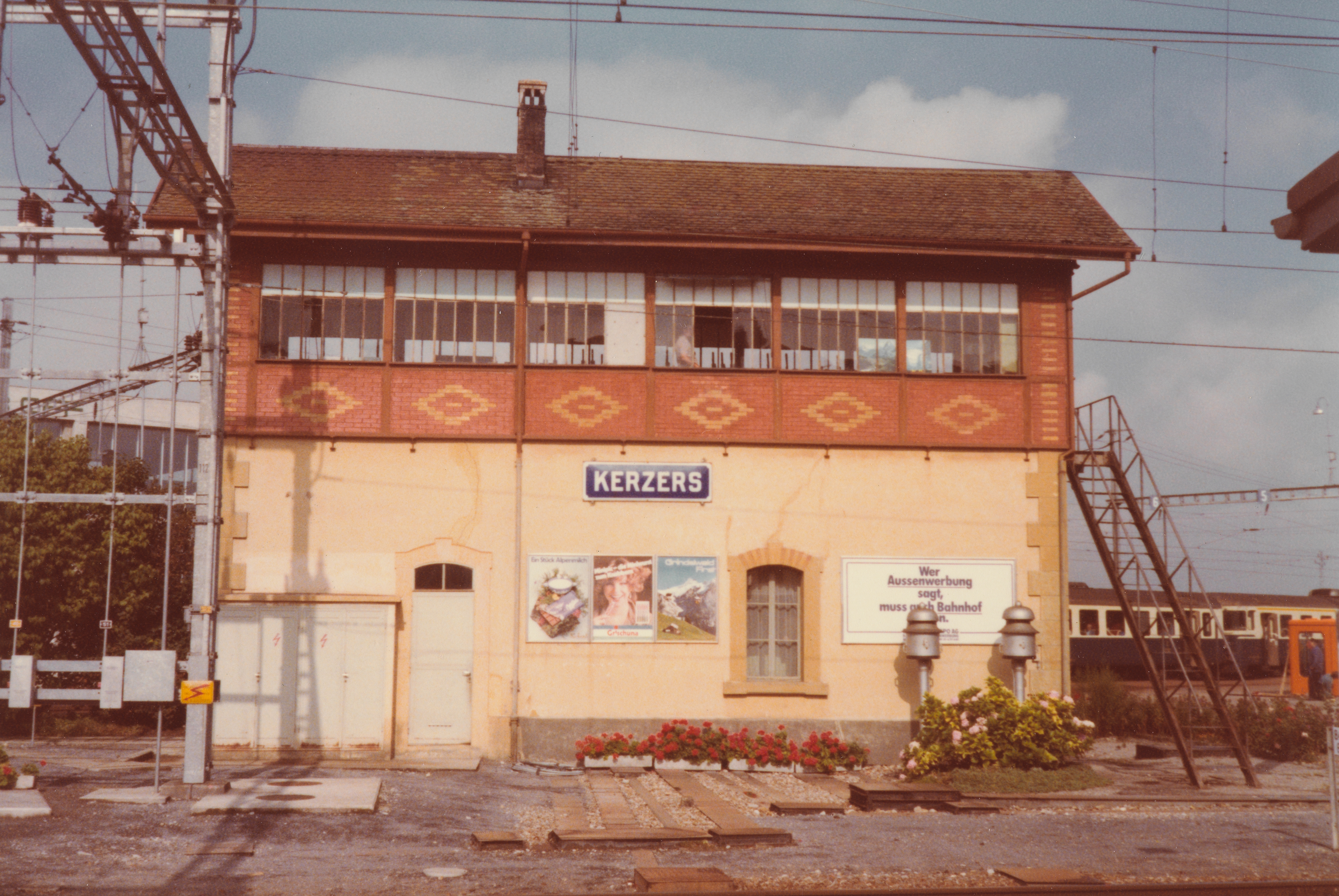
Signal box in 1979
