= Zofingen railway station =

Railway station in Zofingen, Switzerland

Zofingen
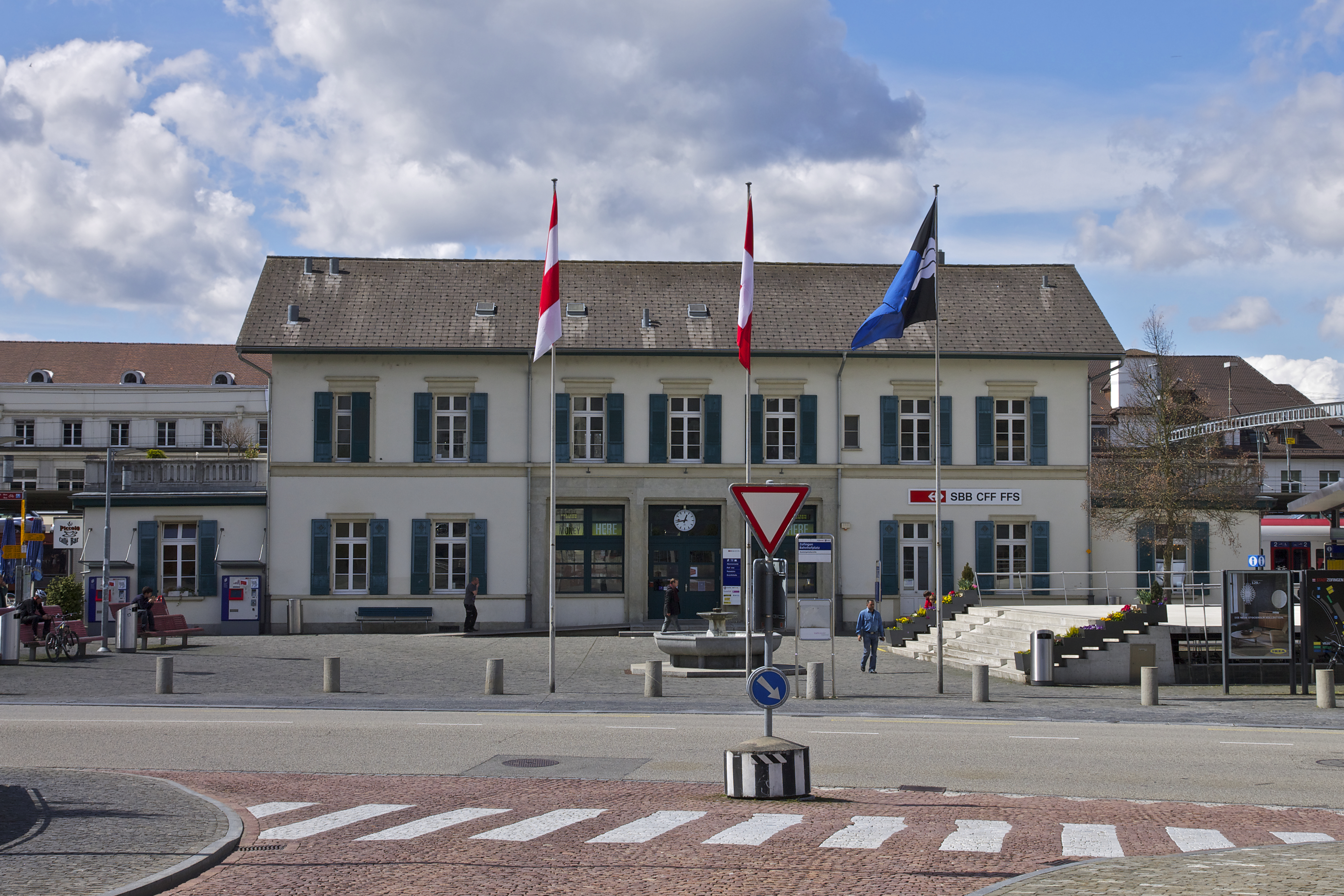
- The station building in 2013

General information
- Location: Zofingen; Switzerland
- Coordinates: 47°17′17″N 7°56′35″E
- Owner: Swiss Federal Railways
- Lines: Olten–Lucerne line; Zofingen–Wettingen line
- Distance: 47.5 km (29.5 mi) from Basel SBB
- Train operators: Swiss Federal Railways
- Connections: Aargau Verkehr buses

Passengers
- 2025: 10,100 per day (SBB, SOB)
- Rank: 75 out of 1,095 (Note: Tied with Schwerzenbach ZH railway station.)

Services
Preceding station	SBB CFF FFS	Following station
Bern towards Geneva Airport	IR 15	Sursee towards Lucerne
Olten towards Basel SBB	IR 27	Sursee towards Lucerne
Aarburg-Oftringen towards Olten	RE24	Reiden towards Lucerne
Preceding station	Aargau S-Bahn	Following station
Terminus	S28	Küngoldingen towards Lenzburg
Aarburg-Oftringen towards Turgi	S29	Brittnau-Wikon towards Sursee
Location
- Location within Switzerland Location within Canton of Aargau

Zofingen railway station (German: Bahnhof Zofingen) is a railway station in the municipality of Zofingen, in the Swiss canton of Aargau. It is located at the junction of the standard gauge Olten–Lucerne and Zofingen–Wettingen lines of Swiss Federal Railways.

== Services ==
The following services stop at Zofingen:

- InterRegio:
  - hourly service between Geneva Airport and Lucerne.
  - hourly service between Basel SBB and Lucerne.
- RegioExpress: hourly service between Olten and Lucerne.
- Aargau S-Bahn:
  - S28: half-hourly service to Lenzburg.
  - S29: hourly service between Sursee and Turgi.
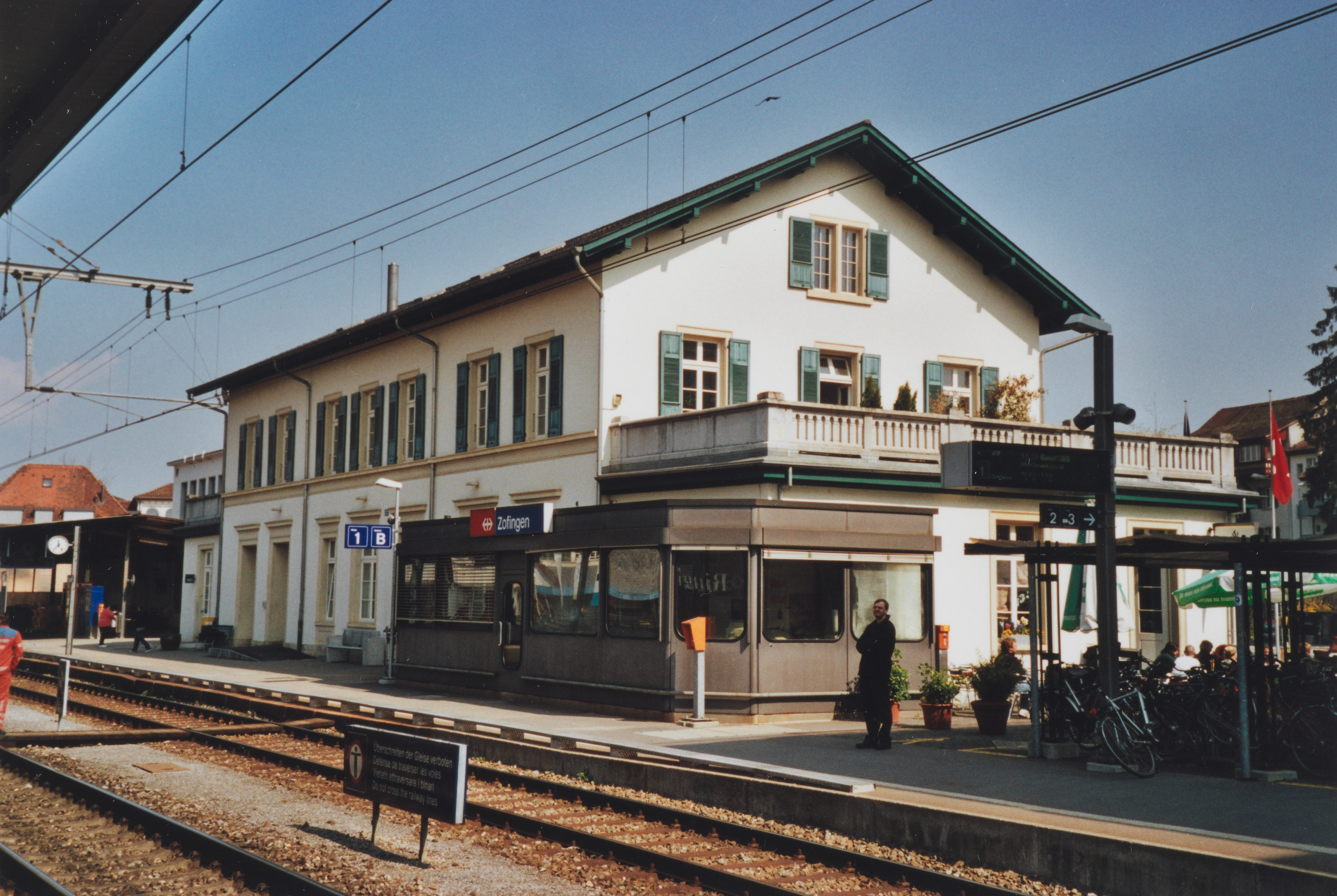
station building (2006)

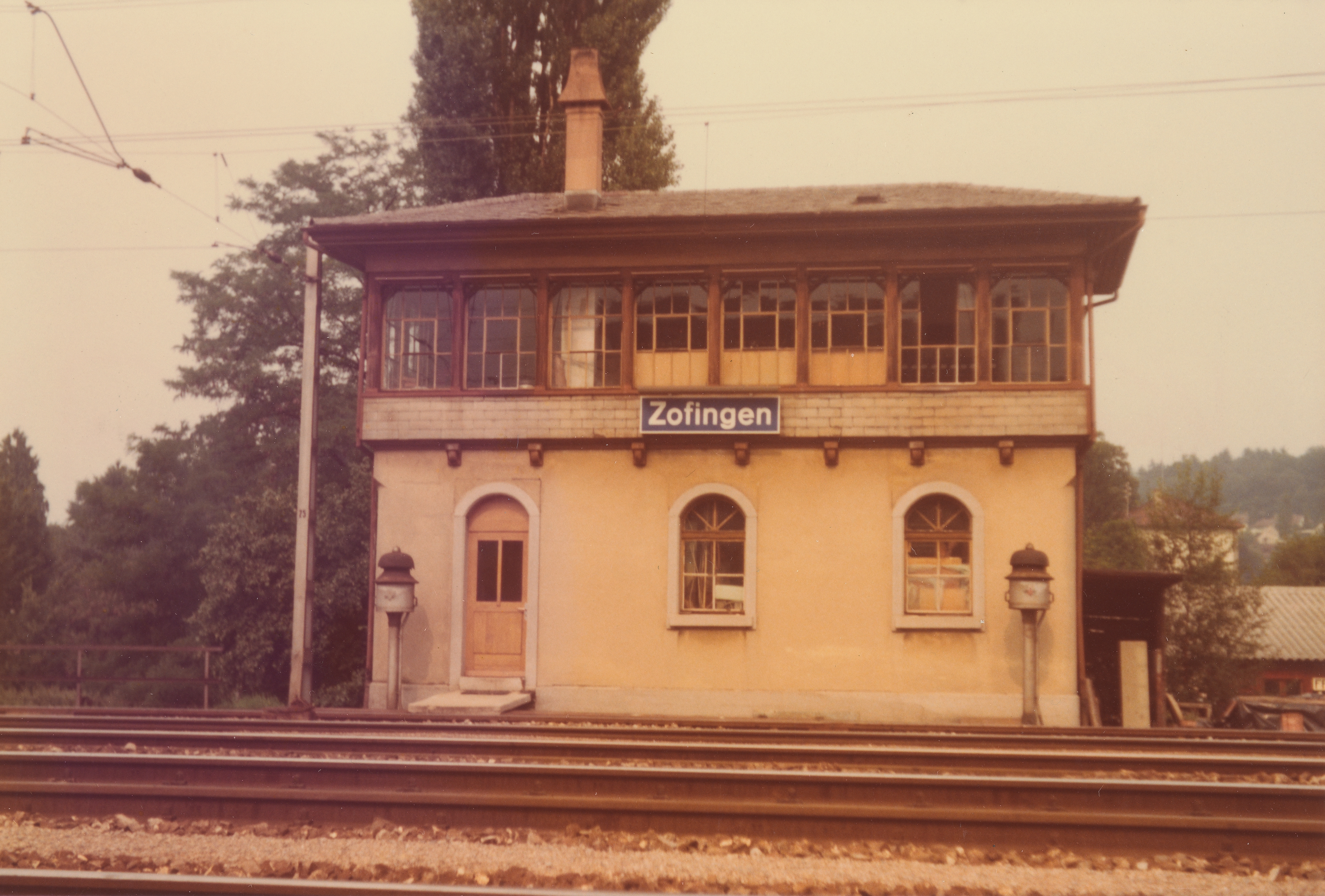
signal box (1976)

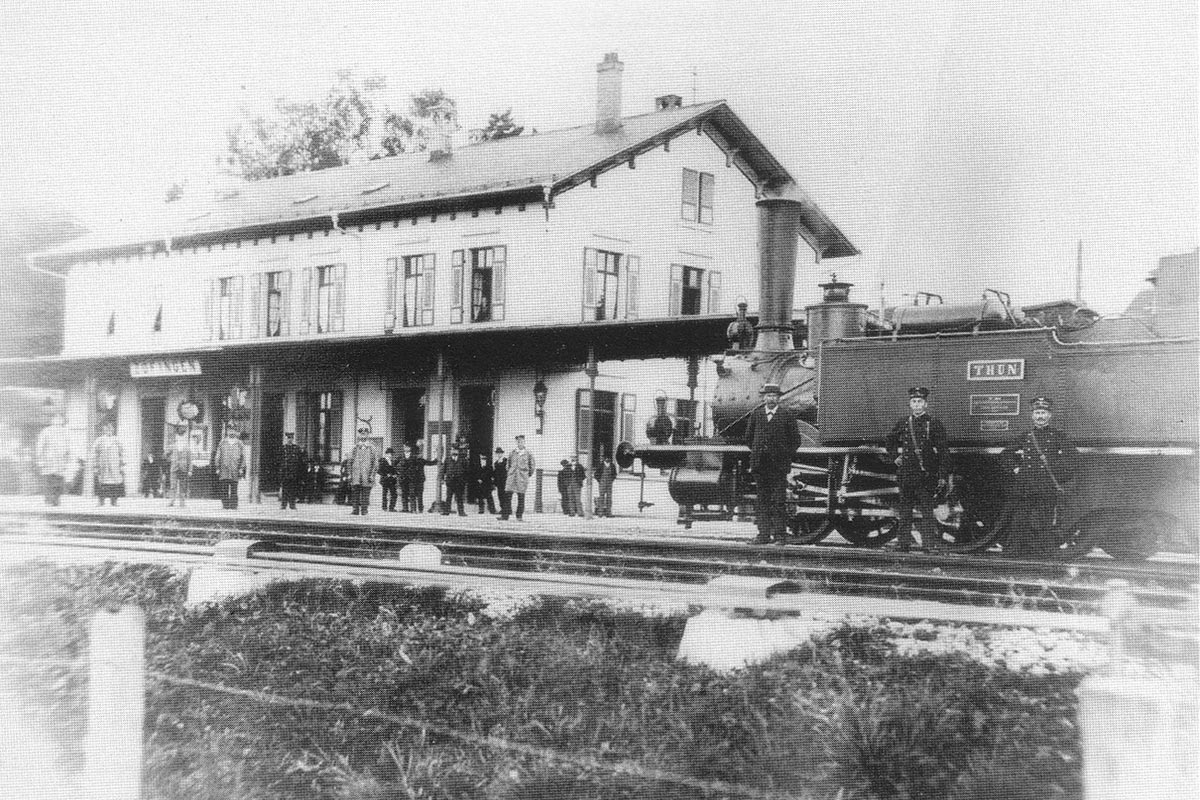
station building (1856)
