= Zofingen–Wettingen railway line =

Railway line in Switzerland

Overview
- Owner: Swiss Federal Railways
- Line number: 514 Zofingen–Lenzburg; 650.1 Lenzburg–Mägenwil
- Termini: Zofingen; Wettingen

Technical
- Line length: 41.5 km (25.8 mi)
- Number of tracks: 2: Lenzburg–Gruemet junction
- Track gauge: 1,435 mm (4 ft 8 1/2 in) standard gauge
- Electrification: 15 kV/16.7 Hz AC overhead catenary

The Zofingen–Wettingen railway line is a standard-gauge line in Switzerland. It was opened on 6 September 1877 between Zofingen and Baden Oberstadt together with the Aarau–Suhr railway by the Swiss National Railway (Schweizerische Nationalbahn; SNB). The opening of the adjacent Baden Oberstadt–Wettingen section together with the Wettingen–Effretikon railway, which represented its continuation to the east, was delayed until 15 October 1877 due to construction delays at the Limmat bridge. The SNB went bankrupt in 1878, after which the line was acquired by the Swiss Northeastern Railway (Schweizerische Nordostbahn; NOB) from the bankrupt estate. The NOB became part of the Swiss Federal Railways with the nationalisation of the company in 1902.

== History ==
The line was built by the SNB with one track and was intended to compete with the Baden–Aarau railway of the NOB. The SNB wanted the line from Lake Constance (Bodensee) to western Switzerland to be as short as possible and it therefore passed economically significant places, but it was planned to connect Zothingen to Solothurn, which was already connected to Olten by the Gäu Railway (Gäubahn) of the network of the Swiss Central Railway (Schweizerische Centralbahn; SCB).

The lack of traffic due to competition from existing rail companies and the economic crisis triggered by the Panic of 1873 (or Gründerkrach, German for "foundation crash", referring to the foundation of the German Empire in 1871) caused the SNB to declare bankruptcy after only four months of continuous operation, after which the NOB acquired its network from the bankrupt estate on 1 October 1880. The Zofingen–Suhr section was sold to the SCB.

As part of the electrification of the former Aargau Southern Railway, the Lenzburg–Gexi section was wired on 5 May 1927, followed by the Gexi–Othmarsingen section on 28 May 1932 and the Zofingen–Suhr–(Aarau) section on 6 July 1946. Special barriers had to be installed at the two intersections with the Wynental and Suhrental Railway (WSB), since that railway was electrified at 750 volts DC. The Suhr–Lenzburg and Othmarsingen–Wettingen sections were electrified on 17 December 1946, completing the electrification of the whole Zofingen–Wettingen line.

== Route ==
The line runs from Zofingen via Striegel to Suhr and thus bypasses the area around Olten in the canton of Solothurn. The Solothurn village of Walterswil is served by the station of Walterswil-Striegel which lies just into the canton of Aargau. A line to Aarau branched off in Suhr, which was closed in 2004, so that its route could be used for a relocated metre-gauge line of the WSB. From Suhr, the line continues to Lenzburg and then, along with the Rupperswil–Immensee railway line, runs on an embankment over the Aabach and the former route of the Seetal Railway (Seetalbahn) to Wildegg, continuing via Othmarsingen, Mellingen and Baden Oberstadt to Wettingen.

The Reuss Bridge, which was built by the SNB near Mellingen was the first large-scale construction by Bell Maschinenfabrik. The original, single-track steel truss bridge was replaced by a composite bridge in 1973 because the line from Lenzburg to the new junction at Gruemet needed to be upgraded to a double-track main line as part of the project to build the Heitersberg Tunnel, which opened in 1975. The new line branches off towards the Heitersberg Tunnel from the line towards Wettingen in Gruemet, to the east of the Reuss bridge at Mellingen.

== Operations ==
Passenger traffic from Lenzburg to Wettingen over the national railway line was discontinued in 2007. The Gruemet–Wettingen line is only used regularly by freight traffic to serve the Mellingen tank farm and the sidings in Baden Oberstadt. If the Heitersberg Tunnel is closed due to maintenance work or single-track operation is necessary, it is still used as a backup route (mostly running from west to east).

The Lenzburg–Zofingen section is served every half an hour until 8 pm, then every hour, by line S28 of the Aargau S-Bahn and is commonly referred to as the Nazeli (from Nationalbahn).

The whole line has been approved for D4 freight traffic (22.5 t axle load, 8.0 t/m linear load) since 5 July 2009.

Regular freight service between Mellingen and Wettingen resumed in 2024.
