= List of narrow-gauge railways in Switzerland =

Switzerland has an extensive collection of narrow-gauge railways, almost all of which are metre gauge and electrified with different voltages. Most lines have at least one interchange station with the standard gauge Swiss Federal Railways or Bern–Lötschberg–Simplon railway.

== List of companies and lines ==
The cantons listed below are the principal areas of operation, but some lines may extend into parts of neighbouring cantons and countries:

=== Canton of Aargau ===
- Aargau Verkehr operates:
  - Menziken–Aarau–Schöftland line, formerly operated by the Wynental and Suhrental Railway. Services are operated as Aargau S-Bahn route S14.
  - Bremgarten–Dietikon line, formerly operated by BDWM Transport. Services are operated as Zürich S-Bahn route S17.
  - The company also operates services on the Limmattal light rail line since December 2022.

=== Cantons of Appenzell Innerrhoden, Appenzell Ausserrhoden and St. Gallen ===
- Appenzell Railways, including:
  - Altstätten–Gais railway line S24
  - Appenzell–St. Gallen–Trogen railway S20 S21 S22
  - Gossau–Wasserauen railway line S23

=== Canton of Basel-Landschaft ===
- Baselland Transport, including:
  - Line 10 (BLT)
  - Waldenburg railway - reopened in December 2022 after a 19-month conversion from 750 mm track gauge to 1000 mm gauge

=== Canton of Basel-Stadt ===
- Trams in Basel

=== Canton of Bern ===
- Allmendhubelbahn - funicular
- Bernese Oberland Railway
- Biel–Täuffelen–Ins railway
- Brienz Rothorn Railway - 800 mm track gauge, not electrified and most trains operated by steam
- Jungfrau Railway
- Langenthal-Jura Railway
- Langenthal–Melchnau railway line
- Lauterbrunnen–Mürren Mountain Railway
- Meiringen–Innertkirchen Railway - operated by the Zentralbahn
- Niesen Funicular
- Schynige Platte Railway
- Regionalverkehr Bern-Solothurn (RBS), including:
  - Zollikofen–Bern railway
- Trams in Bern
- Wengernalp Railway - 800 mm track gauge
- Funiculars:
  - Gelmer Funicular
  - Giessbachbahn
  - Gurten Funicular
  - Harderbahn - in Interlaken
  - Reichenbachfall Funicular
- Closed lines:
  - Trams in Biel/Bienne (closed 1948)
  - Meiringen–Reichenbach–Aareschlucht tramway (closed 1956)
  - Steffisburg–Thun–Interlaken tramway (closed 1958, converted to trolleybus and later to a bus service)

=== Canton of Geneva ===
- Trams in Geneva
- Geneva (Chantepoulet) – Ferney (France) - Gex (France) tramway - closed in 1938 and replaced by a bus service

=== Canton of Fribourg ===
- Transports publics Fribourgeois, including:
  - Chemins de fer électriques de la Gruyère
  - Gruyère–Fribourg–Morat railway
  - Châtel-St-Denis–Palézieux railway

=== Canton of Glarus ===
- Braunwaldbahn - funicular
- Sernftal tramway (closed 1969)

=== Canton of Grisons ===
- Rhätische Bahn (RhB) - the longest metre-gauge railway in Switzerland, linking Arosa, Disentis, Davos, St. Moritz in the high Alps, and Tirano in Italy with Chur, including:
  - Albula Railway
  - Bernina railway
  - Bever–Scuol-Tarasp railway
  - Davos Platz–Filisur railway
  - Chur–Arosa railway
  - Reichenau-Tamins–Disentis/Mustér railway
  - Landquart–Thusis railway
  - Samedan–Pontresina railway

=== Cantons of Grisons, Uri and Valais ===
- Matterhorn Gotthard Bahn (MGB)
  - Links with the RhB at Disentis, to Andermatt (with a branch to Goeschenen), Brig and Zermatt. The line includes several sections of rack railway. The MGB was created in by the merger in 2003 of the Furka Oberalp Bahn and BVZ Zermatt-Bahn. The MGB operates the Glacier Express jointly with the RhB.
- Furka Steam Railway - a preserved railway formerly part of what is now the MGB, not electrified and most trains operated by steam
- Treib–Seelisberg railway - funicular in Canton of Uri
- Altdorf–Flüelen tramway (closed 1951, Canton of Uri)

=== Canton of Jura ===
- Chemins de fer du Jura, including:
  - La Chaux-de-Fonds–Glovelier line, including the former Régional Saignelégier–Glovelier
  - Saignelégier–La Chaux-de-Fonds Railway, former railway
  - Tavannes–Noirmont railway
- La Traction - preservation group

=== Cantons of Lucerne, Nidwalden, Obwalden and Bern ===
- Brünig railway line - operated by the Zentralbahn
- Luzern–Stans–Engelberg railway line - including the Grafenort – Engelberg Tunnel, operated by the Zentralbahn
- Pilatus Railway - 800 mm track gauge, operating in the Canton of Obwalden
- Bürgenstock Funicular - Canton of Nidwalden
- Sonnenberg Funicular - funicular at Kriens near Lucerne

=== Canton of Neuchâtel ===
- La Chaux-de-Fonds–Glovelier line
- La Chaux-de-Fonds–Les Ponts-de-Martel railway
- Saignelégier–La Chaux-de-Fonds Railway
- Le Locle–Les Brenets line
- Trams in Neuchâtel

=== Canton of Schwyz ===
- Rigi–Scheidegg railway (closed 1931)

=== Canton of Solothurn ===
- Aare Seeland mobil, including:
  - Oberaargau-Jura Railways
  - Solothurn–Niederbipp railway
  - Solothurn–Worblaufen railway
- Regionalverkehr Bern-Solothurn (RBS)

=== Cantons of Thurgau and St. Gallen ===
- Frauenfeld–Wil railway S15

=== Canton of Ticino ===
- Centovalli railway - between Domodossola in Italy and Locarno
- Lugano–Ponte Tresa Railway S60
- Monte Generoso railway - 800 mm track gauge
- Funiculars:
  - Lugano Città–Stazione funicular
  - Locarno–Madonna del Sasso funicular
  - Monte Brè funicular
  - Monte San Salvatore funicular
  - Ritom funicular
- Closed lines:
  - Bellinzona–Mesocco railway (closed 2013)
  - Lugano degli Angioli funicular (closed 1986)
  - Lugano–Cadro–Dino railway (closed 1970)
  - Lugano–Tesserete railway (closed 1967)
  - Mendrisio electric tramway (closed 1950)
  - Trams in Lugano (closed 1964)

=== Canton of Valais ===
- Gornergrat Railway
- Jungfrau Railway
- Matterhorn Gotthard Bahn (MGB) - see entry above
- Transports de Martigny et Régions, including:
  - Martigny–Châtelard Railway (MC) - 19 km long, with one rack railway section
- Riffelalp tram - 800 mm track gauge
- Zermatt–Sunnegga Funicular

=== Canton of Vaud ===
- Chemin de fer Nyon-St-Cergue-Morez
- Chemin de fer Bière-Apples-Morges
- Chemin de fer Yverdon–Ste-Croix
- Chemin de fer Lausanne–Echallens–Bercher
- Montreux–Lenk im Simmental line
- Transports Publics du Chablais, including:
  - Aigle–Leysin railway line
  - Aigle–Ollon–Monthey–Champéry railway
  - Aigle–Sépey–Diablerets railway
  - Chemin de fer Bex–Villars–Bretaye
  - Monthey–Champéry–Morgins railway
- Blonay–Chamby museum railway
- Transports Montreux–Vevey–Riviera
- Vevey–Chardonne–Mont Pèlerin funicular railway
- Vevey–Montreux–Chillon–Villeneuve tramway (closed in 1958 and replaced by a trolleybus service)
- Chemins de fer électriques Veveysans
- Territet–Glion funicular railway - funicular
- Cossonay–Gare–Ville funicular
- Les Avants–Sonloup funicular
- Clarens–Chailly–Blonay Railway (closed 1955)

=== Canton of Zürich ===
- Dolderbahn - rack railway in Zürich
- Forch railway S18
- Funicular Rigiblick
- Glattalbahn
- Limmattal light rail line
- Trams in Zürich
- Closed lines:
  - Limmattal tramway (closed 1955)
  - Trams in Winterthur (closed)
  - Uster–Oetwil tramway (closed 1949)
  - Wetzikon–Meilen tramway (closed 1950)

== Trams ==
There are trams operating on nine systems in seven Swiss cities. Street-running tramways are nearly all 1,000 mm (3 ft 3 3/8 in). The Chemin de fer Bex–Villars–Bretaye (BVB) in Bex is more of a mixed interurban light rail line connected to a rack railway but it does have some street running portions, particularly in Bex where the BVB operates along the right of way of a tramway system originally built in the 1890s.

City	System	Start of electric operations	Gauge	notes
Basel	Basler Verkehrs-Betriebe (BVB)	6 May 1892	1,000 mm (3 ft 3 3/8 in) metre gauge	8 lines
Basel	Baselland Transport (BLT)	6 October 1902	1,000 mm (3 ft 3 3/8 in) metre gauge	4 lines, 65.2 km (40.5 mi), 100 trams, serves suburbs
Bern	Städtische Verkehrsbetriebe Bern	1 July 1902	1,000 mm (3 ft 3 3/8 in) metre gauge	
Bex	Bex–Villars–Bretaye railway (BVB)	1898	1,000 mm (3 ft 3 3/8 in) metre gauge	connects to rack railway in Villars-sur-Ollon
Geneva	Transports Publics Genevois	22 September 1894	1,000 mm (3 ft 3 3/8 in) metre gauge	
Lausanne	Lausanne Metro Line M1	2 June 1991	1,435 mm (4 ft 8 1/2 in) standard gauge	
Neuchâtel	Trams in Neuchâtel	16 May 1897	1,000 mm (3 ft 3 3/8 in) metre gauge	
Zürich	Verkehrsbetriebe Zürich (VBZ)	8 March 1894	1,000 mm (3 ft 3 3/8 in) metre gauge	
Zürich	Stadtbahn Glattal	10 December 2006		

== See also ==
- Feldbahn
- List of heritage railways and funiculars in Switzerland
- List of highest railway stations in Switzerland
- List of mountain railways in Switzerland
- List of rack railways
- Mountain railway
- Rail transport in Switzerland
- Saignelégier–La Chaux-de-Fonds Railway
