= List of railway companies in Switzerland =

The following is a list of railway companies which operate routes on Swiss territory.

== Standard gauge ==
The following is a complete list of all 1,435 mm (4 ft 8 1/2 in) standard gauge railway companies which operate routes on Swiss territory. It also includes routes of foreign railway companies (e.g. Deutsche Bahn), but not routes of Swiss companies in neighbouring countries.

Not included are railway companies which do not operate their own routes (e.g. Cisalpino, Hupac or the former Lokoop) as well as operators of short connecting goods lines.

If there is no abbreviation shown, it means that this company always appears with its full name.

=== Companies in operation today (standard gauge) ===
Company	Abbreviation	Since	Notes
Appenzeller Bahnen	AB	2006	Merger of Appenzeller Bahnen, Trogenerbahn (both 1,000 mm / 3 ft 3 3/8 in gauge), Rorschach-Heiden-Bahn (rack, full interchange) and Rheineck-Walzenhausen-Bahn (1,200 mm / 3 ft 11 1/4 in)
BDWM Transport	BDWM	1997	Merger of Bremgarten-Dietikon-Bahn and Wohlen-Meisterschwanden-Bahn, 1,000 mm / 3 ft 3 3/8 in gauge passenger traffic, 1,435 mm / 4 ft 8 1/2 in gauge for freight: Wohlen - Villmergen and Wohlen - Bremgarten West (dual gauge, still owned by SBB)
BLS AG	BLS	2006	Merger of BLS Lötschbergbahn and Regionalverkehr Mittelland
Chemins de fer du Jura	CJ	1944	Mostly 1,000 mm (3 ft 3 3/8 in) gauge
Dampfbahn-Verein Zürcher Oberland	DVZO	2000	Bäretswil-Bauma, heritage railway operating since 1978
Deutsche Bahn	DB AG	1994	Operates railway lines around Schaffhausen and Basel, owned by the German state
Emmentalbahn	ETB	2014	Sumiswald-Grünen–Huttwil; Sumiswald-Grünen–Wasen im Emmental
Ferrovie dello Stato Italiane (now called Trenitalia)	FS	1992	Passenger services: Trenitalia; only a few meters into Switzerland at Chiasso
Hafenbahn Schweiz	HBSAG	2011	Merger of former Hafenbahn des Kantons Basel-Stadt in Kleinhüningen and former Hafenbahn des Kantons Basel-Landschaft in Au and Birsfelden. Freight only, 2 separate networks
Oensingen-Balsthal-Bahn	OeBB	1899	
Österreichische Bundesbahnen	ÖBB	1947	from the Rhine bridges to Buchs and St. Margrethen, owned by the Austrian state
RegionAlps	RA	2003	
Rigi Bahnen	RB	1992	Rack railway, very restricted interchange
SBB-CFF-FFS	SBB CFF FFS	1902	Company since 1999, fully owned by the Swiss Confederation
Südostbahn	SOB	2001	Merger
Sihltal Zürich Uetliberg Bahn	SZU	1973	
SNCF	SNCF	1938	train services to Basel and Geneva, no tracks owned
Sursee-Triengen-Bahn	ST	1912	Passenger service discontinued, goods traffic only
Tramway du sud-ouest lausannois	TL	2012	Métro and rubber-tyred metro, small profile, TSOL and LO until 2012
THURBO		2002	90% Subsidiary of SBB
Transports de Martigny et Régions	TMR	2001	Partly 1,000 mm (3 ft 3 3/8 in) gauge
Transports publics Fribourgeois	TPF	2000	Partly 1,000 mm (3 ft 3 3/8 in) gauge
Transports publics Neuchâtelois	transN	2012	Partly 1,000 mm (3 ft 3 3/8 in) gauge
Transports Vallée de Joux - Yverdon-les-Bains - Ste-Croix	TRAVYS	2001	Partly 1,000 mm (3 ft 3 3/8 in) gauge

=== All companies ===
Company	Abbreviation	From	Until	Notes
AlpTransit Gotthard	ATG	1998		building company, subsidiary of SBB, no public railway tracks currently
BLS AG	BLS	2006		
BLS Lötschbergbahn	BLS	1996		
Bern-Lötschberg-Simplon-Bahn	BLS	1907	1996	
Spiez-Frutigen-Bahn	SFB	1901	1906	
Thunerseebahn	TSB	1893	1912	
Bödelibahn	BB	1872	1900	
Bern-Neuenburg-Bahn	BN	1901	1996	
Gürbetal-Bern-Schwarzenburg-Bahn	GBS	1944	1996	
Bern-Schwarzenburg-Bahn	BSB	1907	1943	
Gürbetalbahn	GTB	1901	1943	
Spiez-Erlach-Zweisimmen-Bahn	SEZ	1942	1996	Also known as Simmentalbahn
Erlenbach-Zweisimmen-Bahn	EZB	1902	1941	
Spiez-Erlenbach-Bahn	SEB	1897	1941	
Regionalverkehr Mittelland	RM	1997	2006	
Emmental-Burgdorf-Thun-Bahn	EBT	1942	1996	
Burgdorf-Thun-Bahn	BTB	1899	1941	
Emmentalbahn	EB	1875	1941	
Schweizerische Centralbahn	SCB	(1876)	(1883)	Section Solothurn-Biberist EBT
Solothurn-Münster Bahn	SMB	1908	1996	
Vereinigte Huttwil-Bahnen	VHB	1944	1996	
Huttwil-Wolhusen-Bahn	HWB	1895	1943	
Langenthal-Huttwil-Bahn	LHB	1927	1943	
Langenthal-Huttwil-Bahn	LHB	1889	1926	
Huttwil-Eriswil-Bahn	HEB	1915	1926	
Ramsei-Sumiswald-Huttwil-Bahn	RSHB	1908	1943	
Chemin de fer de l'Etat de Genève	CFEG	1888		Genève-Eaux-Vives–Annemasse, operated by SNCF on behalf of the canton. After construction of the Eaux-Vives–La Praille link, it will become the property of the SBB
Chemins de fer du Jura	CJ	1944		partly narrow gauge
Régional Porrentruy-Bonfol	RPB	1901	1943	
Régional Saignelégier-Glovelier	RSG	1904	1943	Narrow gauge since 1953
Chemin de fer Vevey-Chexbres	VCh	1904		Route leased to SBB
Dampfbahn-Verein Zürcher Oberland	DVZO	2000		Bäretswil-Bauma, heritage railway operating since 1978
SBB-CFF-FFS	SBB	1947	(2000)	Bäretswil-Bauma, transferred to DVZO in 2000
Uerikon-Bauma-Bahn	UeBB	1901	1948	
Deutsche Bahn	DB AG	1994		Around Schaffhausen and Basel, tracks owned by the German state
Deutsche Bundesbahn	DB	1952	1994	
Betriebsvereinigung der Südwestdeutschen Eisenbahnen	SWDE	1948	1952	Under sequestration
Deutsche Eisenbahn-Strecken in der Schweiz	DR	1945	1948	Under sequestration
Deutsche Reichsbahn	DRB	1937	1945	
Deutsche Reichsbahn-Gesellschaft	DRG	1924	1937	
Deutsche Reichseisenbahnen		1920	1924	
Großherzoglich Badische Staatseisenbahnen	BadStB	1855	1920	
Wiesentalbahn		1862	1889	Integrated into BadStB in 1889
Ferrovie dello Stato	FS	1992		Passenger services: Trenitalia
Ente Ferrovie dello Stato	FS	1905	1991	
Strade ferrate meridionali	SFM	1885	1905	
Società ferroviaria dell'Alta Italia	SFAI	1876	1885	
Hafenbahn Schweiz AG		2010		
Hafenbahn des Kantons Basel-Stadt	HBS	1924	2010	Kleinhüningen, St. Johann, freight only
Hafenbahn des Kantons Basel-Landschaft	HBL	1940	2010	Au, Birsfelden, freight only
Kriens-Luzern-Bahn	KLB	1886		Passenger service discontinued, goods traffic only
Métro Lausanne-Ouchy	LO	1877		Funicular before 1958
Oensingen-Balsthal-Bahn	OeBB	1899		
Österreichische Bundesbahnen	ÖBB	1947		Around Buchs and St. Margrethen
Österreichische Staatseisenbahnen	ÖStB	1945	1947	
Deutsche Eisenbahn-Strecken in der Schweiz	DR	1945	1945	Under sequestration
Deutsche Reichsbahn	DR	1938	1945	
Bundesbahnen Österreichs	BBÖ	1921	1938	
Österreichische Staatsbahnen	ÖStB	1919	1921	
Kaiserlich-königliche österreichische Staatsbahnen	KKÖStB	1885	1919	
Vorarlbergerbahn	VB	1872	1885	
Rigi Bahnen	RB	1992		
Arth-Rigi-Bahn	ARB	1873	1992	
Vitznau-Rigi-Bahn	VRB	1969	1992	Change of name
Rigi Bahn	RB	1871	1969	
Rorschach-Heiden-Bahn	RHB	1875	2006	Merged with Appenzeller Bahnen in 2006
SBB-CFF-FFS	SBB CFF FFS	1902		
Aargauische Südbahn	AS	1874	1901	
Bötzbergbahn		1875	1902	
Genève-La Plaine		1894	1912	
Paris-Lyon-Méditerranée	PLM	1862	(1894)	
Lyon-Genève	LG	1858	1862	
Chemin de fer Vevey-Chexbres	VCh	1904	2013	Route leased to SBB
Gotthardbahn	GB	1874	1909	
Jura neuchâtelois	JN	1886	1913	
Jura-Bern-Lucerne-Bahn	JBL	1884	(1886)	Neuchâtel-Le Locle Col des Roches
Chemin de fer Jura-Simplon	JS	1890	1903	
Jura-Bern-Lucerne-Bahn	JBL	1884	1889	Neuchâtel-Le Locle Col des Roches to JN in 1886
Bern-Luzern-Bahn	BLB	1875	1884	
Bernische Staatsbahn	BSB	1861	(1875)	Gümligen-Langnau
Schweizerische Ostwestbahn		1860	1861	
Jura bernois	JB	1874	1884	
Jura industriel	JI	1857	1875	
Porrentruy-Delle	PD	1872	1876	
Bernische Staatsbahn	BSB	1861	1877	Gümligen-Langnau to BLB in 1875
Schweizerische Ostwestbahn		1860	1861	
Chemin de fer Pont-Vallorbe	PV	1886	1890	
Suisse Occidentale-Simplon	SOS	1881	1889	
Suisse-Occidentale	SO	1872	1881	
Franco-Suisse	FS	1859	1871	
Lausanne-Fribourg-Berne	LFB	1858	1871	
Genève-Versoix	GV	1858	1858	
Ouest Suisse	OS	1855	1871	
Jougne-Eclépens	JE	1870	1876	
Simplon	S	1874	1881	
Ligne d'italie	LI	1859	1874	
Schweizerische Centralbahn	SCB	1854	1901	
Chemins de fer de l'Est	EST	1854	1872	Section Basel-St. Johann-Grenze
Strasbourg-Bâle		1844	1854	
Schweizerische Nordostbahn	NOB	1853	(1881)	Section Suhr-Zofingen
Schweizerische Nordostbahn	NOB	1853	1902	Suhr-Zofingen to SCB in 1881
Sulgen-Gossau (Bischofszellerbahn)	SG	1876	1885	
Bülach-Regensberg-Bahn	BR	1865	1876	
Effretikon-Wetzikon-Hinwil-Bahn	EH	1876	1885	
Schweizerische Nordbahn		1847	1853	First railway company of Switzerland
Schweizerische Nationalbahn	SNB	1875	1880	
Zürich-Zug-Luzern-Bahn	ZZL	1864	1891	
Seethalbahn	STB	1883	1922	
Sensetalbahn	STB	1904	2000	
Toggenburgerbahn	TB	1870	1902	
Tösstalbahn	TTB	1875	1917	
Uerikon-Bauma-Bahn	UeBB	1901	1948	
Vereinigte Schweizerbahnen	VSB	1857	1902	
Glatttalbahn		1856	1857	
Sankt-Gallisch-Appenzellischen Eisenbahn		1855	1857	
Schweizerische Südostbahn		1853	1857	Not to be confused with today's SOB
Wald-Rüti-Bahn	WR	1876	1902	
Wohlen-Bremgarten	WB	1876	1901	line leased to Bremgarten-Dietikon-Bahn in 1912, dual gauge
Südostbahn	SOB	2001		Fusion
Bodensee-Toggenburg-Bahn	BT	1910	2000	
Schweizerische Südostbahn	SOB	1890	2000	
Wädenswil-Einsiedeln-Bahn	WE	1877	1889	
Zürichsee-Gotthardbahn	ZGB	1878	1889	
Sihltal Zürich Uetliberg Bahn	SZU	1973		
Sihltalbahn	SiTB	1892	1972	
Bahngesellschaft Zürich-Üetliberg	BZUe	1922	1972	Change of name after bankruptcy of earlier company
Uetlibergbahn-Gesellschaft	UeB	1875	1922	
SNCF	SNCF	1938		Around Basel and Geneva
Alsace-Lorraine	AL	1918	1938	
Reichseisenbahn Elsaß-Lothringen	EL	1872	1918	
Chemins de fer de l'Est	EST	1854	1872	
Strasbourg-Bâle		1844	1854	
Paris-Lyon-Méditerranée	PLM	1862	1938	
Lyon-Genève	LG	1858	1862	
Sursee-Triengen-Bahn	ST	1912		Passenger service discontinued, goods traffic only
Tramway du sud-ouest lausannois	TOSL	1991		
THURBO		2002		Subsidiary of SBB
Mittelthurgau-Bahn	MThB	1911	2002	
SBB-CFF-FFS	SBB CFF FFS	(1902)	(2002)	Regional services in north-eastern Switzerland
Transports de Martigny et Régions	TMR	2001		Partly narrow gauge
Chemin de fer Martigny-Orsières-Le Châble	MO	1910	2001	
Transports publics Fribourgeois	TPF	2000		Partly narrow gauge
Chemins de fer Fribourgeois Gruyère-Fribourg-Morat	GFM	1942	2000	Partly narrow gauge
Chemin de fer Bulle-Romont	BR	1868	1941	
Chemin de fer Fribourg-Morat-Anet	FMA	1903	1941	
Fribourg-Morat	FM	1898	1903	
Transports Régionaux Neuchâtelois	TRN	1999		Partly narrow gauge
Chemin de fer Régional du Val-de-Travers	RVT	1883	1998	
Transports Vallée de Joux - Yverdon-les-Bains - Ste-Croix	TRAVYS	2001		
Chemin de fer Orbe-Chavornay	OC	1894	2000	
Chemin de fer Pont-Brassus	PBr	1899	2000	
Wohlen-Meisterschwanden-Bahn	WM	1916	1997	† merged with BD to BDWM Transport on 31 May 1997

== Narrow gauge ==
=== All companies ===
Company	Abbreviations	From	Until	Notes
Appenzell Railways	AB	1988		
Appenzellerbahn	AB	1885	1988	
Appenzell-Weissbad-Wasserauen Bahn	AWW	1940	1947	Name change
Säntisbahn	SB	1912	1939	
Schweizerische Gesellschaft für Localbahnen	SLB	1875	1885	
Elektrische Bahn St. Gallen - Gais - Appenzell	SGA	1947	1988	
Altstätten-Gais-Bahn	AG	1911	1947	
Elektrische Bahn St. Gallen - Gais - Appenzell	SGA	1931	1947	
Appenzeller-Strassenbahn-Gesellschaft	ASt	1889	1931	
Trogenerbahn	TB	1903		
Verkehrsbetriebe der Stadt St. Gallen	VBSG	1950	1957	Tramway discontinued, section to TB
Trambahn der Stadt St. Gallen	TrStG	1897	1950	† 1 October 1957
Rorschach-Heiden-Bahn	RHB	1875	2006	Standard gauge
Bergbahn Rheineck-Walzenhausen	RhW	1896		1,200 mm (47.2 in) gauge, now part of Appenzell Railways
Aare Seeland mobil	ASm	1999		Merger
Biel–Täuffelen–Ins-Bahn	BTI	1945	1999	
Seeländische Lokalbahnen	SLB	1916	1945	
Regionalverkehr Oberaargau	RVO	1990	1999	
Oberaargau-Jura Bahn	OJB	1958	1990	
Langenthal-Jura Bahn	LJB	1907	1958	
Langenthal–Melchnau-Bahn	LMB	1917	1958	
Solothurn-Niederbipp Bahn	SNB	1918	1999	
Chemin de fer Bière-Apples-Morges	BAM	1895		
Chemin de fer Apples-L'Isle	AL	1896	1899	
Museumsbahn Blonay-Chamby	BC	1968		
Chemins de fer électriques Veveysans	CEV	1902	(1968)	Blonay-Chamby to BC in 1968
BDWM Transport	BDWM	2000		Merger with WM
Bremgarten-Dietikon-Bahn	BD	1902	2000	
Bergbahn Lauterbrunnen-Mürren	BLM	1891		
Baselland Transport AG	BLT	1974		
Birseckbahn	BEB	1902	1974	
Birsigtalbahn	BTB	1887	1974	
Basellandschaftliche Ueberlandbahn	BUeB	1921	1974	
Trambahn Basel-Aesch	TBA	1907	1974	
Biel-Meinisberg Bahn	BMB	1913	1940	† 30 June 1940
Berner Oberland Bahn	BOB	1890		
Schynige Platte-Bahn	SPB	1893	1895	
Brienz-Rothorn-Bahn	BRB	1892		
Chemins de fer du Jura	CJ	1944		
Chemin de fer Tavannes-Le Noirmont	CTN	1927	1943	
Chemin de fer Tramelan-Les Breuleux-Le Noirmont	TBN	1913	1927	
Chemin de fer Tavannes-Tramelan	TT	1884	1927	
Régional Saignelégier-Glovelier	RSG	1904	1943	Standard gauge before 1953
Chemin de fer Saignelégier-La Chaux-de-Fonds	SC	1892	1943	
Clarens-Chailly-Blonay	CCB	1911	1955	
Dampfbahn Furka-Bergstrecke	DFB	1987		
Furka Oberalp Bahn	FO	1925	(1987)	Section Gletsch-Furka
Furka Oberalp Bahn	FO	1925	(1989)	Section Furka-Realp
Ferrovie Autolinee Regionali Ticinesi	FART	1961		Change of name
Ferrovie regionali ticinesi	FRT	1923	1961	Centovalli Railway
Locarno - Ponte Brolla - Bignasco	LPB	1907	1948	Maggia Valley Railway † 29 November 1965
Società tramvie elettriche locarnesi	STL	1908	1922	Tramway Locarno † 30 April 1960
Forchbahn	FB	1912		
Ferrovia Lugano-Cadro-Dino	LCD	1911	1970	
Ferrovia Lugano-Ponte Tresa	FLP	1912		
Ferrovia Lugano-Tesserete	LT	1909	1967	
Ferrovia Biasca-Acquarossa	BA	1911	1973	
Ferrovia Mesolcinese	FM	2003		Heritage railway (since 1995)
Rhätische Bahn	RhB	1895	(2003)	Castione-Cama to Ferrovia Mesolcinese
Societa Ferrovia elettrica Bellinzona-Mesocco	BM	1907	1941	Bellinzona-Castione -Cama-Mesocco
Frauenfeld-Wil-Bahn	FW	1887		
Gornergrat-Monte Rosa-Bahnen	GGB	1997		Change of name
Gornergrat-Bahn	GGB	1889	1997	
Jungfraubahn	JB	1898		
Chemin de fer Lausanne-Echallens-Bercher	LEB	1913		
Central Vaudois	CV	1889	1912	
Chemin de fer Lausanne-Echallens	LE	1873	1912	
Leuk-Leukerbad-Bahn	LLB	1915	1967	† 27. Mai 1967
Matterhorn-Gotthard-Bahn	MGB	2003		Fusion
BVZ Zermatt-Bahn	BVZ	1991	2002	Change of name
Brig-Visp-Zermatt-Bahn	BVZ	1961	1991	Change of name
Visp-Zermatt-Bahn	VZ	1890	1961,	now BVZ Zermatt-Bahn
Furka Oberalp Bahn	FO	1925	2002	
Brig-Furka-Disentis-Bahn	BFD	1915	1925	
Schöllenenbahn	SchB	1917	1961	
Meiringen-Innertkirchen Bahn	MIB	1946		Change of name
Kraftwerke Oberhasli	KWO	1926	1946	
Ferrovia Monte Generoso	MG	1890		Owned by the Migros group
Montreux-Oberland Bernois-Bahn	MOB	1901		
Transports Montreux-Vevey-Riviera	MVR	2001		Merger
Chemins de fer électriques Veveysans	CEV	1902	2001	Partial discontinuations
Chemin de fer Montreux-Territet-Glion-Rochers-de-Naye	MTGN	1992	2001	
Chemin de fer Montreux-Glion-Rochers-de-Naye	MGN	1987	1991	
Chemin de fer Glion-Rochers-de-Naye	GN	1892	1986	
Chemin de fer Montreux-Glion	MGl	1909	1986	
Chemin de fer funiculaire Territet-Glion	TG	1883	1991	
Nyon-St-Cergue-Morez	NStCM	1916		End of the line in La Cure (Swiss-French border) since 1958
Pilatusbahn	PB	1889		
Regionalverkehr Bern-Solothurn	RBS	1984		
Solothurn-Zollikofen-Bern Bahn	SZB	1922	1983	
Bern-Zollikofen Bahn	BZB	1912	1921	
Elektrische Schmalspurbahn Solothurn-Bern	ESB	1916	1921	
Vereinigte Bern-Worb Bahnen	VBW	1927	1983	
Bern-Worb Bahn	BWB	1907	1926	
Bern-Muri-Gümligen-Worb Bahn	BMGWB	1898	1907	
Worblentalbahn	WT	1913	1926	
Rhätische Bahn	RhB	1895		
Bernina-Bahngesellschaft	BB	1908	1942	
Societa Ferrovia elettrica Bellinzona-Mesocco	BM	1907	1941	† 27. Mai 1972 Bellinzona-Castione † 9 December 1979 Cama-Mesocco; Remainder to Ferrovia Mesolcinese in 2003
Chur-Arosa-Bahn	ChA	1914	1941	
Landquart-Davos-Bahn	LD	1889	1895	
Rigi-Scheidegg-Bahn	RSB	1874	1931	† 31 December 1942
Sernftalbahn	SeTB	1905	1969	† 31. Mai 1969
Società Subalpina Imprese Ferroviarie	SSIF	(1912)		Joint operation with FART
Trait-Planches	TP	1898	1912	† 11 November 1912
Transports de Martigny et Régions	TMR	2001		Partly standard gauge
Chemin de Fer de Martigny au Châtelard	MC	1906	2001	
Transports Publics du Chablais	TPC	1977		Collaboration
Chemin de fer Aigle-Leysin	AL	1900		
Chemin de fer Aigle-Ollon-Monthey-Champery	AOMC	1946		
Chemin de fer Aigle-Ollon-Monthey	AOM	1907	1945	
Chemin de fer Monthey-Champéry-Morgins	MCM	1908	1945	
Chemin de fer Aigle-Sepey-Diablerets	ASD	1913		
Chemin de fer Bex-Villars-Bretaye	BVB	1943		
Chemin de fer Bex-Gryon-Villars-Chesière	BGVC	1906	1942	
Chemin de fer Bex-Gryon-Villars	BGV	1898	1906	
Chemin de fer Villars-Bretaye	VB	1913	1942	
Transports publics Fribourgeois	TPF	2000		Partly standard gauge
Chemins de fer Fribourgeois Gruyère-Fribourg-Morat	GFM	1942	2000	Partly standard gauge
Chemins de fer électriques de la Gruyère	CEG	1903	1941	
Chemin de fer Châtel-St-Denis-Bulle-Montbovon	CBM			
Chemin de fer Châtel-St-Denis-Palézieux	CP	1901	1907	
Transports Vallée de Joux - Yverdon-les-Bains - Ste-Croix	TRAVYS	2001		Partly standard gauge
Chemin de fer Yverdon - Ste-Croix	YSteC	1893	2000	
Transports publics Neuchâtelois	transN	2012		Partly standard gauge
Transports Régionaux Neuchâtelois & Transports Régionaux Neuchâtelois	TRN	1999	2012	Partly standard gauge
Uster-Oetwil Bahn	UOe	1909	1949	† 1 October 1949
Wengernalpbahn	WAB	1893		
Waldenburgerbahn	WB	1880		
Wetzikon-Meilen Bahn	WMB	1903	1950	† 13 May 1950
Wynental- und Suhrentalbahn	WSB	1957		Marketing name since 2002: AAR bus+bahn
Aarau-Schöftland Bahn	AS	1901	1956	
Wynentalbahn	WTB	1904	1956	
Zentralbahn	ZB	2005		Merger
Luzern-Stans-Engelberg-Bahn	LSE	1964	2005	
Stansstad-Engelberg-Bahn	StEB	1898	1964	
SBB Brünig	SBB	(1903)	(2005)	Interlaken-Luzern since 1914
Jura-Simplon-Bahn	JS	1890	1903	Brienz-Luzern
Jura-Bern-Lucerne-Bahn	JBL	(1888)	1889	Brienz-Alpnachstad

== Tramways ==
- BLT Baselland Transport AG (Basel)
- BVB Basler Verkehrs-Betriebe (Basel)
- RiT Riffelalptram (Zermatt)
- SVB BERNMOBIL Städtische Verkehrsbetriebe Bern (Bern)
- TN Transports publics du littoral neuchatelois (Neuchâtel)
- TPG Transports Publics Genevois (Geneva)

Company	Abbreviation	From	Until	Notes
Verkehrsbetriebe Zürich	VBZ	1950		Change of name
Städtische Strassenbahn Zürich	StStZ	1896	1950	
Zürcher Strassenbahn Gesellschaft	(ZStG)	1882	1896	
Elektrische Strassenbahn Zürich	EStZ	1894	1896	
Industriequartier-Strassenbahn Zürich	ISZ	1898	1902	
Zentrale Zürichbergbahn	ZZB	1895	1905	
Strassenbahn Zürich-Höngg	StZH	1898	1923	
Albisgütli-Bahn	AGB	1907	1925	
Strassenbahn Zürich-Oerlikon-Seebach	ZOeS	1897	1931	
Limmattal-Strassenbahn	LSB	1900	1931	

=== Closed or merged ===
- ABB Altstätten-Berneck-Bahn (later RhStB)
- AF Strassenbahn Altdorf-Flüelen (closed 26 March 1951)
- CBV Tramway Chillon-Byron-Villeneuve (later VMCV)
- ESZ Elektrische Strassenbahnen im Kanton Zug (closed 21 May 1955)
- MRA Trambahn Meiringen-Reichenbach-Aareschlucht (closed 16 September 1956)
- RhStB Rheintalische Strassenbahn (later RhV)
- RhV Rheintalische Verkehrsbetriebe (closed 2 June 1973)
- SSS Strassenbahn Schwyz-Seewen (later SStB)
- SStB Schwyzer Strassenbahnen (closed 15 December 1963)
- StrStM Strassenbahn St. Moritz (closed 18 September 1932)
- SchSt Schaffhauser Strassenbahn (closed 6 March 1970)
- StSS Strassenbahn Schaffhausen-Schleitheim (closed 1 October 1964)
- StSt Strassenbahn Stansstad-Stans (closed)
- StStW Städtische Strassenbahn Winterthur (closed 2 November 1951)
- STI Steffisburg-Thun-Interlaken (closed 31 May 1958)
- STL Tramway Locarno (closed 30 April 1960)
- SVB Spiezer Verbindungsbahn (closed 25 September 1960)
- (TB) Tramway Bellavista (closed 31 October 1913)
- TC Tramway de La Chaux-de-Fonds (closed 15 June 1950)
- TEL Tram Lugano (closed 17 December 1959)
- TEM Tram Mendrisio (closed 31 December 1950)
- TF Tramway de Fribourg (closed 1 April 1965)
- TL Tramways lausannois (closed 6 January 1964)
- TP Tramway-funiculaire Trait-Planches (closed 11 November 1912)
- TrB Tramway de Bienne/Biel (closed 9 December 1948)
- TrL Tram Luzern (closed 11 November 1961)
- TrMB Tramway Martigny-Bourg (closed 31 December 1956)
- TStG Trambahn der Stadt St. Gallen (closed 1 October 1957)
- UOeB Uster-Oetwil-Bahn (closed 10 January 1949)
- VMC Tramway Vevey-Montreux-Chillon (later VMCV)
- VMCV Tramway Vevey-Montreux-Chillon-Villeneuve (closed 19 January 1958)
- WMB Wetzikon-Meilen-Bahn (closed 13 May 1950)
- ZBB Zuger Berg- und Strassenbahn (closed 10 May 1959)

== See also ==
- Rail transport in Switzerland
- History of rail transport in Switzerland
- List of railway companies
- Mountain railways in Switzerland
- Rack railways in Switzerland
