= Bannwil railway station =

Railway station in Bern, Switzerland

Bannwil
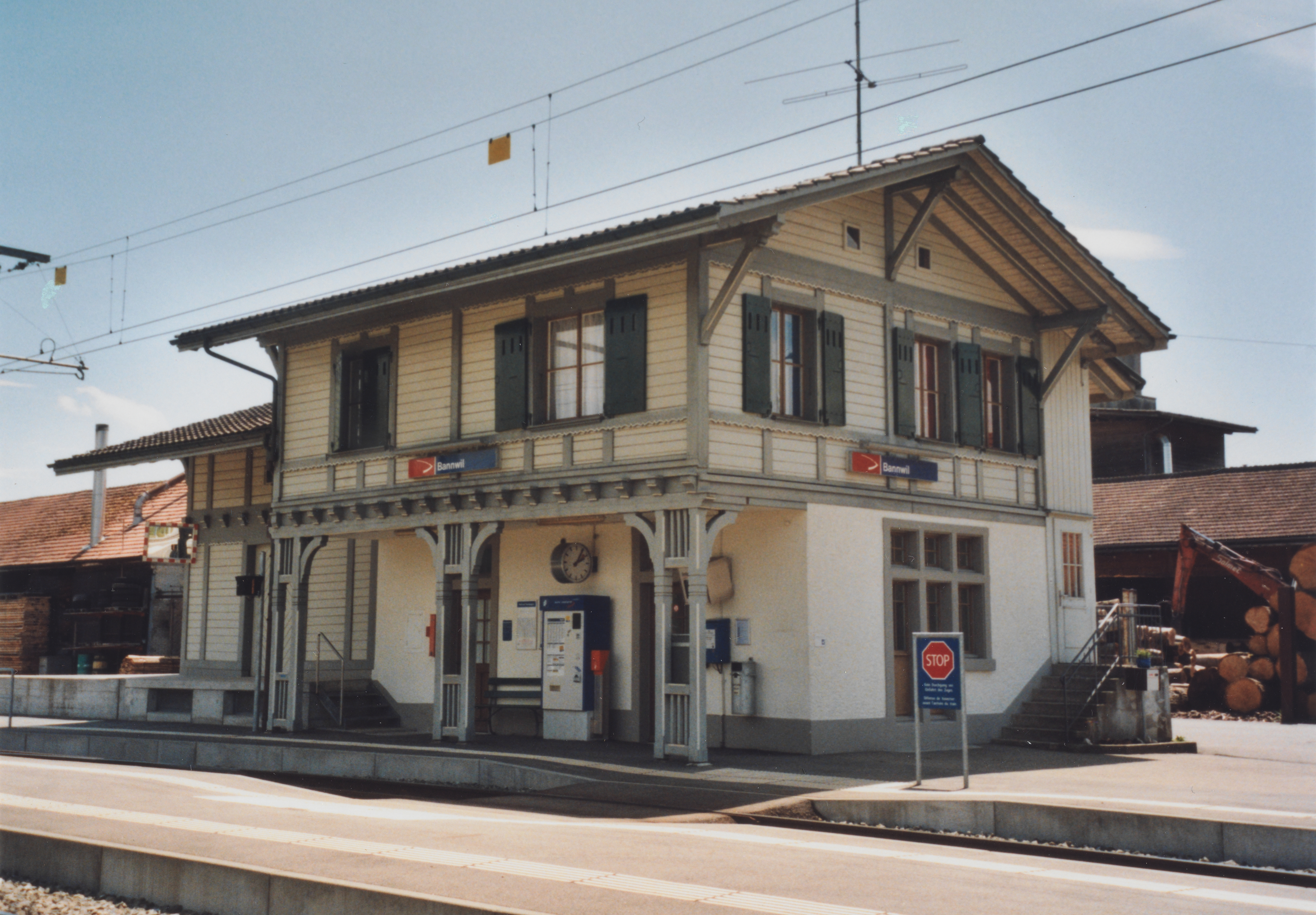
- The station in 2010

General information
- Location: Bahnweg 2, Bannwil; Bannwil; Switzerland
- Coordinates: 47°14′38″N 7°44′24″E
- Elevation: 452 m (1,483 ft)
- Owner: Aare Seeland mobil
- Line: Langenthal-Oensingen
- Train operators: Aare Seeland mobil
Location
- Location within Switzerland Location within Canton of Bern

Bannwil railway station (Bahnhof Bannwil) is a railway station on the metre-gauge line Langenthal–Oensingen at Bannwil, canton of Bern, Switzerland. It was opened in 1907 by the Langenthal-Jura-Bahn. The line is currently operated by Aare Seeland mobil (ASM). The original station building with its goods shed is in the architectural inventory of the canton of Bern.

== Gallery ==
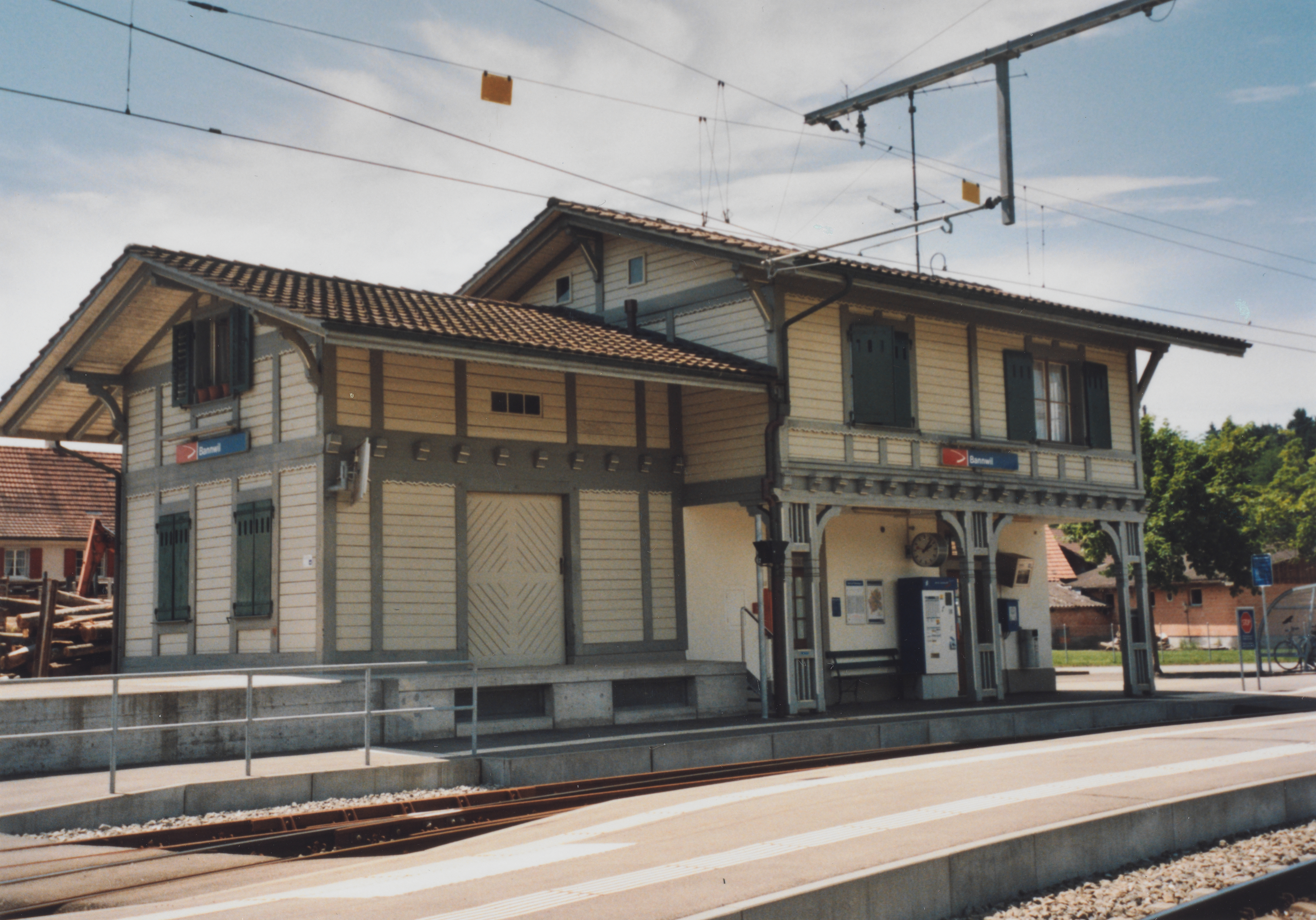
station building (2010)

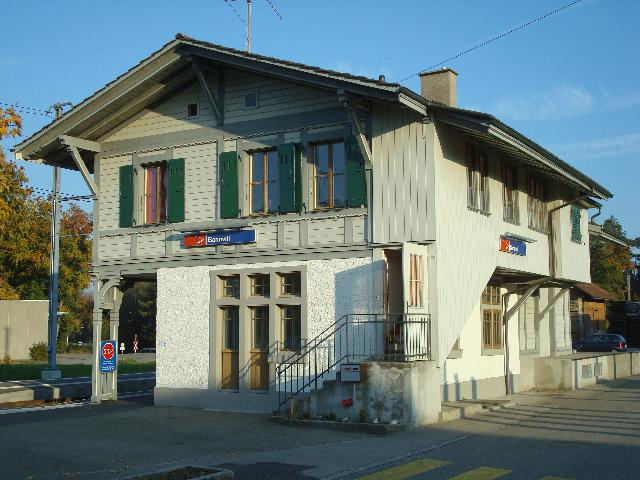
station building, street side (2008)

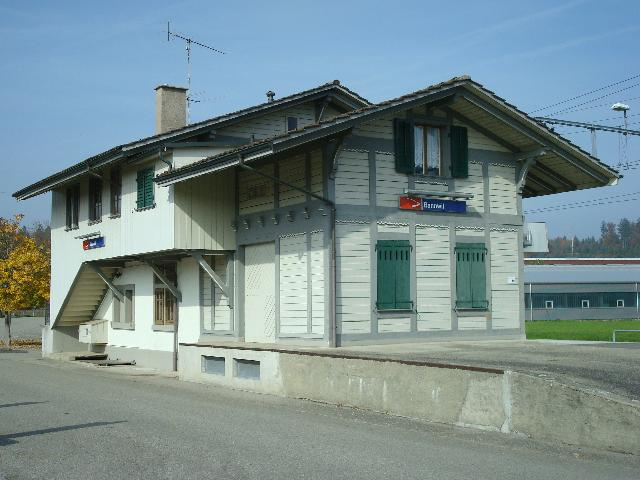
station building, street side (2008)

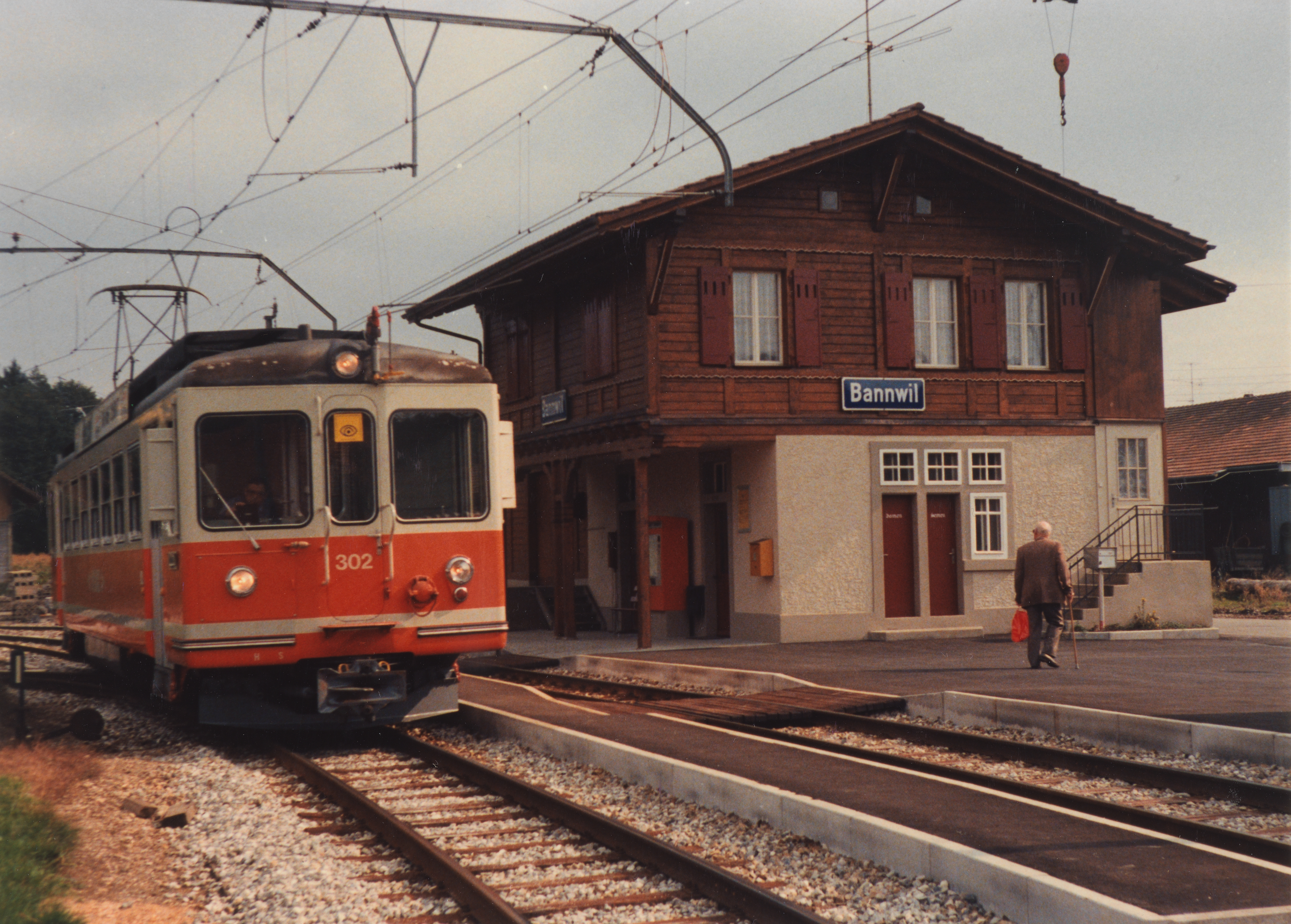
station building with upper floor in different color (undated)
