= LTB =

LTB may refer to:

- Landlord and Tenant Board, an Ontario tribunal for settling disputes between landlords and residential tenants
- Latent tuberculosis, medical condition
- Lateral-torsional buckling, mode of mechanical deformation
- Leader Training Brigade, part of the US Army's basic training organization
- Ligerz-Tessenberg-Bahn, a funicular in Switzerland
- London Tourist Board, responsible for promotion of tourism in London
- London Trained Bands, organized militia in London from 1559 to 1794
- London Transport Board, responsible for public transport in London from 1963 to 1969
- LTB dusts, solution to Einstein's field equations
- Lymphotoxin beta, human protein
- IATA code for Latrobe Airport, Tasmania, Australia. (Not to be confused with Latrobe Regional Airport (IATA: TGN) in Victoria, Australia.)
