= Oberaargau-Jura Railways =

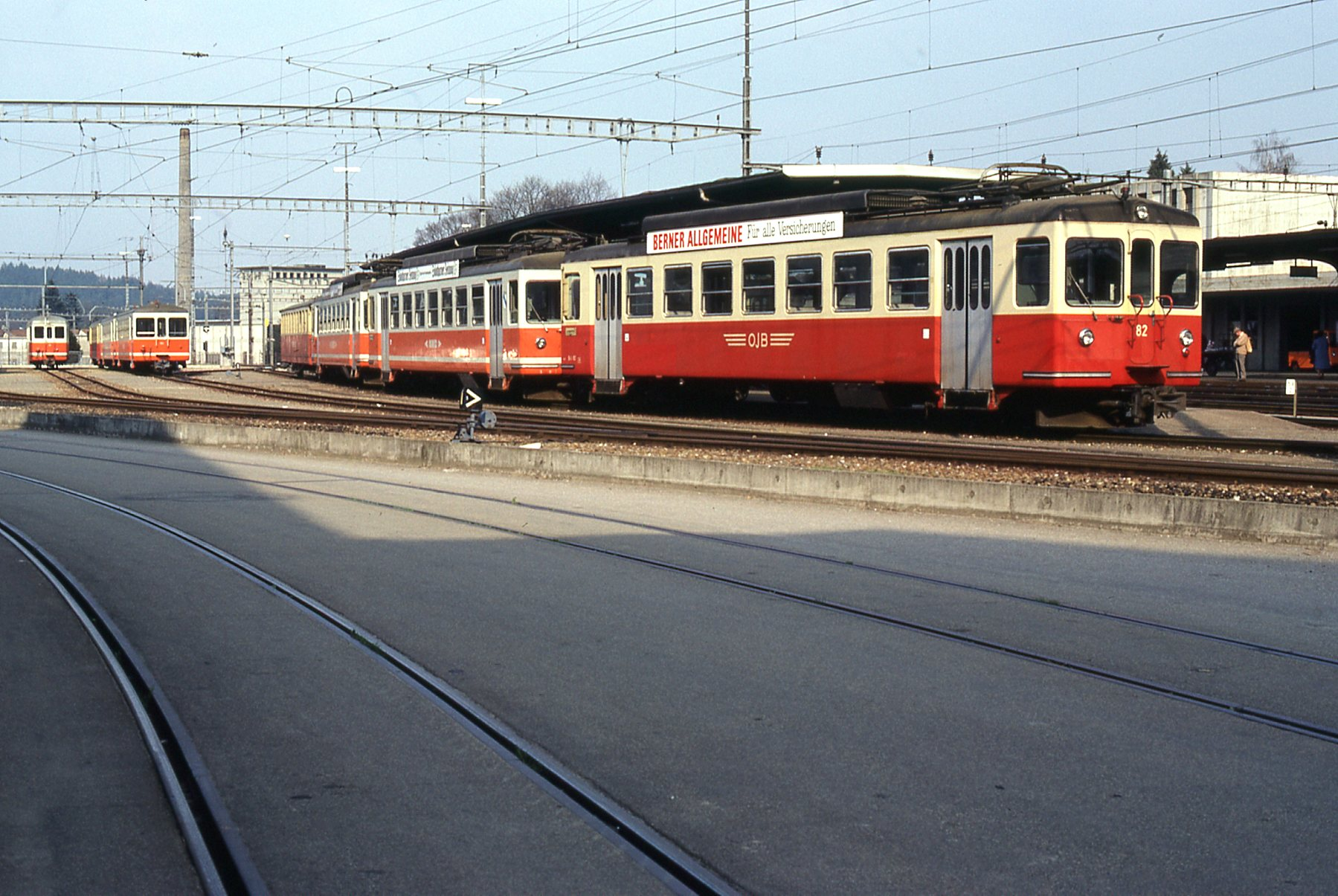
- Railcars at Langenthal in 1982

Overview
- Dates of operation: 1907–1990
- Predecessors: Langenthal-Jura Railway; Langenthal–Melchnau-Bahn
- Successor: Regionalverkehr Oberaargau

Regionalverkehr Oberaargau
Overview
- Dates of operation: 1990–1999
- Predecessor: Oberaargau-Jura Railways
- Successor: Aare Seeland mobil

The Oberaargau-Jura Railways (German: Oberaargau-Jura-Bahnen, OJB) was a former railway company in Switzerland. It was created in 1958 from the merger of the Langenthal-Jura Railway (Langenthal-Jura-Bahn; LJB) with the Langenthal–Melchnau-Bahn (lit. 'Langenthal-Melchnau Railway'; LMB). The name refers to the Oberaargau (Upper Aargau) and the Swiss Jura. The OJB changed its name to Regionalverkehr Oberaargau ("Oberaargau Regional Transport"; RVO) on 2 July 1990.

In 1999, it merged with the Biel–Täuffelen–Ins railway (Biel-Täuffelen-Ins-Bahn; BTI), the Solothurn-Niederbipp Railway (Solothurn-Niederbipp-Bahn; SNB) and the Oberaargauische Automobilkurse (OAK) to form Aare Seeland mobil (ASm), which now operates the 22 km-long, metre-gauge line from Langenthal to Niederbipp and Melchnau respectively.

== History ==
The Oberaargau-Jura-Bahnen (OJB) (Melchnau-Langenthal-Niederbipp) based in Langenthal was formed in 1958 from the merger of the Langenthal-Jura-Bahn (LJB) and the Langenthal-Melchnau-Bahn (LMB). As a result, the OJB is the direct legal successor of the LJB, which was opened in 1907 and, after the opening of the LMB in 1917, was also responsible for its operational management.

The metre-gauge lines of the predecessor companies became part of the company's assets, including the almost 11 km-long Langenthal–Aarwangen–Niederbipp line of the LJB and the more than 11 km-long Gaswerk–St. Urban–Melchnau line of the LMB. The two railways, most of which are located in the canton of Bern have been electrified at 1200 Volt DC since their opening.

As a result of the merger, cooperation with the SNB was renewed in 1959 under a new operating contract. The workshop built in Langenthal by LJB also became a workshop for the SNB rolling stock. The two companies also made their new rolling stock purchases together.

Due to the sparse settlement along the LMB line, which primarily served businesses established along the line, and the long route to Melchnau as a result of the long eastward sweeping curve it followed, passenger traffic on the St. Urban–Melchnau section was abandoned on 22 May 1982. The section remained open for goods traffic. Passenger services to Melchnau were replaced by buses, which allowed a significant reduction of travel time as they used a more direct route to Langenthal.

An early sign of the later merger was a formal agreement that was contracted on 5 April 1984 between the BTI, the OJB, the SNB, the Oberaargauischen Automobilkurse (a bus company; OAK), the Ligerz-Tessenberg-Bahn (a funicular railway; LTB) and the Bielersee-Schiffahrts-Gesellschaft (Lake Biel Ferry Company; BSG) to form Oberaargau-Solothurn-Seeland-Transport (OSST).

Construction activity in St. Urban led to a small increase in passenger numbers, which allowed the section of the LMB line between St. Urban and St. Urban Ziegelei to be reactivated for passenger traffic on 28 May 1989.

The OSST partners, BTI, RVO, SNB and OAK, were merged into Aare Seeland mobil (ASm) in 1999. The LTB was also merged into the ASm in 2003, while the BSG continues to be legally independent.

== Transporter wagon yard ==
The LJB opened the first transporter wagon yard for the transport of standard-gauge freight wagons on a metre-gauge line in Switzerland in Langenthal on 29 December 1909. The delivery points, which initially ended at Aarwangen, were extended to Bannwil on 7 March 1913. The LMB carried transporter wagons to Melchnau from its opening in 1917. The SNB, which was opened on 9 January 1918, included another transporter wagon yard, located in Niederbipp, which was also used by the LJB. It served delivery points as far as Bannwil from Niederbipp. The whole LJB line has been served from Niederbipp since 1943.

A dual gauge track was laid in the shared facility in Niederbipp, which was commissioned on 7 March 1970 and runs along the SNB to the Oberbipp siding to a tank farm.

== Railway line after the 1999 merger ==
The ASm route has been extended from Niederbipp to Oensingen, with the line running largely parallel to the existing SBB route. It was opened at the timetable change in December 2012. A tramway existed on this route under the LJB from 1907 to 1943 and it was occasionally used by the SNB.

== Rolling stock ==
Railcars

- Be 4/4 101–102 (1966–1978), ex 81–82, 102 2010, sold to BLM, commissioned in March 2011
- Be 4/4 107 (ca. 1950, rebuilt in 1973) demolished in August 2008
- Be 4/4 108 (1913) demolished in March 2007
- Be 4/4 109 (1963) ex 80, ex BA, 1990 on loan, sold to BTI in 1997, to Ferrovia Mesolcinese in 2002
- Be 4/8 110–112 (2008) and 113–115 (2011)
- Bre 4/4 116 (ex 1) (1907), nostalgia coach, also used as a special coach with restoration

Service railcars and locomotives

- Xe 2/2 90, ex 93, formerly Sernftal tramway (SeTB) Xe 2/2 22, ex Fe 2/2 22, since scrapped
- Ge 4/4 126, ex 56, (1917)
- Xe 4/4 131 was a freight railcar of the Elektrische Strassenbahnen im Kanton Zug where it was rebuilt as a passenger railcar with the designation CFe 4/4. With the end of tram operations in Zug. it was sold to the Oberaargau-Jura Railway. In 1993, it was returned to the canton of Zug and was restored in the colours of the ESZ; it is now in the Zuger Depot of Technical History.

Control car

- Bt 151, ex 101

Between 1966 and 1978, the SNB and the OJB jointly procured a total of six four-axle railcars (81–86) and five matching four-axle control cars (101–105). Under the OSST, a uniform numbering scheme was introduced for all the railway companies involved; the OJB vehicles were given 100 numbers, while the (identical) SNB vehicles were given 300 numbers.

Orange painted coaches, occasionally referred to as Schüttelbecher (shaker cups), are still in use.

=== Renewal ===
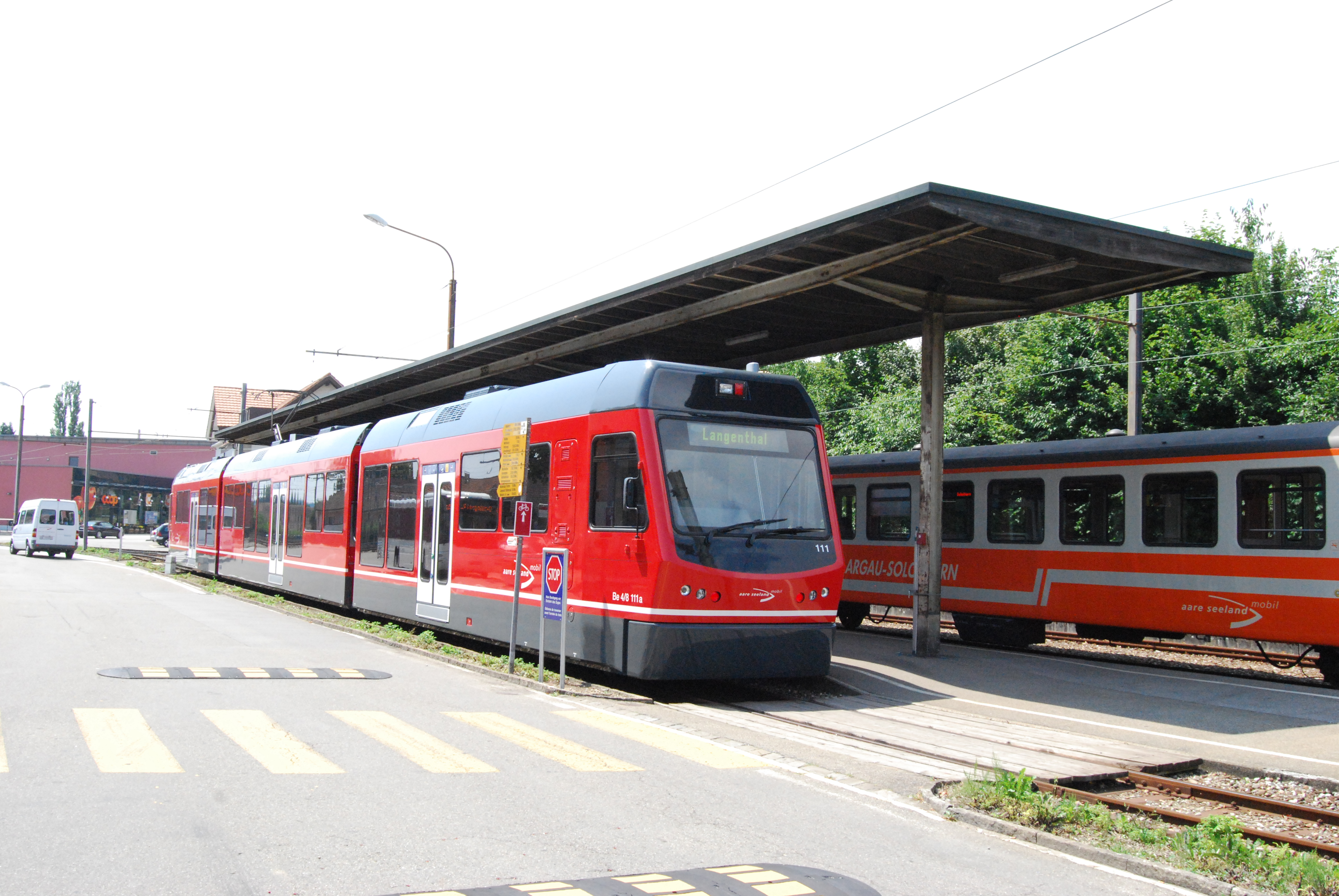
Be 4/8 "Star" railcar

With the decision to modernise the former SNB line, the rolling stock has been renewed. The ASm called tenders for three new low-floor multiple units for the whole Solothurn–Niederbipp–Langenthal line in April 2005. The tender was awarded to Stadler Rail in accordance with the metre-gauge FLIRT concept. The EMU has a similar modular structure as the new metre-gauge sets built for the Forch Railway and the St. Gallen–Trogen railway. The new program was called Star (for: Schmalspur-Triebzug für attraktiven Regionalverkehr—"narrow-gauge multiple unit for attractive regional transport"). The three trains ordered since the summer of 2008—painted dark red—are in use by the ASm. With three more trains, which were delivered in 2011, the old Solothurn-Niederbipp fleet was completely replaced.
