= Langenthal–Oensingen railway line =

Railway line in Switzerland

Langenthal–Oensingen

Overview
- Owner: Aare Seeland mobil
- Line number: 413
- Termini: Langenthal; Oensingen
- Stations: 13

History
- Opened: 26 October 1907

Technical
- Line length: 12.8 km (8.0 mi)
- Track gauge: 1,000 mm (3 ft 3 3/8 in) metre gauge
- Electrification: 1200 V DC overhead catenary

The Langenthal–Oensingen railway line is a 1,000 mm (3 ft 3 3/8 in) railway line in the cantons of Bern and Solothurn, in Switzerland. It runs 11.0 kilometres (6.8 mi) from Langenthal to Niederbipp, where it connects with the Solothurn–Niederbipp line, and then 1.8 kilometres (1.1 mi) to Oensingen. Aare Seeland mobil owns and operates the line.

== History ==
The Langenthal-Jura Railway (German: Langenthal-Jura-Bahn) opened a line between Langenthal and Oensingen Schulhaus, east of the present terminus at Oensingen, on 26 October 1907. The line was electrified from opening at 1000 V DC, later rebuilt to 1200 V DC. The company abandoned the section between Oensingen and Oensingen Schulhaus on 14 May 1928. The line was further cut back from Oensingen to Niederbipp on 9 May 1943.

The Langenthal-Jura Railway merged with the Langenthal–Melchnau-Bahn (lit. 'Langenthal–Melchnau Railway') in 1958 to form the Oberaargau-Jura Railways (German: Oberaargau–Jura-Bahnen) in 1958. The company was renamed Regionalverkehr Oberaargau in 1990. Regionalverkehr Oberaargau and two other companies merged in 1999 to form Aare Seeland mobil, who continues to own and operate the line.

Between 2010 and 2012, Aare Seeland mobil built a 1.8-kilometre (1.1 mi) extension between Niederbipp and Oensingen, using a different alignment from the original routing. This extension opened for service in October 2012.

== Route ==
The line begins at Langenthal, where Aare Seeland mobil (ASm) has an island platform on the north side of the station. The Langenthal–Melchnau railway line diverges north of the Langenthal Gaswerk and the Mattstetten–Rothrist new line passes underneath in a tunnel. West of Niederbipp, the line passes under the Jura Foot Line and joins the Solothurn–Niederbipp railway line, which runs west to Solothurn. From Niederbipp, the 2012 extension follows the right-of-way of the Jura Foot Line to Oensingen. At Oensingen, ASm has an island platform at the north side of the station.

== Operation ==
As of the December 2021 timetable change, Aare Seeland mobil operates half-hourly service over the line. Trains originate in Solothurn, run via Niederbipp to Oensingen, then backtrack via Niederbipp to Langenthal.
