= Solothurn–Niederbipp railway line =

Railway line in Switzerland

Solothurn–Niederbipp

Overview
- Owner: Aare Seeland mobil
- Line number: 413
- Termini: Solothurn; Niederbipp
- Stations: 13

Technical
- Line length: 14.54 km (9.03 mi)
- Number of tracks: 1
- Track gauge: 1,000 mm (3 ft 3 3/8 in) metre gauge
- Electrification: Overhead line, 1,200 V DC
- Maximum incline: 3.6%

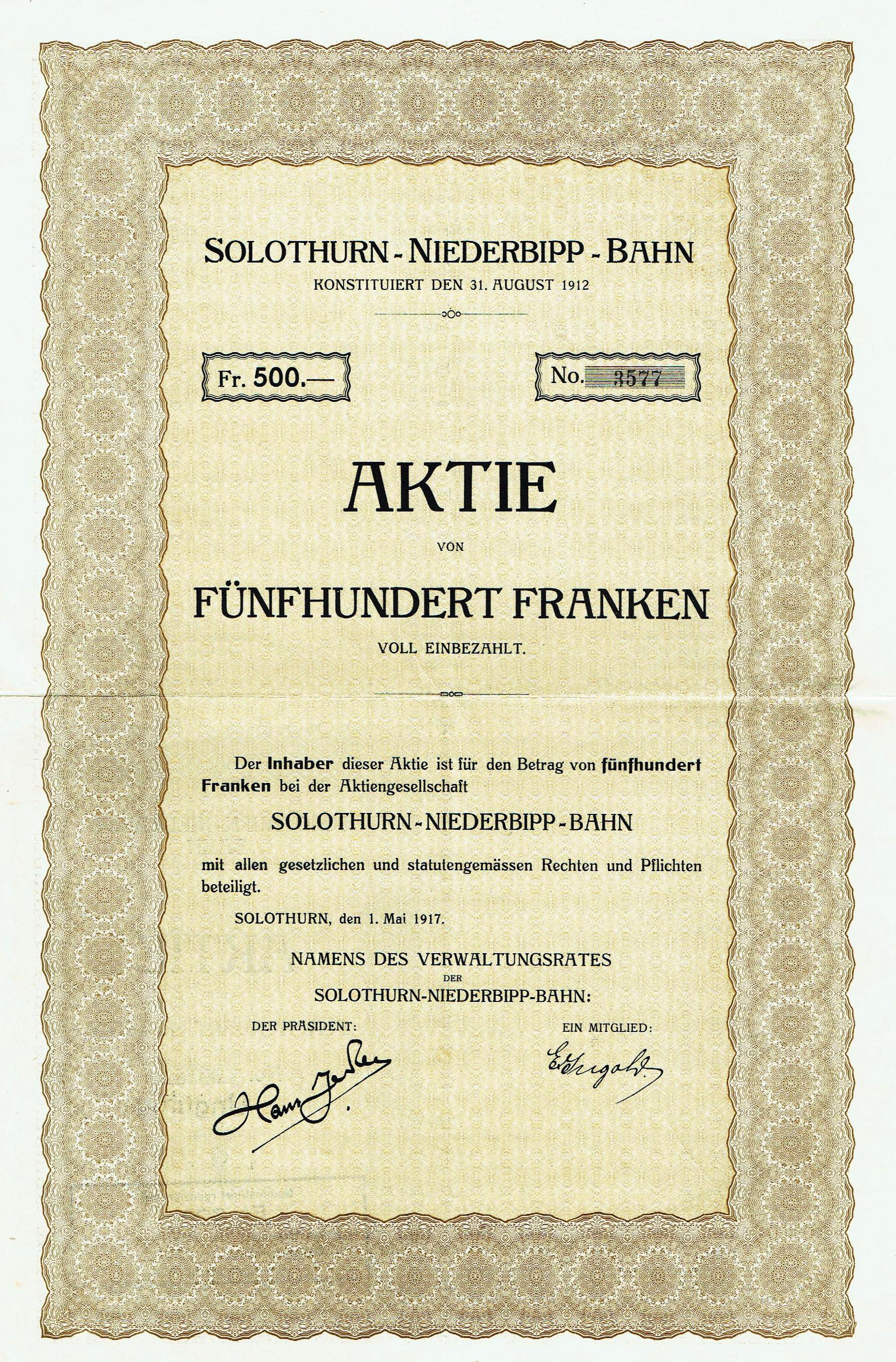
Share in the Solothurn-Niederbipp Railway with a nominal value of over 500 Swiss francs issued on 1 May 1917

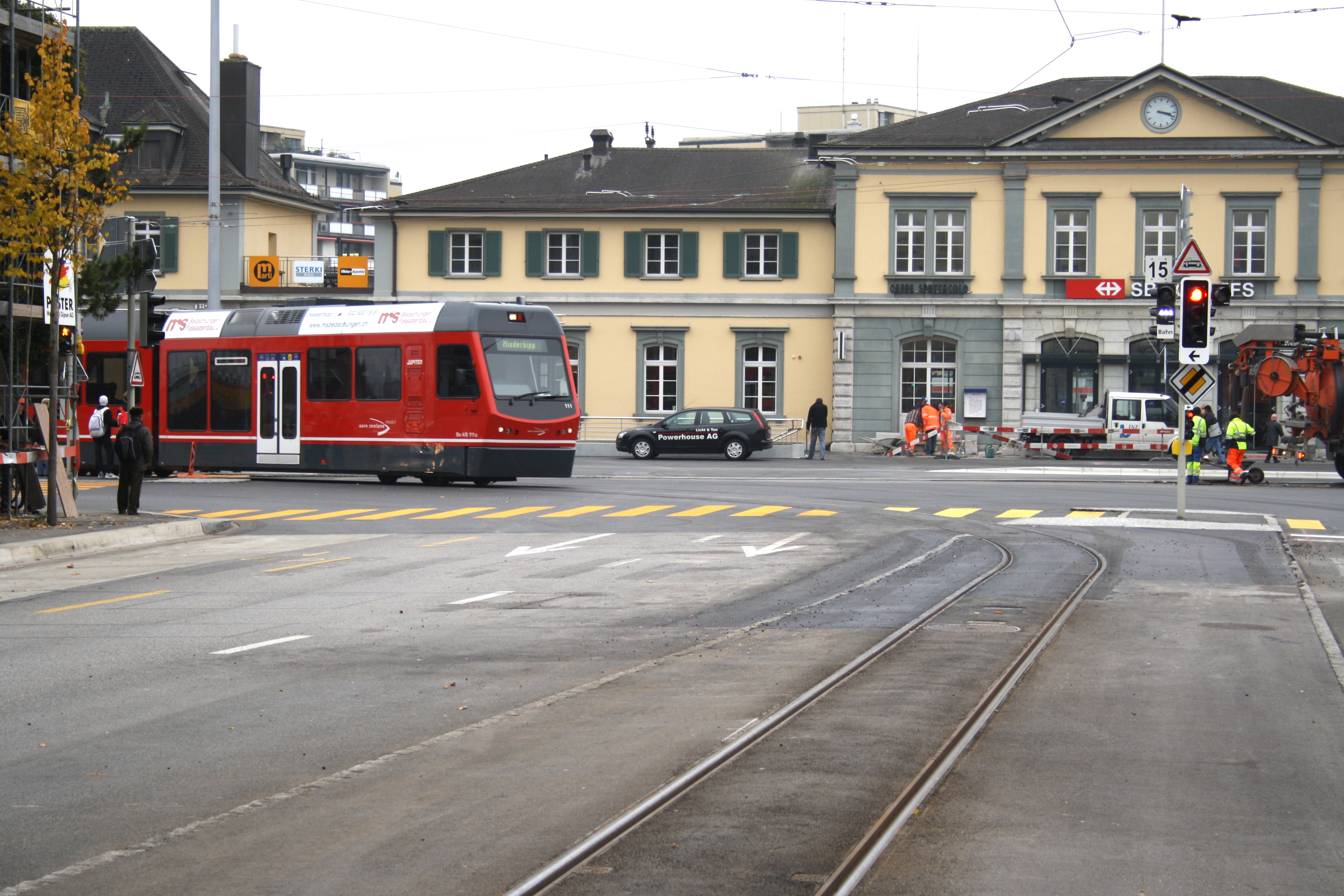
Be 4/8 111 set at Solothurn station

The Solothurn–Niederbipp railway line is a 1,000 mm (3 ft 3 3/8 in) railway line in the cantons Bern and Solothurn, Switzerland. It runs 14.5 kilometres (9.0 mi) from Solothurn to Niederbipp. The line was built in 1918 by the Solothurn-Niederbipp-Bahn and is now owned and operated by Aare Seeland mobil (asm).

The railway is locally called the Bipperlisi. This term has long outgrown the vernacular and finds itself used in the official communications of the canton of Solothurn.

== History ==
=== Start of operations ===
The Solothurn-Niederbipp-Bahn, which was based in Solothurn, opened its metre-gauge line from Niederbipp in the canton of Bern to Baseltor station in the capital of the canton of Solothurn on 9 January 1918. There was a connection in Niederbipp to the also metre-gauge Langenthal-Jura Railway (Langenthal-Jura-Bahn; LJB), which had opened on the Langenthal–Niederbipp–Oensingen Schulhaus route in 1907. It soon sought cooperation with the LJB and the Langenthal–Melchnau-Bahn (lit. 'Langenthal-Melchnau Railway'; LMB), which had opened in 1917. It used the 1200 Volt DC electrification system, already used by the LJB.

The SNB line ended north of the Aare in Solothurn at the Baseltor (Basel Gate) on the edge of the old town, while the station of the Swiss Federal Railways (SBB) is south of the Aare. The commercially-important proximity to the SBB station was achieved with the construction of the Röti bridge over the Aare and the opening of the tramway-like Solothurn Baseltor–Solothurn (SBB) section running over it on 7 September 1925. Since then, the terminus of the SNB has been located in the station forecourt (Bahnhofplatz) on the north side of the SBB station.

The SNB was hardly affected by significant changes in the following years, while changes at the neighbouring LJB and LMB railways only marginally affected it. After 1928, the LJB had closed a section in Oensingen, followed by the entire Niederbipp–Oensingen section on 9 May 1943. This made Niederbipp a terminal station for the metre-gauge railways.

=== Mergers ===
On 1 January 1958, the LJB and the Langenthal–Melchnau-Bahn merged with the Oberaargau-Jura Railways (Oberaargau-Jura-Bahnen; OJB), with which the SNB concluded a new cooperation agreement in 1959. As a result of the cooperation, the SNB was able to do without its own workshop; rolling stock maintenance has since been carried out by the OJB workshop in Langenthal.

In order to transport standard-gauge freight wagons of the SBB on the metre-gauge line, a transporter wagon yard was opened in Niederbipp, allowing the delivery points as far as Riedholz to be served. The yard was also shared by the LJB, which had used the same system in Langenthal since 1909. This extremely complex system for the transport of large volumes was largely replaced on the SNB by the commissioning of a dual gauge section between Niederbipp and the Oberbipp (tank farm) siding on 7 March 1970.

An early sign of the later merger was a formal agreement that was contracted on 5 April 1984 between the BTI, the OJB, the SNB, the Oberaargauischen Automobilkurse (a bus company; OAK), the Ligerz-Tessenberg-Bahn (a funicular railway; LTB) and the Bielersee-Schiffahrts-Gesellschaft (Lake Biel Ferry Company; BSG) to form Oberaargau-Solothurn-Seeland-Transport (OSST).

Before the merger, the OJB changed its name to Regionalverkehr Oberaargau ("Oberaargau Regional Transport"; RVO) on 2 July 1990. The OSST partners BTI, RVO, SNB and OAK finally completed the merger into Aare Seeland mobil (ASm) in 1999. The LTB was also merged into the ASm in 2003, while the BSG has remained legally independent until today.

== Line after the 1999 merger ==
The current ASm line has now been extended from Niederbipp to Oensingen again. The groundbreaking ceremony was held on 1 December 2010, while operations on the new 1.7 kilometre-long section commenced at the timetable change on 9 December 2012. This line generally uses the route used by the LJB from 1907 to 1943—but built as a tramway—and which was occasionally shared by the SNB even then.

== Rolling stock ==
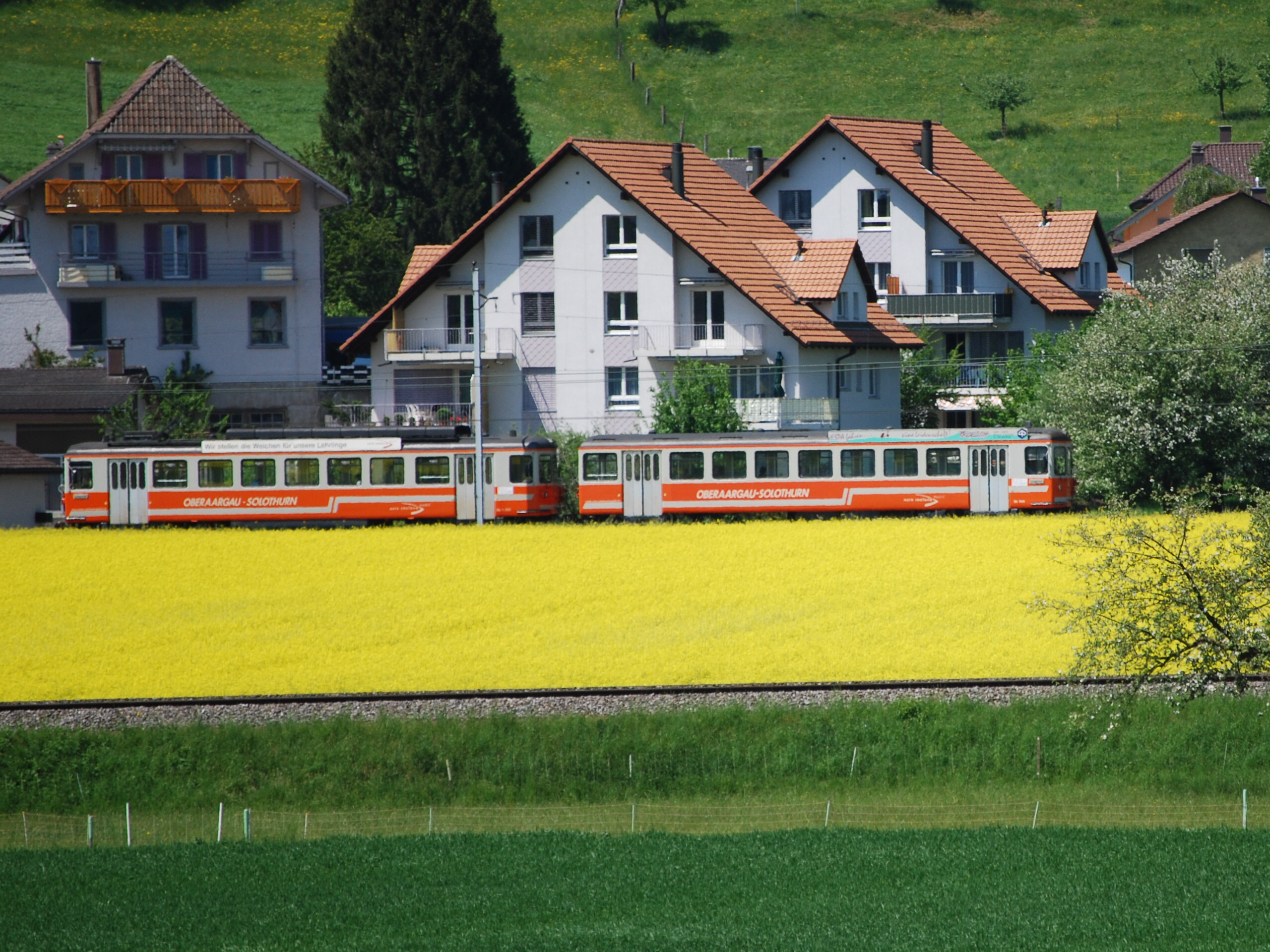
Solothurn-Niederbipp Railway service in Buchli Niederbipp

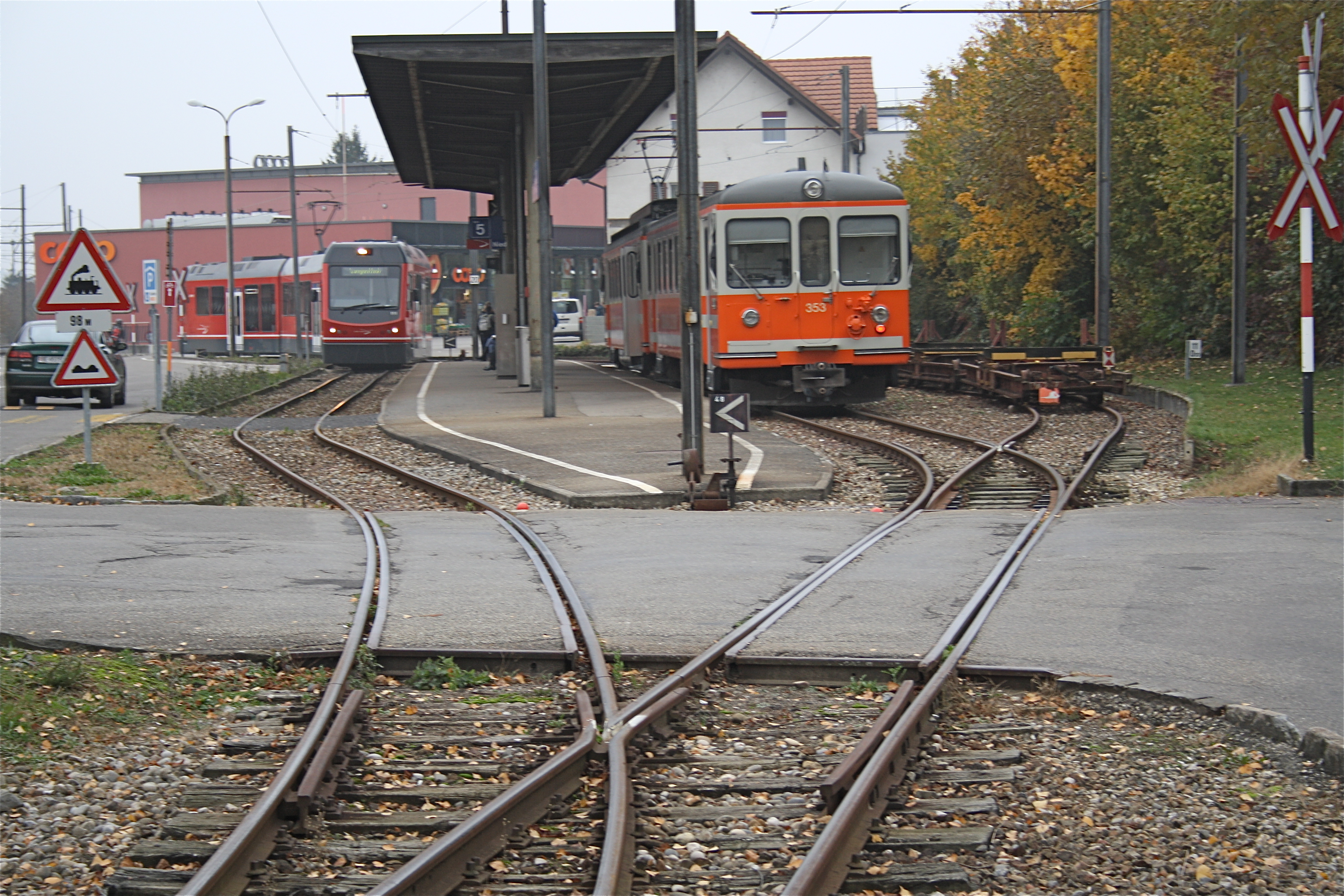
Incoming Be 4/8 111 set and Bt 353 control car in Niederbipp

Railcars

- Be 4/4 301–304 (1966–1978), ex 83–86
- Be 4/8 110–112 (2008) and 113–115 (2011)
- Be 4/4 14 and Bt, ex FWB

Control car

- Bt 351–354, ex 102–105

Between 1966 and 1978, the SNB and the OJB jointly procured a total of six four-axle railcars (81–86) and five matching four-axle control cars (101–105). Under the OSST, a uniform numbering scheme was introduced for all railway companies involved, the SNB vehicles were given 300 numbers while the (identical) OJB vehicles were given 100 numbers. The orange-coloured vehicles, sometimes referred to as Schüttelbecher ("shaker cups"), were stored, sold or scrapped.

Renovation

With the decision to modernise the former SNB line, the rolling stock has been renewed. The ASm called tenders for three new low-floor multiple units for the whole Solothurn–Niederbipp–Langenthal line in April 2005. The tender was awarded to Stadler Rail in accordance with the metre-gauge FLIRT concept. The EMU has a similar modular structure as the new metre-gauge sets built for the Forch Railway and the St. Gallen–Trogen railway. The new program was called Star (for: Schmalspur-Triebzug für attraktiven Regionalverkehr—"narrow-gauge multiple unit for attractive regional transport"). The three trains ordered since the summer of 2008—painted dark red—are in use by the ASm. With three more trains, which were delivered in 2011, the old Solothurn-Niederbipp fleet was completely replaced.
