= Langenthal–Melchnau railway line =

Railway line in Switzerland

Langenthal–Melchnau
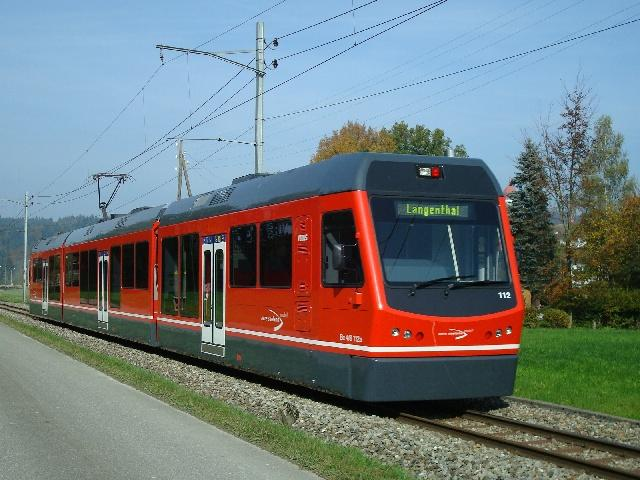
- Stadler STAR articulated train Be 4/8 112 ("Venus") between St. Urban and St. Urban Ziegelei

Overview
- Owner: Aare Seeland mobil
- Line number: 414
- Termini: Langenthal; St. Urban Ziegelei

Technical
- Line length: 12.14 km (7.54 mi)
- Number of tracks: 1
- Track gauge: 1,000 mm (3 ft 3 3/8 in) metre gauge
- Electrification: 1200 V DC overhead catenary
- Maximum incline: 4.5%

The Langenthal–Melchnau railway line is a metre-gauge line between Langenthal and St. Urban in Switzerland; it originally ran to Melchnau. It was built by the former Langenthal–Melchnau-Bahn (lit. 'Langenthal–Melchnau Railway'; LMB). The line runs through the cantons of Bern and Lucerne and is now owned and operated by Aare Seeland mobil.

== History ==
The construction work began on 6 December 1915, not from Langenthal, but from Langenthal Gaswerk junctions on the Langenthal–Oensingen railway line of the Langenthal-Jura Railway (German: Langenthal-Jura-Bahn, LJB). This had opened on 26 October 1912. This short section was used by trains of both the Langenthal–Melchnau Railway and the Langenthal-Jura Railway. All of the Langenthal–St. Urban–Melchnau railway was opened on 6 October 1917 and it was operated electrically from the beginning.

Since the line and the rolling stock of the Langenthal–Melchnau Railway were built to the same standards as the Langenthal-Jura Railway, the rolling stock could be freely operated over both lines. Transporter wagons were used for freight transport from the beginning. These allowed the transport of goods without time-consuming reloading on to standard gauge wagons.

The Langenthal-Jura Railway and Langenthal–Melchnau Railway merged in 1958 to form the Oberaargau-Jura Railway (German: Oberaargau-Jura-Bahnen; OJB). In 1990, the company was renamed Regionalverkehr Oberaargau ("Oberaargau Regional Transport"; RVO). This was in turn merged with the Biel–Täuffelen–Ins railway (Biel-Täuffelen-Ins-Bahn; BTI), the Solothurn-Niederbipp Railway (Solothurn-Niederbipp-Bahn; SNB) and the Oberaargauische Automobilkurse (OAK) to form Aare Seeland mobil (ASm) in 1999. Since then, Aare Seeland has been the owner and operator of the line. Passenger services operate between Langenthal and St. Urban Ziegelei every half hour.

=== Partial conversion to bus operation ===
Under the former Oberaargau-Jura Railway, passenger traffic between St. Urban, in the canton of Lucerne, and Melchnau, in the canton of Bern, was transferred to bus on 22 May 1982. A new bus route now ran from Roggwil to Melchnau via St. Urban and Untersteckholz and another new bus route ran from Langenthal to Melchnau directly via Obersteckholz, avoiding the time-consuming detour via Roggwil and St. Urban.

However, the bus route from Roggwil via St. Urban and Untersteckholz to Melchnau ran for only a short time. As a result, Untersteckholz lost its access to public transport. The short section from St. Urban to St. Urban Ziegelei was reopened for passenger traffic on 28 May 1989.

=== Closure of the St. Urban–Melchnau section ===
The station building of Melchnau together with the coach house as well as the station building of Untersteckholz have been sold to private individuals. The only major freight customer on the St. Urban–Melchnau section before the line was finally closed in 2012 was the Melchnau branch of the Landi agricultural cooperative.

The St. Urban–Melchnau section was dismantled from 2015 to 2016. The dismantling was financed by the sale of the land the line was built on and materials resulting from the demolition. The main buyer in Melchnau was the municipality of Melchnau, which will use the acquired land for a future flood protection project.
