= Aare Seeland mobil =

Swiss transport company

Overview
- Transit type: Trains, buses and funicular
- Number of lines: 3 railway lines; 10 bus routes; 1 funicular line
- Number of stations: rail: 54; bus: 124
- Annual ridership: 6 million
- Chief executive: Fredy Miller
- Headquarters: Langenthal (canton of Bern)
- Website: asmobil.ch

Technical
- Track gauge: 1,000 mm (3 ft 3 3/8 in) metre gauge
- Electrification: Overhead line, 1,200 V DC

The Aare Seeland mobil AG (branded asm or asmobil) based in Langenthal is a transport company in Switzerland. It was created in 1999 from the merger of Oberaargau Regional Transport (Regionalverkehr Oberaargau; RVO), the Solothurn-Niederbipp Railway (Solothurn-Niederbipp-Bahn; SNB), the Biel-Täuffelen-Ins Railway (Biel-Täuffelen-Ins-Bahn; BTI) and the Oberaargauische Automobilkurse (a bus company; OAK).

== History ==
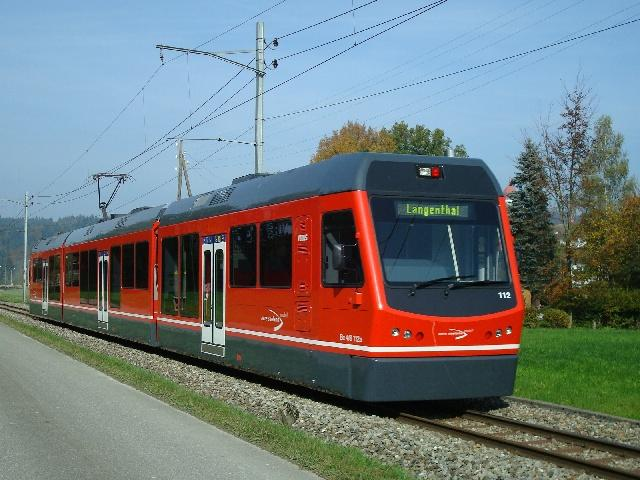
Be 4/8 112 (Venus) multiple unit near St. Urban

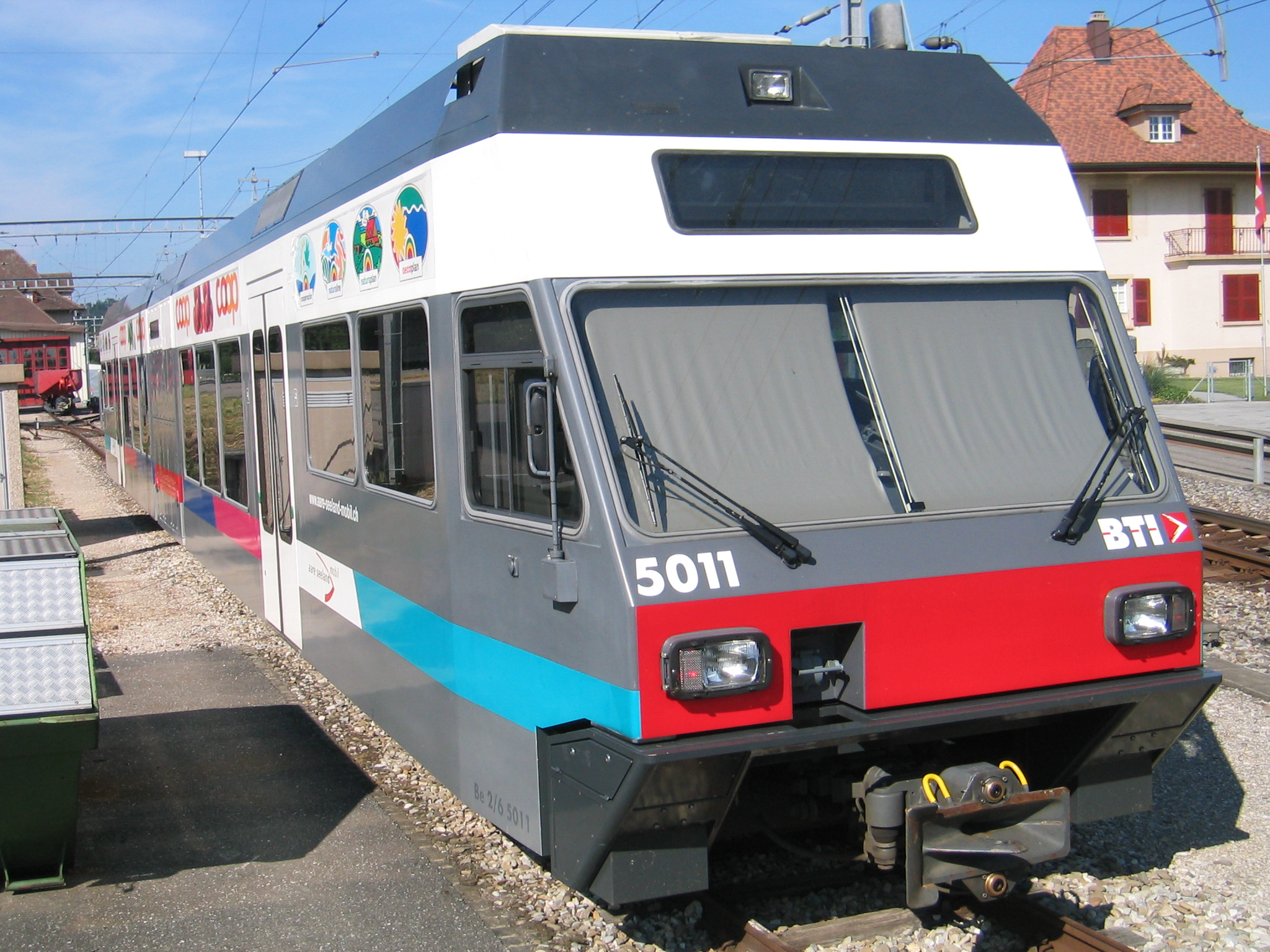
Be 2/6 5011 multiple unit in Täuffelen

Logo of the BSG

The legal merger of the transport companies in Aare Seeland mobil AG had long been preceded by company agreements between individual companies. The Langenthal-Jura Railway (Langenthal-Jura-Bahn; LJB) was opened in 1907 and it also provided the operational management of the Langenthal–Melchnau-Bahn (lit. 'Langenthal-Melchnau Railway'; LMB), which was opened in 1917. The Solothurn-Niederbipp Railway (Solothurn-Niederbipp-Bahn, SNB), which opened in 1918 also immediately agreed to cooperate with the LJB. The LJB and the LMB formally merged in 1958 to form the Oberaargau-Jura Railways (Oberaargau-Jura-Bahnen; OJB). The cooperation with the SNB increased and the isolated Biel-Täuffelen-Ins Railway (Biel-Täuffelen-Ins-Bahn; BTI) began cooperating with the two companies in 1960.

The cooperation was put on a new footing on 5 April 1984 as a contractual agreement for a joint operation under the name Oberaargau-Solothurn-Seeland-Transport (OSST) between OJB, SNB, BTI, the Oberaargauische Automobilkurse (OAK), the Ligerz-Tessenberg-Bahn (a funicular railway; LTB) and the Bielersee-Schifffahrts-Gesellschaft (Lake Biel Ferry Company; BSG). OSST, which was formed on a contractual basis, became the de facto predecessor of the company legally merged under the name Aare Seeland mobil AG (asm). Before the merger, the OJB had changed its name for the last time to Regionalverkehr Oberaargau AG (RVO) on 2 July 1990.

In 1999, RVO, SNB, BTI and OAK merged retroactively into a single public company, usually called Aare Seeland mobil (asm), with effect from 1 January 1999. OSST partner LTB was also merged into asm in 2003, with retroactive effect from 1 January 2003.

The BSG continues to be a cooperating partner in asm, while being legally independent.

== Company form ==
Legally Aare Seeland Mobil AG is called "Regionalverkehr Oberaargau AG (RVO)" (earlier "Oberaargau-Jura-Bahnen (OJB) (Melchnau-Langenthal-Niederbipp)"), the share capital of which was increased as a result of the mergers. The capital increase and the name change took effect on 28 June with entry in the commercial register and retroactive effect as of 1 January 1999. The Solothurn-Niederbipp-Bahn (SNB) in Solothurn, the Biel-Täuffelen-Ins-Bahn AG in Täuffelen and the Oberaargauische Automobilkurse AG (OAK) in Wangen an der Aare were taken over—these three joint stock companies took part in the merger and became inactive and were deleted from the respective commercial registers in January 2003.

A further capital increase became effective on 2 July 2003 with entry into the commercial register, under which the Ligerz-Tessenberg-Bahn AG (LTB) in Ligerz was retroactively taken over by asm on 1 January.

== Stations and structures ==
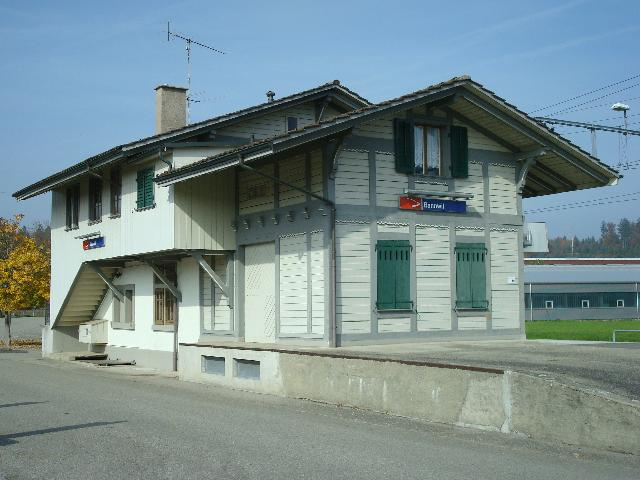
Historic Bannwil station building from 1907

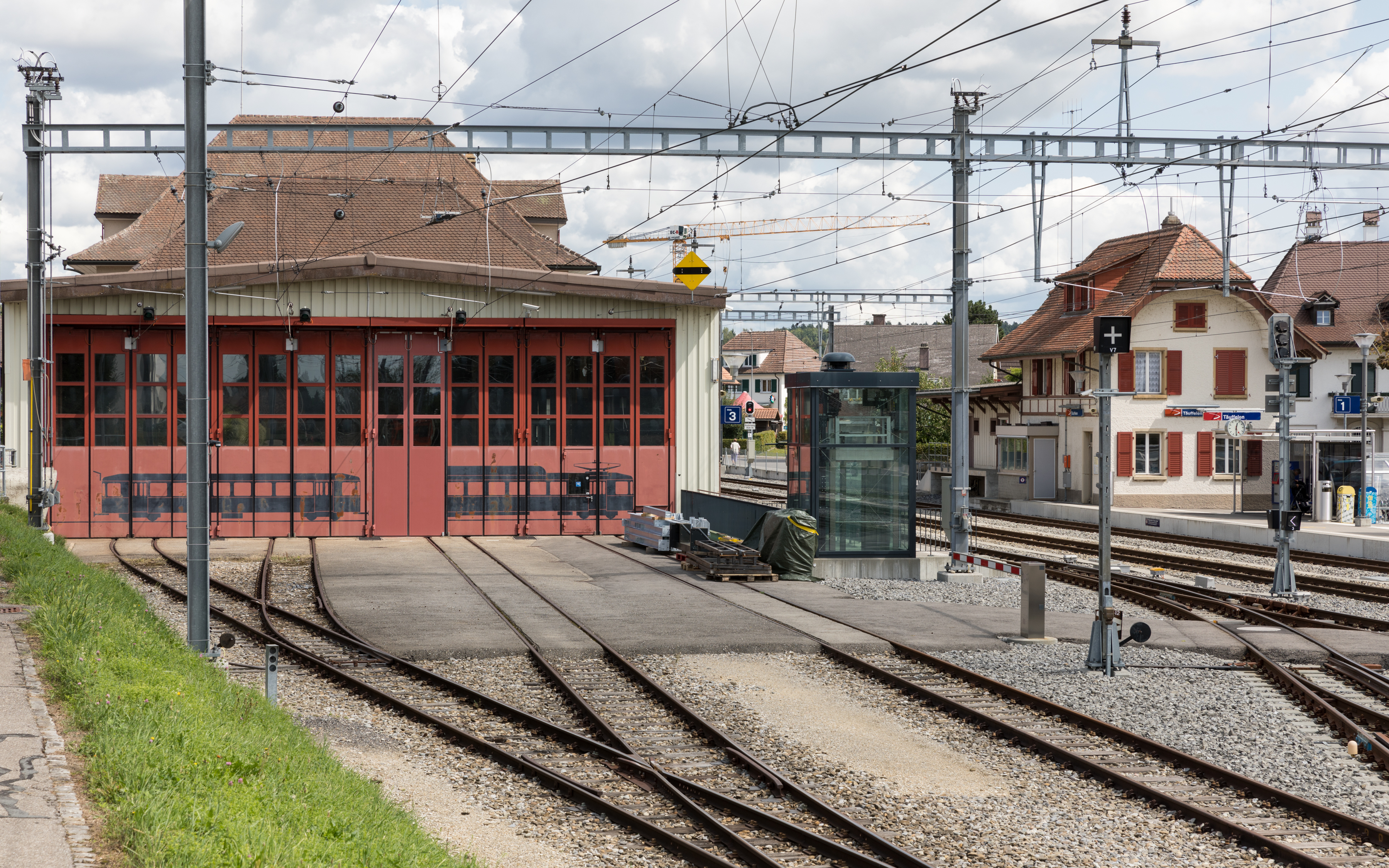
Vehicle depot/station Täuffelen

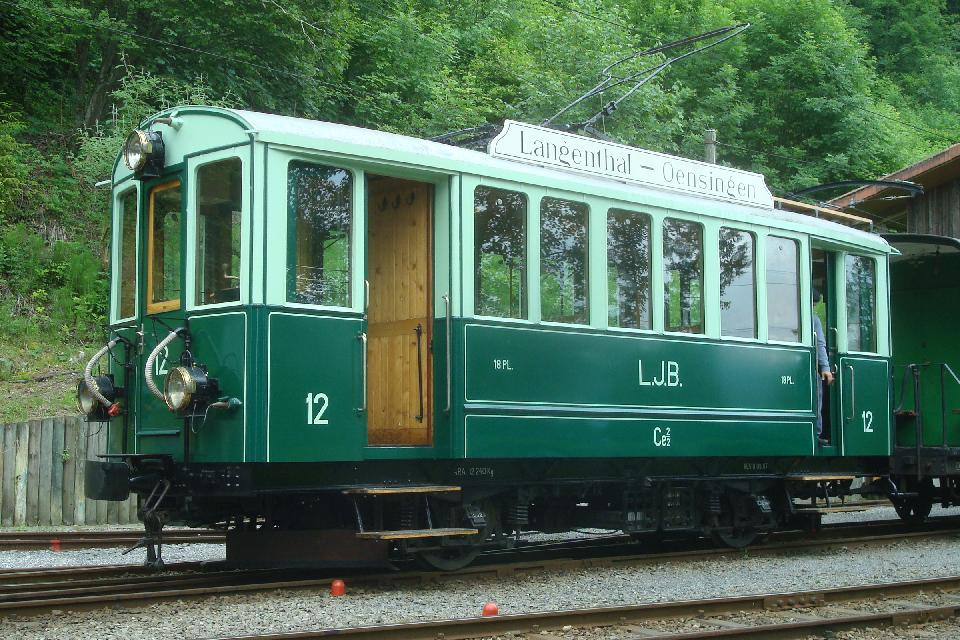
Ce 2/2 12 of the former Langenthal-Jura Railway, at the Blonay-Chamby Museum Railway in spring 2010

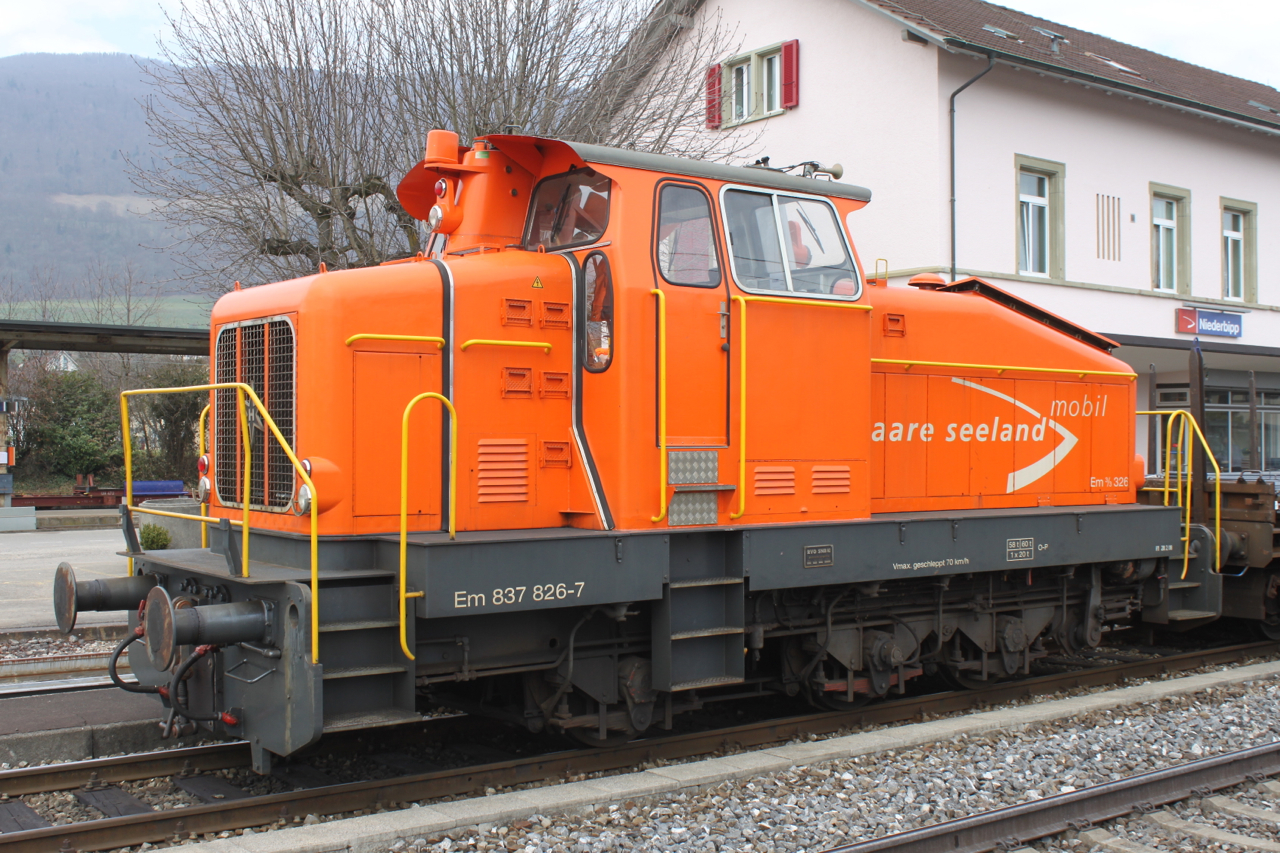
Standard gauge Em 837 826 (class Henschel DHG 500 C) in Niederbipp, 2010

In contrast to its historic rolling stock, which barely exists—a lovingly restored vehicle, the Ce 2/2 12 motor car of the former Langenthal-Jura Railway is located at the Blonay–Chamby museum railway—Aare Seeland mobil, like other similar transport companies, is notable for its historical buildings.

While some buildings that were no longer required for operation, such as Untersteckholz and Melchnau stations, have been sold to private owners, the station buildings of Aarwangen, Bannwil and the valley station of the Ligerz-Tessenberg-Bahn funicular railway as well as the original buildings of the Langenthal depot have been carefully restored.

== Operations ==
=== Rail operations ===
The oldest business division of asm derives originally from four railway companies, each with its own main line. These four lines had a total length of 57.76 km. Today there are two isolated sub-networks, each of which can be served by one service.

The lines of the former OJB—originally LJB and LMB—and the SNB have a length of 33.2 km, running from St. Urban via Langenthal, Niederbipp and Oensingen to Solothurn (Langenthal–Oensingen and Langenthal–Melchnau lines). The line is continuously electrified with 1200 volts DC and requires two changes of direction (Langenthal and Oensingen), with the Langenthal–Gaswerk (1.10 km) and Niederbipp–Oensingen (1.8 km) sections needing to be run over twice. Passenger traffic has been discontinued since 1982 on the 5.16 km-long St. Urban Ziegelei–Melchnau section. The line from Niederbipp to Oensingen was opened in 2012, although the LJB had already operated between these towns between 1907 and 1943.

The track of the former BTI (the Biel–Täuffelen–Ins railway line) is isolated and extends 21.19 km from Biel via Täuffelen and Siselen to Ins; its whole length is electrified at 1300 volt DC and it is in operation.

==== Rail routes ====
Biel - Täuffelen - Ins
Ligerz (Talstation)–Prêles (Tessenberg)
Solothurn–Oensingen–Langenthal
Langenthal–St. Urban Ziegelei

=== Bus operations ===
Asm's bus business is largely based on the OAK. It centres on routes in the Langenthal–Herzogenbuchsee–Wangen an der Aare (former headquarters of the OAK)–Niederbipp area, including routes of Stadtbus Langenthal (Langenthal municipal buses), which are operated by asm. From December 2008, a Niederbipp-Oensingen bus route was also operated that was intended as a trial for the extension of the metre-gauge railway to Oensingen. The Biel–Meinisberg bus route was taken over from Busbetrieb Grenchen und Umgebung (BGU) in December 2009. The Herzogenbuchsee–Solothurn BSU route is also partly operated with asm vehicles.

There are about 20 vehicles in service, mostly standard MAN buses, but also some midi, articulated and minibuses.

==== Bus routes ====
5	Herzogenbuchsee - Aeschi - Horriwil - Solothurn Hauptbahnhof - Solothurn Brühl
7	Herzogenbuchsee - Röthenbach - Aeschi - Horriwil - Solothurn Hauptbahnhof - Solothurn Brühl
51	(Grossdietwil -) Melchnau - Langenthal - Bützberg - Herzogenbuchsee - Röthenbach - Wangen a.d. Aare
52	Thunstetten - Langenthal - Bleienbach - Thörigen - Bettenhausen - Bollodingen - Herzogenbuchsee
54	Herzogenbuchsee - Grasswil - Riedtwil - Wynigen
58	Wangen a.d. Aare - Wiedlisbach - Rumisberg - Farnern
63	Langenthal, Bahnhof - Industrie Nord - Langenthal, Bahnhof - Tell/Kantonalbank - Spital - Tell/Kantonalbank - Langenthal, Bahnhof (Stadtbus)
64	Lotzwil, Unterdorf - Tell/Kantonalbank - Langenthal, Bahnhof - Schoren - Langenthal, Bahnhof - Tell/Kantonalbank - Lotzwil, Unterdorf (Stadtbus)
72	Biel/Bienne Bahnhof - Meinisberg
73	Pieterlen - Reuchenette/Pèry
74	Biel/Bienne - Brügg BE - Studen BE - Lyss

=== Funicular railway ===
Since 2003, Vinifuni Ligerz–Prêles, the almost 1.20 km-long metre-gauge funicular railway of the former LTB has belonged to the asm. It connects Ligerz with Prêles on the Tessenberg and overcomes a height difference of 383 metres. The original funicular railway opened in 1912 was replaced by new system due to its age and it reopened on 17 May 2004 under the name of Vinifuni.
