= Monthey–Champéry–Morgins railway =

Railway line in Chablais, Switzerland

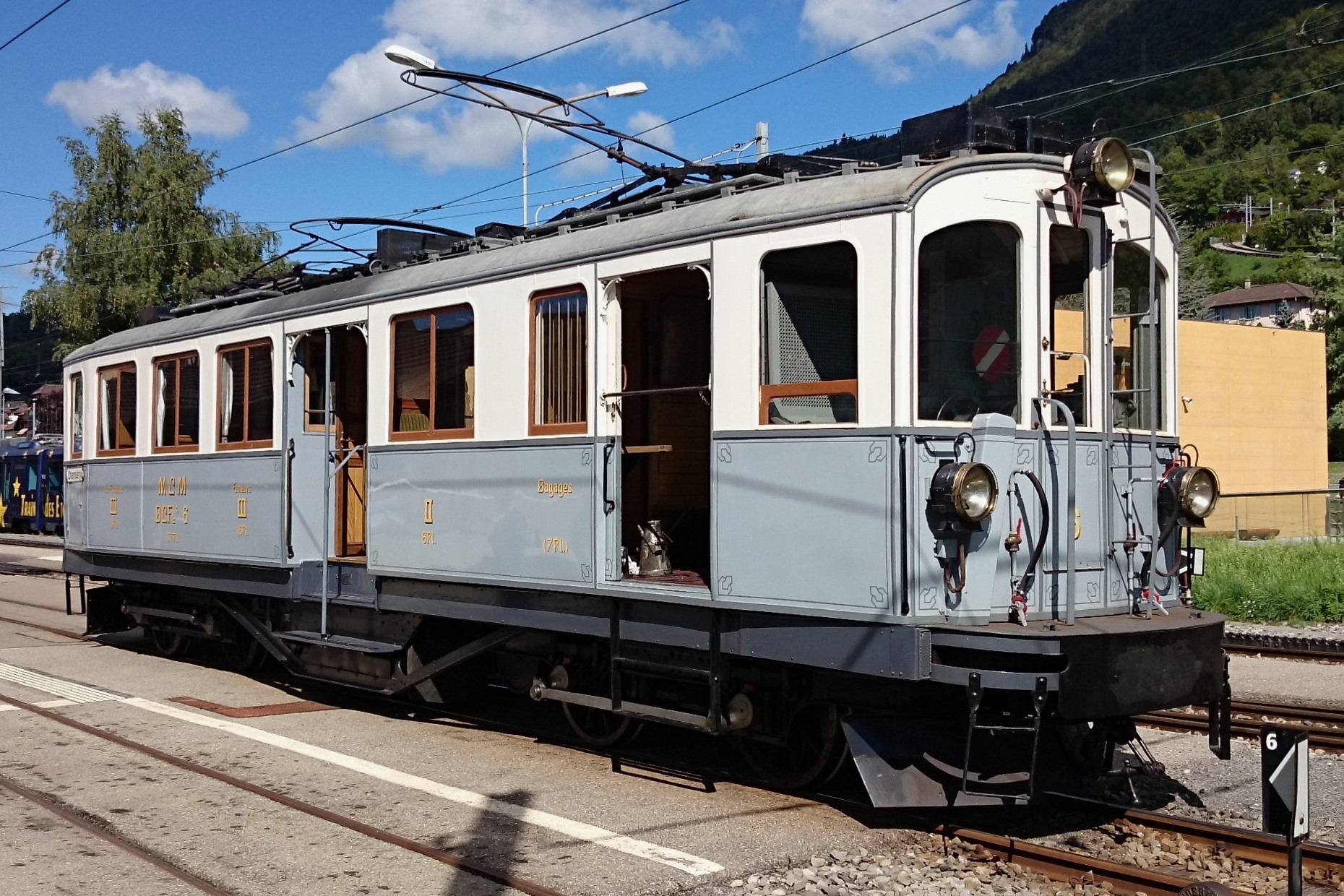
Electric railcar BCFeh 4/4 no.6

The Monthey–Champéry–Morgins railway (French: Chemin de fer Monthey–Champéry–Morgins, MCM) was a metre gauge railway operating in the Chablais region of Switzerland.

The concession to build the line was awarded on 22 June 1899 but the work proceeded slowly. It was the original intention to complete the work at the same time as the Chemin de fer Aigle-Ollon-Monthey, with which it made an end-on junction, the two lines opening together in April 1907. The line eventually opened to passenger traffic on 30 January 1908. There was also to be a branch line, leaving the main line at Val d'Illiez, to Morgins. Although that line was never built due to poor economic expectations, the village remained in the company title until amalgamation.

Nowadays the line is part of a larger, regional system operated, along with local bus services, by the Transports Publics du Chablais.

At least one railcar was preserved, a BCFeh 4/4 no.6. It runs at the Blonay–Chamby Museum Railway.
