= Meiringen–Reichenbach–Aareschlucht tramway =

Tramway line in Bern, Switzerland

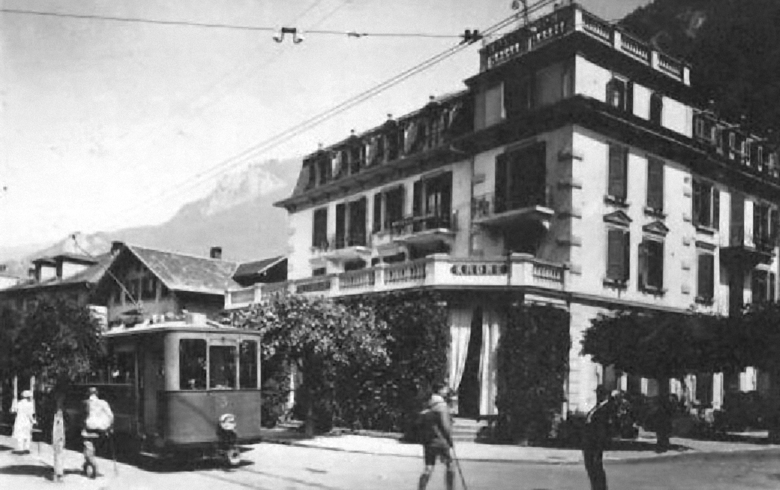
- Car Ce2/2 3 in front of the Hotel Krone in Meirigen

Overview
- Status: Closed and removed
- Locale: Canton of Bern, Switzerland
- Termini: Meiringen; Aare Gorge (West entrance)
- Stations: 11

Service
- Services: 1

History
- Opened: 1912-08-24
- Closed: 1956-09-16

Technical
- Line length: 2.773 kilometres (1.723 mi)
- Track gauge: 1,000 mm (3 ft 3 3/8 in)
- Minimum radius: 20 metres (66 ft)
- Electrification: 500 V, DC, overhead
- Maximum incline: 3.9%

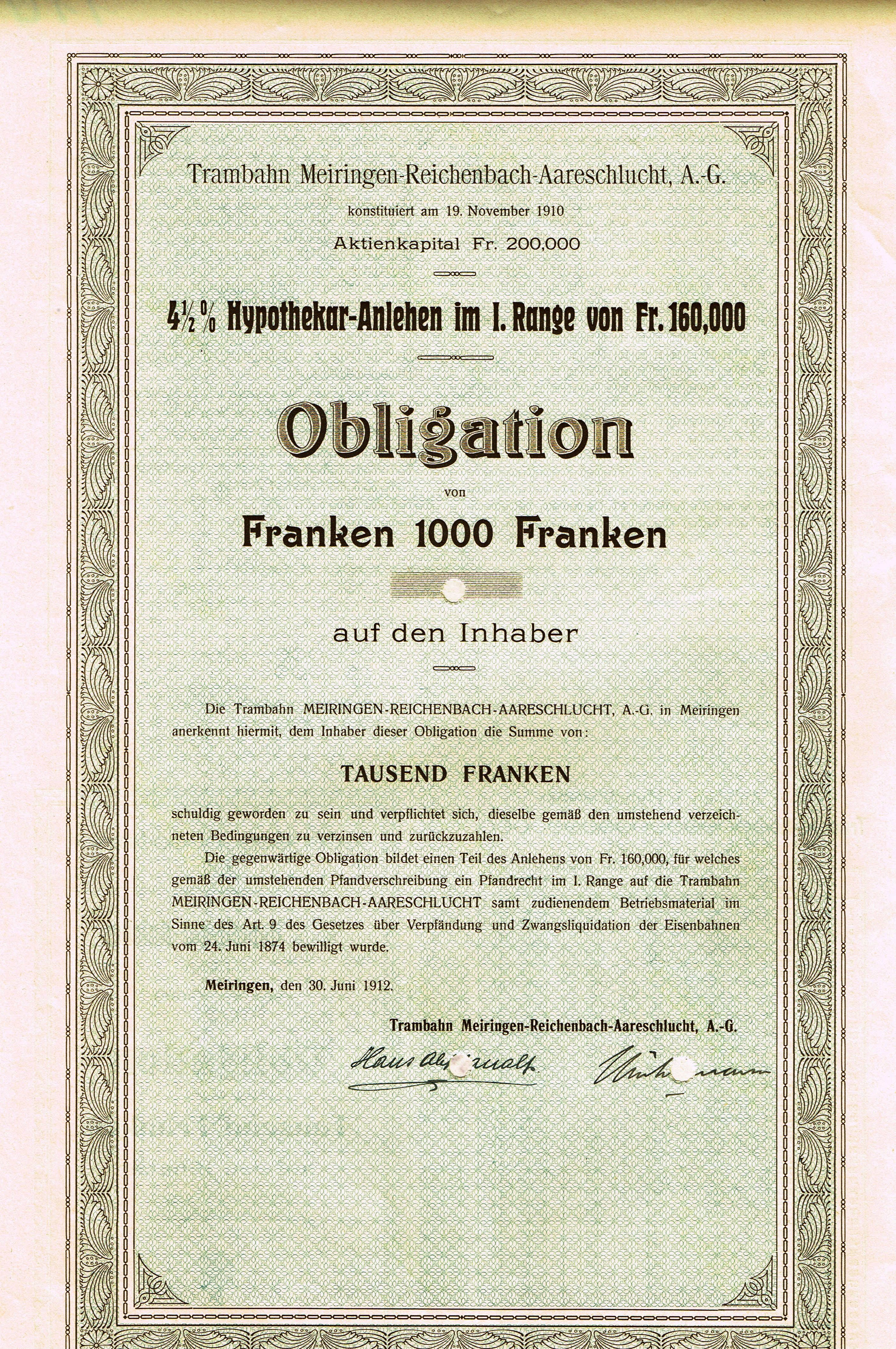
Bond of the Trambahn Meiringen–Reichenbach–Aareschlucht AG, issued 30. June 1912

The Meiringen–Reichenbach–Aareschlucht tramway (German: Trambahn Meiringen–Reichenbach–Aareschlucht, MRA) was a metre gauge electric tramway in the Swiss canton of Bern. It linked the town of Meiringen with the tourist attractions of the Reichenbach Falls, where it served the lower station of the Reichenbachfall Funicular, and the Aare Gorge, where it served the gorge's western entrance.

The tramway was opened in 1912, and closed in 1956, being replaced by a bus service. The line was electrified at 500 V DC. It had a length of 2.773 kilometres (1.723 mi), with 11 stops, a maximum gradient of 3.9% and a minimum radius of 20 metres (66 ft). After 1926, the tramway crossed the Meiringen–Innertkirchen railway by a level crossing at Alpbach; whilst both lines were of the same gauge there was no other connection between the lines.

The only visible remains of line is the tram depot, in the centre of Meiringen and now used by the municipality, and the abutments of the bridge used to cross the Aare river.

== Bibliography ==
- Sigrist, Sandro (2000). Trambahn Meiringen–Reichenbach–Aareschlucht. Leissigen: Prellbock Druck & Verlag. ISBN 3-907579-17-8.
