= Langenthal-Jura Railway =

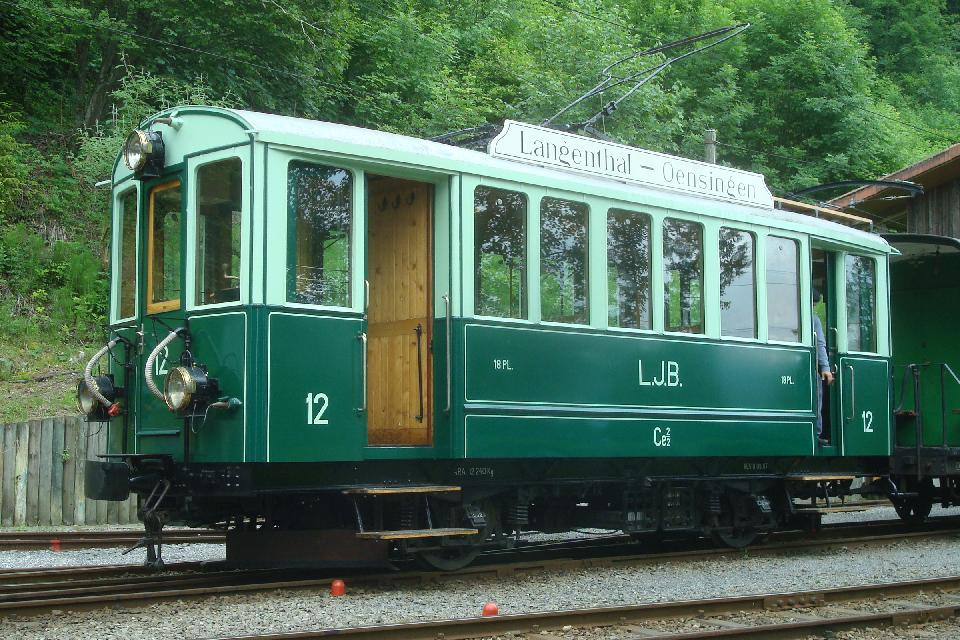
- A preserved Ce 2/2 in 2012

Overview
- Dates of operation: 1907–1958
- Successor: Oberaargau-Jura Railways

Technical
- Track length: 11 kilometres (6.8 mi)

The Langenthal-Jura Railway (German: Langenthal-Jura-Bahn, LJB) was a former railway company in Switzerland. It merged in 1958 with the Langenthal–Melchnau-Bahn (lit. 'Langenthal-Melchnau Railway', LMB) to form Oberaargau-Jura Railways (German: Oberaargau-Jura-Bahnen, OJB), which then operated the then still 11 km-long, metre-gauge LJB line from Langenthal to Niederbipp. After further mergers, the Langenthal–Oensingen railway line has been part of the Aare Seeland mobil (ASm) since 1999.

== History ==
The Langenthal-Jura Railway, which was based in Langenthal (BE), opened its metre-gauge line, mostly located in the canton of Bern, from Langenthal via Niederbipp to Oensingen Schulhaus in the canton of Solothurn on 26 October 1907. It has been electrified at 1200 Volt DC since its opening. It operated class LJB CFe 4/4 railcars, among others.

Langenthal was also the starting point of the metre-gauge Langenthal–Melchnau-Bahn, which opened on 6 October 1917. Its line to Melchnau began at Gaswerk station as a branch of the Langenthal–Jura-Bahn Railway. Cooperation was planned from the very beginning, so LMB not only selected the same electrification system, but also contracted all operations to the Langenthal-Jura Railway. With the opening of the Solothurn-Niederbipp Railway (Solothurn-Niederbipp-Bahn, SNB) on 9 January 1918, another connection to a metre-gauge railway was opened in Niederbipp. The SNB also sought contact with the LJB and entered into an operating contract, adopted the electrification system of the Langenthal-Jura Railway and ran individual trains to Oensingen.

The Langenthal-Jura Railway connected with the Swiss Federal Railways (SBB) at the stations of Langenthal, Niederbipp and Oensingen SBB. On the Niederbipp–Oensingen section, it was in direct competition with the SBB and initially did well. Although it had a longer travel time, due to its poorer routing as a tramway, it offered a much better timetable than the SBB then operated for regional traffic. The route also allowed somewhat more connections from Oensingen and more services for the workforce of the companies in the Balsthal industrial district of Klus (including Von Roll) to be provided by the Langenthal-Jura Railway or from 1918 by the SNB; Klus itself has been served since 1899 by the standard gauge Oensingen—Balsthal railway (Oensingen-Balsthal-Bahn, OeBB).

As the SBB strongly expanded regional services on the Olten–Oensingen–Solothurn line in the following years, passenger numbers collapsed; the SNB service to Solothurn was no longer able to compete with the SBB over the entire line and concentrated on serving the traffic between Solothurn and Niederbipp. Due to a lack of passengers, the LJB closed the most unprofitable section, the about one and a half kilometre-long Oensingen SBB–Oensingen Schulhaus section on 14 May 1928 and subsequently dismantled it.

During the Second World War, the Langenthal-Jura Railway ran into financial hardship and asked the authorities for financial aid. The Canton of Berne essentially approved support for the almost two and a half kilometers long Niederbipp–Oensingen section. This had long since become rundown and unprofitable as a result of competition with the SBB, it had been relocated on state roads, it had fallen into a poor condition due to a lack of maintenance and it also had the political disadvantage of running to another canton. Thus on 9 May 1943 operations stopped and the tracks were dismantled immediately—iron and copper were sought-after raw materials in the war years and the company needed the additional income. Niederbipp became a terminal station for the LJB and the SNB, with a remnant of the line used as a siding.

The 40-year cooperation between the Langenthal-Jura Railway and the LMB was eventually followed by a legal merger: on 1 January 1958 the Langenthal-Jura Railway and the LMB merged to form Oberaargau-Jura Railways (Oberaargau-Jura-Bahnen, OJB). As a result, a new cooperation agreement was signed in 1959 with the SNB. With the contract, the LJB/OJB workshop in Langenthal also became a workshop for the SNB, which could abandon its own rolling stock maintenance.

Since the timetable change in December 2012, the line to Oensingen station has been served again. The new line runs parallel to the SBB line between Niederbipp and Oensingen, and also has a station to serve the industrial area there. This line is not identical to the original line between Niederbipp and Oensingen.

== Transporter wagon yards ==
The LJB opened the first transporter wagon yard for the transport of standard-gauge freight wagons on a metre-gauge line in Switzerland in Langenthal on 29 December 1909. The delivery points, which initially ended at Aarwangen, were extended to Bannwil on 7 March 1913. The LMB carried transporter wagons to Melchnau from its opening in 1917. Since the LMB's opening, deliveries to Melchnau have also been possible. The SNB, which was opened on 9 January 1918, included another transporter wagon yard, located in Niederbipp, which was also used by the LJB. It served delivery points as far as Bannwil from Niederbipp. The whole LJB line has been served from Niederbipp since 1943.
