= Vinifuni Ligerz–Prêles =

Funicular at Lake Biel, Switzerland

Vinifuni Ligerz-Prêles
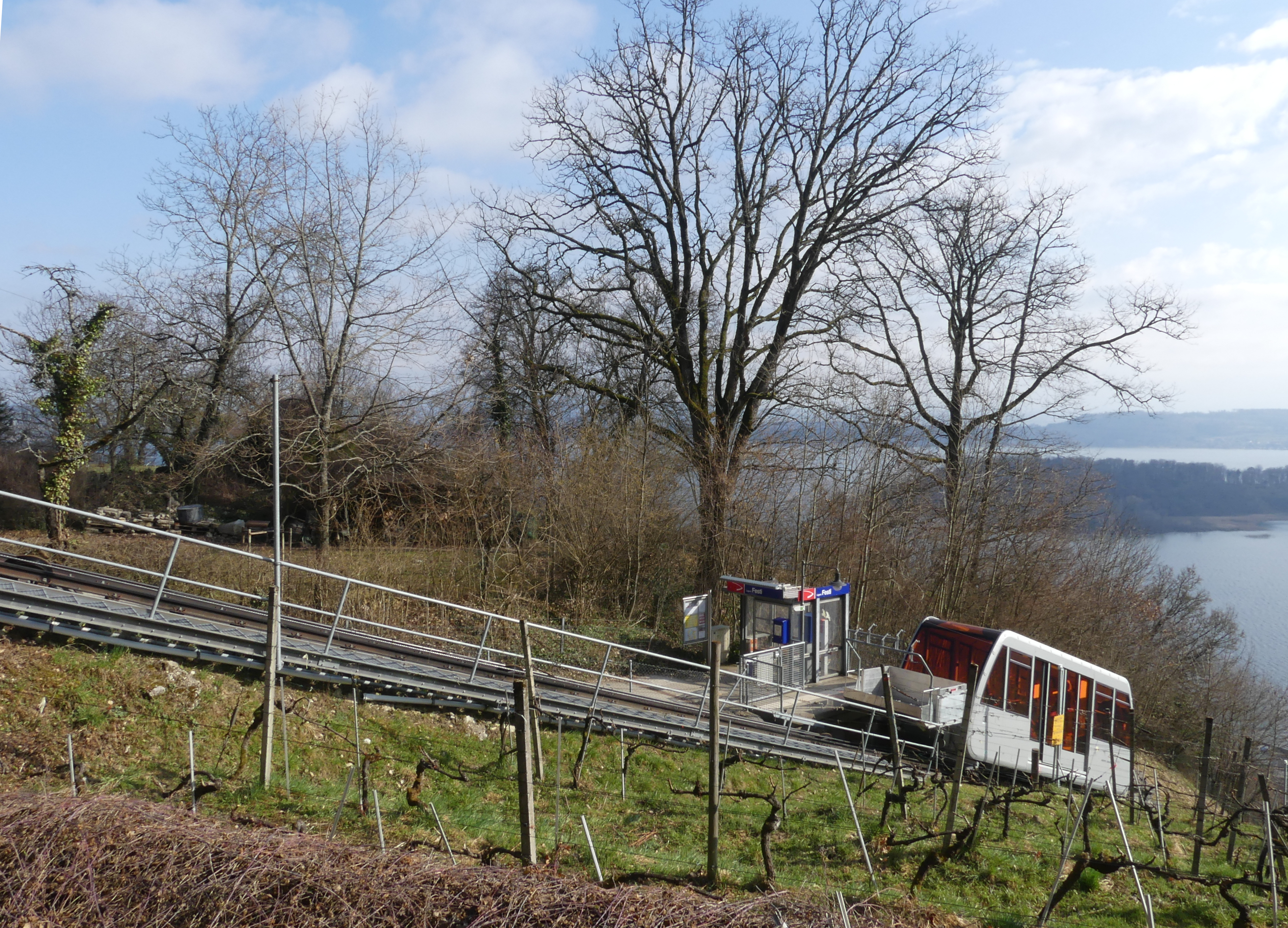
- car at intermediary station Festi/Château, Lake Biel in background, vineyard in the foreground (2021)

Overview
- Other name(s): Chemin de fer funiculaire Gléresse-Montagne de Diesse; Ligerz-Tessenberg-Bahn; Standseilbahn Ligerz-Prêles; Seilbahn Ligerz-Prêles (Tessenberg)
- Status: In operation
- Owner: Aare Seeland mobil AG (since 2003); Chemin de fer funiculaire Gléresse-Montagne de Diesse (1912–1997), Ligerz-Tessenberg-Bahn AG (LTB) (1997–2003) (Note: also Chemin de fer funiculaire Gléresse-Montagne de Diesse SA (LTB))
- Locale: Canton of Bern, Switzerland
- Termini: "Ligerz (Talstation)" at Bahnhofplatz / Dorfgasse 1; "Prêles" at Route de la Neuveville 1
- Stations: 4 (including "Pilgerweg", "Festi/Château")

Service
- Type: Funicular (since 2004: lift)
- Route number: 2016
- Operator(s): Aare Seeland mobil AG (short: asm)
- Rolling stock: 1 for 50 passengers (since 2004); 2 for 60 each (1949–2004), 2 for 40 each (1912–1949)

History
- Opened: 8 June 1912 (113 years ago)
- Concession: 1906
- Single-car, lift: 18 May 2004

Technical
- Line length: 1,198 m (3,930 ft)
- Number of tracks: 1
- Track gauge: 1,000 mm (3 ft 3 3/8 in)
- Electrification: from opening
- Operating speed: 5.0 metres per second (16 ft/s)
- Highest elevation: 820 m (2,690 ft)
- Maximum incline: 40%

Vinifuni Ligerz–Prêles is a funicular above Lake Biel in the Canton of Bern, Switzerland. The line leads from Ligerz/Gléresse at 437 m (1,434 ft) to Prêles at 820 m (2,690 ft) on Tessenberg, a plateau part of the Jura range. The line has a length of 1,198 m (3,930 ft) with a difference of elevation of 383 m (1,257 ft) and a maximum incline of 40%. The single track funicular has had only one car since 2004, when the passing loop and the second car were removed. Two intermediate stations are Pilgerweg at 487 m (1,598 ft) and Festi/Château at 577 m (1,893 ft). The lower station is next to Ligerz railway station and a landing stage for Lake Biel passenger ships.

The line opened in 1910 after the Swiss Federal Assembly granted a concession in 1906.

The funicular is owned and operated by Aare Seeland mobil AG since 2003. The railway company had absorbed Ligerz-Tessenberg-Bahn AG (LTB), founded in 1910 and initially named Chemin de fer funiculaire Gléresse-Montagne de Diesse.

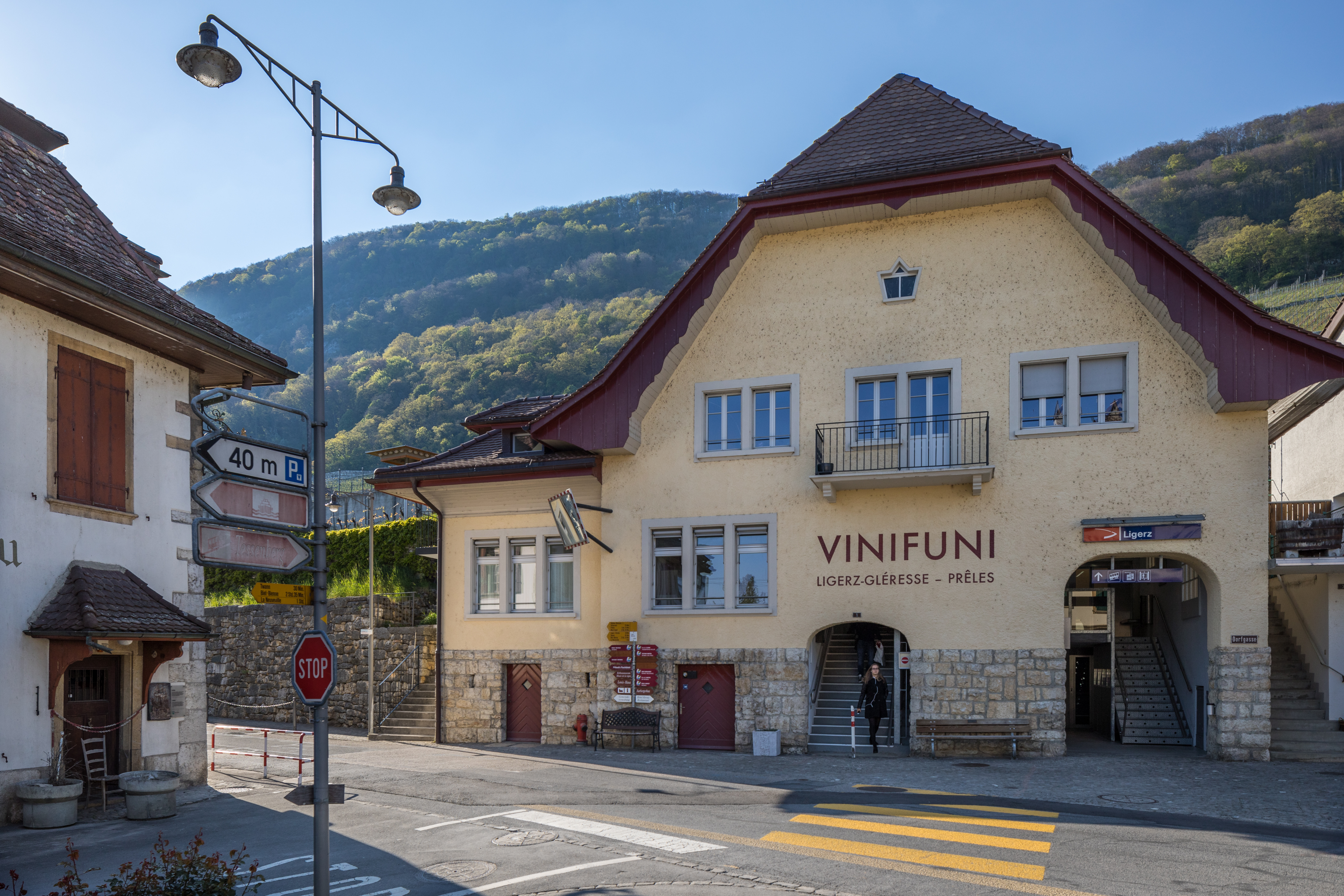
lower station (2017)

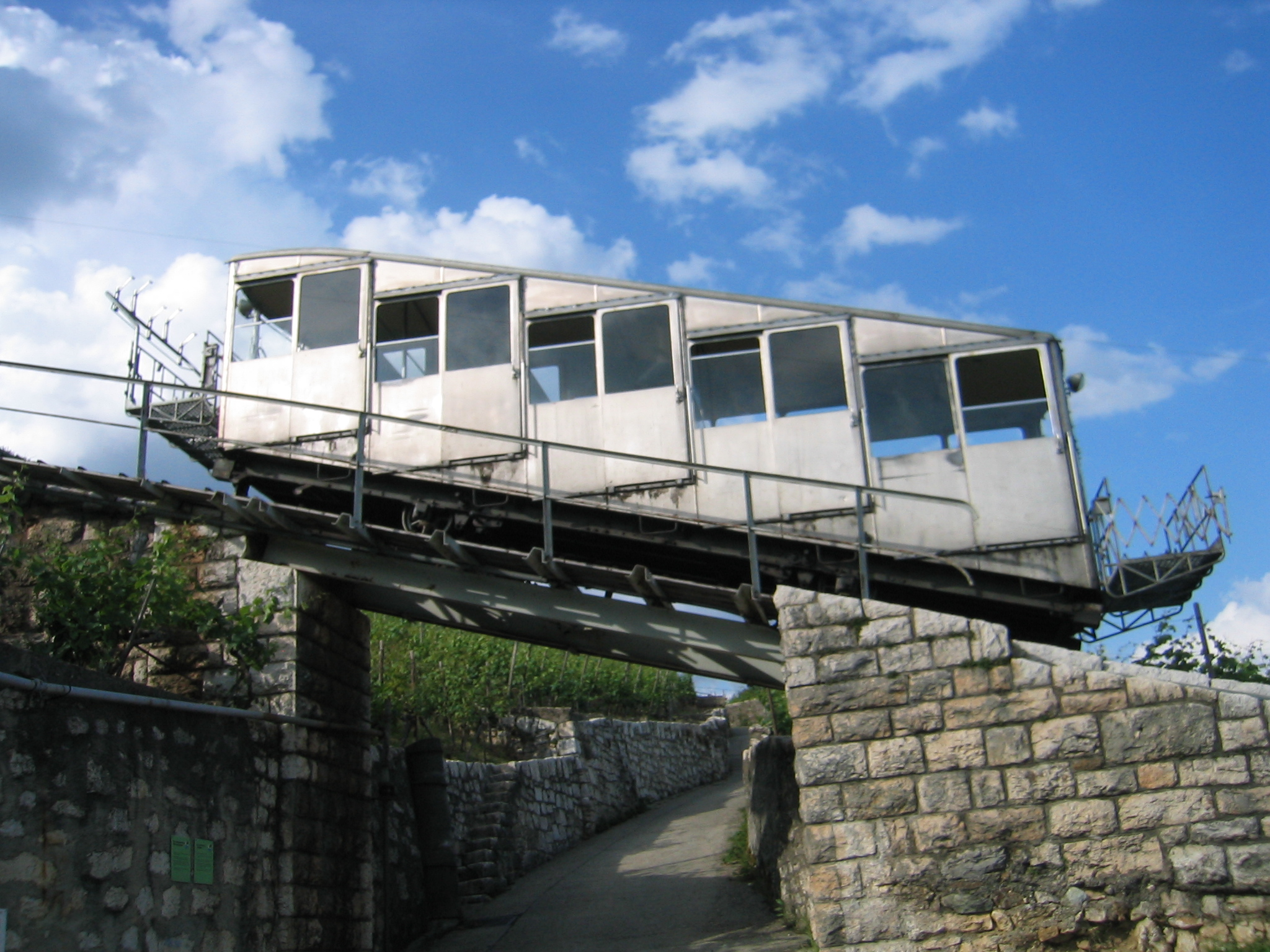
former funicular car on bridge (2003)

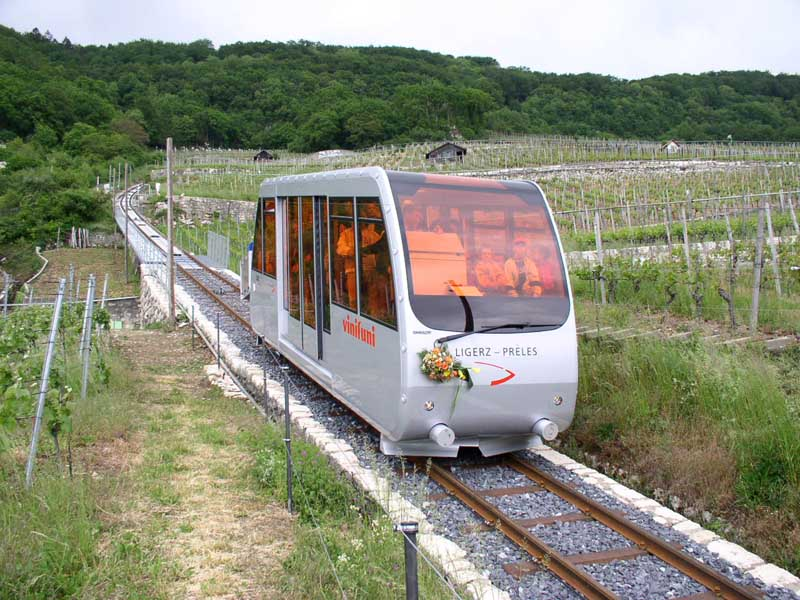
car in the vineyards (2005)

== See also ==
- List of funicular railways
- List of funiculars in Switzerland
