= Niederbipp railway station =

Railway station in Niederbipp, Switzerland

Niederbipp
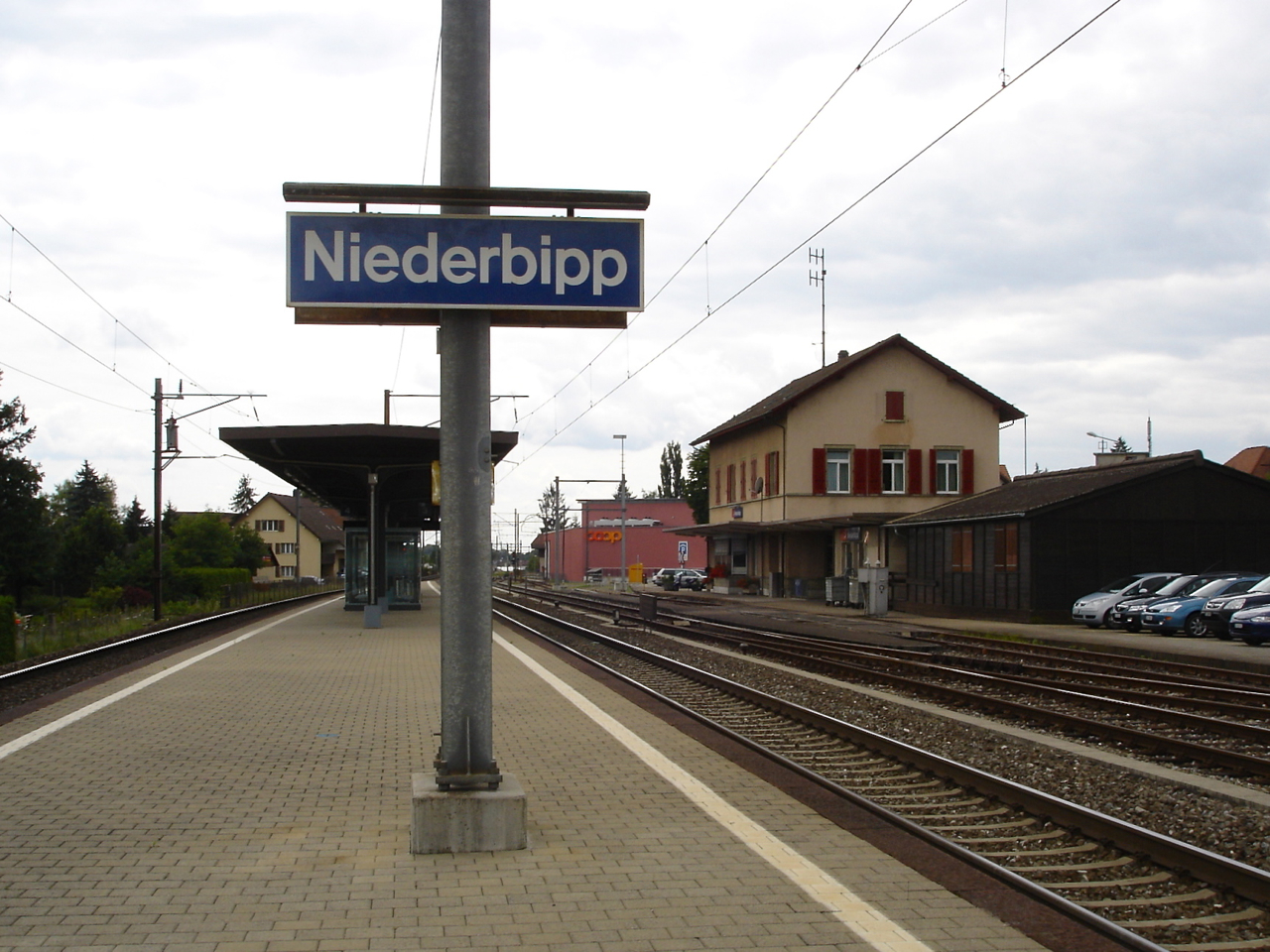
- The station building in 2007

General information
- Location: Niederbipp; Switzerland
- Coordinates: 47°16′13″N 7°41′41″E
- Elevation: 468 m (1,535 ft)
- Owner: Swiss Federal Railways
- Lines: Jura Foot line; Langenthal–Oensingen line; Solothurn–Niederbipp line
- Distance: 58.6 km (36.4 mi) from Basel SBB
- Platforms: 3; 1 side platform; 1 island platform
- Tracks: 4
- Train operators: Aare Seeland mobil (asm); Swiss Federal Railways (SBB)

Construction
- Cycle facilities: 93
- Accessible: asm platforms only

Other information
- Station code: 8500211 (NB)
- Fare zone: 279 (Libero)

Passengers
- 2023: 720 per weekday (SBB (excludes asm))

Services
Preceding station	SBB CFF FFS	Following station
Wangen an der Aare towards Biel/Bienne or Oberdorf SO	S20	Oensingen towards Olten
Preceding station	Aare Seeland mobil	Following station
Buchli towards Solothurn	S11	Niederbipp Industrie towards Langenthal
Niederbipp Dorf towards Langenthal	S11	Niederbipp Industrie towards Solothurn
Location

Niederbipp railway station (German: Bahnhof Niederbipp) is a railway station in the municipality of Niederbipp, in the Swiss canton of Bern. It is an intermediate stop on the standard gauge Jura Foot line of Swiss Federal Railways. It is also located at the junction of the 1,000 mm (3 ft 3 3/8 in) gauge Langenthal–Oensingen and Solothurn–Niederbipp lines of Aare Seeland mobil.

== Services ==
As of the December 2023 timetable change, the following services stop at Niederbipp:

- S20: half-hourly service between Olten and Solothurn, with trains continuing from Solothurn to Biel/Bienne, Langendorf, Lommiswil or Oberdorf SO.
- S11: half-hourly service between Solothurn and Langenthal.
