= Deitingen railway station =

Railway station in the Canton of Solothurn, Switzerland

Deitingen
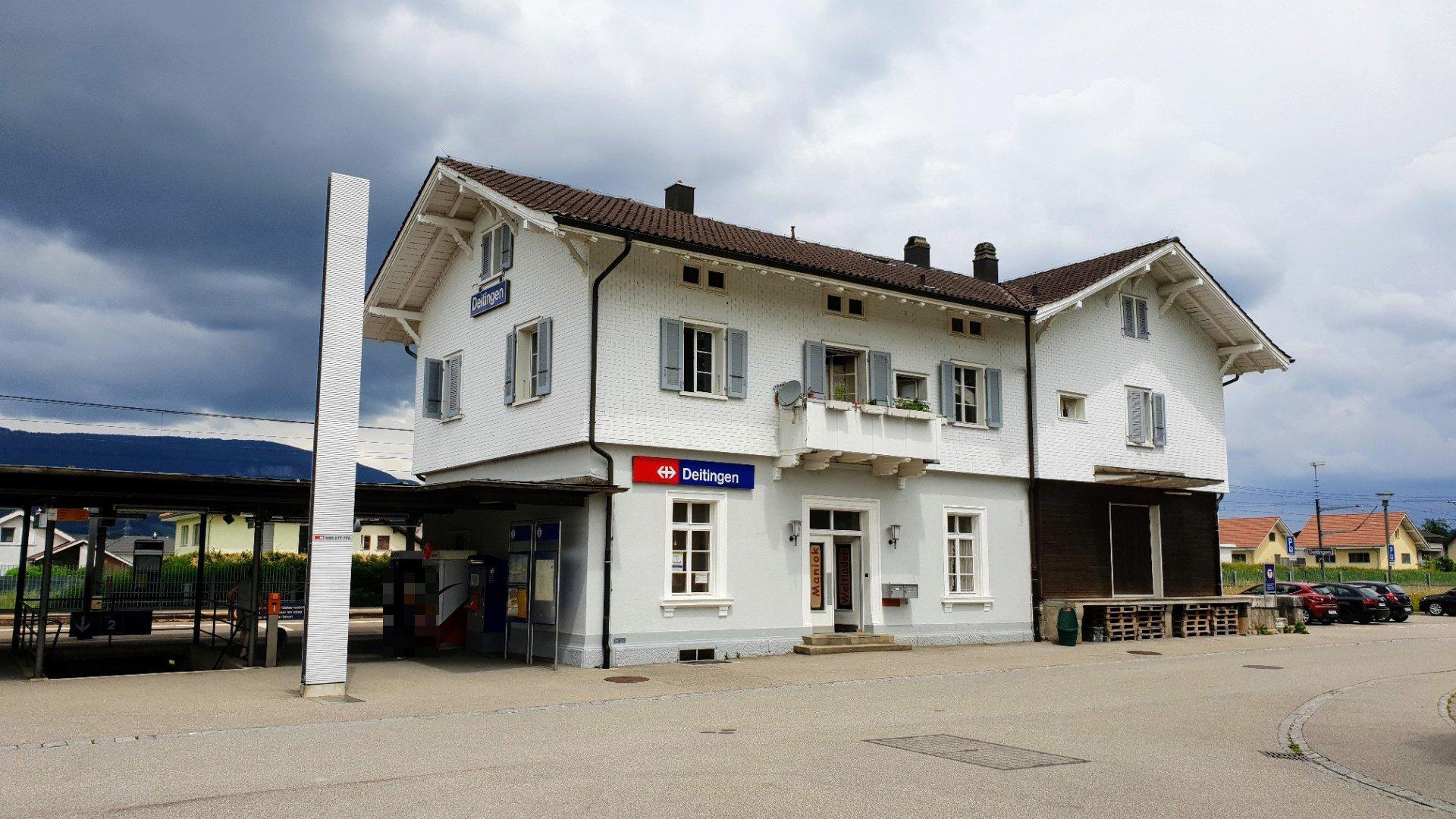
- The station building in 2018

General information
- Location: Deitingen; Switzerland
- Coordinates: 47°13′06″N 7°37′08″E
- Owner: Swiss Federal Railways
- Line: Jura Foot line
- Train operators: Swiss Federal Railways

Services
Preceding station	SBB CFF FFS	Following station
Luterbach-Attisholz towards Biel/Bienne or Oberdorf SO	S20	Wangen an der Aare towards Olten
Location
- Location within Switzerland

Deitingen railway station (German: Bahnhof Deitingen) is a railway station in the municipality of Deitingen, in the Swiss canton of Solothurn. It is an intermediate stop on the standard gauge Jura Foot line and is served by local trains only.

Before the modification of the station around 1998, there were both a western and an eastern siding for freight and infrastructure movements. When those were dismantled, all the switches were removed as well.

== Services ==
As of the December 2021 timetable change, the following services stop at Deitingen:

- S20: half-hourly service between Olten and Solothurn, with trains continuing from Solothurn to Biel/Bienne, Langendorf, Lommiswil or Oberdorf SO.
