= Hägendorf railway station =

Railway station in Switzerland

Hägendorf
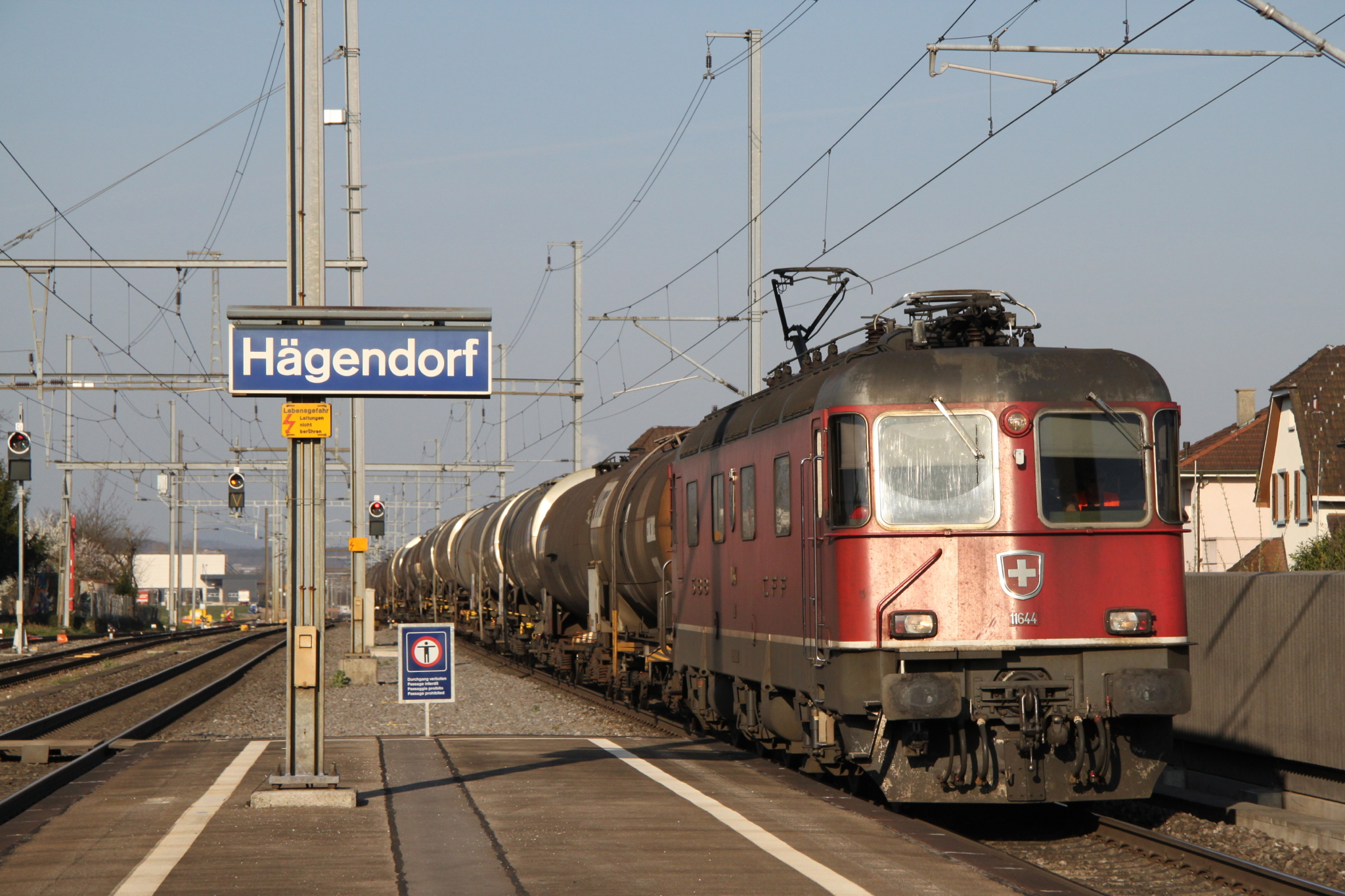
- An SBB-CFF-FFS Re 620 leads a freight train past the station in 2015

General information
- Location: Hägendorf; Switzerland
- Coordinates: 47°19′49″N 7°50′38″E
- Owner: Swiss Federal Railways
- Line: Jura Foot line
- Distance: 45.3 km (28.1 mi) from Basel SBB
- Train operators: Swiss Federal Railways
- Connections: Busbetrieb Olten Gösgen Gäu buses

Passengers
- 2018: 1,800 per weekday

Services
Preceding station	SBB CFF FFS	Following station
Egerkingen towards Biel/Bienne or Oberdorf SO	S20	Wangen bei Olten towards Olten
Location
- Location within Switzerland Location within Canton of Solothurn

Hägendorf railway station (German: Bahnhof Hägendorf) is a railway station in the municipality of Hägendorf, in the Swiss canton of Solothurn. It is an intermediate stop on the standard gauge Jura Foot line of Swiss Federal Railways.

== Services ==
As of the December 2021 timetable change, the following services stop at Hägendorf:

- S20: half-hourly service between Olten and Solothurn, with trains continuing from Solothurn to Biel/Bienne, Langendorf, Lommiswil or Oberdorf SO.
