= Wangen an der Aare railway station =

Railway station in Switzerland

Wangen an der Aare
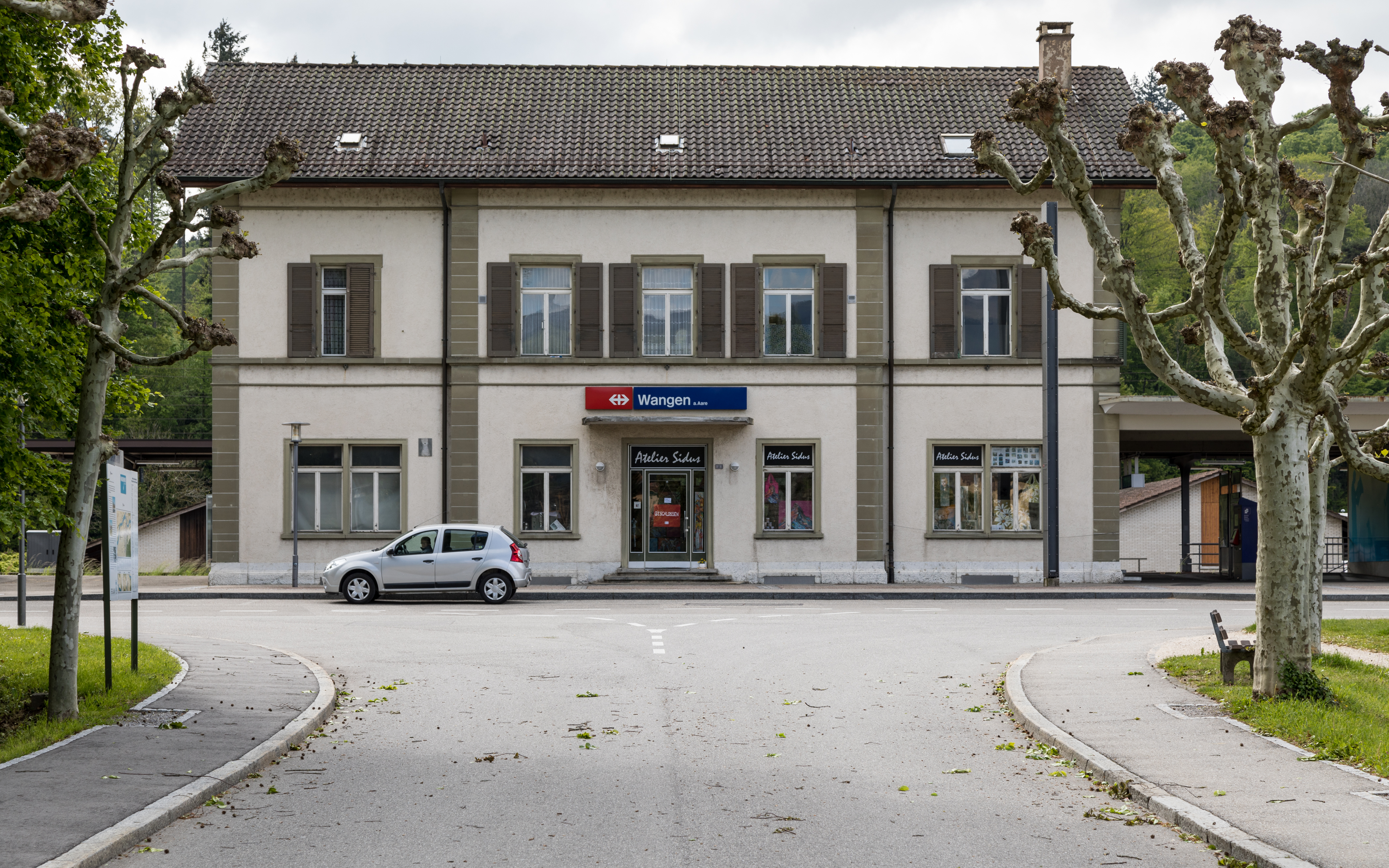
- The station building in 2019

General information
- Location: Wangen an der Aare; Switzerland
- Coordinates: 47°13′55″N 7°39′22″E
- Owner: Swiss Federal Railways
- Line: Jura Foot line
- Distance: 64.3 km (40.0 mi) from Basel SBB
- Train operators: Swiss Federal Railways
- Connections: Aare Seeland mobil buses

Passengers
- 2018: 800 per weekday (excluding asm)

Services
Preceding station	SBB CFF FFS	Following station
Deitingen towards Biel/Bienne or Oberdorf SO	S20	Niederbipp towards Olten
Location
- Location within Switzerland Location within Canton of Bern

Wangen an der Aare railway station (German: Bahnhof Wangen an der Aare) is a railway station in the municipality of Wangen an der Aare, in the Swiss canton of Bern. It is an intermediate stop on the standard gauge Jura Foot line of Swiss Federal Railways.

== Services ==
As of the December 2021 timetable change, the following services stop at Wangen an der Aare:

- S20: half-hourly service between Olten and Solothurn, with trains continuing from Solothurn to Biel/Bienne, Langendorf, Lommiswil or Oberdorf SO.
