= Wangen bei Olten railway station =

Railway station in Switzerland

Wangen bei Olten
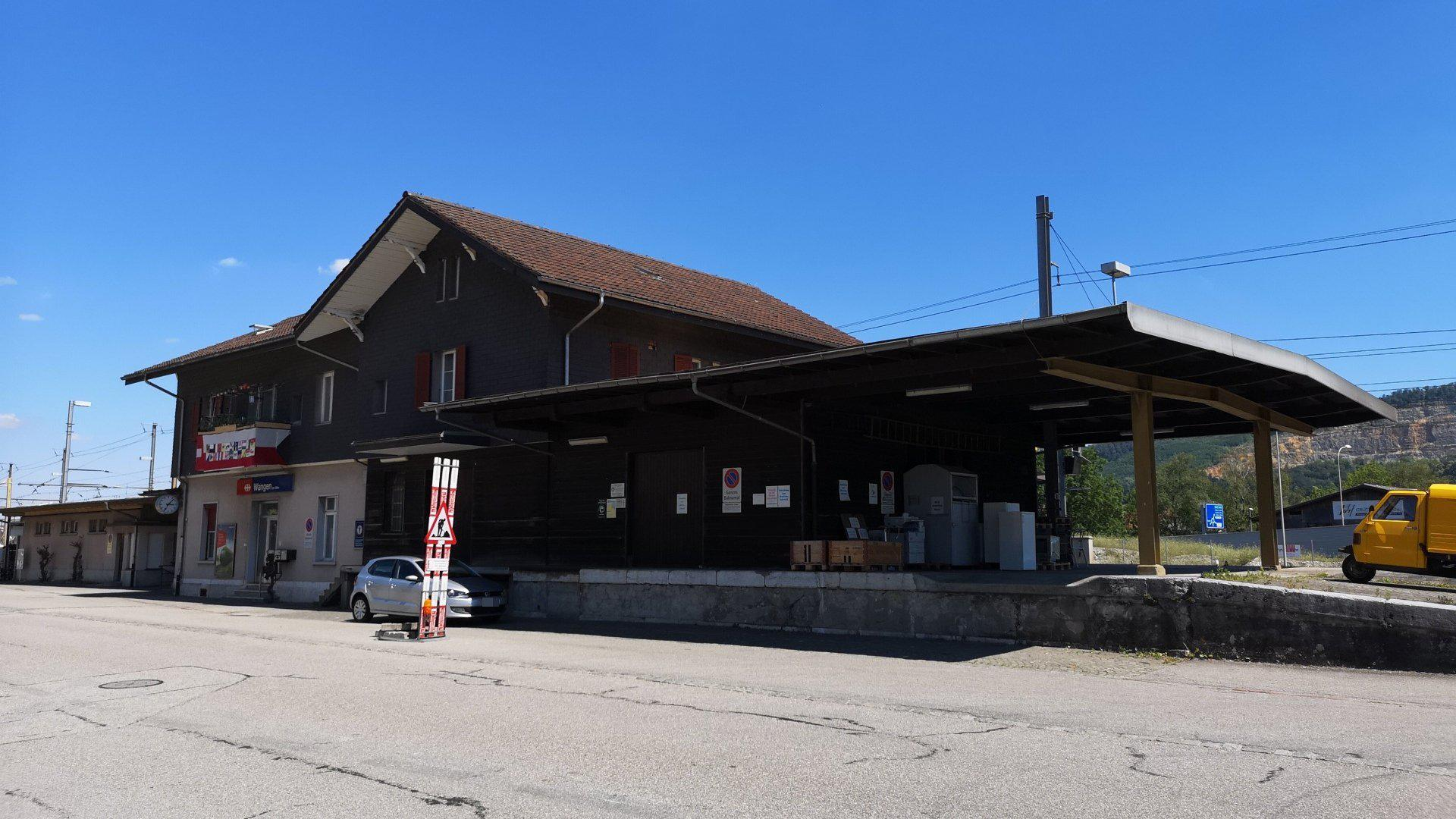
- The station building in 2018

General information
- Location: Wangen bei Olten; Switzerland
- Coordinates: 47°20′29″N 7°52′06″E
- Owner: Swiss Federal Railways
- Line: Jura Foot line
- Distance: 43.0 km (26.7 mi) from Basel SBB
- Train operators: Swiss Federal Railways

Passengers
- 2018: 990 per weekday

Services
Preceding station	SBB CFF FFS	Following station
Hägendorf towards Biel/Bienne or Oberdorf SO	S20	Olten Hammer towards Olten
Location
- Location within Switzerland Location within Canton of Solothurn

Wangen bei Olten railway station (German: Bahnhof Wangen bei Olten) is a railway station in the municipality of Wangen bei Olten, in the Swiss canton of Solothurn. It is an intermediate stop on the standard gauge Jura Foot line of Swiss Federal Railways.

== Services ==
As of the December 2021 timetable change, the following services stop at Wangen bei Olten:

- S20: half-hourly service between Olten and Solothurn, with trains continuing from Solothurn to Biel/Bienne, Langendorf, Lommiswil or Oberdorf SO.
