= Egerkingen railway station =

Railway station in Switzerland

Egerkingen
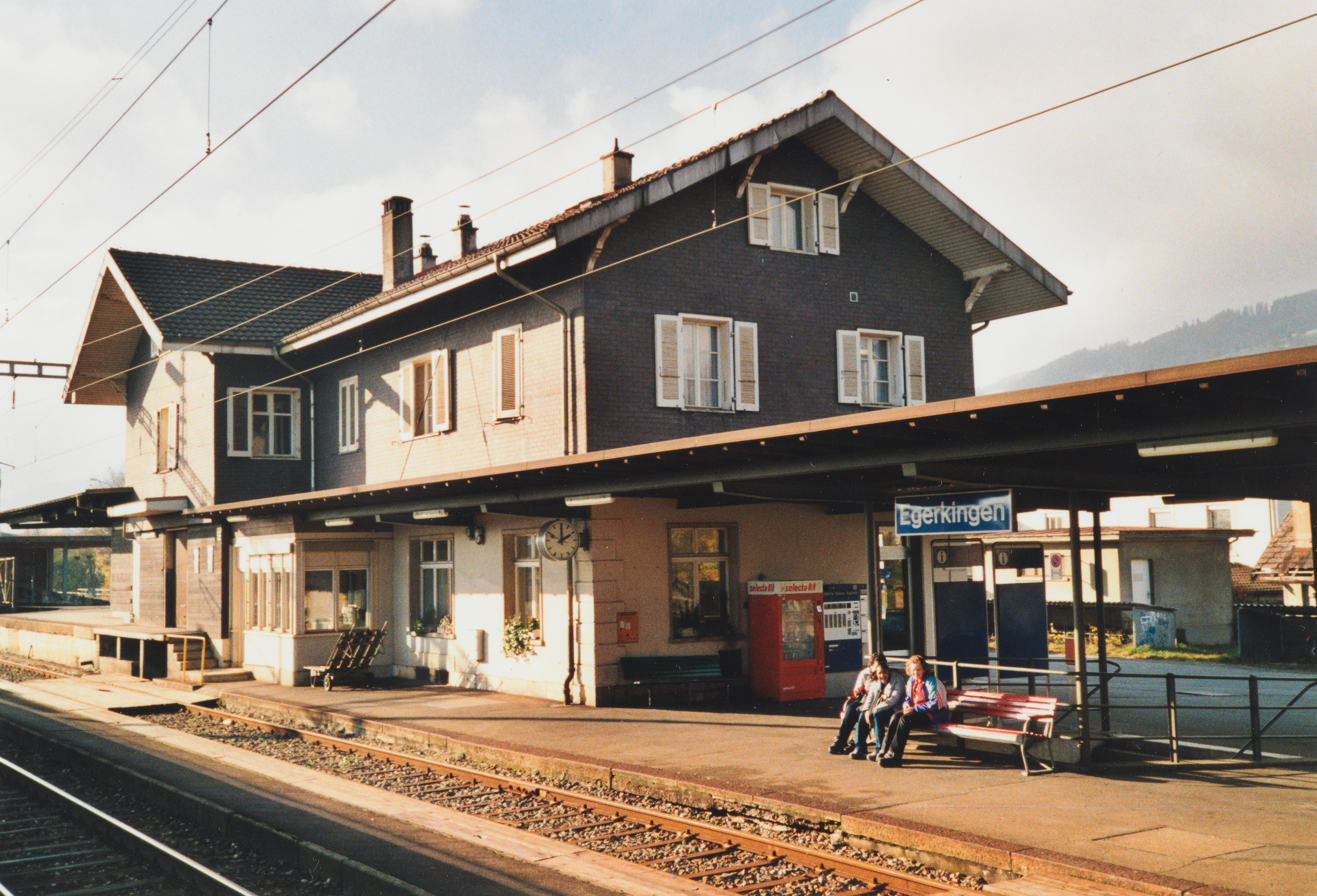
- The station in 2000

General information
- Location: Egerkingen; Switzerland
- Coordinates: 47°18′53″N 7°47′56″E
- Owner: Swiss Federal Railways
- Line: Jura Foot line
- Distance: 49.1 km (30.5 mi) from Basel SBB
- Train operators: Swiss Federal Railways
- Connections: Busbetrieb Olten Gösgen Gäu buses

Passengers
- 2018: 1,500 per weekday

Services
Preceding station	SBB CFF FFS	Following station
Oberbuchsiten towards Biel/Bienne or Oberdorf SO	S20	Hägendorf towards Olten
Location
- Location within Switzerland Location within Canton of Solothurn

Egerkingen railway station (German: Bahnhof Egerkingen) is a railway station in the municipality of Egerkingen, in the Swiss canton of Solothurn. It is an intermediate stop on the standard gauge Jura Foot line of Swiss Federal Railways.

== Services ==
As of the December 2021 timetable change, the following services stop at Egerkingen:

- S20: half-hourly service between Olten and Solothurn, with trains continuing from Solothurn to Biel/Bienne, Langendorf, Lommiswil or Oberdorf SO.
