= Oberbuchsiten railway station =

Railway station in Switzerland

Oberbuchsiten
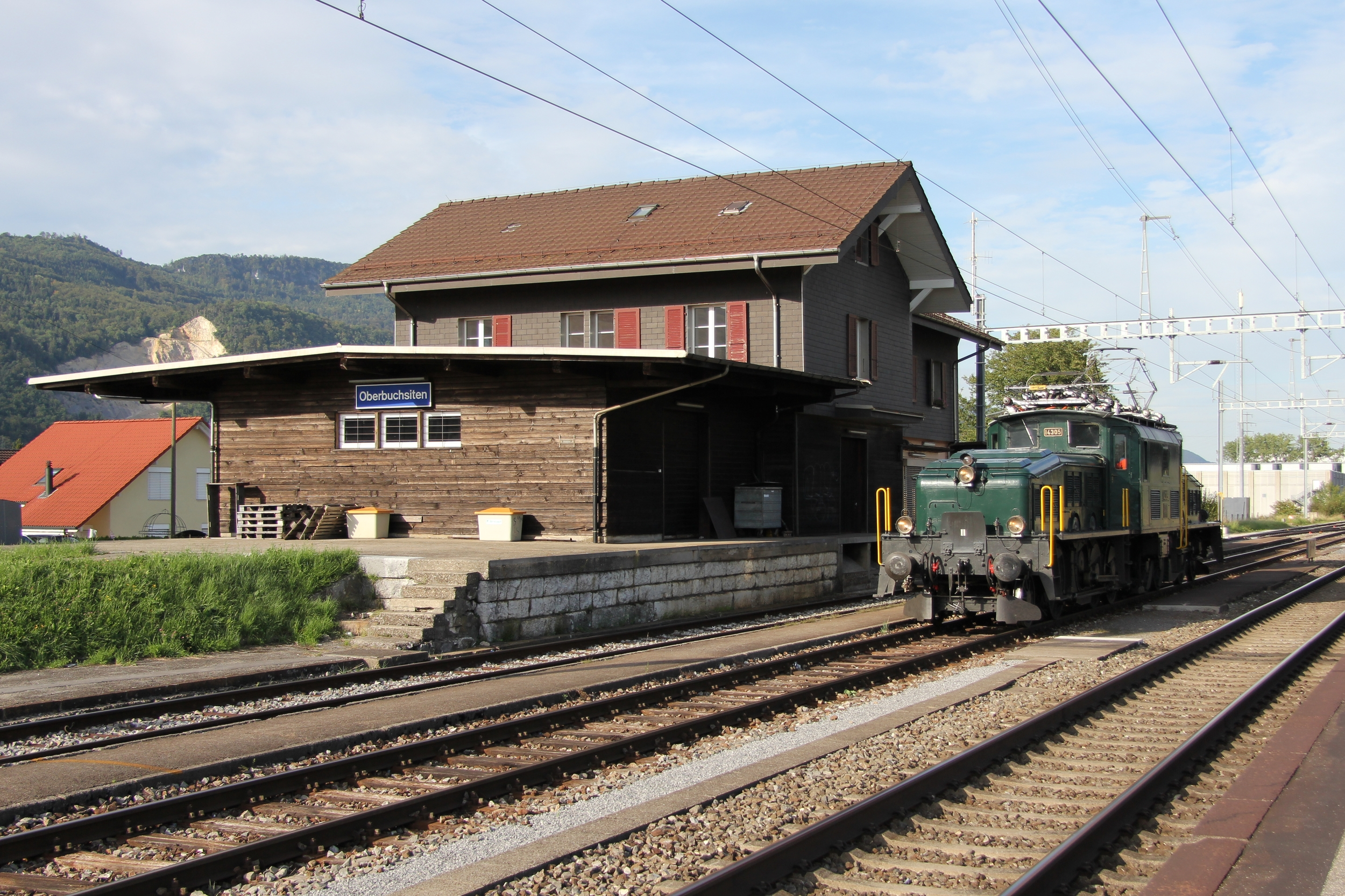
- Historic SBB locomotive at the station in 2011

General information
- Location: Oberbuchsiten; Switzerland
- Coordinates: 47°18′19″N 7°46′18″E
- Owner: Swiss Federal Railways
- Line: Jura Foot line
- Distance: 51.4 km (31.9 mi) from Basel SBB
- Train operators: Swiss Federal Railways

Passengers
- 2018: 850 per weekday

Services
Preceding station	SBB CFF FFS	Following station
Oensingen towards Biel/Bienne or Oberdorf SO	S20	Egerkingen towards Olten
Location
- Location within Switzerland Location within Canton of Solothurn

Oberbuchsiten railway station (German: Bahnhof Oberbuchsiten) is a railway station in the municipality of Oberbuchsiten, in the Swiss canton of Solothurn. It is an intermediate stop on the standard gauge Jura Foot line of Swiss Federal Railways.

== Services ==
As of the December 2021 timetable change, the following services stop at Oberbuchsiten:

- S20: half-hourly service between Olten and Solothurn, with trains continuing from Solothurn to Biel/Bienne, Langendorf, Lommiswil or Oberdorf SO.
