= Olten Hammer railway station =

Railway station in Switzerland

Olten Hammer
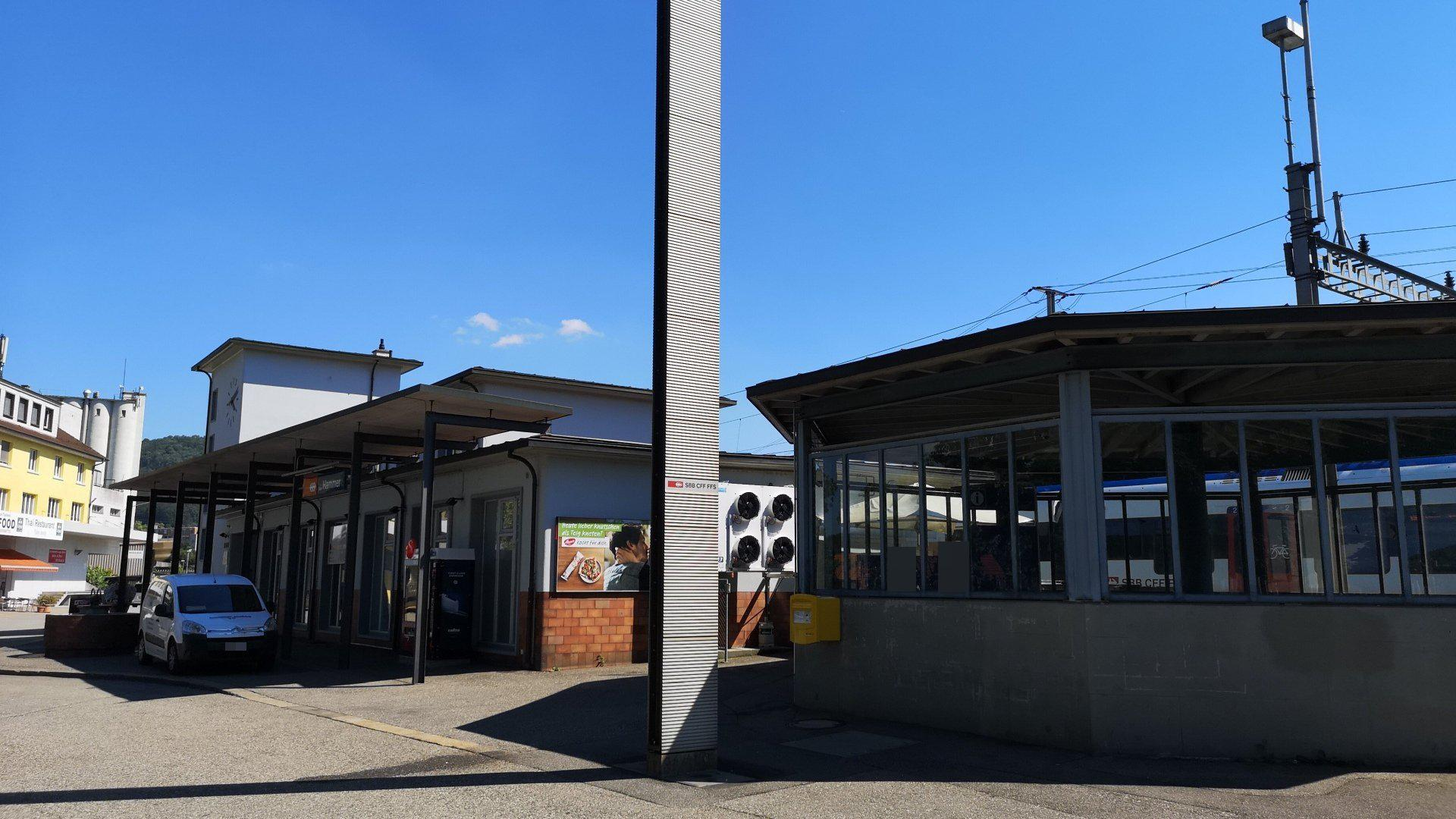
- The station building in 2018

General information
- Location: Olten; Switzerland
- Coordinates: 47°20′55″N 7°53′52″E
- Owner: Swiss Federal Railways
- Line: Jura Foot line
- Distance: 40.6 km (25.2 mi) from Basel SBB
- Train operators: Swiss Federal Railways

Passengers
- 2018: 530 per weekday

Services
| Preceding station | SBB CFF FFS | Following station |
|---|---|---|
| Wangen bei Olten towards Biel/Bienne or Oberdorf SO | S20 | Olten Terminus |
Location
- Location within Switzerland Location within Canton of Solothurn

Olten Hammer railway station (German: Bahnhof Olten Hammer) is a railway station in the municipality of Olten, in the Swiss canton of Solothurn. It is an intermediate stop on the standard gauge Jura Foot line of Swiss Federal Railways.

== Services ==
As of the December 2021 timetable change, the following services stop at Olten Hammer:

- S20: half-hourly service between Olten and Solothurn, with trains continuing from Solothurn to Biel/Bienne, Langendorf, Lommiswil or Oberdorf SO.
