= Luterbach-Attisholz railway station =

Railway station in Switzerland

Luterbach-Attisholz
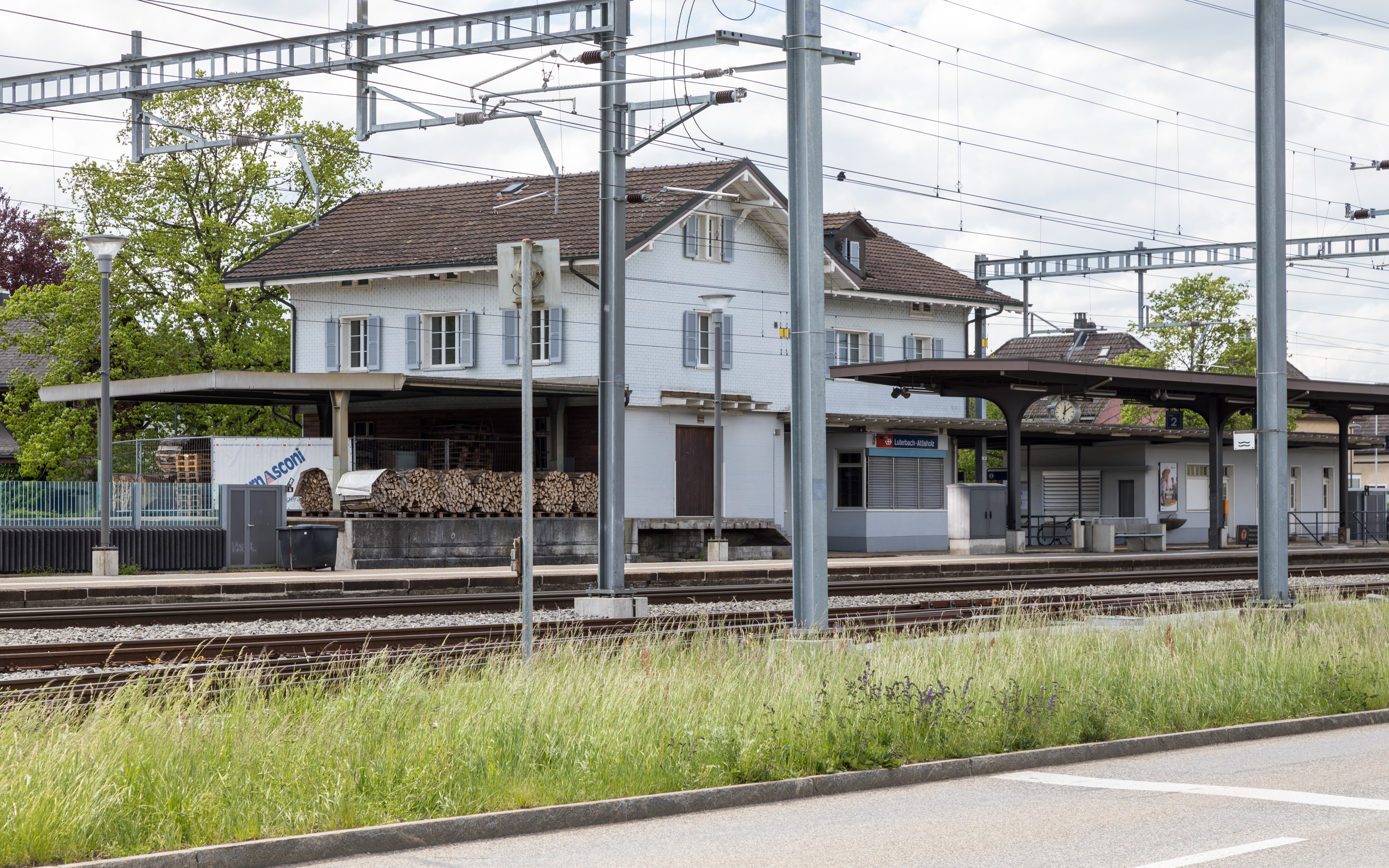
- The station building in 2019

General information
- Location: Luterbach; Switzerland
- Coordinates: 47°13′02″N 7°35′01″E
- Owner: Swiss Federal Railways
- Line: Jura Foot line
- Train operators: Swiss Federal Railways

Services
| Preceding station | SBB CFF FFS | Following station |
|---|---|---|
| Solothurn towards Biel/Bienne or Oberdorf SO | S20 | Deitingen towards Olten |
Location
- Location within Switzerland

Luterbach-Attisholz railway station (German: Bahnhof Luterbach-Attisholz) is a railway station in the municipality of Luterbach, in the Swiss canton of Solothurn. It is an intermediate stop on the standard gauge Jura Foot line and is served by local trains only.

== Services ==
As of the December 2021 timetable change, the following services stop at Luterbach-Attisholz:

- S20: half-hourly service between Olten and Solothurn, with trains continuing from Solothurn to Biel/Bienne, Langendorf, Lommiswil or Oberdorf SO.
