= Oensingen railway station =

Railway station in Oensingen, Switzerland

Oensingen
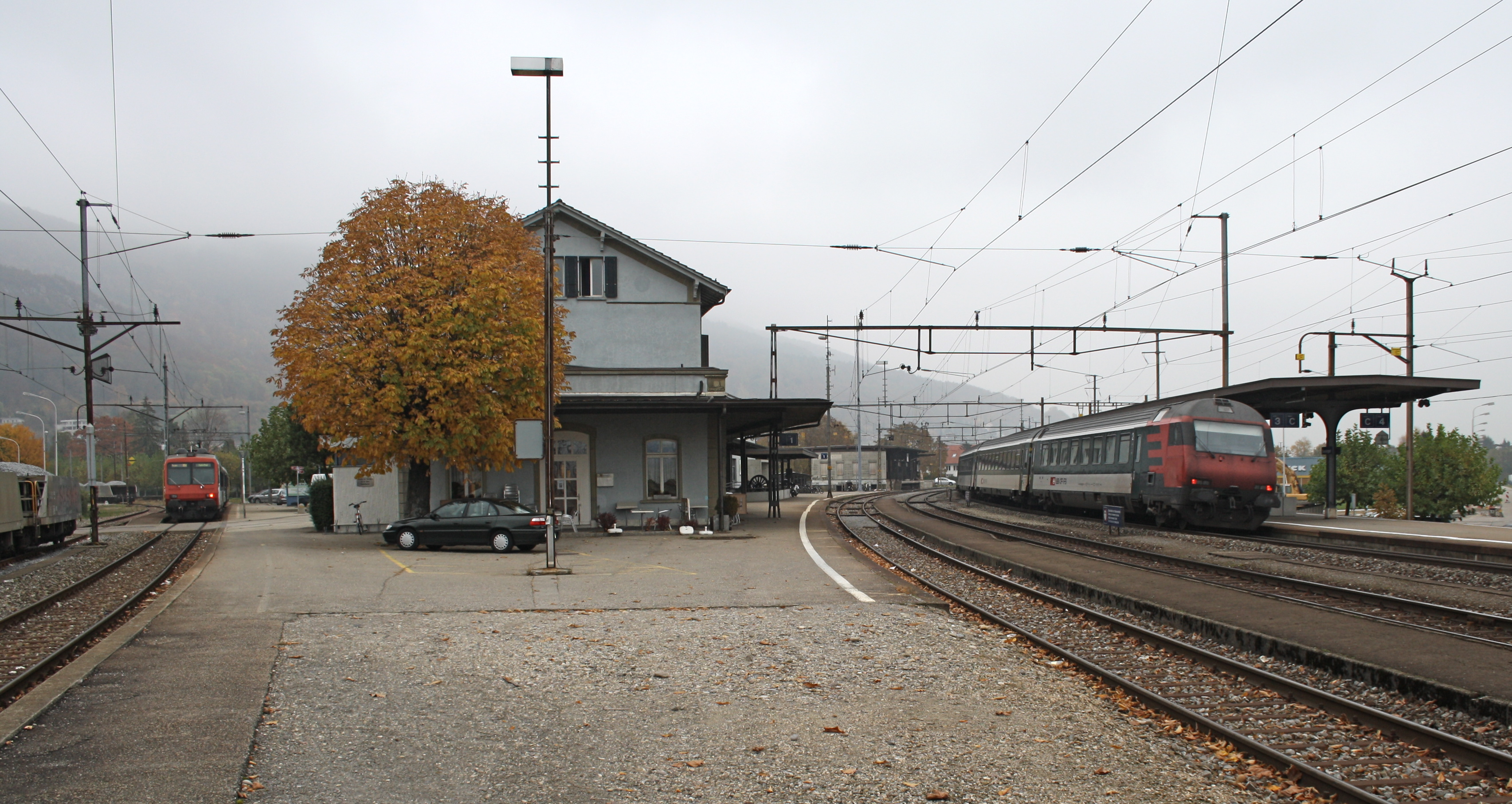
- The station in 2009: the OeBB tracks are to the left; SBB to the right

General information
- Location: Oensingen; Switzerland
- Coordinates: 47°17′06″N 7°42′36″E
- Elevation: 462 m (1,516 ft)
- Owner: Swiss Federal Railways
- Lines: Jura Foot line; Langenthal–Oensingen line; Oensingen–Balsthal line
- Distance: 56.6 km (35.2 mi) from Basel SBB
- Platforms: 5: 1 side platform; 2 island platforms
- Tracks: 8
- Train operators: Aare Seeland mobil (asm); Oensingen-Balsthal-Bahn (OeBB); Swiss Federal Railways (SBB)
- Connections: PostAuto AG buses; Busbetrieb Olten Gösgen Gäu bus line

Construction
- Parking: 147
- Cycle facilities: 164
- Accessible: Yes

Other information
- Station code: 8500212 (OEN)
- Fare zone: 527 (A-Welle)

Passengers
- 2023: 5'600 per weekday (SBB (excluding ASM))

Services
Preceding station	SBB CFF FFS	Following station
Solothurn towards Biel/Bienne	IR 55	Olten towards Zürich HB
Niederbipp towards Biel/Bienne or Oberdorf SO	S20	Oberbuchsiten towards Olten
Terminus	S22	Klus towards Balsthal
Preceding station	Aare Seeland mobil	Following station
Niederbipp Industrie towards Solothurn	S11	Reverses direction
Niederbipp Industrie towards Langenthal	S11	Reverses direction
Location

Oensingen railway station (German: Bahnhof Oensingen) is a railway station in the municipality of Oensingen, in the Swiss canton of Solothurn. The station is a keilbahnhof. It is located at the junction of the standard gauge Jura Foot line of Swiss Federal Railways and Oensingen–Balsthal line of Oensingen-Balsthal-Bahn. It is also a terminus of the 1,000 mm (3 ft 3 3/8 in) gauge Langenthal–Oensingen line of Aare Seeland mobil.

== Services ==
As of the December 2025 timetable change, the following services stop at Oensingen:

- InterRegio: hourly service between Biel/Bienne and Zürich Hauptbahnhof.
- S11: half-hourly service between Solothurn and Langenthal.
- S20: half-hourly service between Olten and Solothurn, with trains continuing from Solothurn to Biel/Bienne, Langendorf, Lommiswil or Oberdorf SO.
- S22: half-hourly service to Balsthal.
