= OBB =

OBB may refer to:

- ÖBB, Austrian Federal Railways
- OBB (band), a Christian pop rock band
- Oliver B. Bumble, comic series and name of its main character
- Opaque binary blob, a file format, which is (among others) used by the Android operating system
- Open Buy Back, a security in the Nigerian financial markets
- Oriented bounding box, a type of bounding volume used in computer geometry
- OTC Bulletin Board, a regulated quotation service for stocks that are not listed on one of the major U.S. stock exchanges
- Opening Billboard or title sequence

== See also ==
- OeBB, Oensingen-Balsthal-Bahn, a railway line in Switzerland
