= Im Holz railway station =

Railway station in Lommiswil, Switzerland

Im Holz
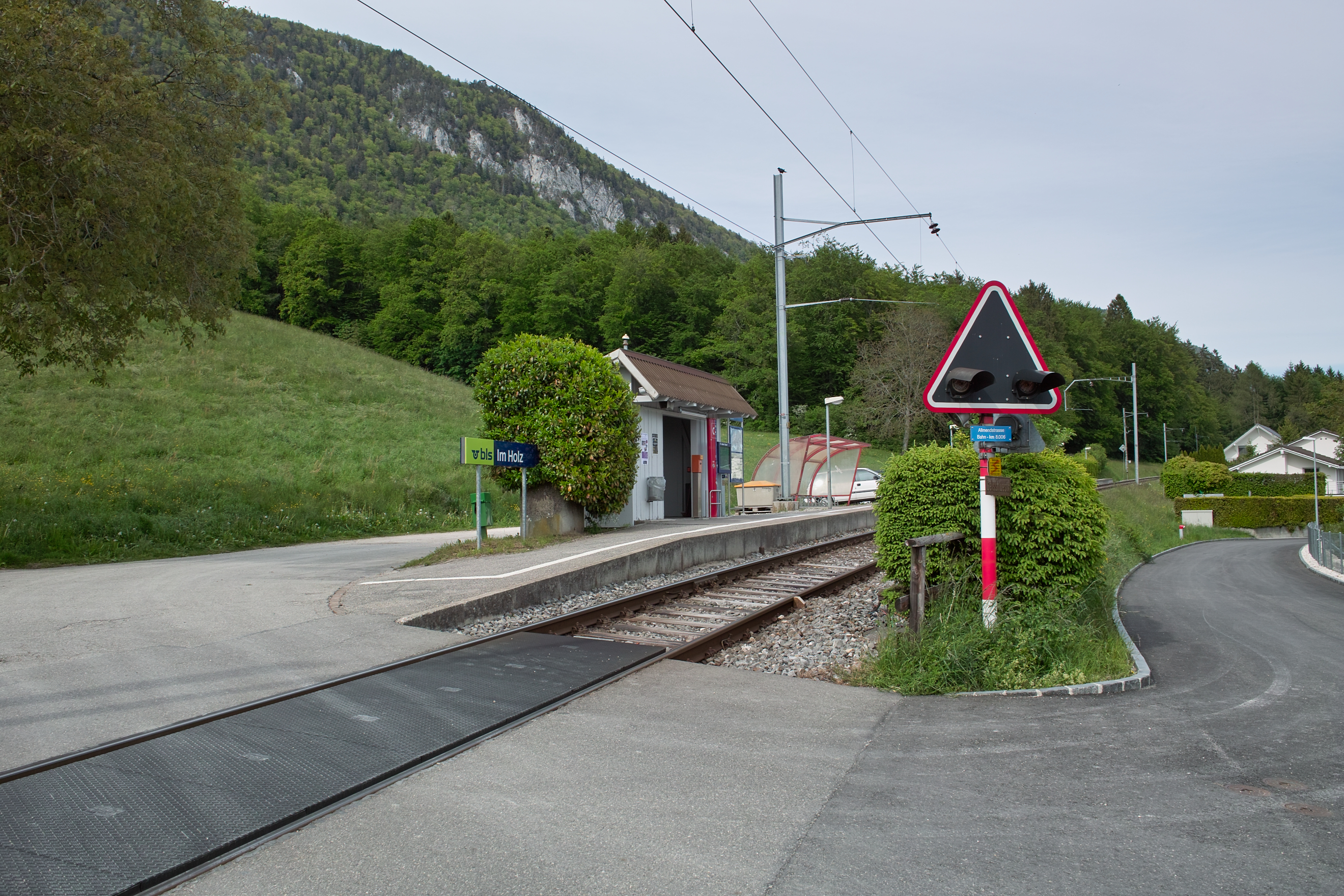
- The platform in 2012

General information
- Location: Lommiswil; Switzerland
- Coordinates: 47°13′52″N 7°28′30″E
- Elevation: 616 m (2,021 ft)
- Owner: BLS AG
- Line: Solothurn–Moutier line
- Distance: 8.0 km (5.0 mi) from Solothurn West
- Platforms: 1 side platform
- Tracks: 1
- Train operators: Swiss Federal Railways
- Connections: Busbetrieb Solothurn und Umgebung bus line

Construction
- Accessible: Yes

Other information
- Station code: 8500263 (IMHO)
- Fare zone: 201 (Libero)

Passengers
- 2023: 100 per weekday (SBB)

Services
Preceding station	SBB CFF FFS	Following station
Oberdorf SO Terminus	S21	Lommiswil towards Solothurn
Location

Im Holz railway station (German: Bahnhof Im Holz) is a railway station in the municipality of Lommiswil, in the Swiss canton of Solothurn. It is an intermediate stop on the standard gauge Solothurn–Moutier line of BLS AG and is served as a request stop by local trains only.

== History ==
Between Spring 2024 and March 2026, the Weissenstein Tunnel is getting a renovation and remains closed. The BLS is using the tunnel closure to renovate the whole of the line. This station will be modernized to permit barrier-free boarding. S21 trains terminate at Oberdorf SO and replacement buses are running between Gänsbrunnen and Moutier during the construction work.

== Services ==
As of the December 2024 timetable change, the following services stop at Im Holz:

- S21: hourly service between Oberdorf SO and Solothurn.
