= Solothurn West railway station =

Railway station in Solothurn, Switzerland

Solothurn West
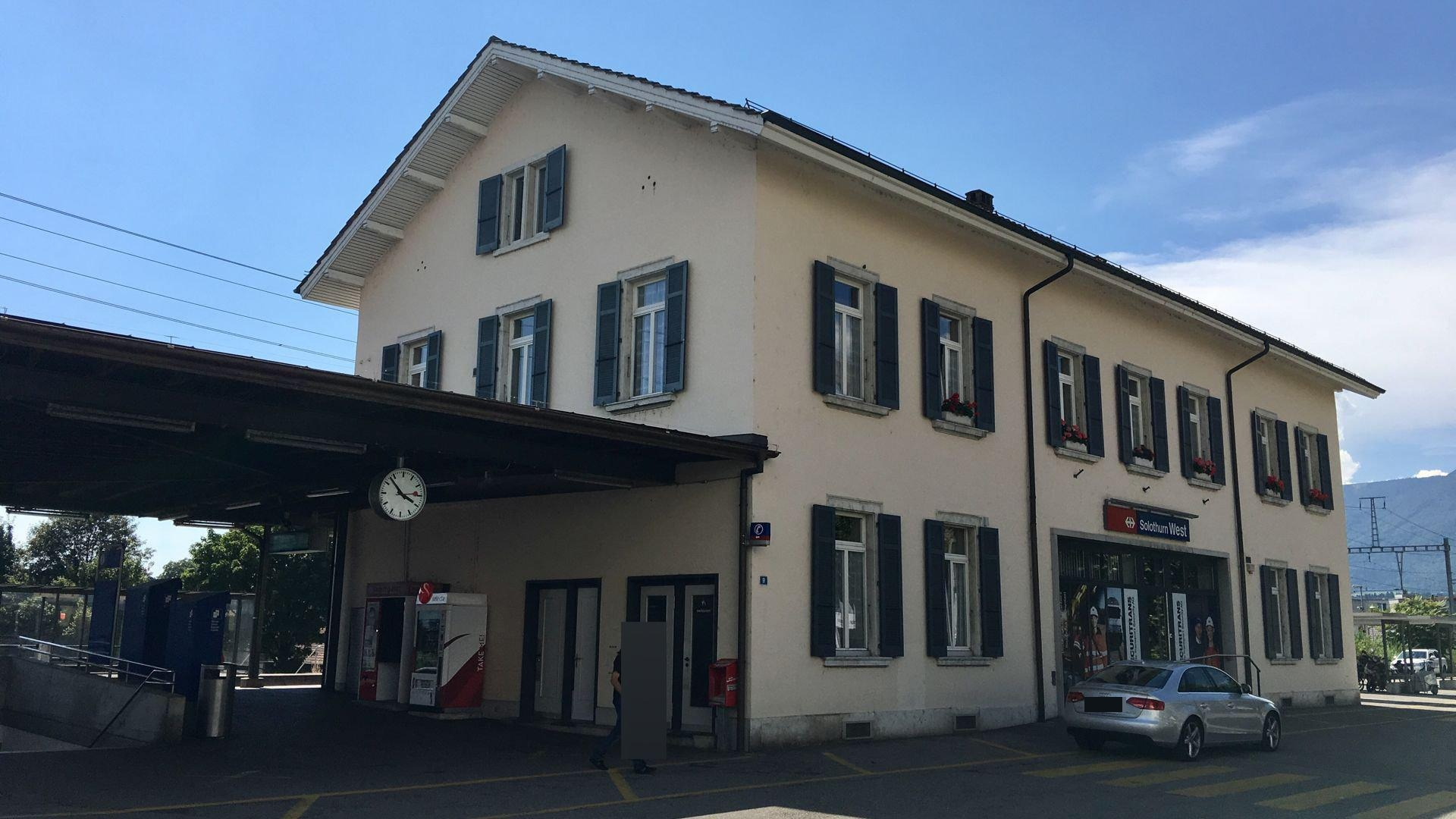
- The station building in 2018

General information
- Location: Westbahnhofstrasse, Solothurn; Solothurn; Switzerland
- Coordinates: 47°12′24″N 7°31′55″E
- Elevation: 433 m (1,421 ft)
- Owner: Swiss Federal Railways
- Lines: Jura Foot line; Solothurn–Moutier line
- Distance: 74.8 km (46.5 mi) from Basel SBB
- Platforms: 2 side platforms
- Tracks: 2
- Train operators: Swiss Federal Railways

Construction
- Parking: Yes (69 spaces)
- Cycle facilities: Yes (65 spaces)
- Accessible: No

Other information
- Station code: 8500206 (SW)
- Fare zone: 200 (Libero)

Passengers
- 2023: 1,700 per weekday (SBB)

Services
Preceding station	SBB CFF FFS	Following station
Langendorf towards Oberdorf SO	S20	Solothurn towards Olten
Solothurn Allmend towards Biel/Bienne	S20	Solothurn towards Olten
Langendorf towards Oberdorf SO	S21	Solothurn Terminus
Location

Solothurn West railway station (German: Bahnhof Solothurn West) is a railway station in the municipality of Solothurn, in the Swiss canton of Solothurn. It is an intermediate stop on the standard gauge Jura Foot and Solothurn–Moutier lines and is served by local trains only.

The station was the first station in Solothurn. When the current Solothurn railway station was built, it was named Alt-Solothurn (as opposed to the new Neu-Solothurn). Later it became Solothurn West. It is located on Westbahnhofstrasse.

== Services ==
As of the December 2024 timetable change, the following services stop at Solothurn West:

- S20: half-hourly service between Biel/Bienne and Solothurn, with every other train continuing from Solothurn to Olten; limited service to Langendorf, Lommiswil or Oberdorf SO.
- S21: hourly service between Oberdorf SO and Solothurn.

== Images ==
Time series of station building, track-side

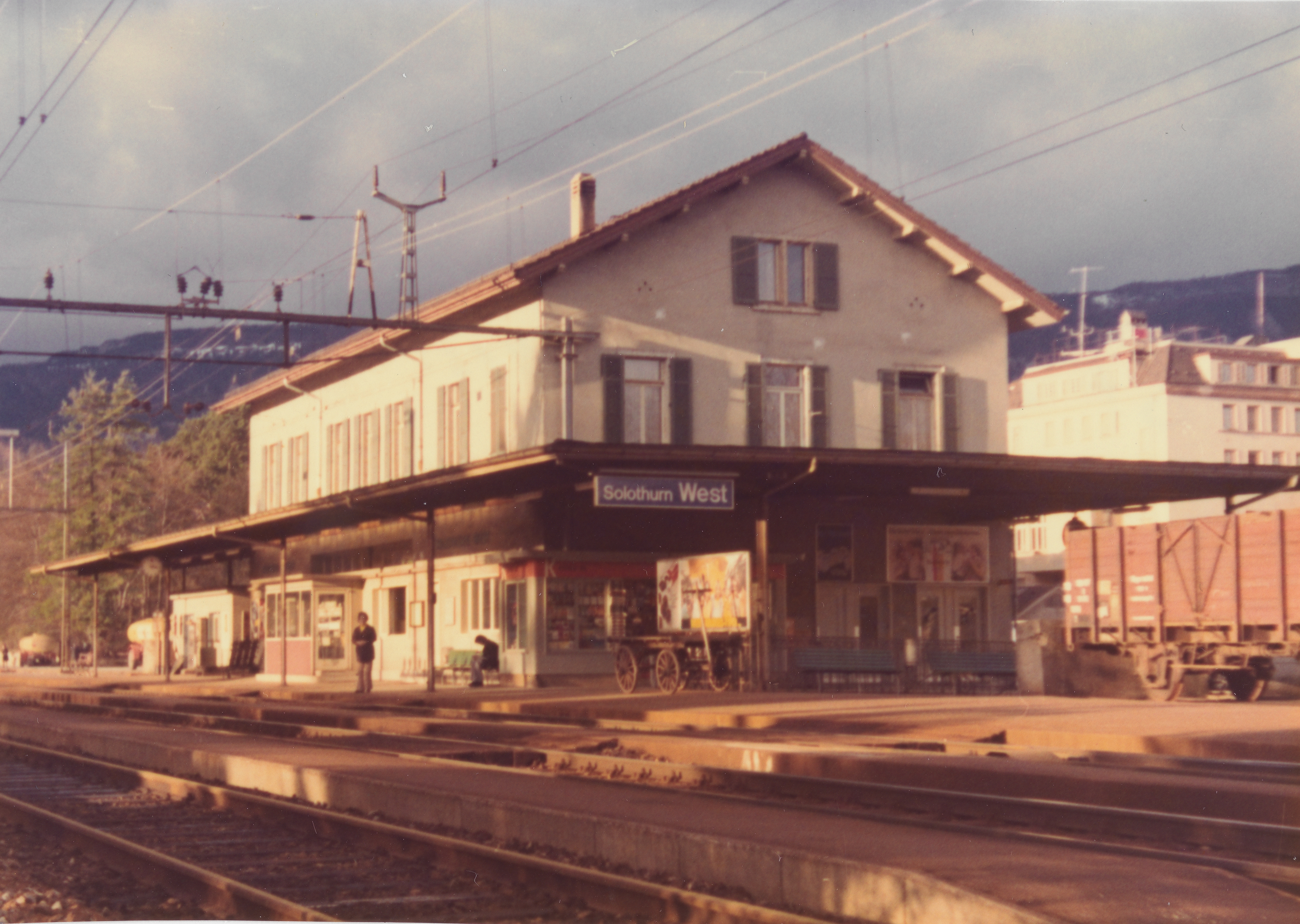
1974

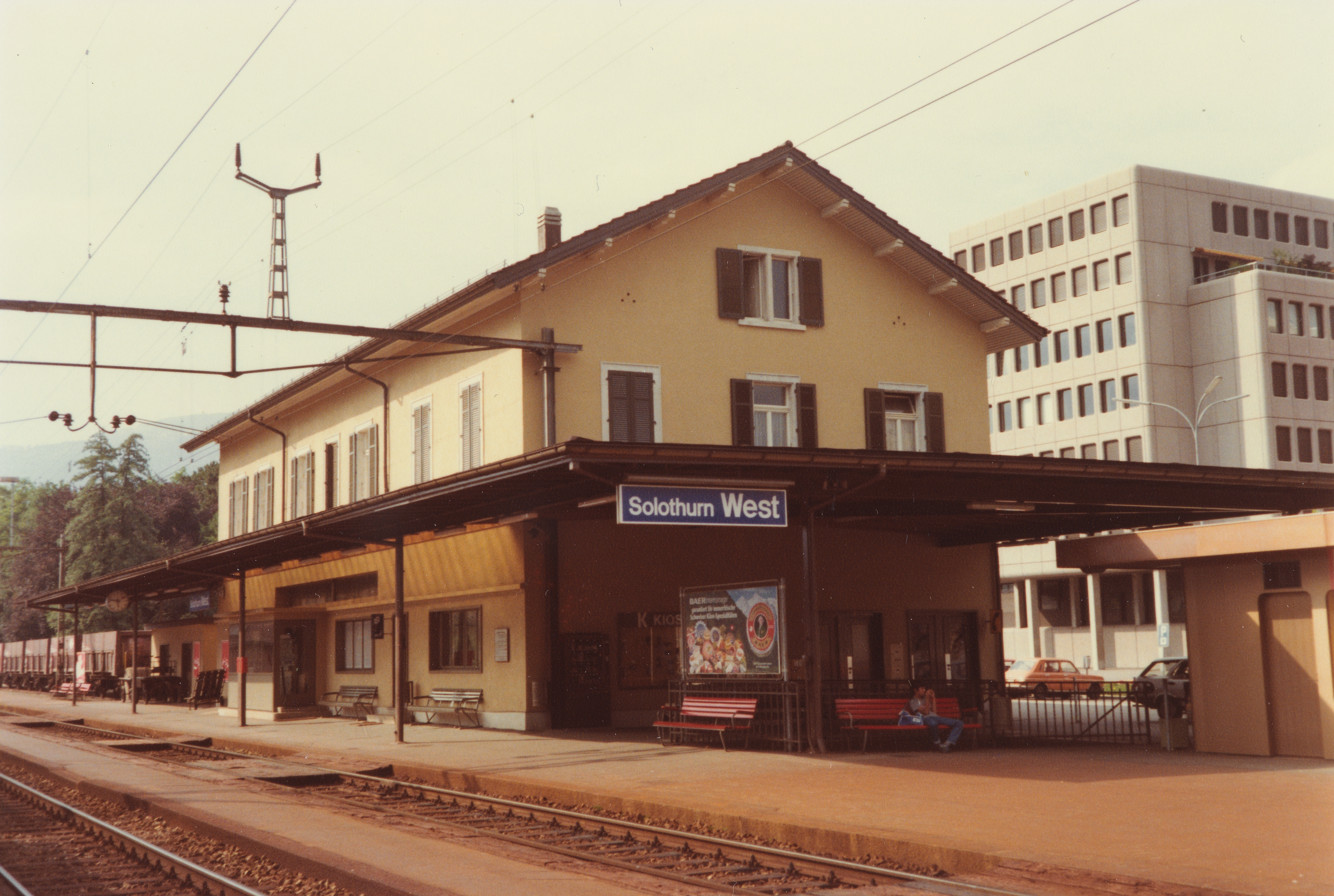
1982

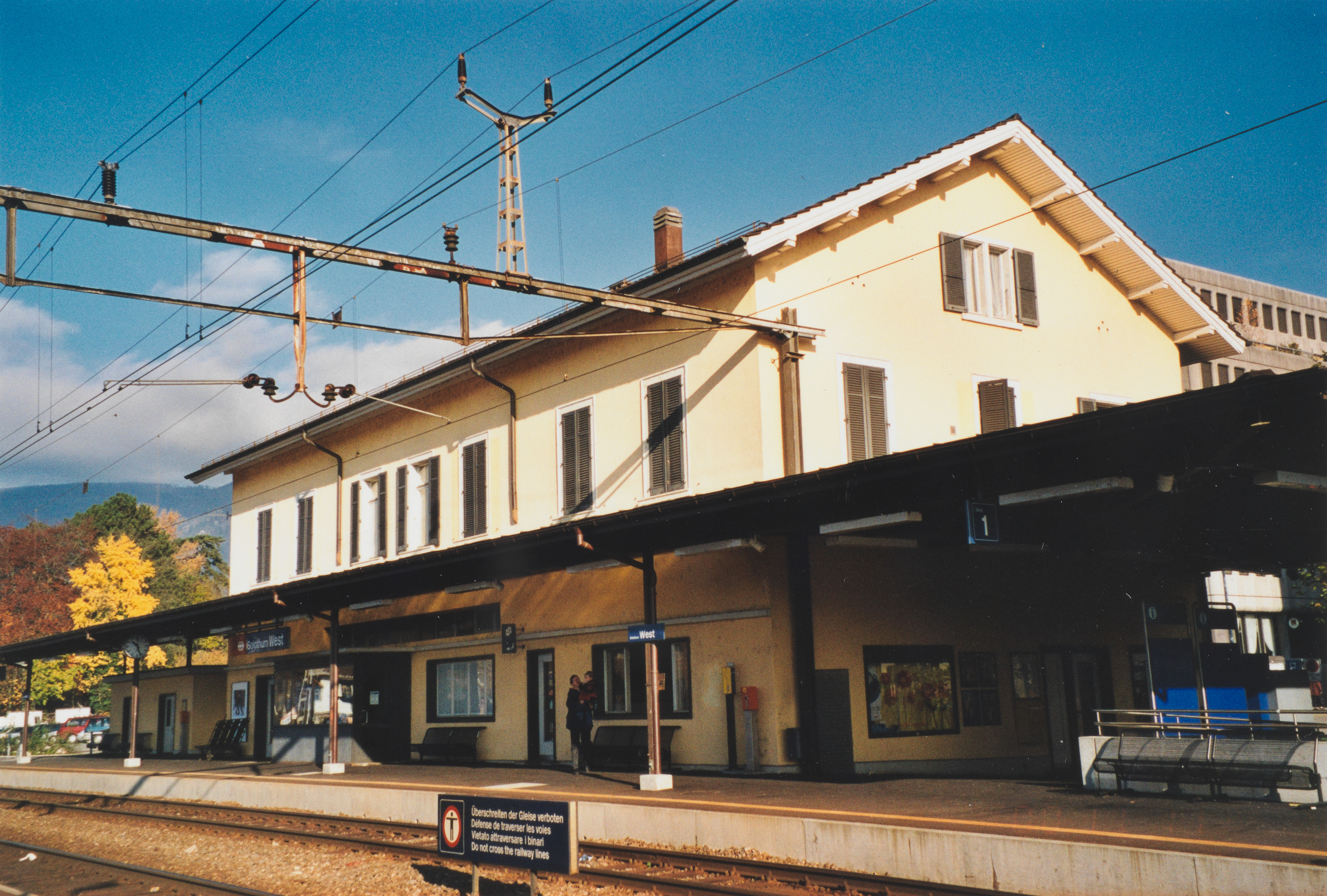
2000

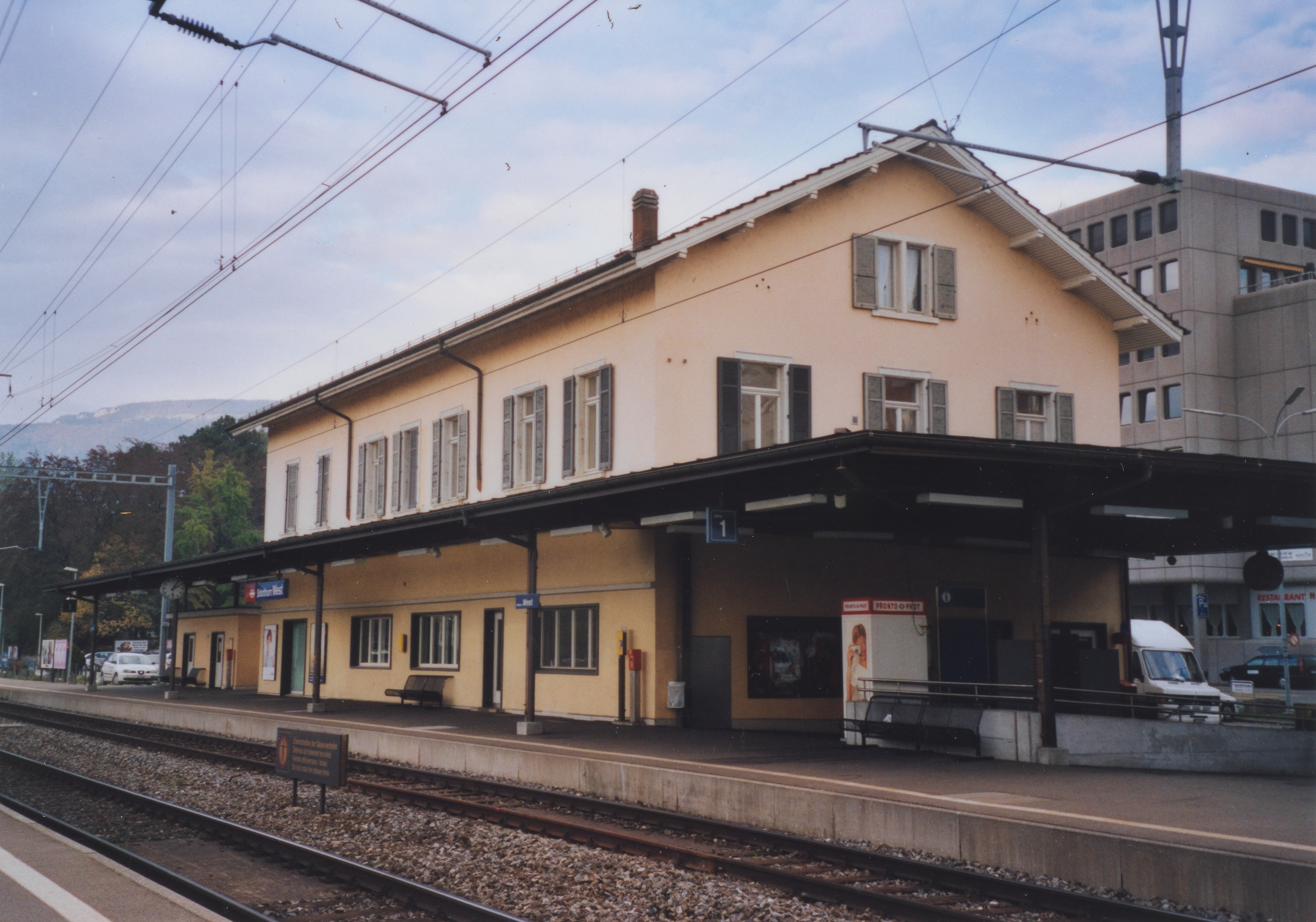
2006
