= Oensingen–Balsthal railway line =

Railway line in Switzerland

Oensingen–Balsthal
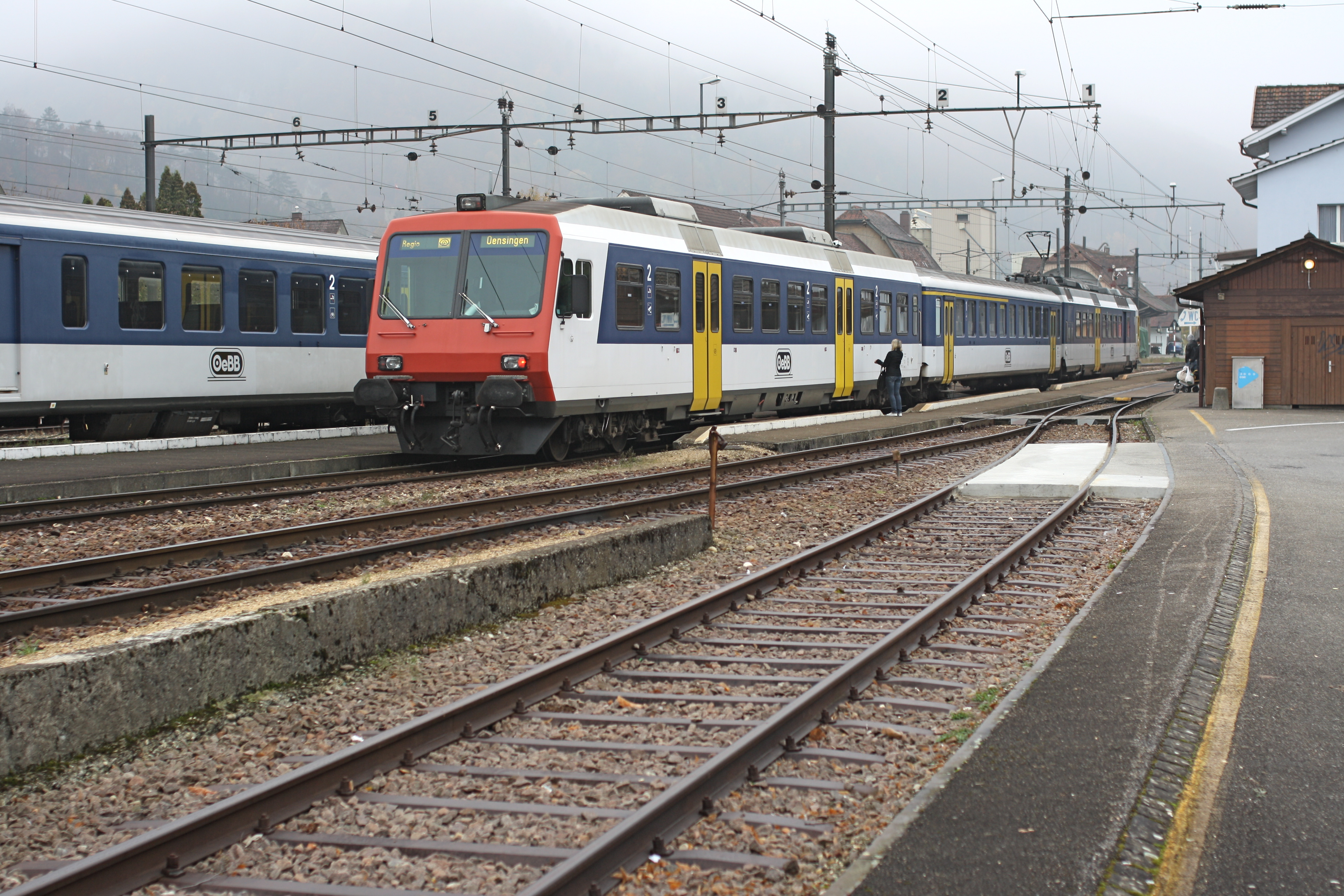
- Train at Balsthal in 2009

Overview
- Owner: Oensingen-Balsthal-Bahn
- Line number: 412
- Termini: Oensingen; Balsthal
- Stations: 4

History
- Opened: 17 July 1899
- Electrification: 4 October 1943

Technical
- Line length: 4.1 km (2.5 mi)
- Track gauge: 1,435 mm (4 ft 8 1/2 in) standard gauge
- Electrification: 15 kV 16.7 Hz AC overhead catenary

The Oensingen–Balsthal railway line is a standard gauge railway line in the canton of Solothurn in Switzerland. It runs 4.1 kilometres (2.5 mi) from a junction with the Jura Foot Line at Oensingen to Balsthal. The Oensingen-Balsthal-Bahn owns the line; Swiss Federal Railways operates scheduled passenger services.

== History ==
The Oensingen-Balsthal-Bahn opened the line between Oensingen and Balsthal on 17 July 1899. The line was electrified at 15 kV 16.7 Hz AC in 1943.

== Operation ==
Swiss Federal Railways operates the S22 on a half-hourly interval between Oensingen and Balsthal, with connections available at Oensingen to Olten, Biel/Bienne, and Zürich Hauptbahnhof. Major freight customers on the line include Swiss Quality Paper, KEBAG AG, and Von Roll.
