= Tecknau railway station =

Railway station in Switzerland

Tecknau
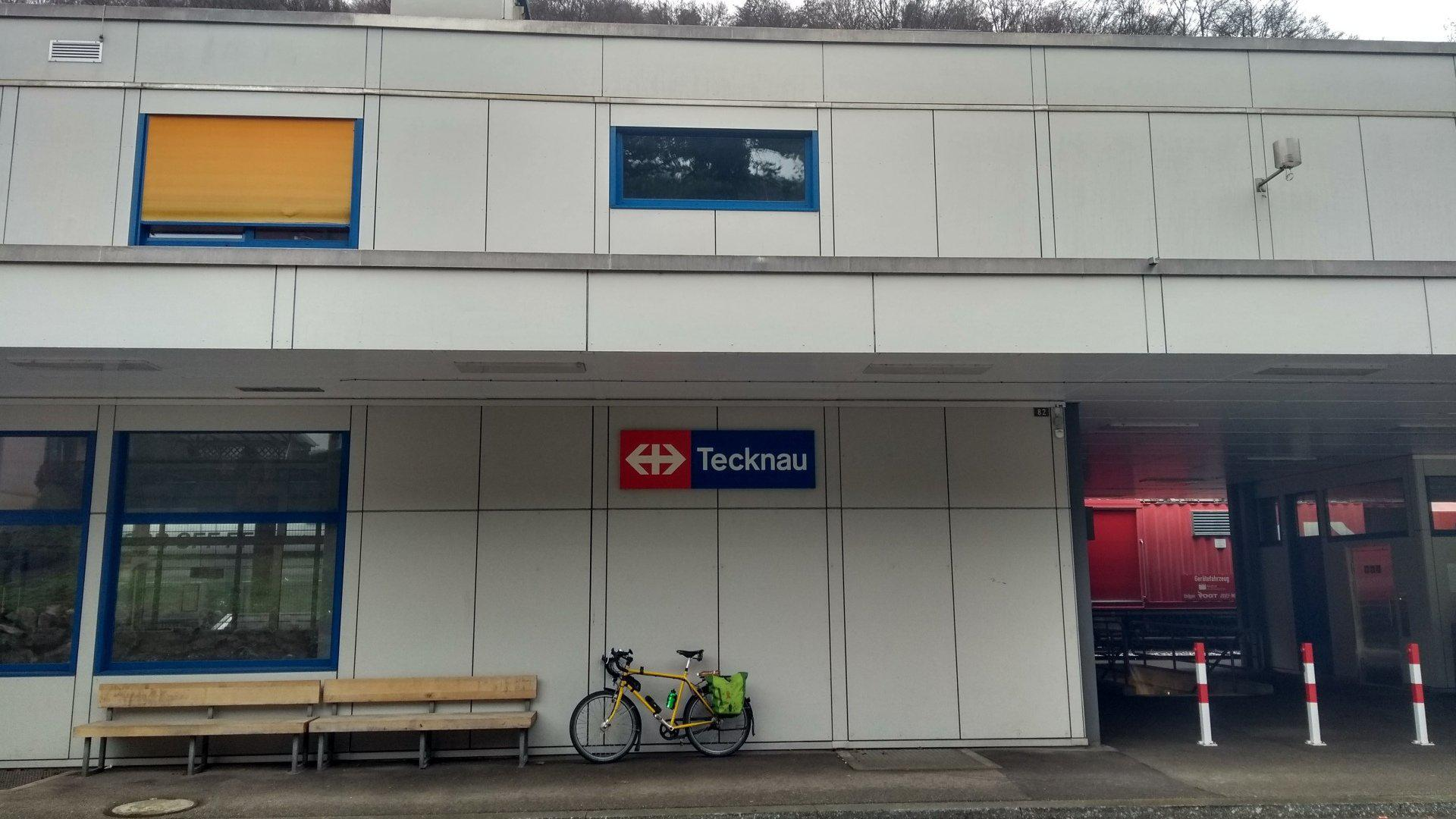
- The station in 2018

General information
- Location: Tecknau; Switzerland
- Coordinates: 47°26′45″N 7°53′15″E
- Elevation: 445 m (1,460 ft)
- Owner: Swiss Federal Railways
- Line: Hauenstein line
- Distance: 28.2 km (17.5 mi) from Basel SBB
- Train operators: Swiss Federal Railways
- Connections: Baselland Transport bus lines

Other information
- Fare zone: 34 (tnw)

Passengers
- 2018: 520 per weekday

Services
Preceding station	Basel S-Bahn	Following station
Gelterkinden towards Delémont	S3	Olten Terminus
Location

Tecknau railway station (German: Bahnhof Tecknau) is a railway station in the municipality of Tecknau, in the Swiss canton of Basel-Landschaft. It is an intermediate stop on the base tunnel branch of the standard gauge Hauenstein line of Swiss Federal Railways. It is the first stop north of the Hauenstein base tunnel.

== Services ==
As of the December 2025 timetable change, the following services stop at Tecknau:

- Basel trinational S-Bahn: half-hourly service between Laufen and Olten; and two trains per day to Delémont.
