= Tecknau =

- Municipality
- Coat of arms
- Location of Tecknau
- Location within Switzerland Location within Canton of Basel-Landschaft
- Coordinates: 47°27′N 7°53′E
- Country: Switzerland
- Canton: Basel-Landschaft
- District: Sissach

Area
  - Total: 2.35 km^{2} (0.91 sq mi)
- Elevation: 438 m (1,437 ft)

Population (June 2021)
  - Total: 822
  - Density: 350/km^{2} (906/sq mi)
- Time zone: UTC+01:00 (CET)
  - Summer (DST): UTC+02:00 (CEST)
- Postal code: 4492
- SFOS number: 2862
- ISO 3166 code: CH-BL
- Surrounded by: Gelterkinden, Kilchberg, Ormalingen, Rünenberg, Wenslingen
- Website: www.tecknau.ch

Tecknau is a municipality in the district of Sissach in the canton of Basel-Country in Switzerland.

== Geography ==
Tecknau has an area, as of 2009, of 2.35 square kilometers (0.91 sq mi). Of this area, 0.58 km^{2} (0.22 sq mi) or 24.7% is used for agricultural purposes, while 1.38 km^{2} (0.53 sq mi) or 58.7% is forested. Of the rest of the land, 0.39 km^{2} (0.15 sq mi) or 16.6% is settled (buildings or roads), 0.03 km^{2} (7.4 acres) or 1.3% is either rivers or lakes.

Of the built up area, industrial buildings made up 1.7% of the total area while housing and buildings made up 7.2% and transportation infrastructure made up 6.8%. Out of the forested land, all of the forested land area is covered with heavy forests. Of the agricultural land, 4.3% is used for growing crops and 19.6% is pastures. All the water in the municipality is flowing water.

== Coat of arms ==
The blazon of the municipal coat of arms is Vert, a Pale wavy Argent.

== Demographics ==
Tecknau has a population (as of June 2021) of 822. As of 2008, 28.8% of the population are resident foreign nationals. Over the last 10 years (1997–2007) the population has changed at a rate of -4.6%.

Most of the population (as of 2000) speaks German (726 or 85.4%), with Albanian being second most common (46 or 5.4%) and Turkish being third (24 or 2.8%). There are 3 people who speak French and 1 person who speaks Romansh.

As of 2008, the gender distribution of the population was 50.4% male and 49.6% female. The population was made up of 581 Swiss citizens (69.8% of the population), and 251 non-Swiss residents (30.2%) Of the population in the municipality 189 or about 22.2% were born in Tecknau and lived there in 2000. There were 231 or 27.2% who were born in the same canton, while 207 or 24.4% were born somewhere else in Switzerland, and 212 or 24.9% were born outside of Switzerland.

In 2008 there were 7 live births to Swiss citizens and 4 births to non-Swiss citizens, and in same time span there were 2 deaths of Swiss citizens. Ignoring immigration and emigration, the population of Swiss citizens increased by 5 while the foreign population increased by 4. There was 1 Swiss woman who immigrated back to Switzerland. At the same time, there were 3 non-Swiss men and 3 non-Swiss women who immigrated from another country to Switzerland. The total Swiss population change in 2008 (from all sources, including moves across municipal borders) was an increase of 14 and the non-Swiss population increased by 2 people. This represents a population growth rate of 2.0%.

The age distribution, as of 2010, in Tecknau is; 62 children or 7.5% of the population are between 0 and 6 years old and 146 teenagers or 17.5% are between 7 and 19. Of the adult population, 107 people or 12.9% of the population are between 20 and 29 years old. 95 people or 11.4% are between 30 and 39, 157 people or 18.9% are between 40 and 49, and 144 people or 17.3% are between 50 and 64. The senior population distribution is 102 people or 12.3% of the population are between 65 and 79 years old and there are 19 people or 2.3% who are over 80.

As of 2000, there were 353 people who were single and never married in the municipality. There were 431 married individuals, 31 widows or widowers and 35 individuals who are divorced.

As of 2000, there were 321 private households in the municipality, and an average of 2.6 persons per household. There were 73 households that consist of only one person and 33 households with five or more people. Out of a total of 325 households that answered this question, 22.5% were households made up of just one person and 1 were adults who lived with their parents. Of the rest of the households, there are 100 married couples without children, 118 married couples with children There were 23 single parents with a child or children. There were 6 households that were made up unrelated people and 4 households that were made some sort of institution or another collective housing.

In 2000 there were 131 single family homes (or 66.8% of the total) out of a total of 196 inhabited buildings. There were 39 multi-family buildings (19.9%), along with 17 multi-purpose buildings that were mostly used for housing (8.7%) and 9 other use buildings (commercial or industrial) that also had some housing (4.6%). Of the single family homes 7 were built before 1919, while 51 were built between 1990 and 2000.

In 2000 there were 333 apartments in the municipality. The most common apartment size was 4 rooms of which there were 115. There were 4 single room apartments and 114 apartments with five or more rooms. Of these apartments, a total of 313 apartments (94.0% of the total) were permanently occupied, while 5 apartments (1.5%) were seasonally occupied and 15 apartments (4.5%) were empty. As of 2009, the construction rate of new housing units was 1.2 new units per 1000 residents. As of 2000 the average price to rent a two-room apartment was about .00 CHF (US$0, £0, €0), a three-room apartment was about 827.00 CHF (US$660, £370, €530) and a four-room apartment cost an average of 1096.00 CHF (US$880, £490, €700). The vacancy rate for the municipality, in 2010, was 0%.

The historical population is given in the following chart:

== Politics ==
In the 2007 federal election the most popular party was the SVP which received 41.94% of the vote. The next three most popular parties were the SP (20.63%), the Green Party (16.05%) and the FDP (13.59%). In the federal election, a total of 214 votes were cast, and the voter turnout was 45.3%.

== Economy ==
As of 2010, Tecknau had an unemployment rate of 4.4%. As of 2008, there were 11 people employed in the primary economic sector and about 5 businesses involved in this sector. 46 people were employed in the secondary sector and there were 4 businesses in this sector. 63 people were employed in the tertiary sector, with 21 businesses in this sector. There were 457 residents of the municipality who were employed in some capacity, of which females made up 41.6% of the workforce.

In 2008 the total number of full-time equivalent jobs was 93. The number of jobs in the primary sector was 7, of which 6 were in agriculture and 1 was in forestry or lumber production. The number of jobs in the secondary sector was 40, of which 9 or (22.5%) were in manufacturing and 31 (77.5%) were in construction. The number of jobs in the tertiary sector was 46. In the tertiary sector; 8 or 17.4% were in wholesale or retail sales or the repair of motor vehicles, 2 or 4.3% were in the movement and storage of goods, 5 or 10.9% were in a hotel or restaurant, 3 or 6.5% were in the information industry, 3 or 6.5% were technical professionals or scientists, 7 or 15.2% were in education and 2 or 4.3% were in health care.

In 2000, there were 42 workers who commuted into the municipality and 388 workers who commuted away. The municipality is a net exporter of workers, with about 9.2 workers leaving the municipality for every one entering. Of the working population, 31.1% used public transportation to get to work, and 56.7% used a private car.

== Religion ==
From the 2000 census, 157 or 18.5% were Roman Catholic, while 415 or 48.8% belonged to the Swiss Reformed Church. Of the rest of the population, there were 15 members of an Orthodox church (or about 1.76% of the population), there were 2 individuals (or about 0.24% of the population) who belonged to the Christian Catholic Church, and there were 19 individuals (or about 2.24% of the population) who belonged to another Christian church. There were 130 (or about 15.29% of the population) who were Islamic. 81 (or about 9.53% of the population) belonged to no church, are agnostic or atheist, and 31 individuals (or about 3.65% of the population) did not answer the question.

== Transport ==
Tecknau sits on the Hauenstein line and is served by trains at Tecknau railway station.

== Education ==
In Tecknau about 321 or (37.8%) of the population have completed non-mandatory upper secondary education, and 57 or (6.7%) have completed additional higher education (either university or a Fachhochschule). Of the 57 who completed tertiary schooling, 63.2% were Swiss men, 21.1% were Swiss women, 10.5% were non-Swiss men.

As of 2000, there were 67 students from Tecknau who attended schools outside the municipality.
