= Aarburg-Oftringen railway station =

Railway station in Aargau, Switzerland

Aarburg-Oftringen
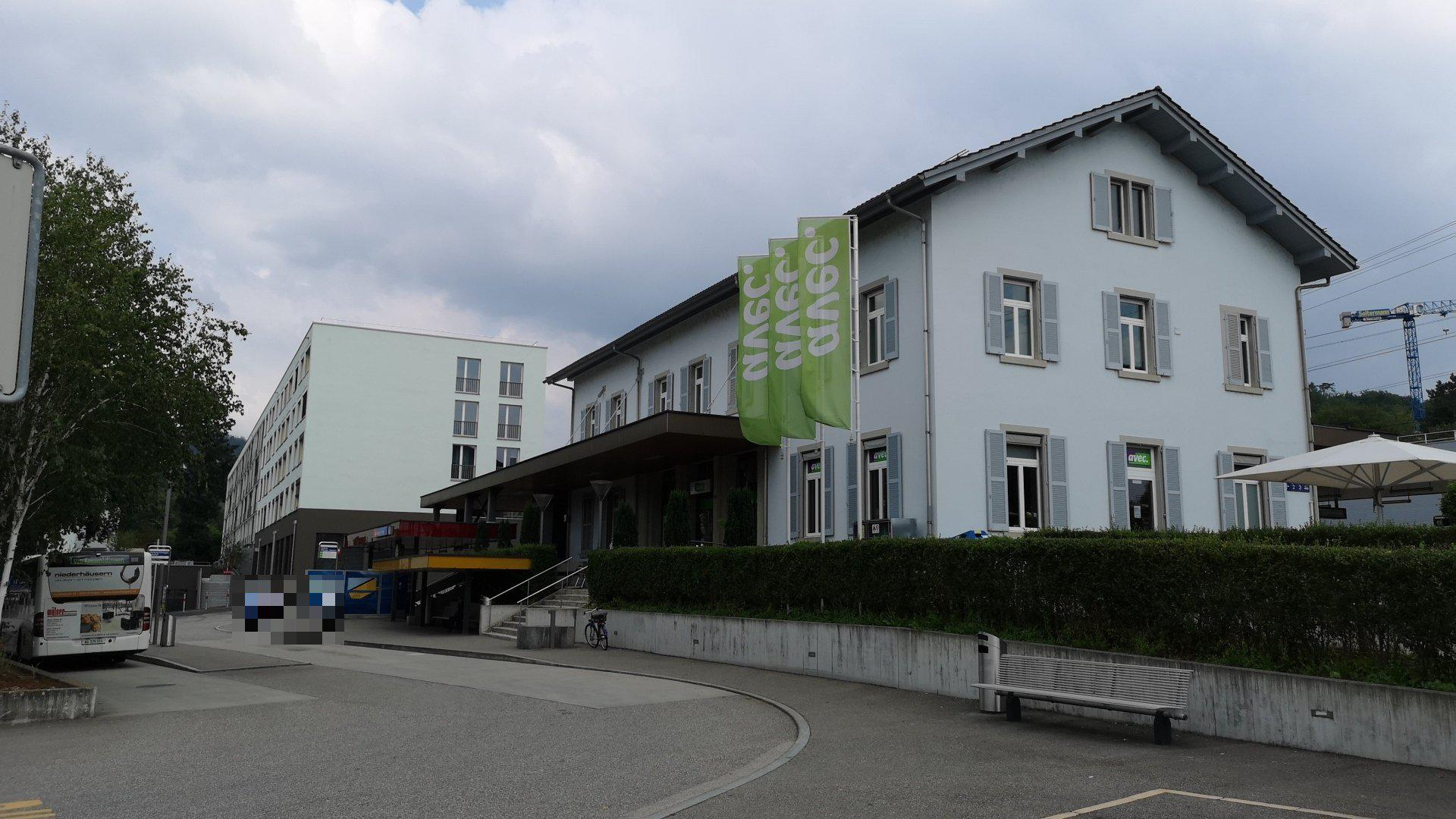
- The station building in 2018

General information
- Location: Aarburg; Switzerland
- Coordinates: 47°19′13″N 7°54′29″E
- Owner: Swiss Federal Railways
- Lines: Olten–Bern line; Olten–Lucerne line
- Distance: 43.0 km (26.7 mi) from Basel SBB
- Train operators: Swiss Federal Railways
- Connections: Aargau Verkehr and Busbetrieb Olten Gösgen Gäu buses

Other information
- Fare zone: 520 and 521 (A-Welle)

Passengers
- 2018: 3,000 per weekday

Services
Preceding station	SBB CFF FFS	Following station
Olten Terminus	RE24	Zofingen towards Lucerne
Preceding station	Aargau S-Bahn	Following station
Olten towards Baden	S23	Rothrist towards Langenthal
Olten towards Turgi	S29	Zofingen towards Sursee
Location
- Location within Switzerland Location within Canton of Aargau

Aarburg-Oftringen railway station (German: Bahnhof Aarburg-Oftringen) is a railway station in the municipality of Aarburg, in the Swiss canton of Aargau. It is located at the junction of the standard gauge Olten–Bern and Olten–Lucerne lines of Swiss Federal Railways.

== Services ==
The following services stop at Aarburg-Oftringen:

- RegioExpress: hourly service between Olten and Lucerne.
- Aargau S-Bahn:
  - S23: hourly service between Langenthal and Baden, increasing to half-hourly between Langenthal and Olten on weekdays.
  - S29: hourly service between Sursee and Turgi.
