= Open Buy Back =

Open Buy Back (OBB), are discountable securities traded in the Nigerian Inter-Bank financial market. An Open Buy Back is a money market instrument used to raise short term capital. It is a form of borrowing using Nigerian Government Securities as collateral. It is an open ended transaction with both parties maintaining the right of liquidation or a roll-over without prior notice within trading hours of the day.

An OBB transaction is usually sealed between dealers of different banks and settlement is made at Central Bank where bills are transferred from the borrower's bills holding to the lenders bills portfolio. On the other hand, funds equivalent to the face value of the treasury bills is moved from the account of the lender to the borrower's current account with the Central Bank of Nigeria.

This product offers flexibility, but with interest rate and bank stability risk. It is a product for short-term liquidity. OBB offers the benefits of Treasury bills (counts as liquid asset) while removing the rediscounting risk associated with carrying Treasury Bills.

A casual look at OBB might liken it to a Repo. Though OBB and Repo/Reverse Repo involve the exchange of cash for security with an agreement to buy back, a Repo has a predetermined repurchase date while an OBB is an open ended transaction and securities traded might never be repurchased before maturity.

Also, a Repo can be transacted with different kinds of securities but OBB is strictly limited to Nigerian Government issued securities.

Open Buy Back is only used in the Nigerian financial markets. As a result, companies selling financial software, such as IFlex and Infosys, have made considerable modifications to their applications to accommodate this unique security.

== Volatility ==
During the week of March 6, 2006, interest rates for Nigerian open buy backs crashed from 8.25% to 3.85%.
