= Solothurn railway station =

Railway station in Solothurn, Switzerland

Solothurn
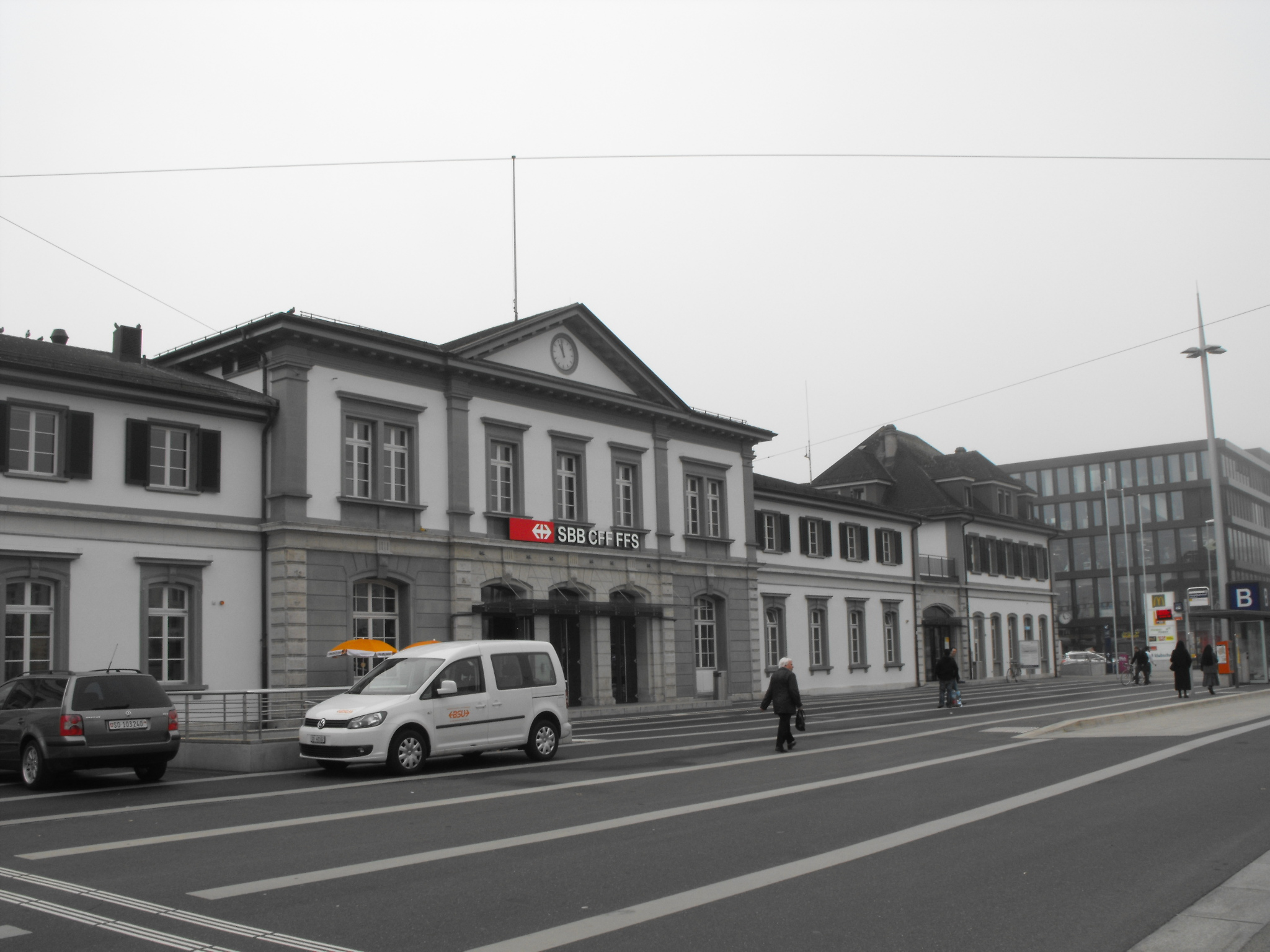
- The station building in 2012

General information
- Location: Dornacherstrasse 50; Solothurn; Switzerland
- Coordinates: 47°12′15″N 7°32′34″E
- Elevation: 432 m (1,417 ft)
- Owner: Swiss Federal Railways
- Lines: Jura Foot line; Solothurn–Langnau line; Solothurn–Moutier line; Solothurn–Niederbipp line; Solothurn–Wanzwil line; Solothurn–Worblaufen line
- Distance: 73.6–80.3 kilometres (45.7–49.9 mi) from Basel SBB
- Platforms: 8: 2 side platforms; 3 island platforms
- Tracks: 9
- Train operators: Aare Seeland mobil (asm); BLS AG; Regionalverkehr Bern-Solothurn (RBS); Swiss Federal Railways (SBB)
- Connections: Autobusbetrieb RBS bus line; PostAuto AG bus line; Busbetrieb Solothurn und Umgebung buses

Construction
- Parking: Yes (193 spaces)
- Cycle facilities: Yes (521 spaces)
- Accessible: Yes

Other information
- Station code: 8500207 (SO)
- Fare zone: 200 (Libero)

History
- Opened: 4 December 1876
- Former names: Neu-Solothurn, Solothurn-Hauptbahnhof

Passengers
- 2025: 15,600 per day (BLS, SBB (excluding ASM and RBS))
- Rank: 55 out of 1,095 (Note: Tied with Bülach railway station.)

Services
Preceding station	SBB CFF FFS	Following station
Grenchen Süd towards Lausanne	IC 5	Olten towards Zürich HB, St. Gallen or Rorschach
Grenchen Süd towards Biel/Bienne	IR 55	Oensingen towards Zürich HB
Solothurn West towards Biel/Bienne or Oberdorf SO	S20	Luterbach-Attisholz towards Olten
Solothurn West towards Oberdorf SO	S21	Terminus
Preceding station	Bern S-Bahn	Following station
Biberist Ost towards Thun	S41	Terminus
Biberist Ost towards Thun	S44	Terminus
Gerlafingen towards Ostermundigen	S46 Rush-hour service	Terminus
Preceding station	Aare Seeland mobil	Following station
Solothurn Baseltor towards Langenthal	S11	Terminus
Preceding station	Regionalverkehr Bern-Solothurn	Following station
Biberist RBS towards Bern	RE5	Terminus
Location
- Location within Switzerland Location within Canton of Solothurn

Solothurn railway station (Alemannic German: Bahnhof Solothurn) serves the municipality of Solothurn, the capital city of the Canton of Solothurn, Switzerland. Solothurn is a major railway junction and is served by six railway lines.

== Layout ==
Solothurn serves four operators from three different areas. The main part of the station has one side and two island platforms, serving tracks 1–3 and 5–6. These are used by BLS and Swiss Federal Railways trains. On the south side of the station, another island platform serves tracks 9–10, used by Regionalverkehr Bern-Solothurn (RBS). Finally, the narrow-gauge trains of Aare Seeland mobil (asm) stop on Luzernstrasse, on the north side of the station. This is designated track 21.

== Services ==
As of the December 2025 timetable change, the following services stop at Solothurn:

- InterCity / InterRegio: half-hourly service between Biel/Bienne and Zürich Hauptbahnhof and hourly service to Lausanne and Rorschach
- RegioExpress: service every fifteen minutes on weekdays to Bern or half-hourly service on weekends.
- Bern S-Bahn:
  - S41/S44: half-hourly service to Thun.
  - S46: morning rush-hour service on weekdays to Ostermundigen.
- S11: half-hourly service to Langenthal.
- S20: half-hourly service to Olten and to Biel/Bienne; limited service to Langendorf, Lommiswil or Oberdorf SO.
- S21: hourly service to Oberdorf SO.

== See also ==
- Rail transport in Switzerland
