= Lommiswil railway station =

Railway station in Lommiswil, Switzerland

Lommiswil
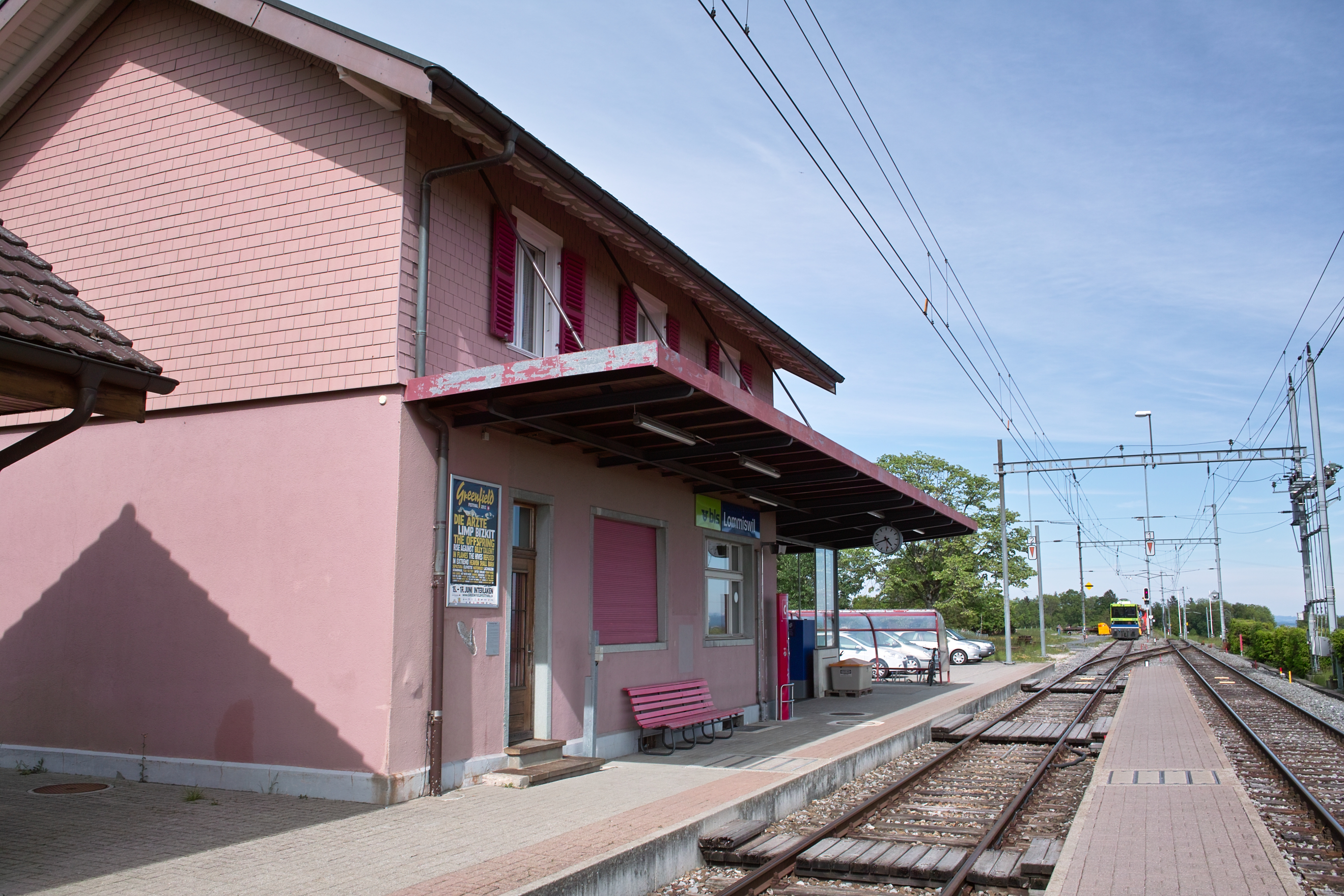
- The station building in 2012

General information
- Location: Lommiswil; Switzerland
- Coordinates: 47°13′08″N 7°28′08″E
- Elevation: 555 m (1,821 ft)
- Owner: BLS AG
- Line: Solothurn–Moutier line
- Distance: 5.3 km (3.3 mi) from Solothurn West
- Platforms: 2
- Tracks: 2
- Train operators: Swiss Federal Railways
- Connections: BGU bus line

Construction
- Parking: Yes (13 spaces)
- Accessible: No

Other information
- Station code: 8500262 (LOM)
- Fare zone: 201 (Libero)

Passengers
- 2023: 130 per weekday (SBB)

Services
Preceding station	SBB CFF FFS	Following station
Terminus	S20 Except Sundays	Langendorf towards Olten
Im Holz towards Oberdorf SO	S21	Langendorf towards Solothurn
Location

Lommiswil railway station (German: Bahnhof Lommiswil) is a railway station in the municipality of Lommiswil, in the Swiss canton of Solothurn. It is an intermediate stop on the standard gauge Solothurn–Moutier line of BLS AG and is served by local trains only.

== History ==
Between Spring 2024 and March 2026, the Weissenstein Tunnel is getting a renovation and remains closed. The BLS is using the tunnel closure to renovate the whole of the line. This station will be modernized to permit barrier-free boarding and will have a new technical building and a transshipment point for maintenance work. S21 trains terminate at Oberdorf SO and replacement buses are running between Gänsbrunnen and Moutier during the construction work.

== Services ==
As of the December 2024 timetable change, the following services stop at Lommiswil:

- S20: three trains per day (except Sundays) to Olten.
- S21: hourly service between Oberdorf SO and Solothurn.
