= Olten railway station =

Railway station in Switzerland

Olten
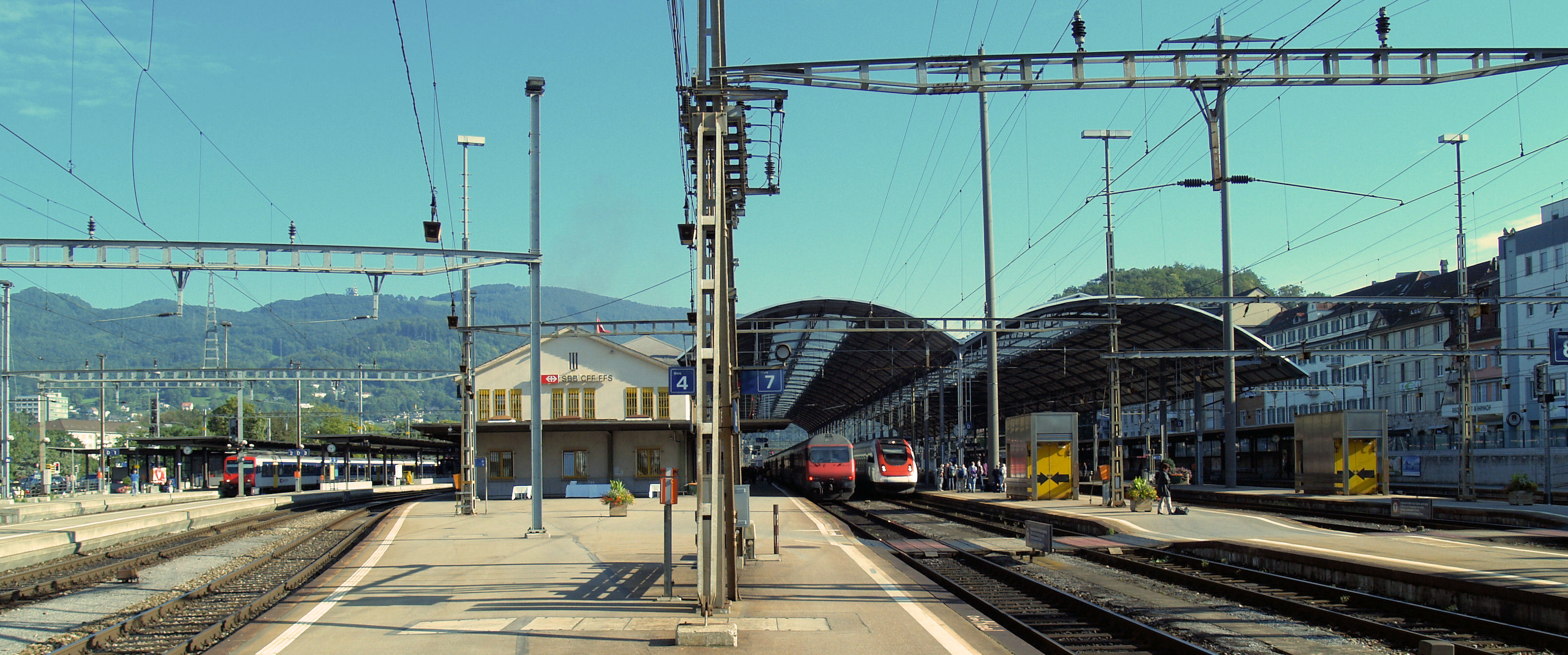
- The station in 2006

General information
- Location: Bahnhofstrasse 22; Olten; Switzerland
- Coordinates: 47°21′07″N 7°54′28″E
- Elevation: 396 m (1,299 ft)
- Owner: Swiss Federal Railways
- Lines: Hauenstein line; Jura Foot line; Olten–Aarau line; Olten–Bern line; Olten–Lucerne line
- Distance: 39.2 km (24.4 mi) from Basel SBB
- Platforms: 6
- Tracks: 10
- Train operators: BLS AG; Südostbahn; Swiss Federal Railways
- Connections: BOGG and PostAuto buses

Other information
- Fare zone: 520 (Tarifverbund A-Welle)

History
- Opened: 9 June 1856

Passengers
- 2025: 81,600 per day (BLS, SBB, SOB)
- Rank: 9 out of 1,095
Services
Preceding station	SBB CFF FFS	Following station
Basel SBB Terminus	EuroCity	Bern towards Milano Centrale
Basel SBB towards Frankfurt (Main) Hbf	EuroCity	Lucerne towards Milano Centrale
Liestal towards Hamburg-Altona	EuroCity	Bern towards Interlaken Ost
Solothurn towards Lausanne	IC 5	Aarau towards Zürich HB, St. Gallen or Rorschach
Oensingen towards Biel/Bienne	IR 55	Zürich HB Terminus
Basel SBB Terminus	IC 21	Lucerne towards Lugano
Liestal towards Basel SBB	IC 61	Bern towards Interlaken Ost
Liestal towards Basel SBB	IC 6	Bern towards Brig
Bern Terminus	IR 16	Aarau towards Zürich HB
Basel SBB Terminus	IR 27	Zofingen towards Lucerne
Terminus	RE6 Limited service	Dulliken towards Arth-Goldau
Terminus	RE12	Aarau towards Wettingen
Terminus	RE24	Aarburg-Oftringen towards Lucerne
Olten Hammer towards Biel/Bienne or Oberdorf SO	S20	Terminus
Preceding station	DB Fernverkehr	Following station
Liestal towards Berlin Ostbahnhof	ICE 12	Bern towards Brig or Interlaken Ost
Preceding station	Basel S-Bahn	Following station
Tecknau towards Delémont	S3	Terminus
Trimbach towards Sissach	S9	Terminus
Preceding station	Aargau S-Bahn	Following station
Aarburg-Oftringen towards Langenthal	S23	Dulliken towards Baden
Terminus	S26	Dulliken towards Rotkreuz
Aarburg-Oftringen towards Sursee	S29	Aarau towards Turgi
Preceding station	BLS	Following station
Langenthal towards Bern	IR 17	Terminus
Preceding station	Südostbahn	Following station
Basel SBB Terminus	IR 26	Lucerne towards Locarno
Langenthal towards Bern	IR 35 Aare Linth	Zürich Altstetten towards Chur
Preceding station	Zurich S-Bahn	Following station
Terminus	SN11 Limited service	Dulliken towards Zürich HB
Location
- Location within Switzerland Location within Canton of Solothurn

Olten railway station (German: Bahnhof Olten) is a major hub railway station in the canton of Solothurn, Switzerland, at the junction of lines to Zürich, Bern, Basel, Lucerne and Biel. As a result, Olten is a railway town and was also the site of the main workshop of the Swiss Central Railway (German: Schweizerische Centralbahn), which became a major workshop for the Swiss Federal Railways (SBB CFF FFS). It is the southern terminus of the Basel Regional S-Bahn S3 and S9 lines, the northern terminus of the Lucerne S-Bahn S8 line, and the western terminus of the Aargau S-Bahn S26 line.

Although Olten only has 18,000 inhabitants, the station is used each day by about 80,000 passengers and is one of the 10 busiest in Switzerland, busier than even Geneva. It serves 1,100 trains a day, making it one of the busiest in Switzerland.

== Services ==
As a major railway junction, Olten serves numerous through trains. In addition, a number of local services originate at Olten, including a nighttime services (SN11) offered by the Zürcher Verkehrsverbund (ZVV):

- EuroCity / InterCity / Intercity Express (ICE): half-hourly service to Spiez. Most northbound trains terminate in Basel; a single EuroCity continues to Hamburg-Altona, another to Frankfurt (Main) Hauptbahnhof, and two ICEs continue to Berlin Ostbahnhof. Most southbound trains continue to Interlaken Ost; one train every two hours continues to Brig. Three EuroCity trains continue from Brig to Milano Centrale.
- EuroCity / InterCity / InterRegio: hourly service to Bellinzona and every two hours to Locarno or Lugano; two trains per day continue from Lugano to Milano Centrale.
- InterCity/InterRegio: half-hourly service between Biel/Bienne and Zürich Hauptbahnhof; hourly service to Lausanne and Rorschach.
- InterRegio: three trains per hour to Bern, two trains per hour to Zürich Hauptbahnhof, and one train per hour to Chur.
- RegioExpress:
  - hourly service to Lucerne.
  - hourly service to Wettingen.
- S20: half-hourly service to Solothurn, with trains continuing from Solothurn to Biel/Bienne, Langendorf, Lommiswil or Oberdorf SO.
- Aargau S-Bahn:
  - S23: hourly service to Baden and half-hourly service to Langenthal.
  - S26: hourly service to Rotkreuz.
  - S29: half-hourly service between Zofingen and Turgi; every other train continues from Zofingen to Sursee.
- Basel trinational S-Bahn:
  - S3: half-hourly service to Laufen and two trains per day to Delémont.
  - S9: hourly service to Sissach.
- Zurich S-Bahn:
  - SN11: on Friday and Saturday night, hourly service to Zürich HB.

== See also ==
- History of rail transport in Switzerland
- Rail transport in Switzerland
