= Langendorf railway station =

Railway station in Langendorf, Switzerland

Langendorf
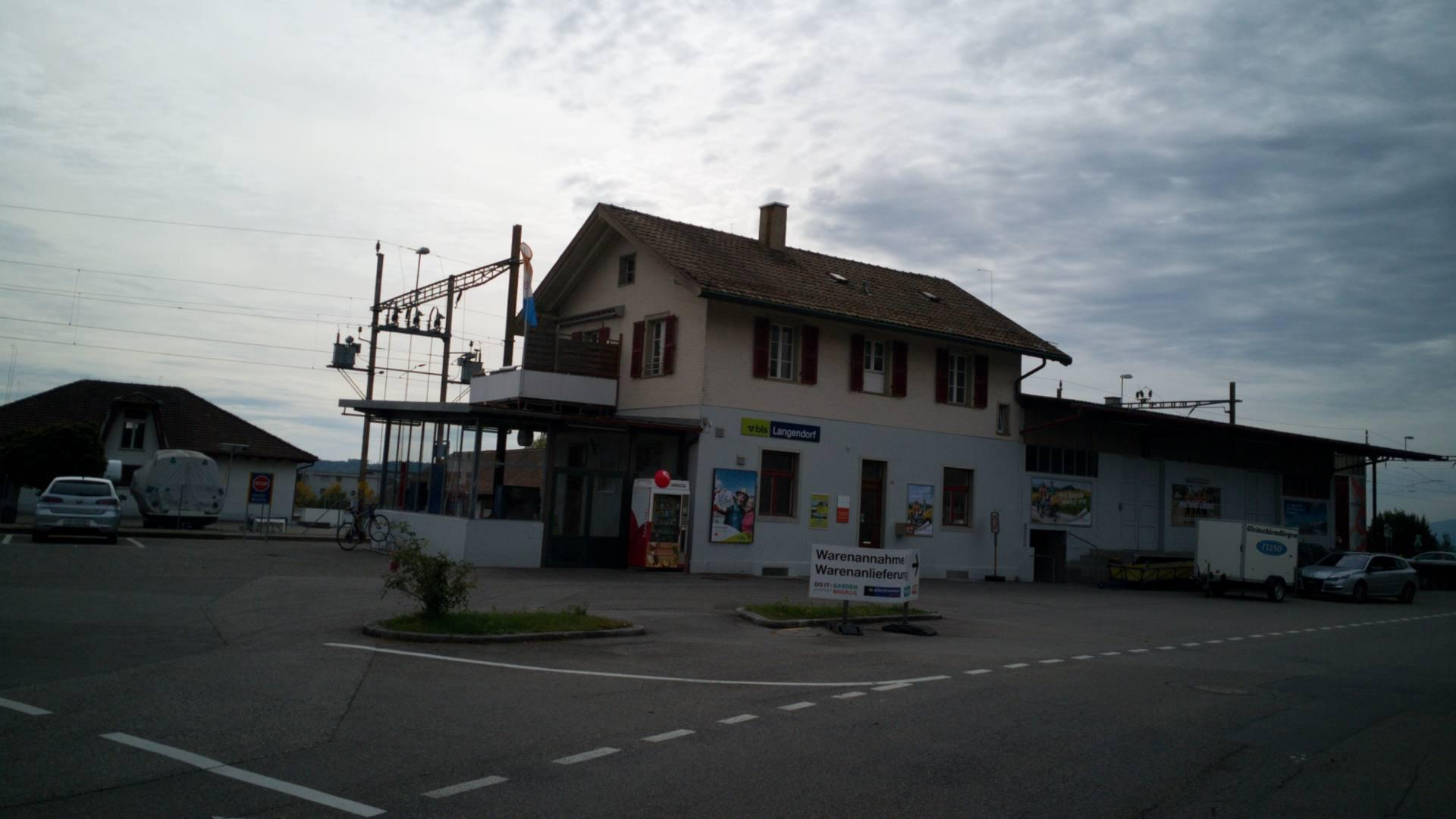
- The station building in 2018

General information
- Location: Langendorf; Switzerland
- Coordinates: 47°13′05″N 7°30′47″E
- Elevation: 470 m (1,540 ft)
- Owner: BLS AG
- Line: Solothurn–Moutier line
- Distance: 1.9 km (1.2 mi) from Solothurn West
- Platforms: 1
- Tracks: 2
- Train operators: Swiss Federal Railways
- Connections: Busbetrieb Solothurn und Umgebung buses

Construction
- Parking: Yes (25 spaces)
- Accessible: No

Other information
- Station code: 8500261 (LADO)
- Fare zone: 201 (Libero)

Passengers
- 2023: 360 per weekday (SBB)

Services
Preceding station	SBB CFF FFS	Following station
Oberdorf SO Terminus	S20 Sundays	Solothurn West towards Olten
Lommiswil Terminus	S20 Except Sundays	Solothurn West towards Olten
Terminus	S20 Except Sundays	Solothurn West towards Olten
Lommiswil towards Oberdorf SO	S21	Solothurn West towards Solothurn
Location

Langendorf railway station (German: Bahnhof Langendorf) is a railway station in the municipality of Langendorf, in the Swiss canton of Solothurn. It is an intermediate stop on the standard gauge Solothurn–Moutier line of BLS AG and is served by local trains only.

== History ==
Between Spring 2024 and March 2026, the Weissenstein Tunnel is getting a renovation and remains closed. The BLS is using the tunnel closure to renovate the whole of the line. This station will be modernized to permit barrier-free boarding, the construction start for the station is planned for 2026. S21 trains terminate at Oberdorf SO and replacement buses are running between Gänsbrunnen and Moutier during the construction work.

== Services ==
As of the December 2024 timetable change, the following services stop at Langendorf:

- S20: limited service to Olten, Lommiswil, or Oberdorf SO.
- S21: hourly service between Oberdorf SO and Solothurn.
