= Oberdorf SO railway station =

Railway station in Oberdorf, Solothurn Switzerland

Oberdorf SO
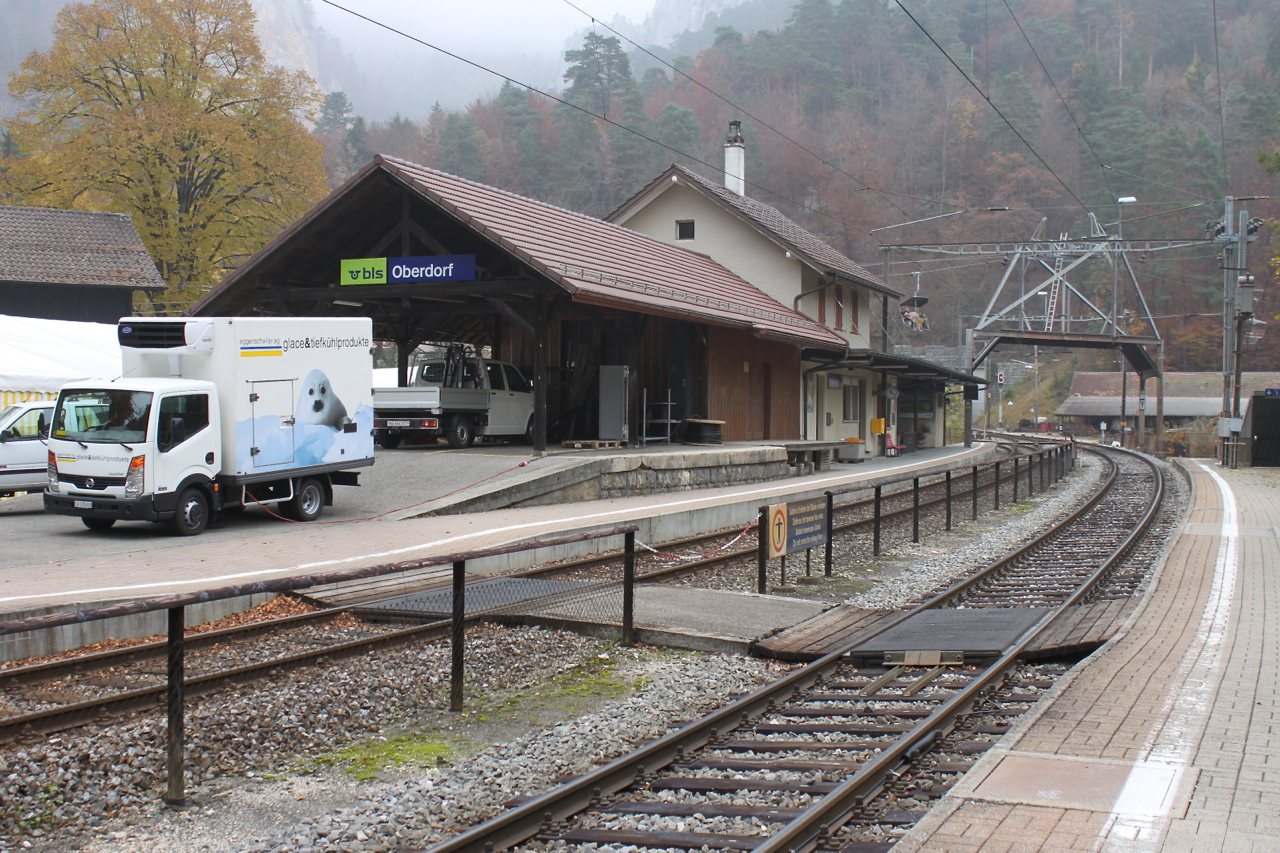
- The station building in 2009

General information
- Location: Oberdorf; Switzerland
- Coordinates: 47°14′10″N 7°29′38″E
- Elevation: 655 m (2,149 ft)
- Owner: BLS AG
- Line: Solothurn–Moutier line
- Distance: 9.6 km (6.0 mi) from Solothurn West
- Platforms: 2
- Tracks: 2
- Train operators: Swiss Federal Railways

Construction
- Parking: Yes (120 spaces)
- Accessible: No

Other information
- Station code: 8500264 (ODF)
- Fare zone: 201 (Libero)

Passengers
- 2023: 190 per weekday (SBB)

Services
Preceding station	SBB CFF FFS	Following station
Terminus	S20 Sundays	Langendorf towards Olten
Terminus	S21	Im Holz towards Solothurn
Location

Oberdorf SO railway station (German: Bahnhof Oberdorf SO) is a railway station in the municipality of Oberdorf, in the Swiss canton of Solothurn. It is an intermediate stop on the standard gauge Solothurn–Moutier line of BLS AG and is served by local trains only. The station is adjacent to the valley station for a gondola lift to the Weissenstein.

== History ==
Between Spring 2024 and March 2026, the Weissenstein Tunnel is getting a renovation and remains closed. The BLS is using the tunnel closure to renovate the whole of the line. This station will be modernized to permit barrier-free boarding and will have convenient transfer to the Weissenstein cable car valley station. S21 trains terminate at this station and replacement buses are running between Gänsbrunnen and Moutier during the construction work.

== Services ==
As of the December 2024 timetable change, the following services stop at Oberdorf SO:

- S20: hourly service on Sundays to Olten.
- S21: hourly service to Solothurn.
