= Jura Foot Line =

Olten-Lausanne railway line

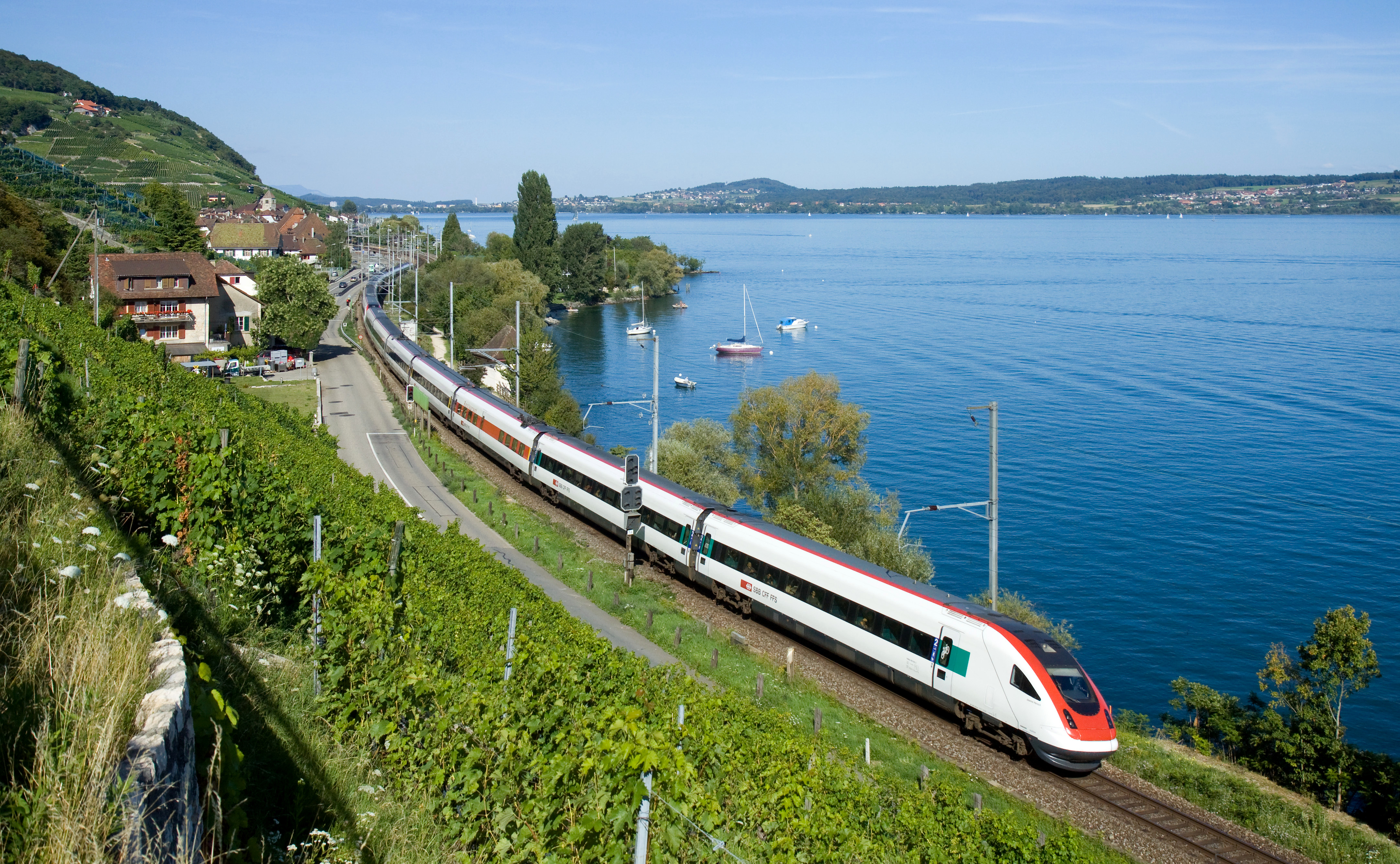
- ICN running near Twann. This single track section will by-passed by the new, double track Ligerz Tunnel

Overview
- Termini: Olten; Geneva

Technical
- Number of tracks: 2 (mostly)
- Track gauge: 1,435 mm (4 ft 8 1/2 in)
- Electrification: 15 kV/16 2/3 Hz AC overhead catenary

The Jura Foot Line (French: ligne du Pied-du-Jura, German: Jurafusslinie) or Jura South Foot Line, is a railway line in Switzerland. It runs from Olten along the foot of the southern Jura range through Solothurn, Grenchen, Biel/Bienne, Neuchâtel, Yverdon-les-Bains and Morges to Lausanne. It is one of two routes used by intercity trains between Geneva and Zürich. The other is the Midland line (German: Mittellandlinie) which connects Olten via Langenthal, Burgdorf, Bern, Fribourg, Lausanne to Morges. The line was built by five railway companies, which after several mergers were absorbed into the Swiss Federal Railways in 1903.

The line is electrified at 15 kV 16.7 Hz AC and is two track almost throughout. The sole remaining single section, south of Twann station and north of La Neuveville, is the location of the new Ligerz Tunnel. This is due to open at the end of 2029 and will complete the double-tracking of the line.

The southern part of the line forms part of the Lausanne–Geneva railway.

== History ==
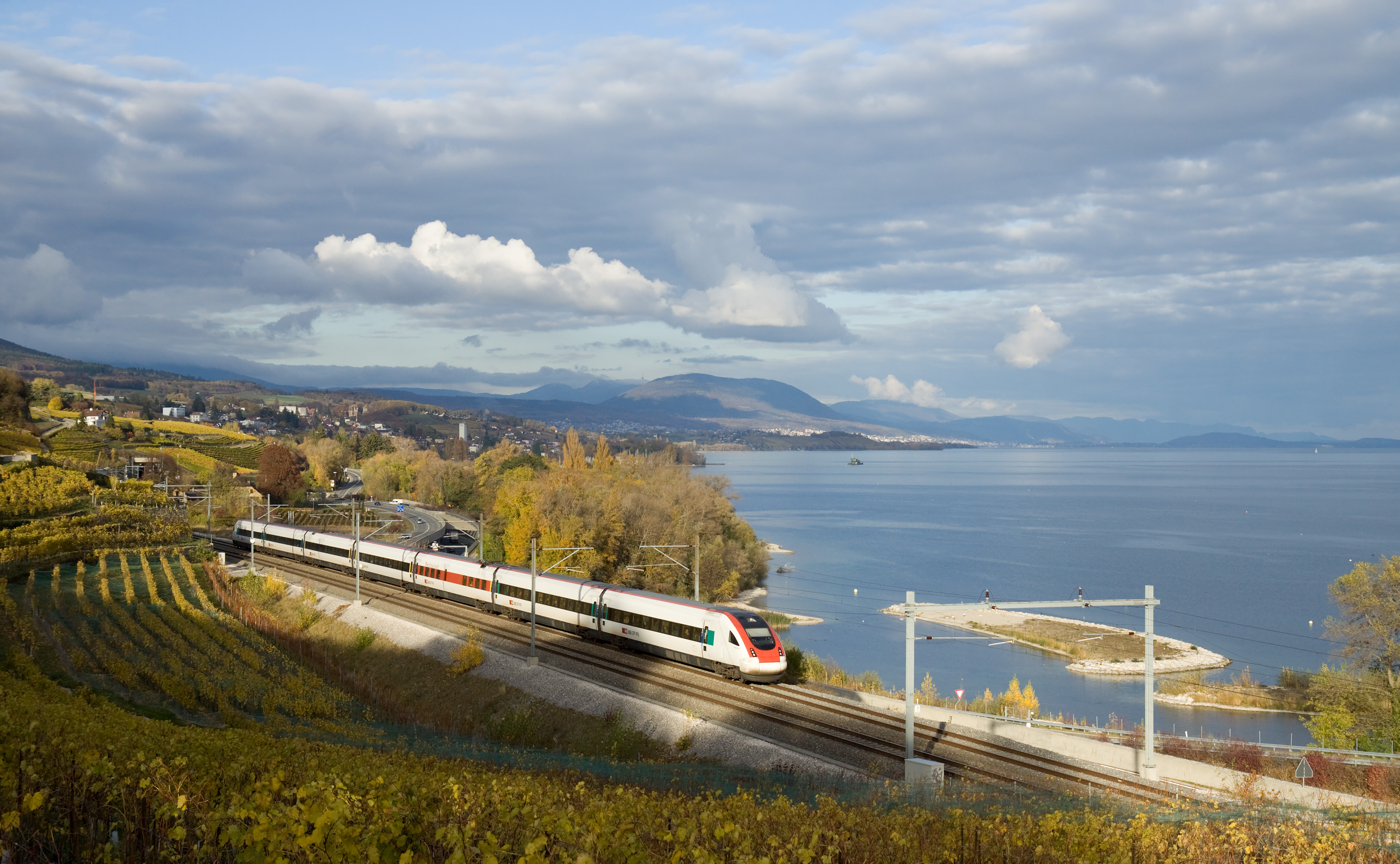
ICN above Lake Neuchâtel, near Vaumarcus

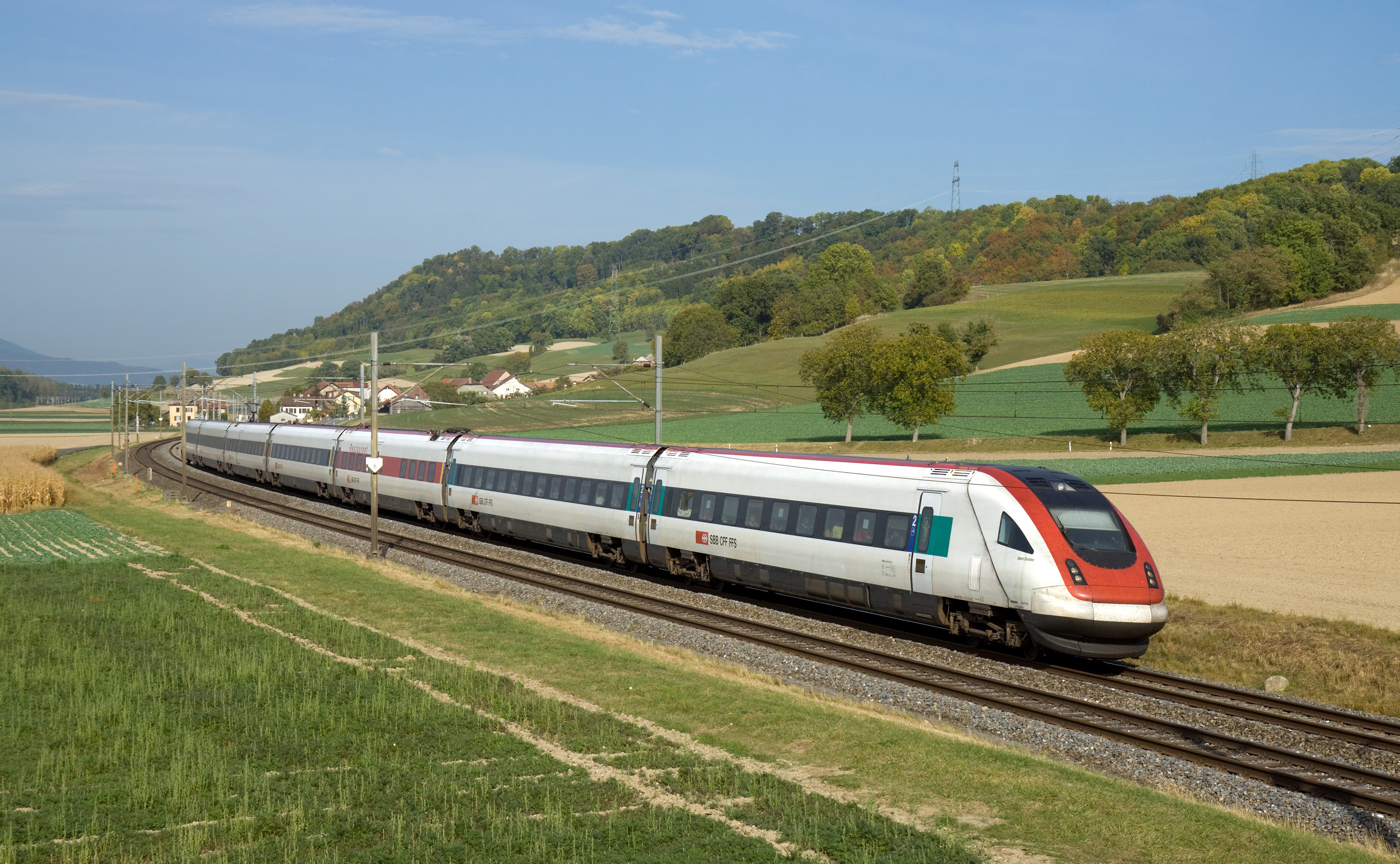
ICN near Essert-Pittet

The Jura Foot Line was built in several stages. The oldest part are the sections opened by the West Switzerland Company (French: Compagnie de l'Ouest-Suisse, OS) in May 1855 from Yverdon-les-Bains to Bussigny-près-Lausanne and in July 1855 from Bussigny to Morges via Renens. On 5 May 1856, the company opened two new sections, Renens to Lausanne and the connecting curve from Morges to Bussigny. The OS opened a line from Morges to Coppet on 14 April 1858 and a line from Coppet to Versoix on the following 21 April. On 25 June 1858 the OS connected with Geneva with the opening of the Versoix–Geneva route of the Geneva–Versoix Railway (French: Chemin de fer Genève–Versoix, GM). In 1859 it opened the section from Yverdon to Vaumarcus. On 7 November 1859 the Franco-Swiss Company (French: Compagnie Franco-Suisse, LFB) opened an extension from Vaumarcus to the village of Frienisberg, near Le Landeron on Lake Biel. A temporary station was established at a pier in Frienisberg for a link by boat across Lake Biel to a station at Nidau near Biel built by the Swiss Central Railway (German: Schweizerische Centralbahn, SCB).

From the other direction in 1857 the SCB opened the line from Olten via Herzogenbuchsee to Solothurn and along the current route to Biel south of Solothurn. This route avoided having to cross the Aare river between Olten and Solothurn, but is longer than the route opened in 1876. In 1858 the SCB built a short line from Biel station to Nidau on Lake Biel, from where a connection by ship over Lake Biel was opened in 1859 to the temporary station at Frienisberg. The gap along the northern shore of Lake Biel from Biel to Landeron was closed on 3 December 1860 by the Swiss East–West Railway (German: Schweizerische Ostwestbahn, OWB). As a result, the short line from Biel to Nidau closed on 10 December 1860. It was now possible for the first time to travel from the east of Switzerland at St. Margrethen to its west at Geneva by train, although the different railway companies involved meant that several changes of train were necessary.

The last section of the line to be completed was the section from Olten to Solothurn via Oensingen opened on 4 December 1876 by the SCB, also called the Gäu railway (German: Gäubahn). This was originally planned as part of the Swiss National Railway's proposed line from Lake Constance to Lake Geneva. The line from Herzogenbuchsee to Solothurn became a local railway after it was bypassed by the Gäu railway. As part of Rail 2000, the line and its stations at Derendingen, Subingen, Etziken and Inkwil were closed in 1992 and most of it was rebuilt as a connecting line without stations for high-speed passenger trains from Solothurn to the Mattstetten–Rothrist new line, connecting at a junction at Wanzwil and opened on 12 December 2004. Under the Rail 2000 program, a winding single-track section along the shore of Lake Neuchâtel between Gorgier-St-Aubin and Concise was replaced by a double track section mostly in tunnel, which was opened in 2000.
