= Biel/Bienne Bözingenfeld/Champ railway station =

Train station in Switzerland

Biel/Bienne Bözingenfeld/Champ
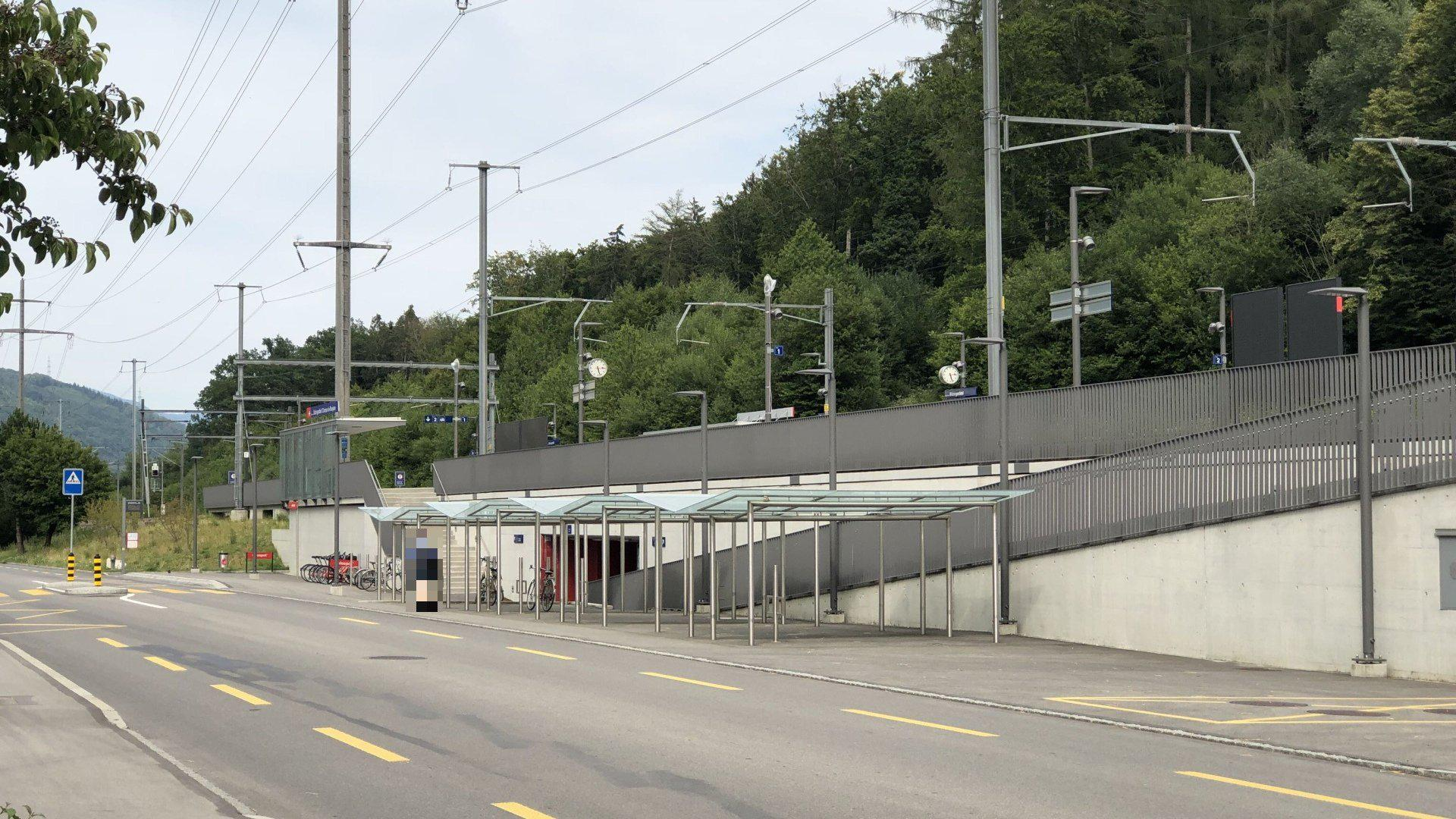
- The station platforms in 2018

General information
- Other names: Biel/Bienne Bözingenfeld/Champs-de-Boujean
- Location: Biel/Bienne; Switzerland
- Coordinates: 47°9′30.197″N 7°17′40.513″E
- Owner: Swiss Federal Railways
- Lines: Basel–Biel/Bienne line; Jura Foot line
- Train operators: Swiss Federal Railways

History
- Opened: 15 December 2013

Services
Preceding station	SBB CFF FFS	Following station
Biel Mett towards Biel/Bienne	S20	Pieterlen towards Olten
Location
- Location within Switzerland

Biel/Bienne Bözingenfeld/Champ railway station (German: Bahnhof Biel/Bienne Bözingenfeld/Champ) is a railway station in the municipality of Biel/Bienne, in the Swiss canton of Bern. It is an intermediate stop on the Basel–Biel/Bienne and Jura Foot lines, although trains traveling south on the Basel–Biel/Bienne line from Grenchen Nord do not stop here.

The station opened on 15 December 2013. In the planning stages, it was known as Bözingenfeld Ost railway station. The long name of the station is Biel/Bienne Bözingenfeld/Champs-de-Boujean.

== Services ==
As of the December 2021 timetable change, the following services stop at Biel/Bienne Bözingenfeld/Champ:

- S20: half-hourly service between Biel/Bienne and Solothurn, with every other train continuing from Solothurn to Olten.
