= Pieterlen railway station =

Railway station in Switzerland

Pieterlen
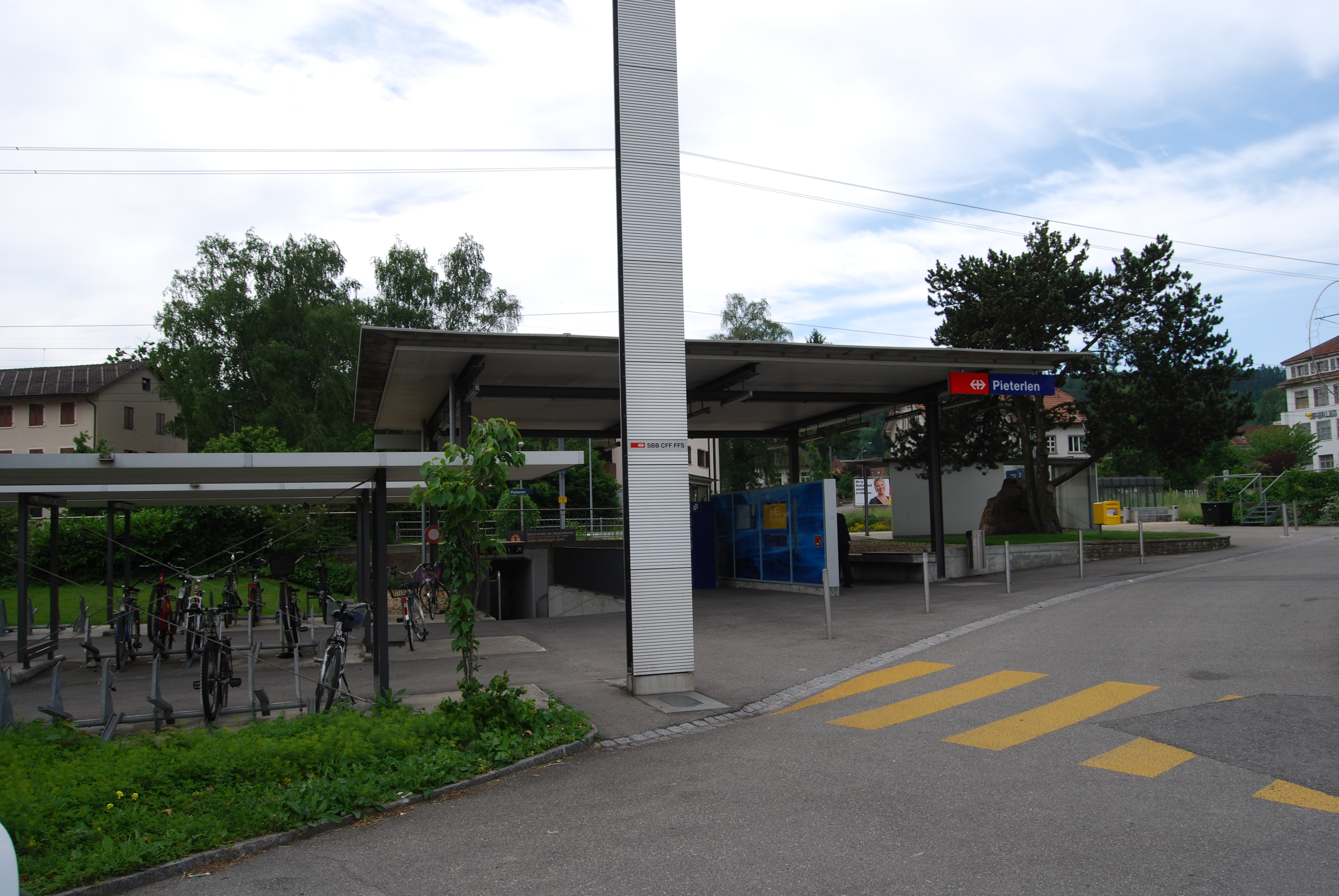
- The station entrance in 2012

General information
- Location: Pieterlen; Switzerland
- Coordinates: 47°10′30″N 7°20′2″E
- Owner: Swiss Federal Railways
- Lines: Basel–Biel/Bienne line; Jura Foot line
- Train operators: Swiss Federal Railways

Services
Preceding station	SBB CFF FFS	Following station
Biel/Bienne Bözingenfeld/Champ towards Biel/Bienne	S20	Lengnau towards Olten
Location
- Location within Switzerland

Pieterlen railway station (German: Bahnhof Pieterlen) is a railway station in the municipality of Pieterlen, in the Swiss canton of Bern. It is an intermediate stop on the Basel–Biel/Bienne and Jura Foot lines, although trains traveling south on the Basel–Biel/Bienne line from Grenchen Nord do not stop here. It is served by regional trains only.

== Services ==
As of the December 2021 timetable change, the following services stop at Pieterlen:

- S20: half-hourly service between Biel/Bienne and Solothurn, with every other train continuing from Solothurn to Olten.
