= Lengnau railway station =

Railway station in Switzerland

Lengnau
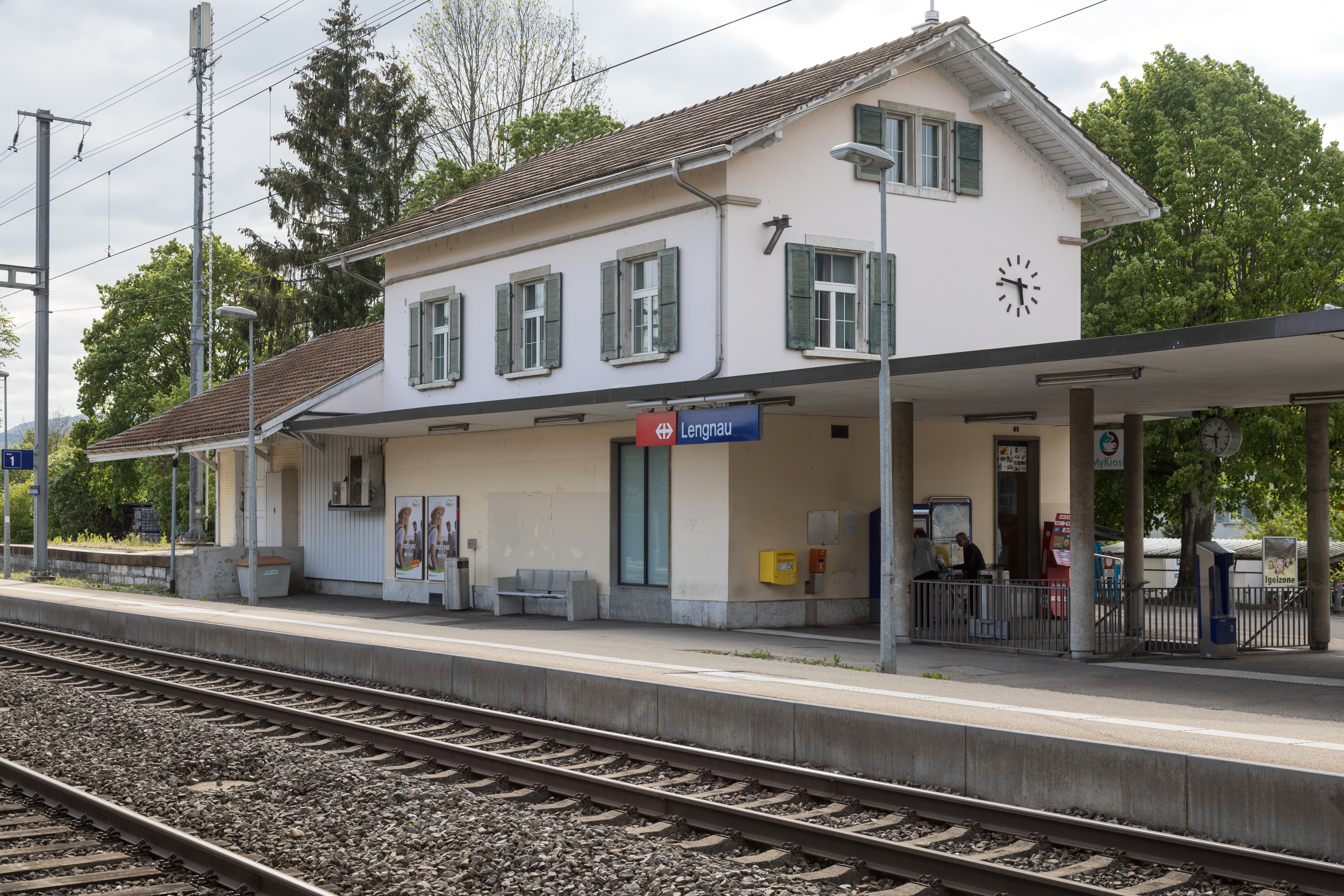
- The station building in 2019

General information
- Location: Lengnau; Switzerland
- Coordinates: 47°10′55″N 7°21′41″E
- Owner: Swiss Federal Railways
- Lines: Basel–Biel/Bienne line; Jura Foot line
- Train operators: Swiss Federal Railways

Services
Preceding station	SBB CFF FFS	Following station
Pieterlen towards Biel/Bienne	S20	Grenchen Süd towards Olten
Location
- Location within Switzerland

Lengnau railway station (German: Bahnhof Lengnau) is a railway station in the municipality of Lengnau, in the Swiss canton of Bern. It is an intermediate stop on the Basel–Biel/Bienne and Jura Foot lines, although trains traveling south on the Basel–Biel/Bienne line from Grenchen Nord do not stop here. It is served by regional trains only.

== Services ==
As of the December 2021 timetable change, the following services stop at Lengnau:

- S20: half-hourly service between Biel/Bienne and Solothurn, with every other train continuing from Solothurn to Olten.
