= Biel Mett railway station =

Railway station in Biel, Switzerland

Biel Mett
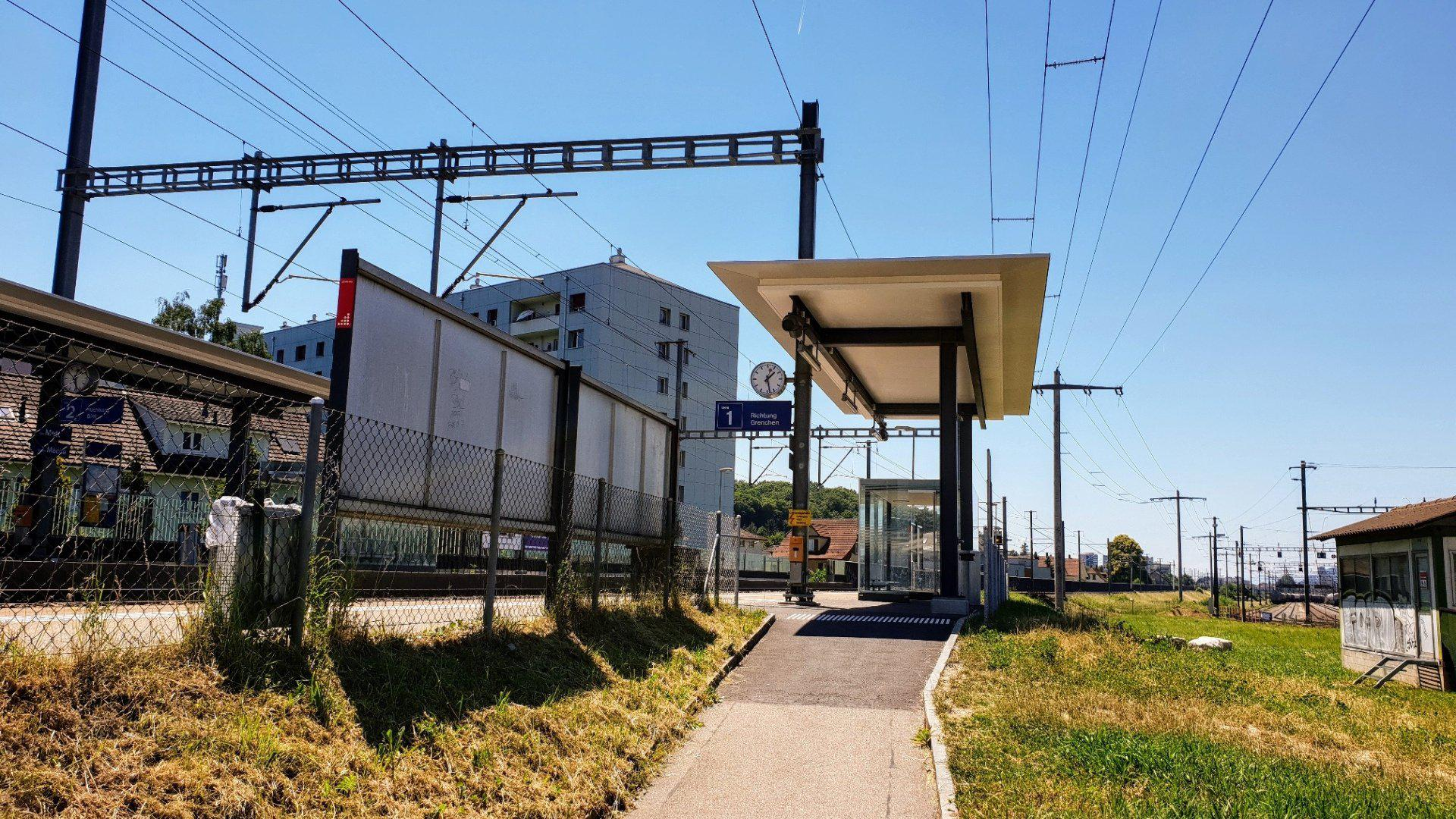
- The eastbound platform in 2018

General information
- Location: Biel/Bienne; Switzerland
- Coordinates: 47°08′41″N 7°16′21″E
- Elevation: 442 m (1,450 ft)
- Owner: Swiss Federal Railways
- Lines: Basel–Biel/Bienne line; Jura Foot line
- Distance: 96.3 km (59.8 mi) from Zürich HB
- Platforms: 2 side platforms
- Tracks: 2
- Train operators: Swiss Federal Railways
- Connections: Verkehrsbetriebe Biel/Transports publics biennois bus line; Aare Seeland mobil bus line

Construction
- Accessible: No

Other information
- Station code: 8504419 (BIM)
- Fare zone: 300 (Libero)

Passengers
- 2024: 940 per weekday (SBB)

Services
Preceding station	SBB CFF FFS	Following station
Biel/Bienne Terminus	S20	Biel/Bienne Bözingenfeld/Champ towards Olten
Location
- Location within Switzerland Location within Canton of Bern

Biel Mett railway station (German: Bahnhof Biel Mett) is a railway station in the municipality of Biel/Bienne, in the Swiss canton of Bern. It is an intermediate stop on the Basel–Biel/Bienne and Jura Foot lines, although trains traveling south on the Basel–Biel/Bienne line from Grenchen Nord do not stop here. It is served by regional trains only.

== Services ==
As of the December 2024 timetable change, the following services stop at Biel Mett:

- S20: half-hourly service between Biel/Bienne and Solothurn, with every other train continuing from Solothurn to Olten.
