= Grenchen Süd railway station =

Railway station in Switzerland

Grenchen Süd
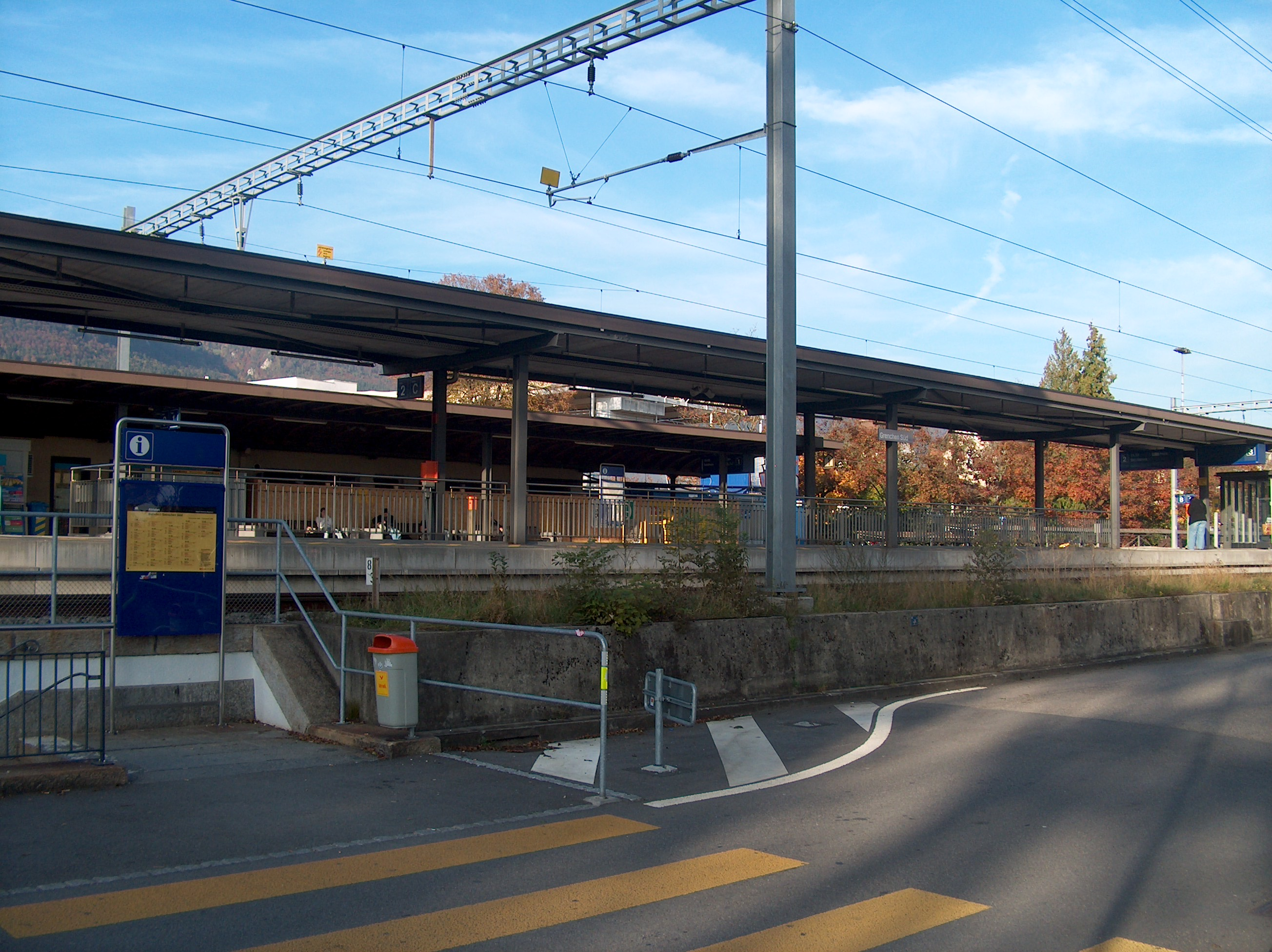
- The station in 2009

General information
- Location: Grenchen; Switzerland
- Coordinates: 47°11′19.3″N 7°23′54.2″E
- Owner: Swiss Federal Railways
- Line: Jura Foot line
- Train operators: Swiss Federal Railways

Services
Preceding station	SBB CFF FFS	Following station
Biel/Bienne towards Lausanne	IC 5 Limited service	Solothurn towards Zürich HB, St. Gallen or Rorschach
Biel/Bienne Terminus	IR 55	Solothurn towards Zürich HB
Lengnau towards Biel/Bienne	S20	Bettlach towards Olten
Location
- Location within Switzerland Location within Canton of Solothurn

Grenchen Süd railway station (German: Bahnhof Grenchen Süd) is a railway station in the municipality of Grenchen, in the Swiss canton of Solothurn. It is an intermediate stop on the Jura Foot line and is served by regional and long-distance trains. The station is located south of Grenchen's city center, approximately 1 kilometre (0.62 mi) from Grenchen Nord railway station on the Basel–Biel/Bienne line.

== Services ==
As of the December 2025 timetable change, the following services stop at Grenchen Süd:

- InterCity: individual trains to Rorschach and Lausanne.
- InterRegio: hourly service over the Jura Foot line between Biel/Bienne and Zürich Hauptbahnhof.
- S20: half-hourly service between Biel/Bienne and Solothurn, with every other train continuing from Solothurn to Olten.
