= Lengnau =

Lengnau may refer to one of the following municipalities in Switzerland:

- Lengnau, Aargau, in the Canton of Aargau
- Lengnau, Bern, in the Canton of Bern
