= Lengnau, Bern =

Lengnau
- Municipality
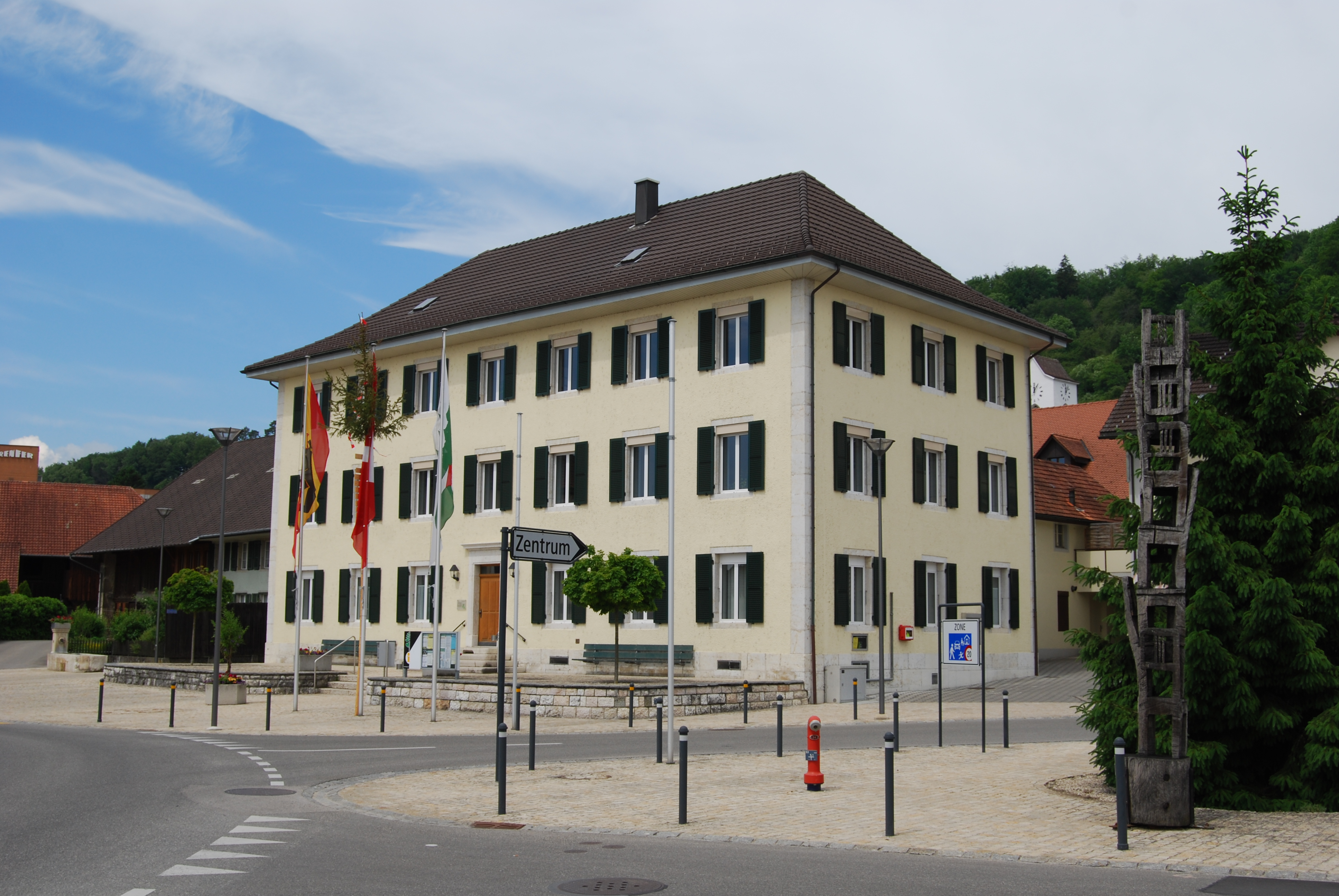
- Lengnau parish hall

- Flag Coat of arms
- Location of Lengnau
- Location within Switzerland Location within Canton of Bern
- Coordinates: 47°11′N 7°22′E
- Country: Switzerland
- Canton: Bern
- District: Biel/Bienne

Government
  - Executive: Gemeinderat with 7 members
  - Mayor: Gemeindepräsident; Sandra Huber-Müller SPS/PSS (as of 2026)

Area
  - Total: 7.3 km^{2} (2.8 sq mi)
- Elevation: 445 m (1,460 ft)

Population (December 2020)
  - Total: 5,316
  - Density: 730/km^{2} (1,900/sq mi)
- Time zone: UTC+01:00 (CET)
  - Summer (DST): UTC+02:00 (CEST)
- Postal code: 2543
- SFOS number: 387
- ISO 3166 code: CH-BE
- Surrounded by: Büren an der Aare, Grenchen (SO), Meinisberg, Pieterlen, Romont
- Twin towns: Lengnau, Aargau (Switzerland), Monteroni (Italy), Strakonice (Czech Republic)
- Website: www.lengnau.ch

Lengnau (German pronunciation: [ˈlɛŋnaʊ]) is a municipality in the Biel/Bienne administrative district in the canton of Bern in Switzerland.

== History ==
Lengnau is first mentioned around 983-1002 as Lengenach. In 1228 it was mentioned as Longieuva. The municipality was formerly known by its French name Longeau, however, that name is no longer used.

The oldest traces of humans are Late-Paleolithic to Neolithic flint tools and other objects which were discovered on the Aare river plain. During the Bronze Age, the La Tene era and the Roman era there were settlements in the municipal borders. During the Middle Ages it was part of the Herrschaft of Strassberg, which was acquired by Bern in 1388-93. Lengnau was placed in the bailiwick of Büren. In 1318, during a conflict between Solothurn and Habsburg Austria the village and its church were burned. The church was rebuilt and christened St. Germanus Church in 1323. The church was rebuilt in 1630-40 and renovated in 1959-60.

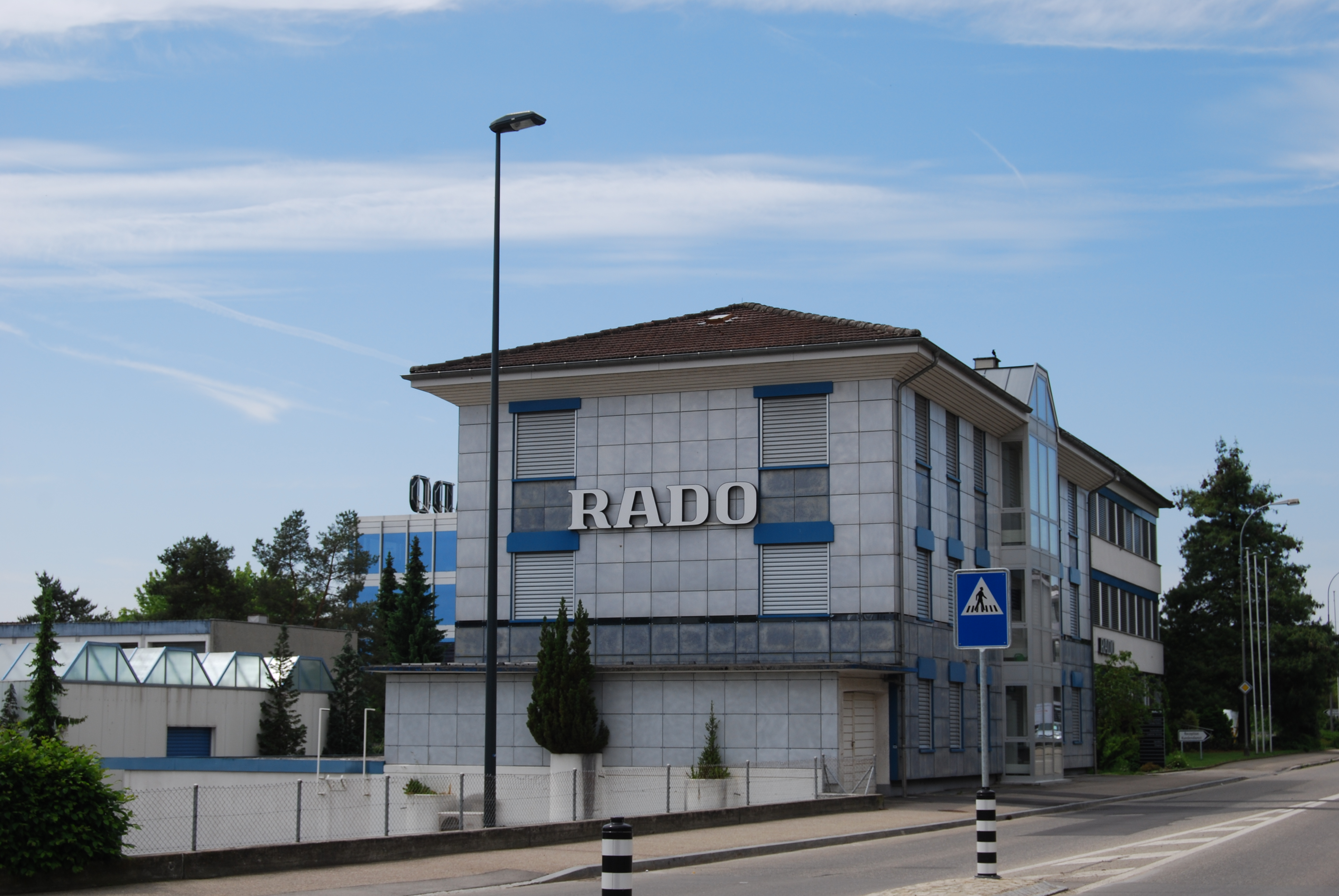
Rado building in Lengnau

The Jura water correction projects of the 19th century, drained much of the previously unusable Aare flood plain and opened up extensive agricultural land in Lengnau. During the same time, Lengnau began to develop from a farming village into a watch making town with industries. During the period from 1889 until 1927 about a dozen watch producers and watch part manufacturers opened factories in the growing town. In addition to watchmakers, other industries, such as timber cutters and engineering firms opened in town. During the 19th century clay with a high quartz content was mined in the Lengnauwald. However, in the 1970s the watch industry experienced a crisis and many of the manufacturers closed down. Despite the establishment of new industries in 1983, including; precision machines, electronics companies and décolletage, many workers commute to jobs in other towns. By 2000 over two thirds of those employed worked in neighboring towns, especially Biel/Bienne, Solothurn and Bern. The town has good transportation links. A train station on the Olten-Biel line opened in Lengnau in 1857 and a branch to Moutier was added in 1915. Between 1950 and 1990 many new buildings were finished in town. These include the Catholic parish church over the Lengnau-Pieterlen-Meinisberg parish in 1975 and the nursing home in 1988. Lengnau has three schools and is also home to the secondary school which was founded in 1899.

== Geography ==
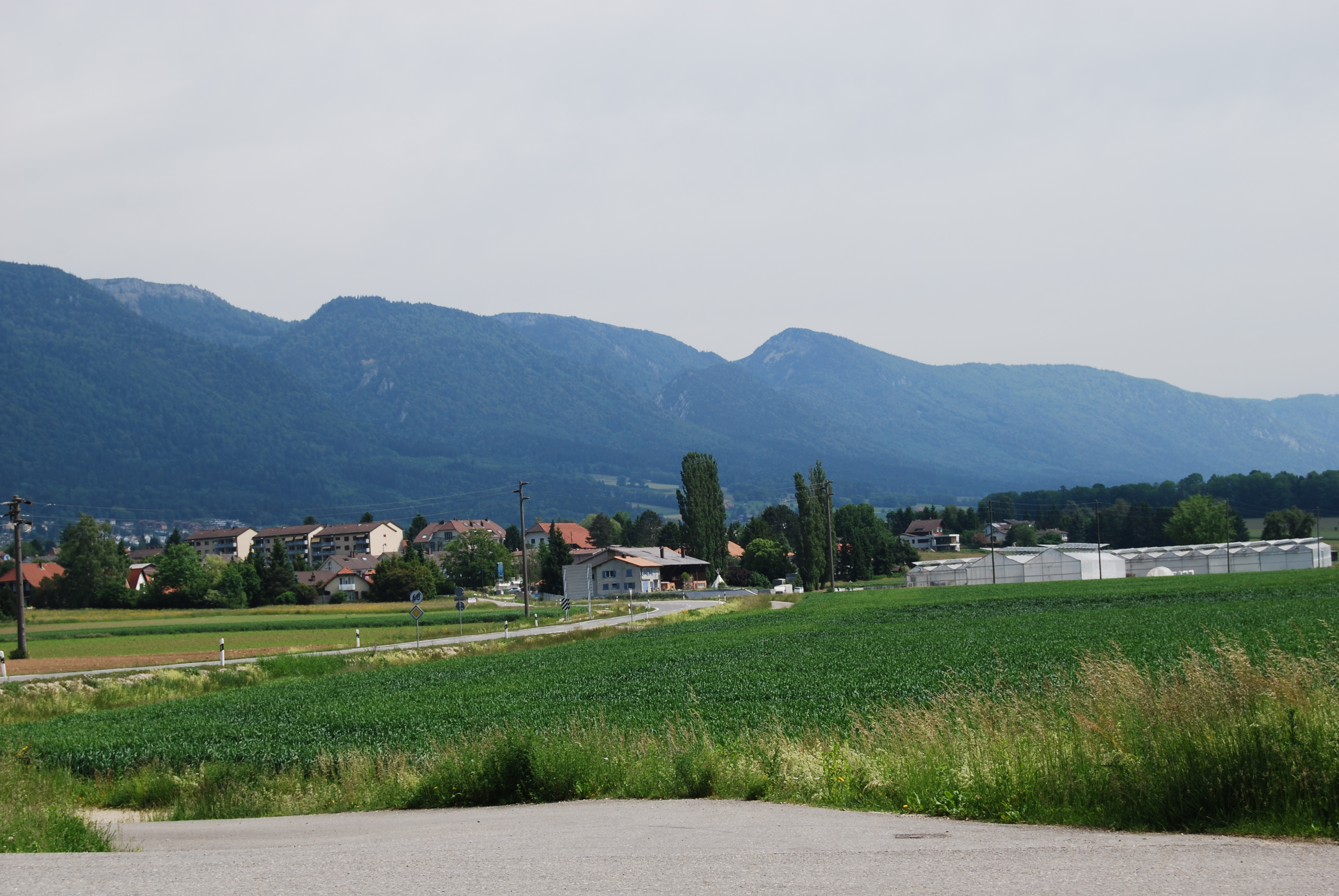
Fields on the outskirts of Lengnau

Aerial view from 400 m by Walter Mittelholzer (1925)

Lengnau has an area of 7.41 km^{2} (2.86 sq mi). Of this area, 2.9 km^{2} (1.1 mi^{2}) or 39.3% is used for agricultural purposes, while 2.66 km^{2} (1.03 mi^{2}) or 36.0% is forested. Of the rest of the land, 1.6 km^{2} (0.62 mi^{2}) or 21.7% is settled (buildings or roads), 0.12 km^{2} (30 acres) or 1.6% is either rivers or lakes and 0.04 km^{2} (9.9 acres) or 0.5% is unproductive land.

Of the built up area, industrial buildings made up 2.6% of the total area while housing and buildings made up 11.1% and transportation infrastructure made up 5.6%. Power and water infrastructure as well as other special developed areas made up 1.2% of the area while parks, green belts and sports fields made up 1.2%. Out of the forested land, 34.6% of the total land area is heavily forested and 1.5% is covered with orchards or small clusters of trees. Of the agricultural land, 32.0% is used for growing crops and 5.7% is pastures, while 1.4% is used for orchards or vine crops. All the water in the municipality is flowing water.

The municipality is located at the foot of the Jura Mountains in the Aare river plains. The old Aare river course forms the municipal border.

On 31 December 2009 Amtsbezirk Büren, the municipality's former district, was dissolved. On the following day, 1 January 2010, it joined the newly created Verwaltungskreis Biel/Bienne.

== Coat of arms ==
The blazon of the municipal coat of arms is Argent a Fir tree Vert trunked Gules issuant from a Mount of 3 Coupeaux of the second.

== Demographics ==
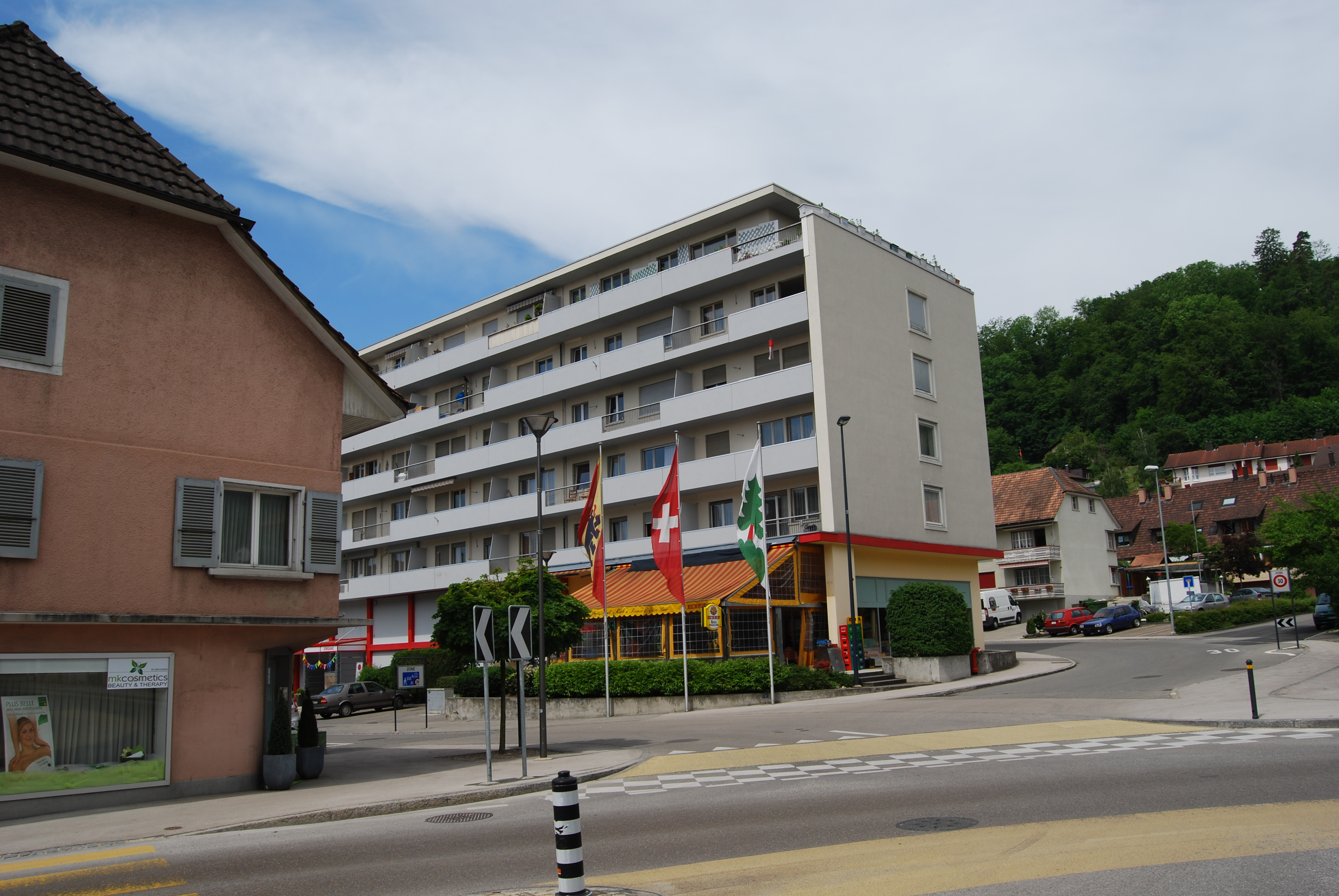
Large apartment building in Lengnau

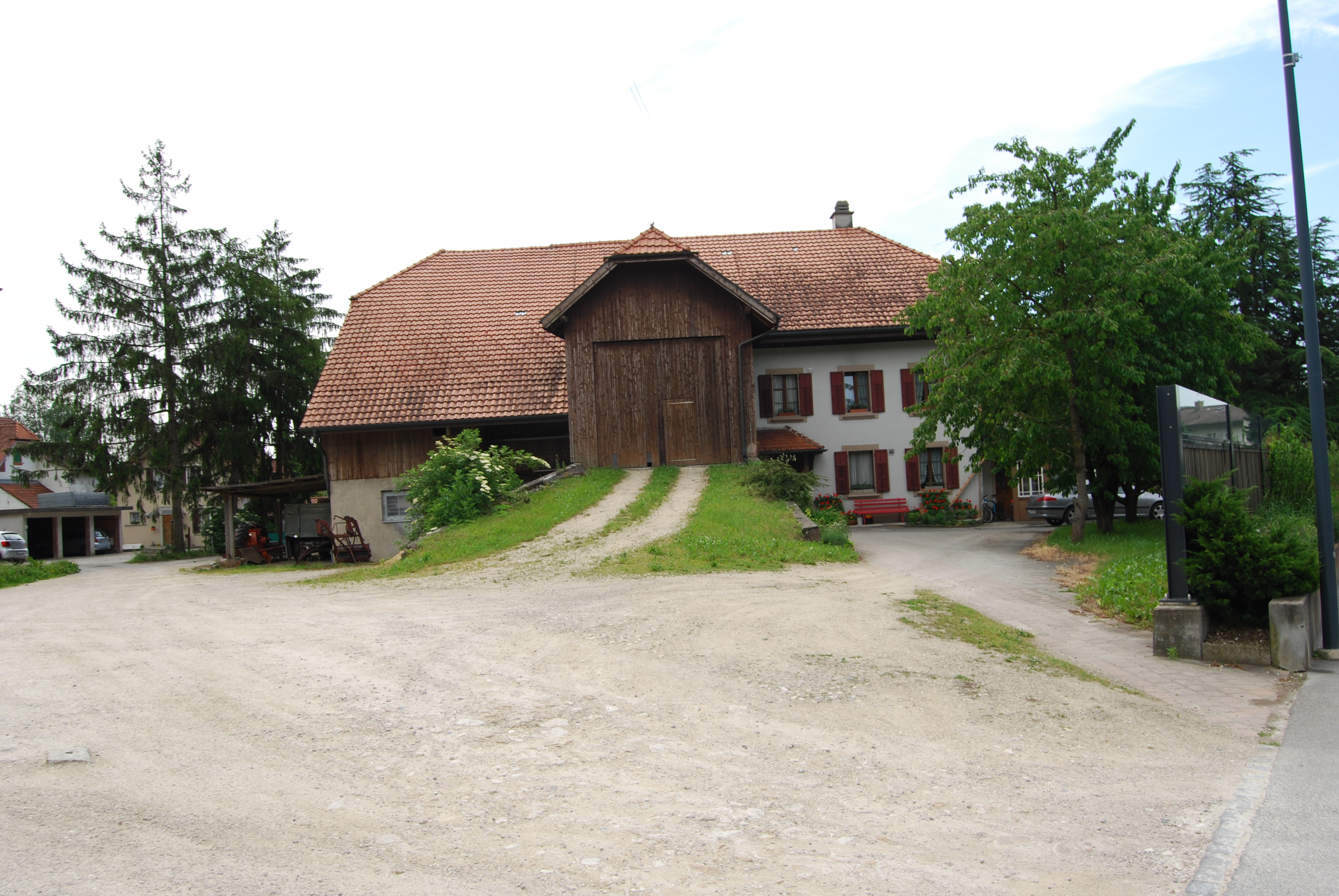
Farm house in Lengnau

Lengnau has a population (as of December 2020) of 5,316. As of 2010, 18.9% of the population are resident foreign nationals. Over the last 10 years (2000-2010) the population has changed at a rate of 2.3%. Migration accounted for 6%, while births and deaths accounted for -2.9%.

Most of the population (as of 2000) speaks German (3,914 or 87.8%) as their first language, French is the second most common (116 or 2.6%) and Italian is the third (103 or 2.3%). There are 3 people who speak Romansh.

As of 2008, the population was 48.8% male and 51.2% female. The population was made up of 1,778 Swiss men (38.6% of the population) and 467 (10.1%) non-Swiss men. There were 1,953 Swiss women (42.4%) and 40 (0.9%) non-Swiss women. Of the population in the municipality, 1,383 or about 31.0% were born in Lengnau and lived there in 2000. There were 1,195 or 26.8% who were born in the same canton, while 1,009 or 22.6% were born somewhere else in Switzerland, and 713 or 16.0% were born outside of Switzerland.

As of 2010, children and teenagers (0–19 years old) make up 18.9% of the population, while adults (20–64 years old) make up 59.7% and seniors (over 64 years old) make up 21.4%.

As of 2000, there were 1,565 people who were single and never married in the municipality. There were 2,319 married individuals, 298 widows or widowers and 277 individuals who are divorced.

As of 2000, there were 612 households that consist of only one person and 97 households with five or more people. In 2000, a total of 1,936 apartments (89.6% of the total) were permanently occupied, while 86 apartments (4.0%) were seasonally occupied and 138 apartments (6.4%) were empty. As of 2010, the construction rate of new housing units was 1.1 new units per 1000 residents. The vacancy rate for the municipality, in 2011, was 1.96%.

The historical population is given in the following chart:

== Politics ==
In the 2011 federal election the most popular party was the SVP which received 31.2% of the vote. The next three most popular parties were the SPS (24.4%), the BDP Party (14.9%) and the FDP (10.9%). In the federal election, a total of 1,341 votes were cast, and the voter turnout was 42.0%.

== Economy ==
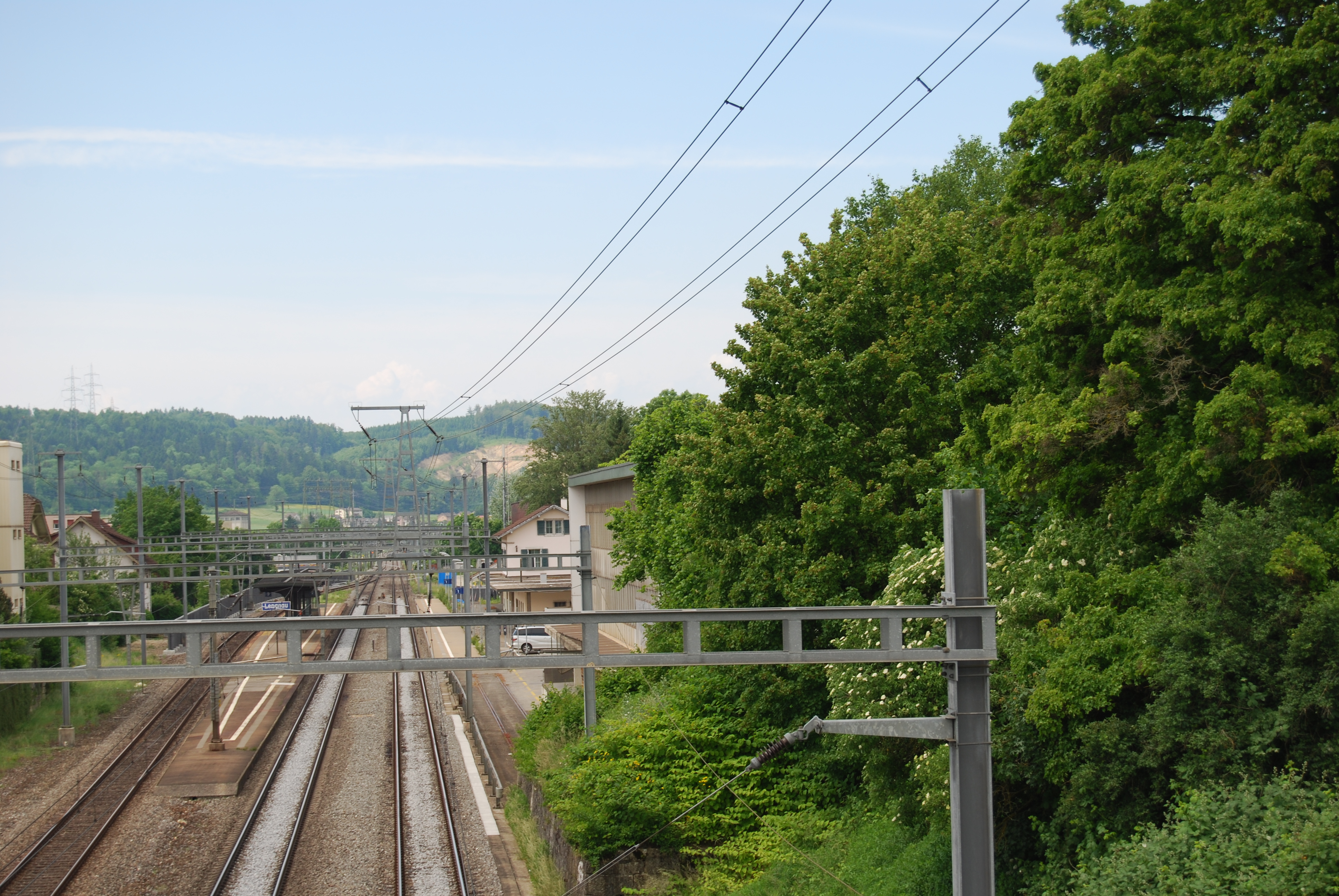
Railway near Lengnau train station

As of 2011, Lengnau had an unemployment rate of 2.74%. As of 2008, there were a total of 1,459 people employed in the municipality. Of these, there were 31 people employed in the primary economic sector and about 10 businesses involved in this sector. 861 people were employed in the secondary sector and there were 70 businesses in this sector. 567 people were employed in the tertiary sector, with 104 businesses in this sector.

In 2008 there were a total of 1,219 full-time equivalent jobs. The number of jobs in the primary sector was 23, of which 19 were in agriculture and 3 were in forestry or lumber production. The number of jobs in the secondary sector was 773 of which 685 or (88.6%) were in manufacturing and 87 (11.3%) were in construction. The number of jobs in the tertiary sector was 423. In the tertiary sector; 134 or 31.7% were in wholesale or retail sales or the repair of motor vehicles, 25 or 5.9% were in a hotel or restaurant, 10 or 2.4% were in the information industry, 11 or 2.6% were the insurance or financial industry, 28 or 6.6% were technical professionals or scientists, 66 or 15.6% were in education and 72 or 17.0% were in health care.

In 2000, there were 841 workers who commuted into the municipality and 1,592 workers who commuted away. The municipality is a net exporter of workers, with about 1.9 workers leaving the municipality for every one entering. Of the working population, 15.6% used public transportation to get to work, and 57.5% used a private car.

== Religion ==
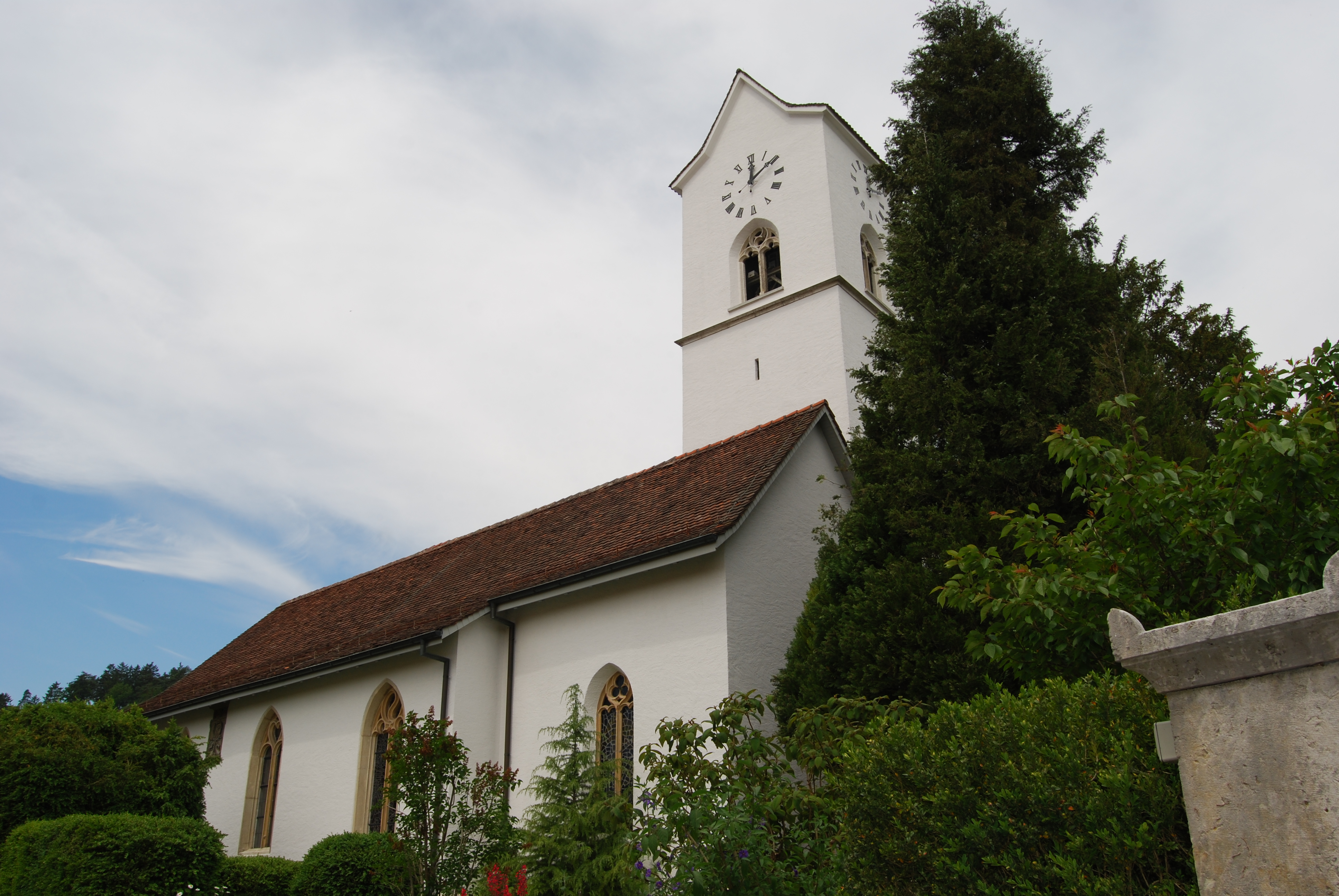
A church in Lengnau

From the 2000 census, 732 or 16.4% were Roman Catholic, while 2,711 or 60.8% belonged to the Swiss Reformed Church. Of the rest of the population, there were 61 members of an Orthodox church (or about 1.37% of the population), there were 4 individuals (or about 0.09% of the population) who belonged to the Christian Catholic Church, and there were 266 individuals (or about 5.97% of the population) who belonged to another Christian church. There was 1 individual who was Jewish, and 216 (or about 4.84% of the population) who were Islamic. There were 31 individuals who were Buddhist, 42 individuals who were Hindu and 4 individuals who belonged to another church. 364 (or about 8.16% of the population) belonged to no church, are agnostic or atheist, and 159 individuals (or about 3.57% of the population) did not answer the question.

== Transport ==
Lengnau sits at the junction of the Basel–Biel/Bienne and Jura Foot railway lines. It is served by regional trains at Lengnau.

== Education ==
In Lengnau about 1,865 or (41.8%) of the population have completed non-mandatory upper secondary education, and 389 or (8.7%) have completed additional higher education (either university or a Fachhochschule). Of the 389 who completed tertiary schooling, 73.5% were Swiss men, 16.7% were Swiss women, 6.9% were non-Swiss men and 2.8% were non-Swiss women.

The Canton of Bern school system provides one year of non-obligatory Kindergarten, followed by six years of Primary school. This is followed by three years of obligatory lower Secondary school where the students are separated according to ability and aptitude. Following the lower Secondary students may attend additional schooling or they may enter an apprenticeship.

During the 2009-10 school year, there were a total of 434 students attending classes in Lengnau. There were 4 kindergarten classes with a total of 69 students in the municipality. Of the kindergarten students, 44.9% were permanent or temporary residents of Switzerland (not citizens) and 43.5% have a different mother language than the classroom language. The municipality had 13 primary classes and 245 students. Of the primary students, 25.3% were permanent or temporary residents of Switzerland (not citizens) and 35.5% have a different mother language than the classroom language. During the same year, there were 6 lower secondary classes with a total of 120 students. There were 21.7% who were permanent or temporary residents of Switzerland (not citizens) and 27.5% have a different mother language than the classroom language.

As of 2000, there were 10 students in Lengnau who came from another municipality, while 136 residents attended schools outside the municipality.
