= Meinisberg =

- Municipality
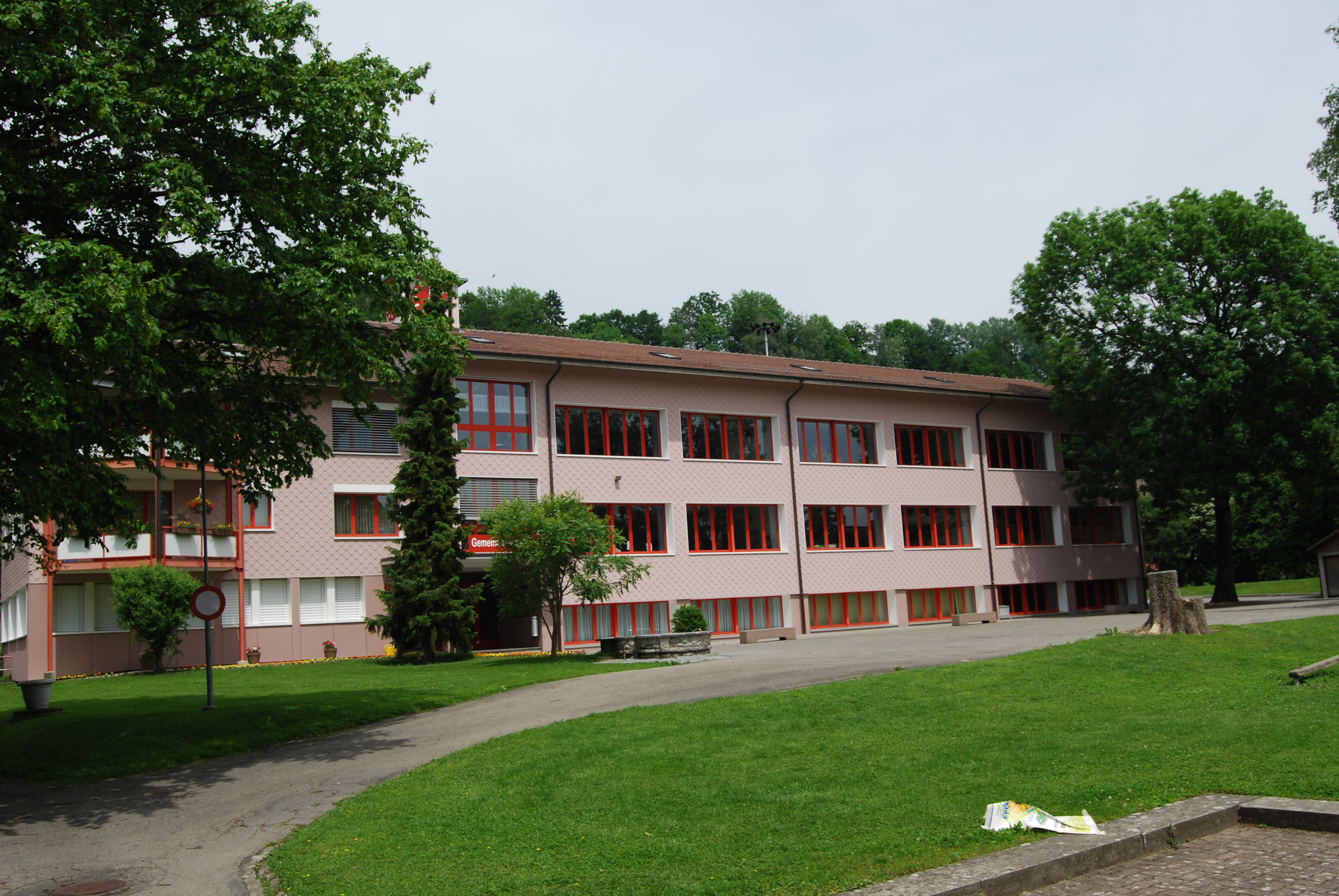
- Meinisberg municipal administration building

- Flag Coat of arms
- Location of Meinisberg
- Location within Switzerland Location within Canton of Bern
- Coordinates: 47°10′N 7°21′E
- Country: Switzerland
- Canton: Bern
- District: Biel/Bienne

Government
  - Executive: Gemeinderat with 5 members
  - Mayor: Gemeindepräsident; Ivan Marti (as of 2026)

Area
  - Total: 4.4 km^{2} (1.7 sq mi)
- Elevation: 445 m (1,460 ft)

Population (December 2020)
  - Total: 1,326
  - Density: 300/km^{2} (780/sq mi)
- Time zone: UTC+01:00 (CET)
  - Summer (DST): UTC+02:00 (CEST)
- Postal code: 2554
- SFOS number: 390
- ISO 3166 code: CH-BE
- Surrounded by: Büren an der Aare, Lengnau, Pieterlen, Safnern
- Website: www.meinisberg.ch

Meinisberg is a municipality in the Biel/Bienne administrative district in the canton of Bern in Switzerland.

== History ==
Meinisberg is first mentioned in 1332 as Meynesberg. The municipality was formerly known by its French name Montmenil, however, that name is no longer used.

The area has been settled since the Mesolithic and Neolithic ages, as finds near the Scheidwegen section of Meinisberg indicate. La Tène and Roman artifacts have been found near the Steinen section and a High Middle Ages wooden castle was found near Reibenwald. From the Late Middle Ages Meinisberg was ruled from Pieterlen which was under the authority of the Prince-Bishop of Basel. In 1816, it came under the authority of Bern and in 1833 became an independent community. At this time it was still part of the parish of Pieterlen. When the Nidau-Büren canal was built (1865–75), the Aare River now ran past Meinisberg. The community grew due to its location on the edge of the Naturschutzgebiets Häftli (Natural Park) and ease of reaching Biel/Bienne from Meinisberg.

== Geography ==
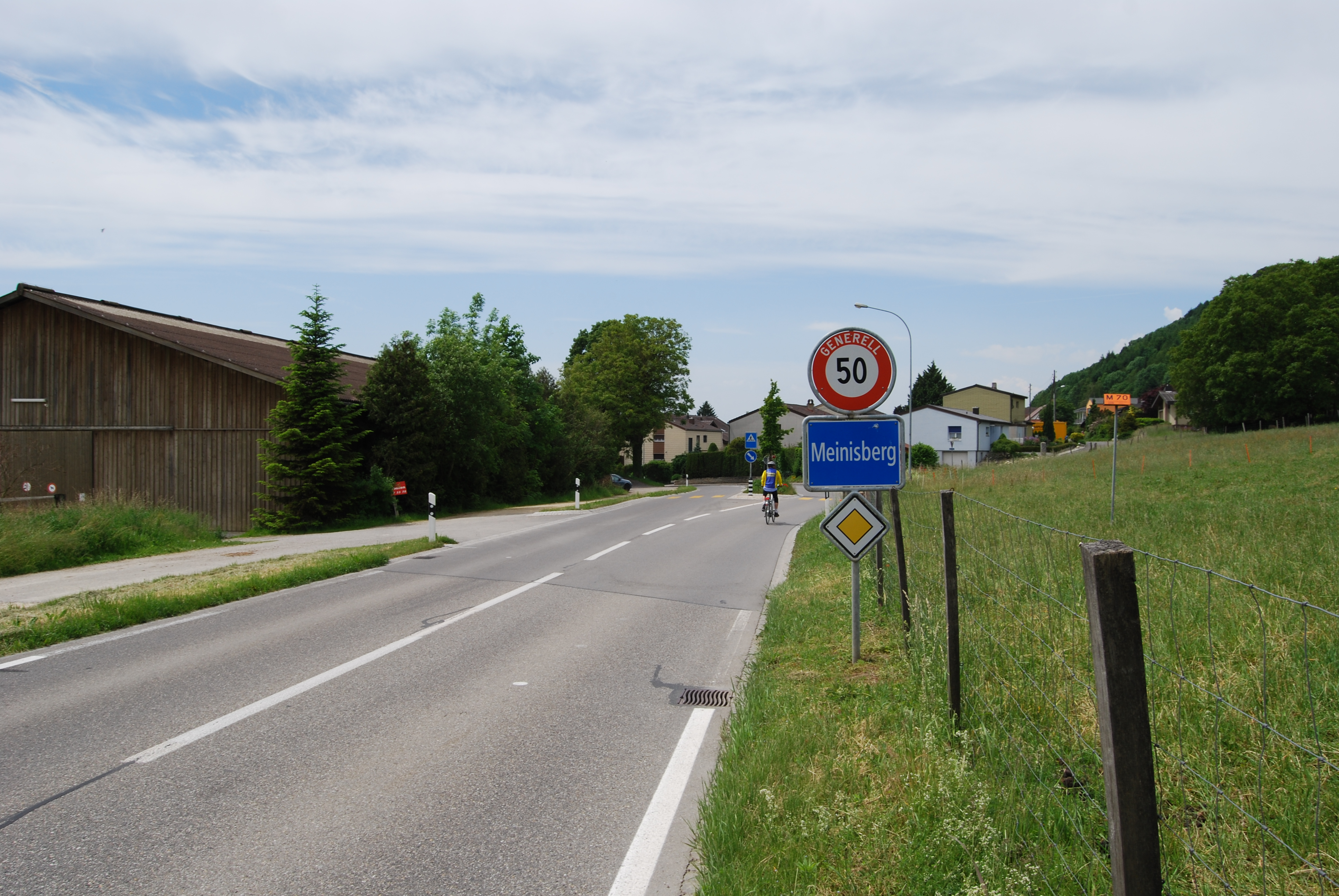
Entrance to Meinisberg village

Meinisberg has an area of 4.4 km^{2} (1.70 sq mi). Of this area, 2.41 km^{2} (0.93 mi^{2}) or 54.5% is used for agricultural purposes, while 1.11 km^{2} (0.43 mi^{2}) or 25.1% is forested. Of the rest of the land, 0.66 km^{2} (0.25 mi^{2}) or 14.9% is settled (buildings or roads), 0.23 km^{2} (0.089 mi^{2}) or 5.2% is either rivers or lakes and 0.04 km^{2} (9.9 acres) or 0.9% is unproductive land.

Of the built up area, housing and buildings made up 7.9% and transportation infrastructure made up 5.2%. Out of the forested land, all the forested land area is covered with heavy forests. Of the agricultural land, 45.5% is used for growing crops and 7.2% is pastures, while 1.8% is used for orchards or vine crops. Of the water in the municipality, 5.0% is in lakes and 0.2% is in rivers and streams.

The municipality is located at the foot of the Büttenberg mountain along the old Aare river course.

On 31 December 2009 Amtsbezirk Büren, the municipality's former district, was dissolved. On the following day, 1 January 2010, it joined the newly created Verwaltungskreis Biel/Bienne.

== Coat of arms ==
The blazon of the municipal coat of arms is Argent a Vine Vert fructed Azure proped Gules issuant from a Mount of 3 Coupeaux of the second.

== Demographics ==
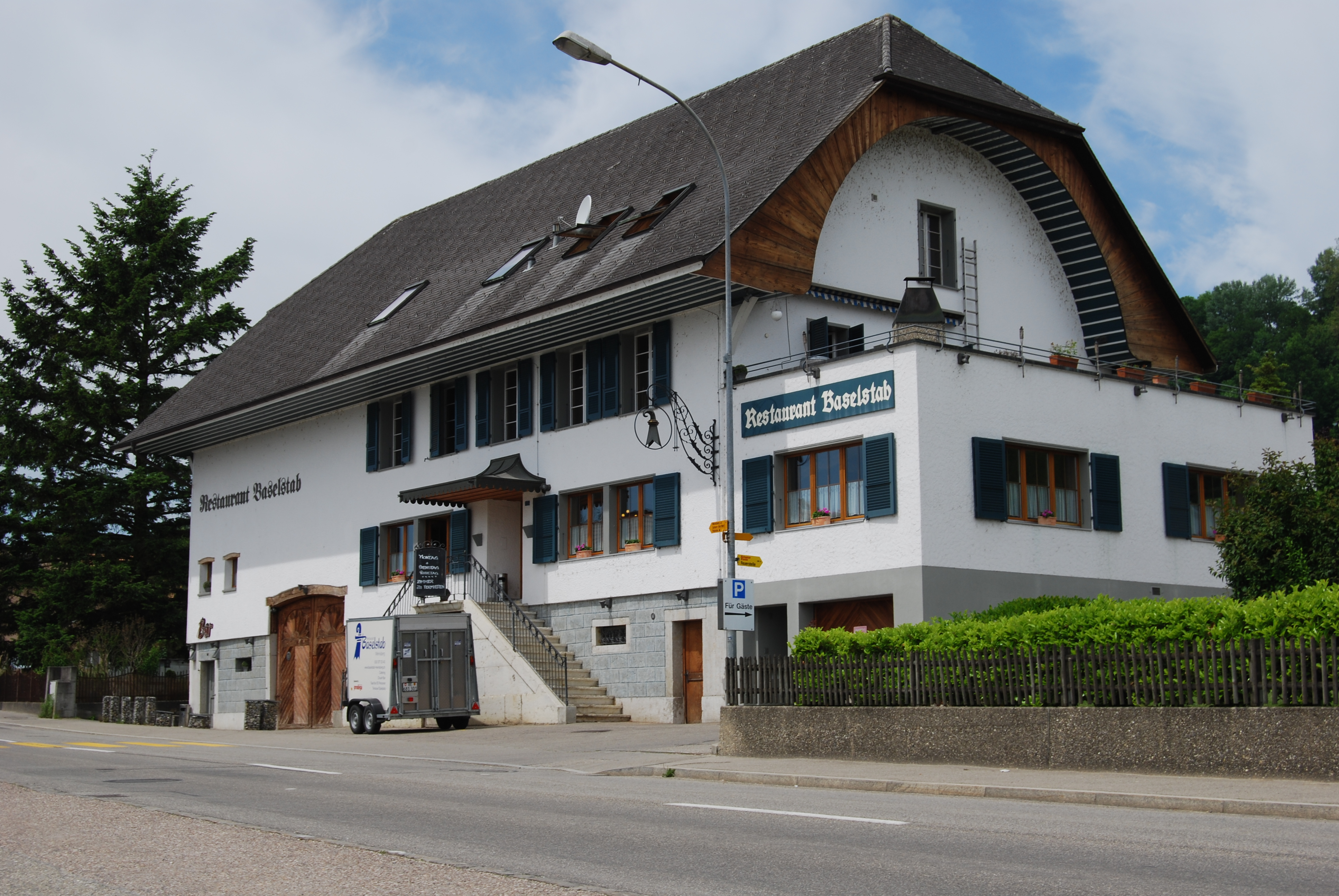
Restaurant Baselstab in Meinisberg

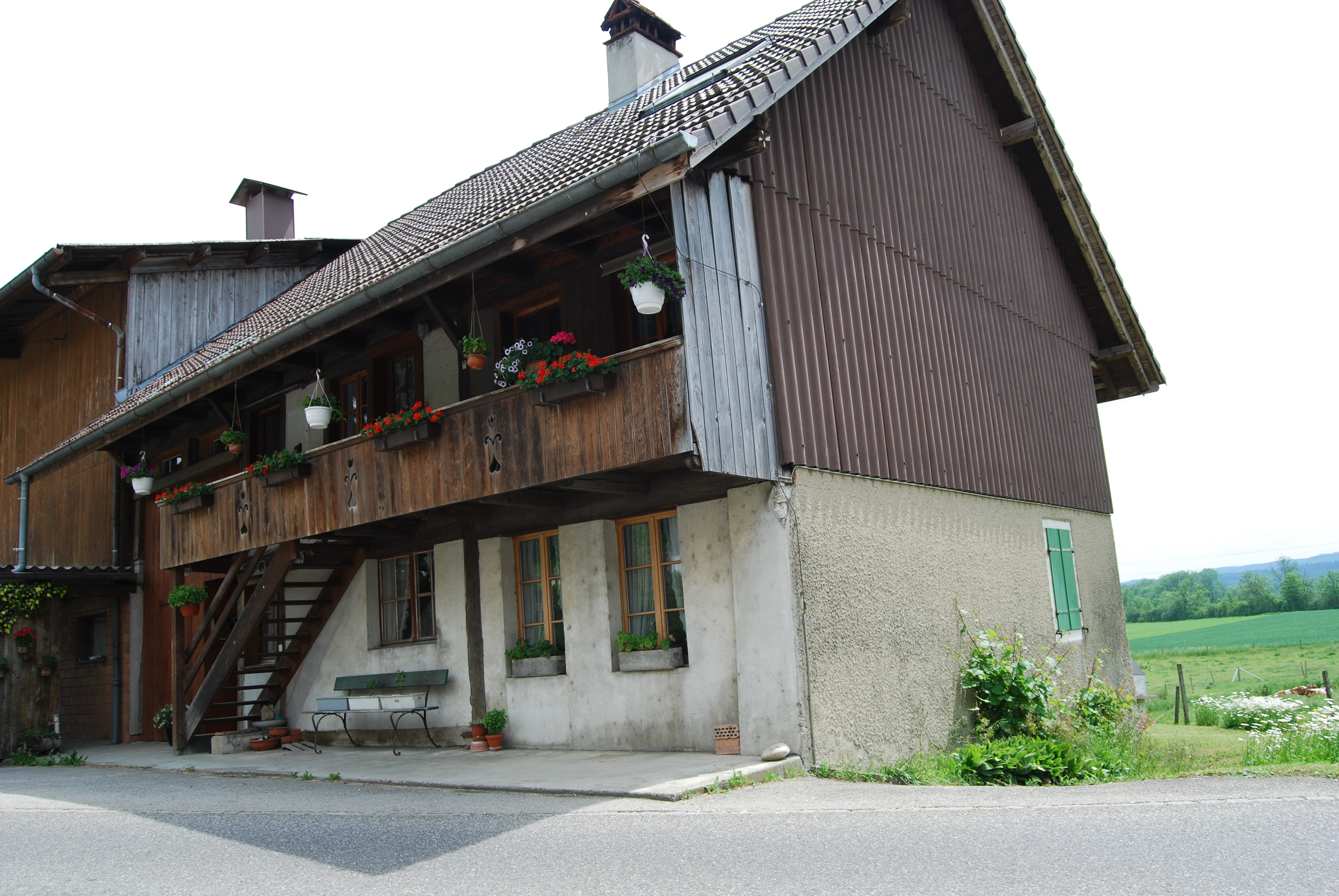
Farmhouse in Meinisberg

Meinisberg has a population (as of December 2020) of 1,326. As of 2010, 10.4% of the population are resident foreign nationals. Over the last 10 years (2000-2010) the population has changed at a rate of 6.7%. Migration accounted for 4.2%, while births and deaths accounted for 3%.

Most of the population (as of 2000) speaks German (1,070 or 90.0%) as their first language, French is the second most common (46 or 3.9%) and Albanian is the third (18 or 1.5%). There are 7 people who speak Italian.

As of 2008, the population was 50.4% male and 49.6% female. The population was made up of 564 Swiss men (44.4% of the population) and 76 (6.0%) non-Swiss men. There were 575 Swiss women (45.2%) and 5 (0.4%) non-Swiss women. Of the population in the municipality, 328 or about 27.6% were born in Meinisberg and lived there in 2000. There were 515 or 43.3% who were born in the same canton, while 190 or 16.0% were born somewhere else in Switzerland, and 127 or 10.7% were born outside of Switzerland.

As of 2010, children and teenagers (0–19 years old) make up 23% of the population, while adults (20–64 years old) make up 57.3% and seniors (over 64 years old) make up 19.7%.

As of 2000, there were 450 people who were single and never married in the municipality. There were 646 married individuals, 49 widows or widowers and 44 individuals who are divorced.

As of 2000, there were 97 households that consist of only one person and 30 households with five or more people. In 2000, a total of 460 apartments (93.7% of the total) were permanently occupied, while 15 apartments (3.1%) were seasonally occupied and 16 apartments (3.3%) were empty. As of 2010, the construction rate of new housing units was 3.9 new units per 1000 residents. The vacancy rate for the municipality, in 2011, was 1.96%.

The historical population is given in the following chart:

== Politics ==
In the 2011 federal election the most popular party was the SVP which received 32.3% of the vote. The next three most popular parties were the BDP Party (21.6%), the SPS (18.7%) and the FDP (5.9%). In the federal election, a total of 482 votes were cast, and the voter turnout was 51.9%.

== Economy ==
As of 2011, Meinisberg had an unemployment rate of 1.31%. As of 2008, there were a total of 218 people employed in the municipality. Of these, there were 26 people employed in the primary economic sector and about 11 businesses involved in this sector. 71 people were employed in the secondary sector and there were 11 businesses in this sector. 121 people were employed in the tertiary sector, with 32 businesses in this sector.

In 2008 there were a total of 179 full-time equivalent jobs. The number of jobs in the primary sector was 15, all of which were in agriculture. The number of jobs in the secondary sector was 67 of which 21 or (31.3%) were in manufacturing and 46 (68.7%) were in construction. The number of jobs in the tertiary sector was 97. In the tertiary sector; 46 or 47.4% were in wholesale or retail sales or the repair of motor vehicles, 9 or 9.3% were in the movement and storage of goods, 18 or 18.6% were in a hotel or restaurant, 3 or 3.1% were in the information industry, 6 or 6.2% were technical professionals or scientists, 7 or 7.2% were in education.

In 2000, there were 103 workers who commuted into the municipality and 537 workers who commuted away. The municipality is a net exporter of workers, with about 5.2 workers leaving the municipality for every one entering. Of the working population, 14% used public transportation to get to work, and 60.2% used a private car.

== Religion ==
From the 2000 census, 137 or 11.5% were Roman Catholic, while 820 or 69.0% belonged to the Swiss Reformed Church. Of the rest of the population, there were 15 members of an Orthodox church (or about 1.26% of the population), there were 3 individuals (or about 0.25% of the population) who belonged to the Christian Catholic Church, and there were 102 individuals (or about 8.58% of the population) who belonged to another Christian church. There were 32 (or about 2.69% of the population) who were Islamic. There were 3 individuals who were Buddhist. 86 (or about 7.23% of the population) belonged to no church, are agnostic or atheist, and 41 individuals (or about 3.45% of the population) did not answer the question.

== Education ==
In Meinisberg about 539 or (45.3%) of the population have completed non-mandatory upper secondary education, and 143 or (12.0%) have completed additional higher education (either university or a Fachhochschule). Of the 143 who completed tertiary schooling, 70.6% were Swiss men, 18.9% were Swiss women, 5.6% were non-Swiss men and 4.9% were non-Swiss women.

The Canton of Bern school system provides one year of non-obligatory Kindergarten, followed by six years of Primary school. This is followed by three years of obligatory lower Secondary school where the students are separated according to ability and aptitude. Following the lower Secondary students may attend additional schooling or they may enter an apprenticeship.

During the 2009-10 school year, there were a total of 117 students attending classes in Meinisberg. There were 2 kindergarten classes with a total of 29 students in the municipality. Of the kindergarten students, and 13.8% have a different mother language than the classroom language. The municipality had 4 primary classes and 88 students. Of the primary students, 14.8% were permanent or temporary residents of Switzerland (not citizens) and 15.9% have a different mother language than the classroom language.

As of 2000, there were 5 students in Meinisberg who came from another municipality, while 73 residents attended schools outside the municipality.
