= Grenchenberg Tunnel =

Railway tunnel in Switzerland

Grenchenberg Tunnel, Mont-de-Granges tunnel or Grenchenbergtunnel is a railway tunnel built between 1911 and 1915 connecting the town of Grenchen (SO) to Moutier (currently still in the Bernese Jura).

This rail link is of considerable importance since it is a passage from the Swiss plateau to the geographical Jura and Basel (Rhine town representing one of the strategic centers of the cross-border alliance "RegioTriRhena").

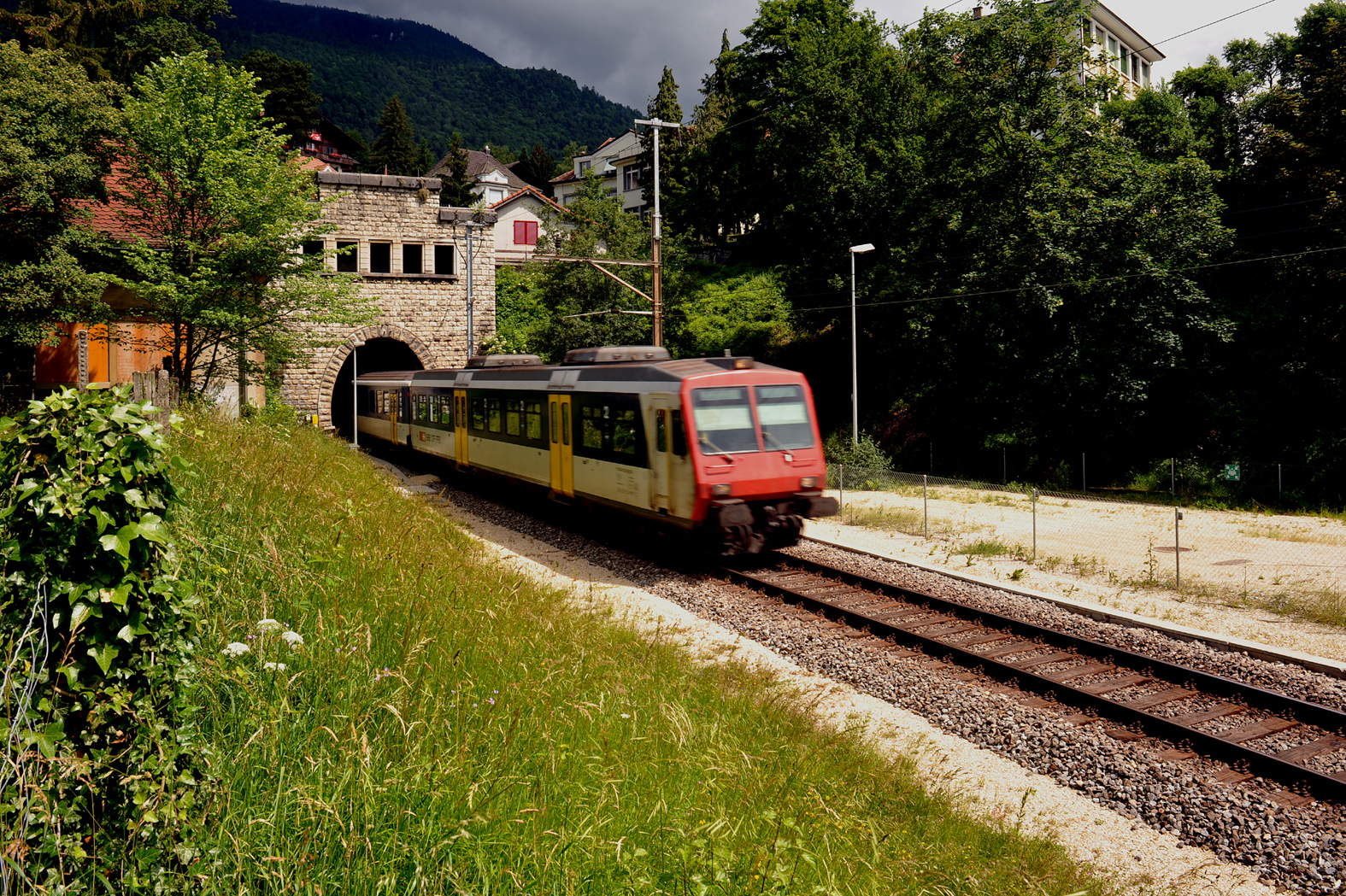
RBDe 560 (Domino) entering the Tunnel at Grenchen

France having lost Alsace in 1871, international trains connecting France to Switzerland and Italy then took the Belfort-Berne axis, passing through Porrentruy, Delémont and Moutier. This tunnel should make it easier for them to reach the Swiss plateau. The French government contributed 10 million Swiss francs at the total cost of 26 million Swiss francs.

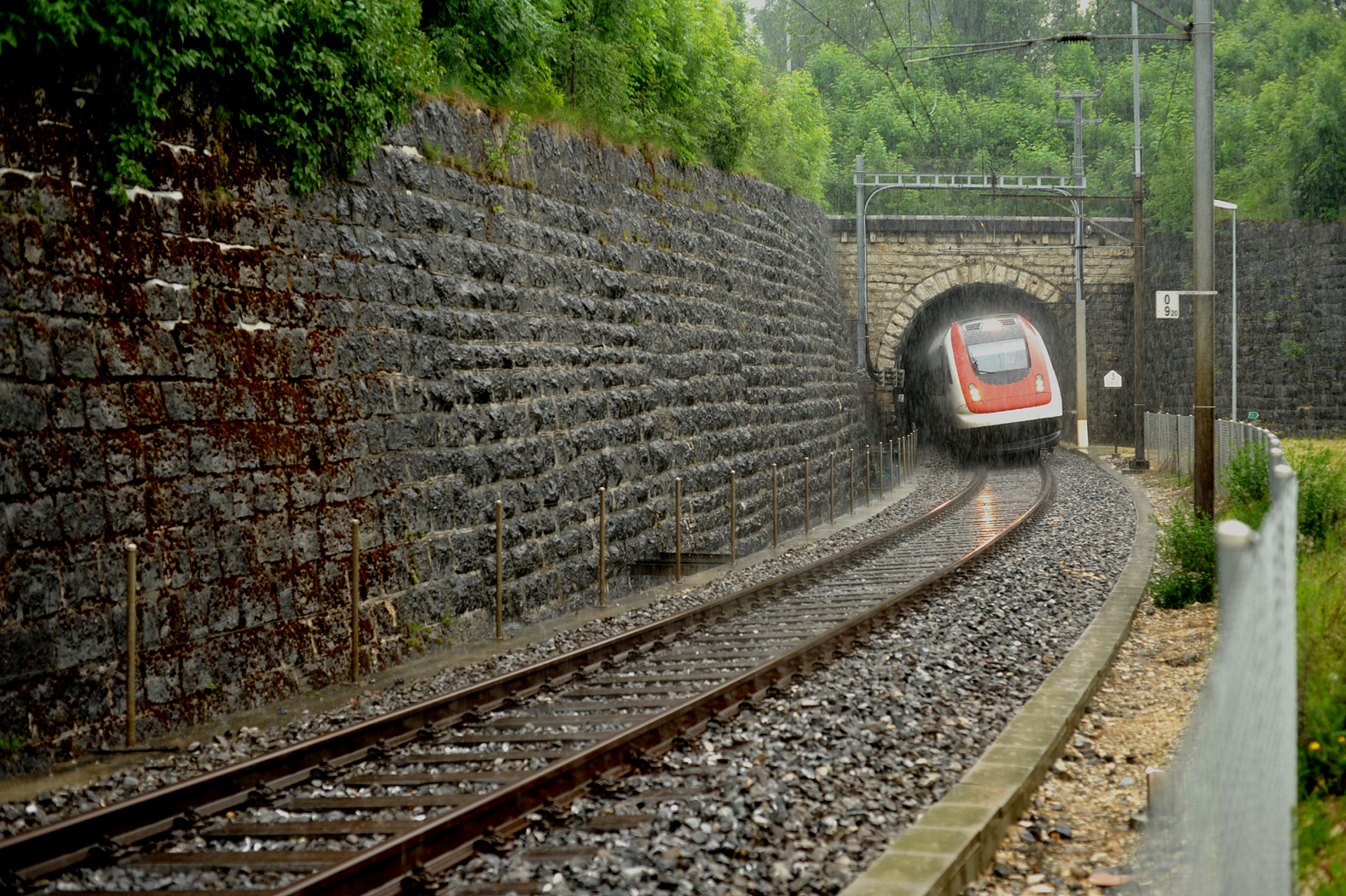
RABDe 500 (ICN) leaving the Tunnel at Moutier

From 2003 to 2008, the tunnel was refurbished.

== Characteristics ==
- Tunnel length: 8,578 m (5.330 mi; 9,381 yd)
- Length of the Moutier-Lengnau line: 13 km (8 mi)
- Owner of the Moutier-Lengnau line: BLS
