= Biel/Bienne railway station =

Railway station in Biel/Bienne, Canton of Bern, Switzerland

Biel/Bienne
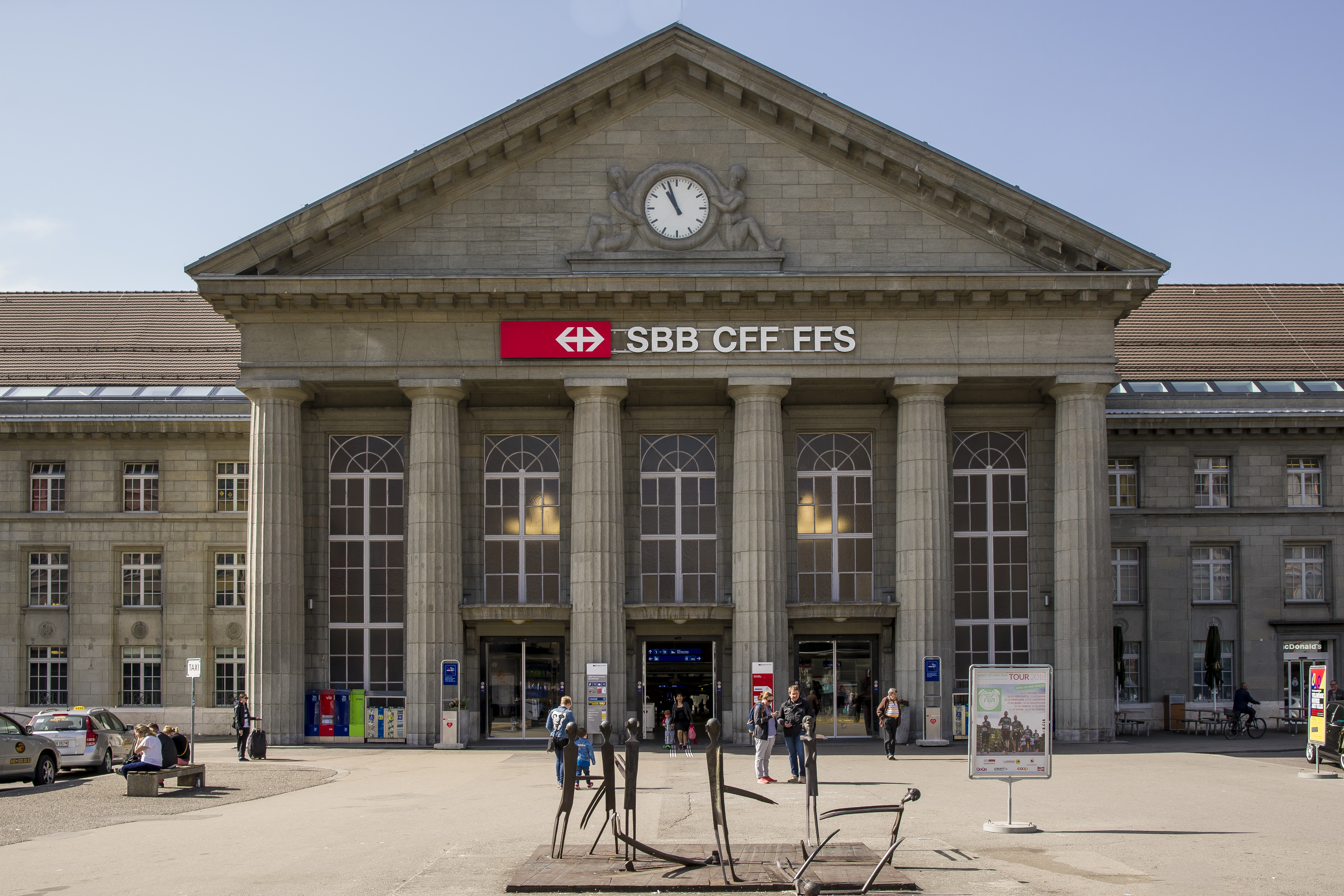
- The main entrance to the station on the northern side

General information
- Location: Bahnhofplatz; Biel/Bienne; Switzerland
- Coordinates: 47°07′58″N 7°14′35″E
- Elevation: 437 m (1,434 ft)
- Owner: Swiss Federal Railways
- Lines: Basel–Biel/Bienne line; Biel/Bienne–Bern line; Biel/Bienne–La Chaux-de-Fonds line; Biel–Täuffelen–Ins line; Jura Foot line
- Platforms: 10: 2 side platforms; 4 island platforms
- Tracks: 12
- Train operators: Aare Seeland mobil; BLS AG; Swiss Federal Railways
- Connections: PostAuto AG/CarPostal SA buses; Biel/Bienne trolleybuses (VB/Tpb); BSG ships

Construction
- Platform levels: 2
- Parking: Yes (140 spaces)
- Accessible: Yes
- Architect: Moser und Schürch (1923); Johann Jenzer (1864); Karl Etzel and Ludwig Maring (1857)

Other information
- Station code: 8504300 (BI)
- Fare zone: libero: 300
- Website: Welcome to Biel/Bienne station.

History
- Opened: 1923 (1859 at different location)

Passengers
- 2025: 48,400 per day (BLS, SBB)
- Rank: 13 out of 1,095

Services
Preceding station	SBB CFF FFS	Following station
Neuchâtel towards Lausanne	IC 5	Grenchen Süd towards Rorschach
Neuchâtel towards Lausanne	IC 51	Grenchen Nord towards Basel SBB
Terminus	IR 55	Grenchen Süd towards Zürich HB
Sonceboz-Sombeval towards La Chaux-de-Fonds	RE4	Terminus
Frinvillier-Taubenloch towards La Chaux-de-Fonds or Moutier	R41	Terminus
Tüscherz towards Yverdon-les-Bains	R13	Terminus
Tüscherz towards Neuchâtel	R16	Terminus
Terminus	S20	Biel Mett towards Olten
Preceding station	BLS	Following station
Terminus	IR 56	Grenchen Nord towards Basel SBB
Terminus	IR 65	Lyss towards Bern
Terminus	RE11 Weekends only	Lyss towards Brig
Preceding station	Aare Seeland mobil	Following station
Nidau towards Ins	S37	Terminus
Preceding station	Bern S-Bahn	Following station
Terminus	S3	Brügg BE towards Belp
Terminus	S31	Lyss towards Belp
Location
- Location within Switzerland Location within Canton of Bern

Biel/Bienne railway station (German: Bahnhof Biel; French: Gare de Bienne) serves the bilingual municipality of Biel/Bienne, in the canton of Bern, Switzerland.

It is a major railway junction on the Swiss railways network. It lies on one of the two busiest major railway lines between the northeastern (St. Gallen/Zürich) and southwestern Switzerland (Geneva); the other goes via Bern. An InterCity between St. Gallen and Genève-Aéroport only takes 3:58h with one of its tilting train compositions (in 2024). The other major line is between Basel and Lausanne/Geneva; via Delémont it also connects the canton of Jura with the Swiss railway network. And third, it also connects the French-speaking part of canton of Bern (the Bernese Jura) and La Chaux-de-Fonds (NE) in the west with Bern in the east.

All trains of these lines meet in Biel/Bienne at a quarter after and a quarter before o'clock in a half an hour frequency according to the Swiss-wide applied clock-face scheduling, so that seamless changes of just a few (2–5) minutes between trains of all these lines are easily possible.

It is located in the center of Biel/Bienne and is therefore part of the fare zone 300 of the libero fare network.

Biel/Bienne's railway station is the twelfth busiest station in Switzerland with 50,800 passengers per working day (in 2023).

== Services ==
=== Long-distance ===
The following long-distance trains call at Biel/Bienne:

- InterCity / InterRegio: half-hourly service to Lausanne, Zürich Hauptbahnhof, and Basel SBB; hourly service to Rorschach.
- InterRegio: half-hourly service over the Biel/Bienne–Bern line to Bern.

=== Regional ===
The following regional trains call at Biel/Bienne:

- RegioExpress:
  - hourly service over the Biel/Bienne–La Chaux-de-Fonds line to La Chaux-de-Fonds.
  - daily service over the Biel/Bienne–Bern line on weekends during the high season to Brig.
- Regio:
  - hourly service to Yverdon-les-Bains.
  - hourly service to Neuchâtel at various times during the day.
  - hourly service over the Biel/Bienne–La Chaux-de-Fonds line to La Chaux-de-Fonds and Moutier via Sonceboz-Sombeval.

=== S-Bahn ===
The following Bern S-Bahn trains call at Biel/Bienne:

- S3: half-hourly service over the Biel/Bienne–Bern line to Belp.
- S20: half-hourly service to Solothurn, with every other train continuing from Solothurn to Olten.
- S31: rush-hour service over the Biel/Bienne–Bern line to Belp.
- S37: half-hourly service over the Biel–Täuffelen–Ins line to Ins.

== See also ==
- History of rail transport in Switzerland
- Rail transport in Switzerland

== Notes ==
- Boss, Paul (1997). Das war der alte Bahnhof [That was the old Station] (in German). Bern: Benteli Verlag. OCLC 603800392.
- Stutz, Werner (1976). Bahnhöfe der Schweiz [Railway Stations of Switzerland] (in German). Zürich: Verlag Berichthaus. p. 162. ISBN 3-85572-018-5.
