= Grenchen Nord railway station =

Railway station in Grenchen, Switzerland

Grenchen Nord
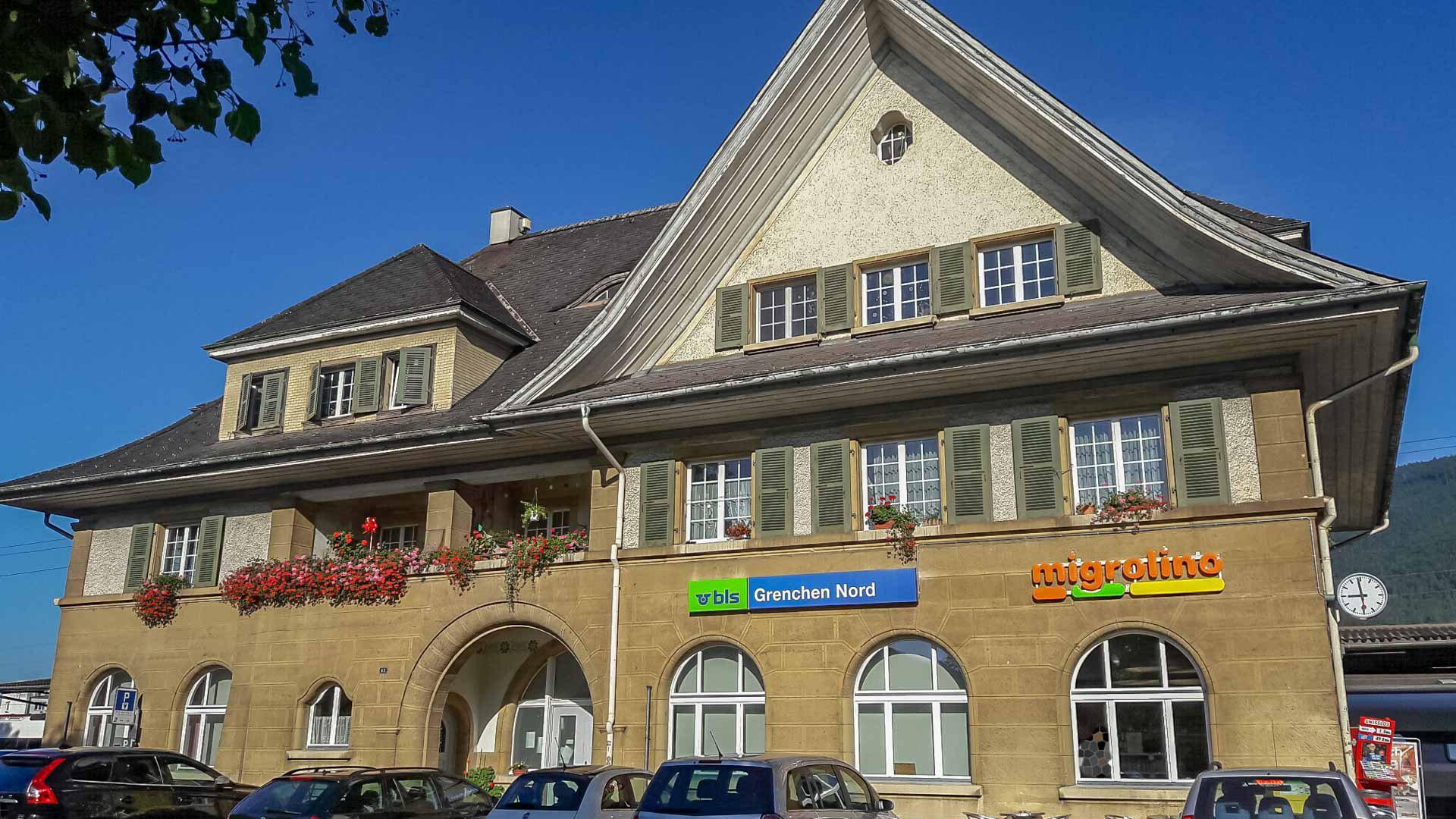
- The station building in 2017

General information
- Location: Nordbahnhofstrasse; Grenchen; Switzerland
- Coordinates: 47°11′N 7°23′E
- Elevation: 467 m (1,532 ft)
- Owner: BLS AG
- Line: Basel–Biel/Bienne line
- Distance: 10.7 km (6.6 mi) from Moutier
- Platforms: 3
- Tracks: 5
- Train operators: BLS AG; Swiss Federal Railways
- Connections: BGU

Construction
- Accessible: Yes

Other information
- Station code: 8500159 (GN)
- Fare zone: 250 (Libero)

Passengers
- 2023: 2'200 per weekday (SBB)

Services
Preceding station	SBB CFF FFS	Following station
Biel/Bienne towards Lausanne	IC 51	Moutier towards Basel SBB
Preceding station	BLS	Following station
Biel/Bienne Terminus	IR 56	Moutier towards Basel SBB
Location
- Location within Switzerland Location within Canton of Solothurn

Grenchen Nord railway station (German: Bahnhof Grenchen Nord) is a railway station in the municipality of Grenchen, in the Swiss canton of Solothurn. It is an intermediate stop on the Basel–Biel/Bienne line and is served by regional and long-distance trains. The station is located west of Grenchen's city center, approximately 1 kilometre (0.62 mi) from Grenchen Süd railway station on the Jura Foot line.

== Services ==
As of the December 2025 timetable change, the following services stop at Grenchen Nord:

- InterCity / InterRegio: half-hourly service between Biel/Bienne and Basel SBB and hourly service to Lausanne.

== Gallery ==
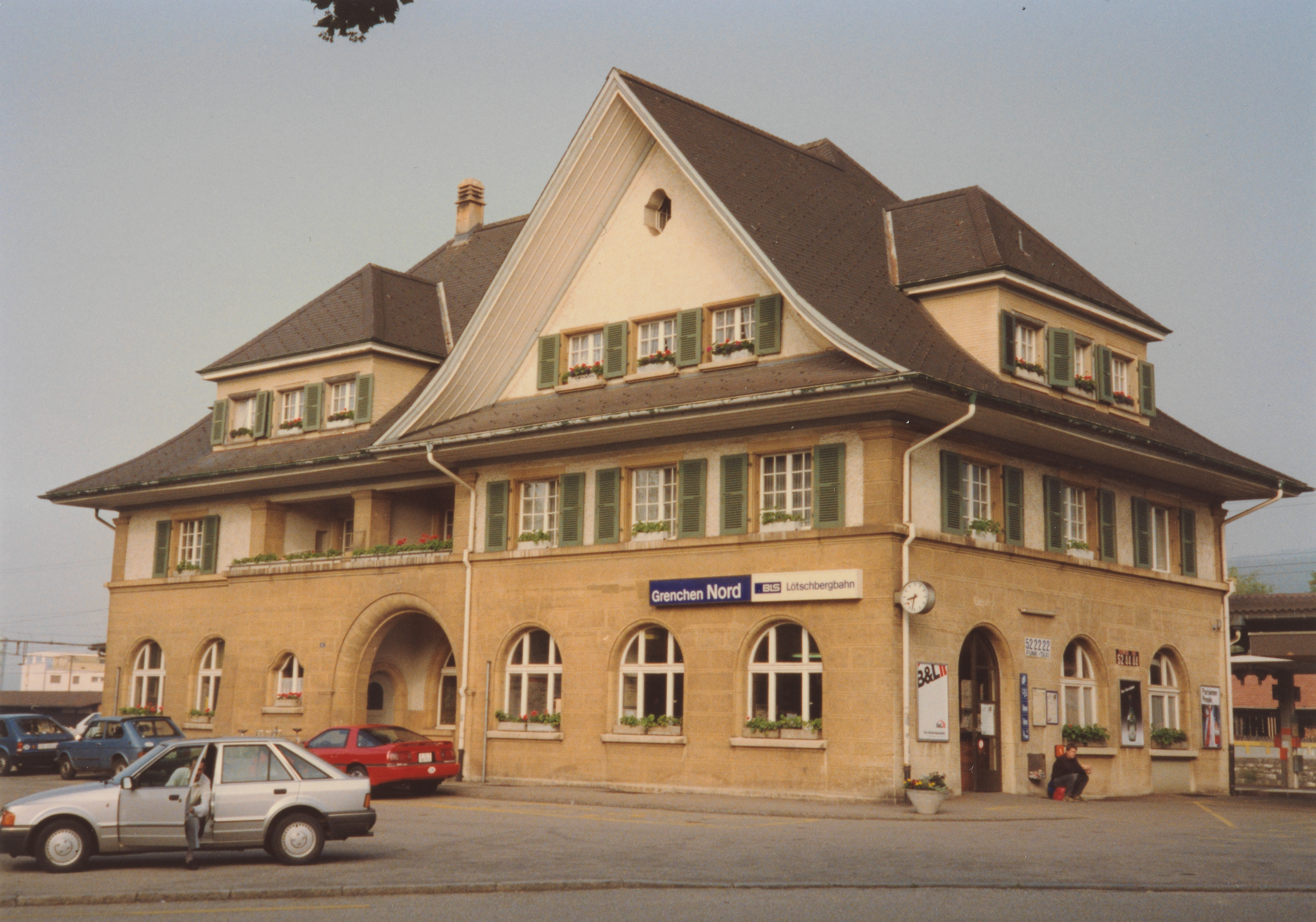
Station building, street-side (1990)

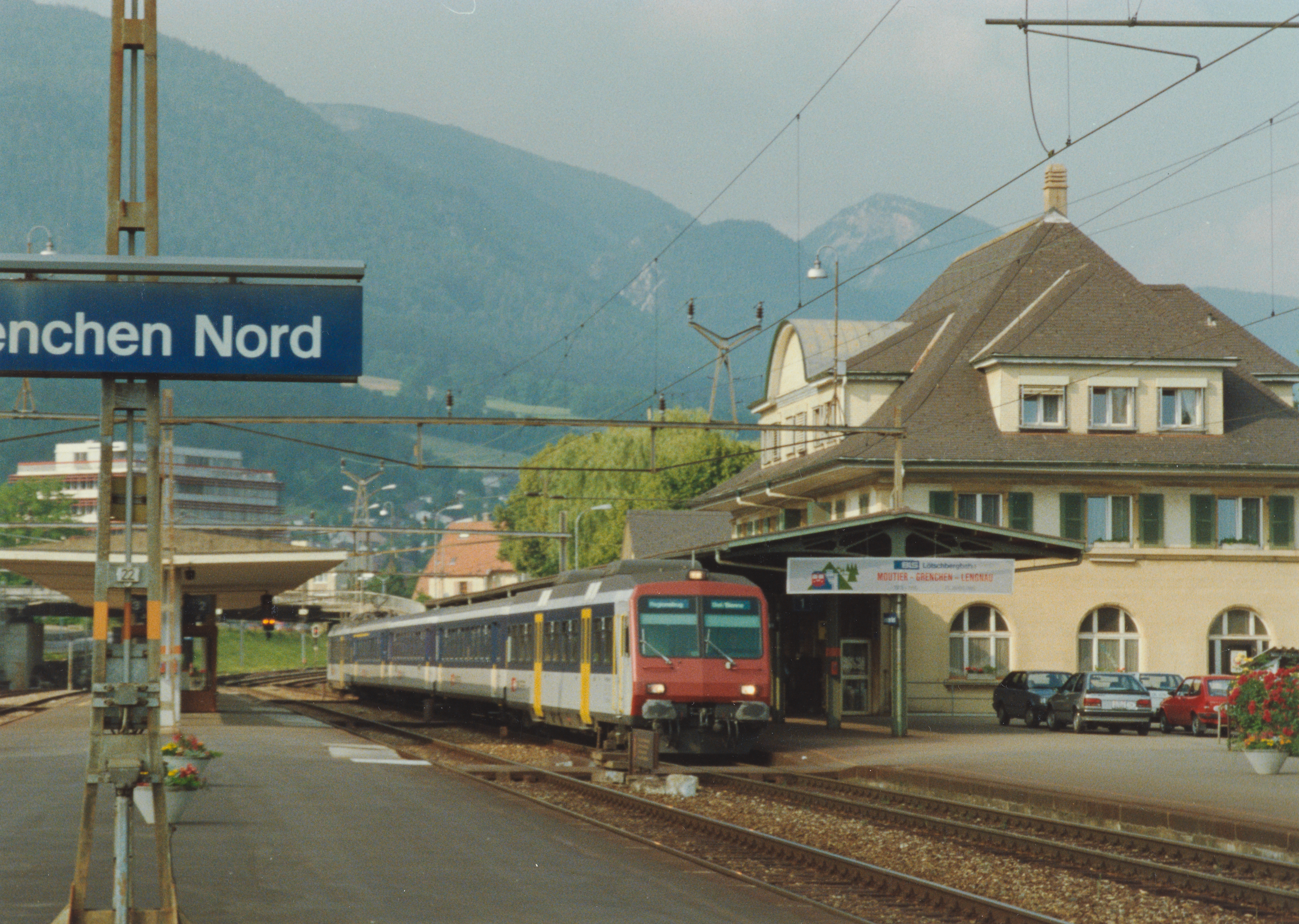
Platforms and station building (undated)

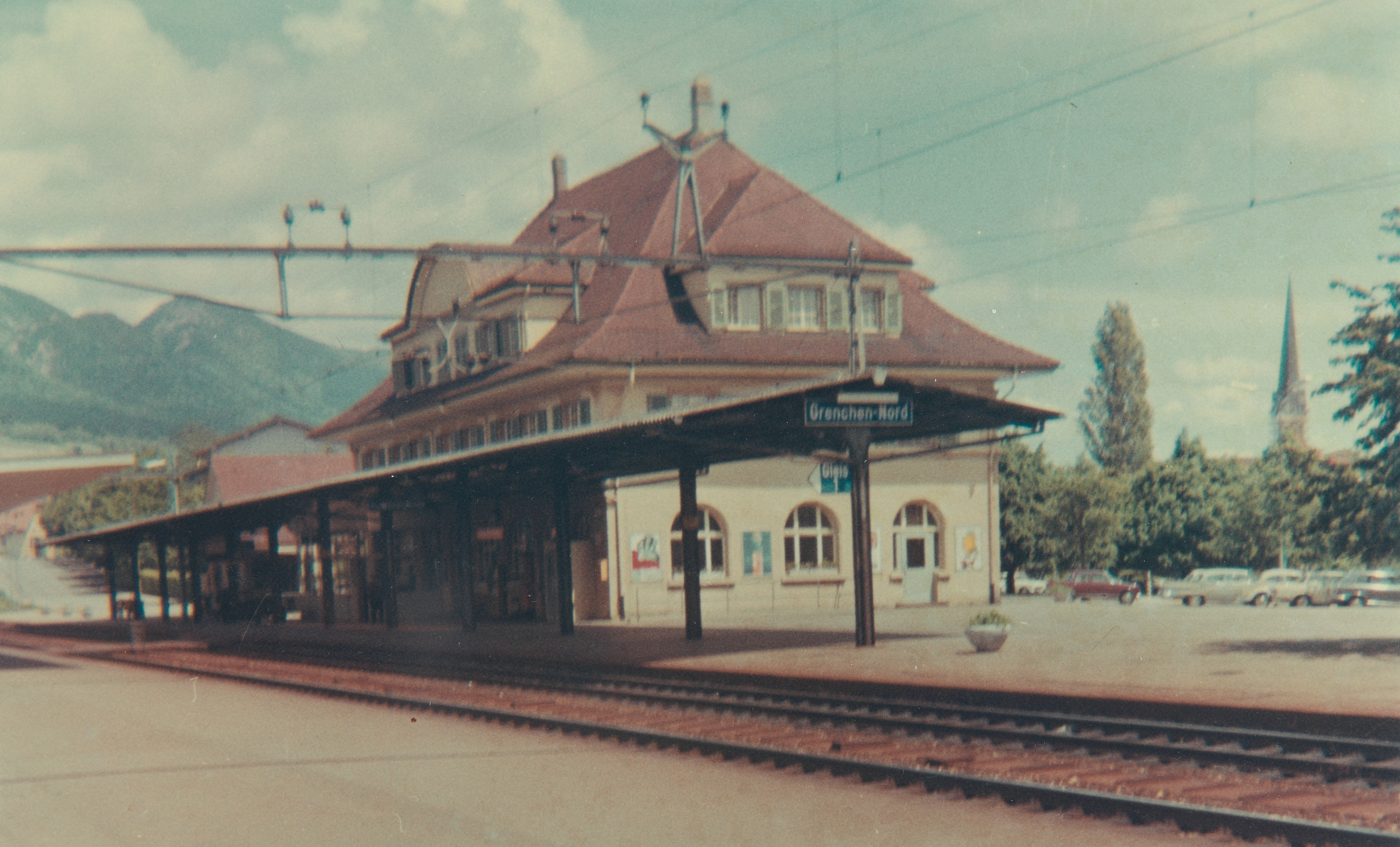
Platforms and station building (undated)
