= Basel–Biel/Bienne railway line =

Railway line in Switzerland

Basel–Biel/Bienne
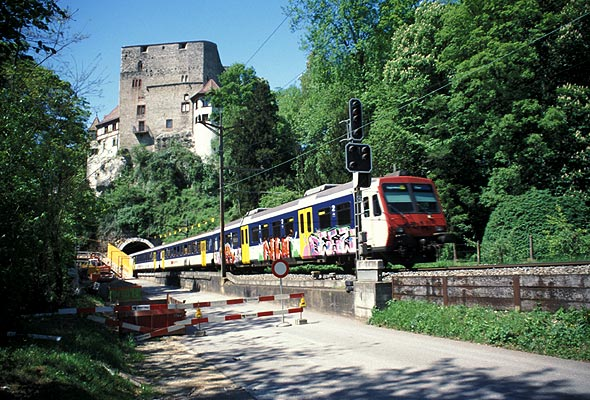
- Basel–Biel/Bienne railway

Overview
- Native name: Jurabahn
- Owner: Swiss Federal Railways; BLS
- Line number: 230
- Termini: Basel SBB; Biel/Bienne

Technical
- Line length: 71 km (44 mi)
- Number of tracks: 1 or 2
- Track gauge: 1,435 mm (4 ft 8 1/2 in)
- Electrification: 15 kV 16.7 Hz AC overhead catenary

The Basel–Biel/Bienne railway line (also known in German as the Jurabahn—Jura Railway) is a standard gauge railway line of the Swiss Federal Railways (SBB) and the BLS AG. It runs from Basel SBB along the Birs in the French-speaking Jura to Delémont and Biel/Bienne. The traffic on the line is shown in table 230 of the official timetable.

== History ==
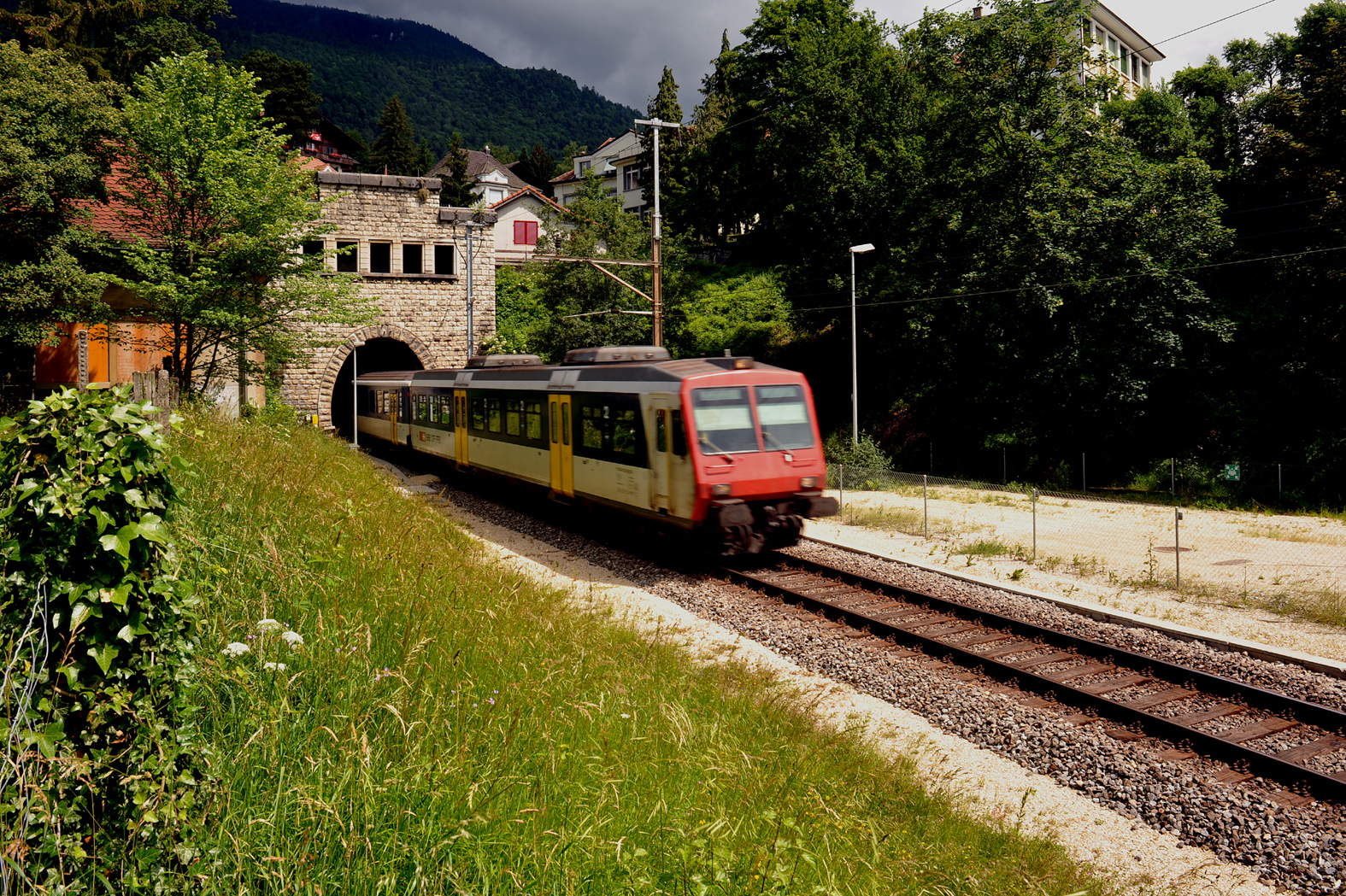
South portal of the Grenchenberg Tunnel in Grenchen

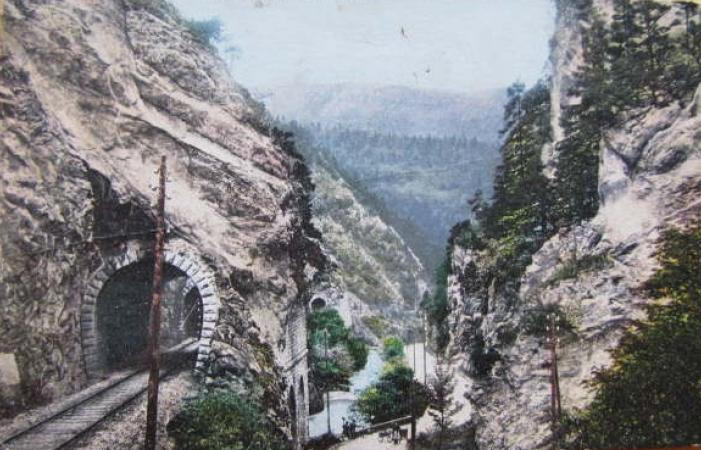
The passage through the rocks between Roches and Moutier before the electrification of the line

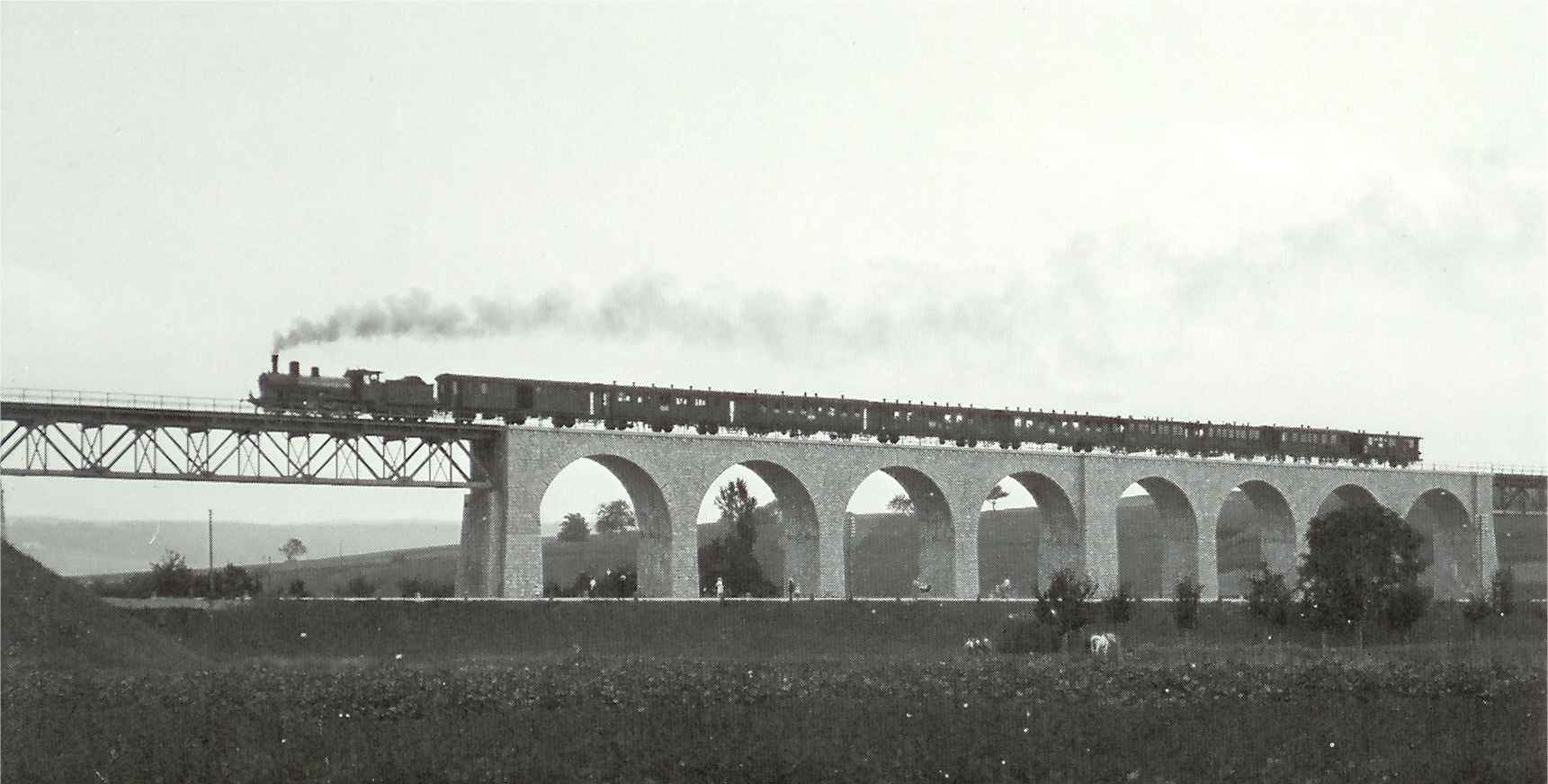
Historical photograph of the Mösli viaduct of the Moutier–Lengnau section

The line was built in several sections by the Chemins de fer du Jura bernois (French for "Bernese Jura Railway", JB) and formed the main line of the company, which operated in the Bernese Jura. The Biel–Sonceboz–Tavannes line (which has since been bypassed; part of it now forms part of the Sonceboz-Sombeval–Moutier railway) and the Sonceboz–Convers branch line (which forms part of the line to La Chaux-de-Fonds) opened on 30 April 1874. The opening of the Basel–Delémont line followed on 23 September 1875. The gap between Tavannes and Delémont was further reduced on 16 December 1876 with the opening of the Tavannes–Court and Moutier–Delémont sections. A continuous connection from Biel to Basel was finally opened on 24 May 1877, with the commissioning of the Court–Moutier section.

The route as described above was the shortest railway connection from Basel to Biel until the opening of the Grenchenberg Tunnel in 1915. During the run up to the First World War, the northernmost rail link between Switzerland and France ran via Delle, using the Basel–Delémont section of the Jura Railway, the Delémont–Delle railway, the Belfort–Delle railway and the remaining part of Compagnie de l'Est's Paris–Mulhouse railway that had not have been ceded to the German Empire with Alsace in 1871.

The so-called Münster-Lengnau-Bahn (Moutier–Lengnau railway, MLB) was built to shorten the Delémont–Biel line and thus also the travel time from Biel to both Basel and Belfort. The approximately 13-kilometre (8.1 mi)-long line consists essentially of the almost 8.6-kilometre (5.3 mi)-long, single-track Grenchenberg Tunnel. The Berner Alpenbahn-Gesellschaft Bern–Lötschberg–Simplon (Bernese Alpine Railway Company Bern-Lötschberg-Simplon) built the MLB to improve access to its Lötschberg line. While the track is owned by the BLS, the SBB has operated trains on it since its opening in 1915.

After the Second World War, the SNCF upgraded the Belfort–Mulhouse–Basel line, so that the line via Delle was reduced to a regional branch line. The Belfort–Delle line was closed to passenger traffic in 1992 and the Boncourt–Delle cross-border section followed in 1996. As part of the construction of the LGV Rhin-Rhône, the French section was reactivated as a feeder line in December 2018; the Boncourt–Delle section was reopened in December 2006 for symbolic reasons.

== Accidents ==
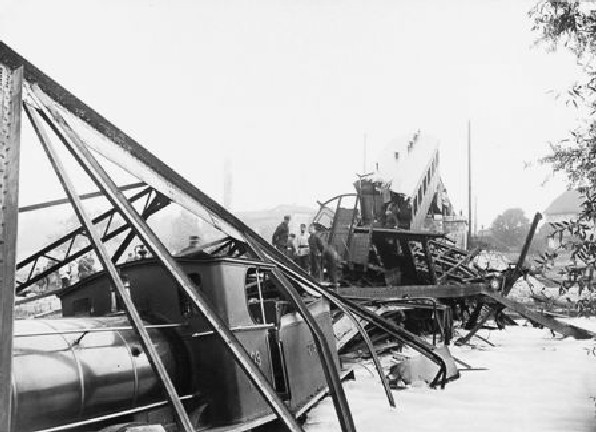
Bridge collapse in Münchenstein, 1891

Switzerland's worst railway disaster to date occurred on 14 June 1891: the railway bridge over the Birs, which was built by Gustave Eiffel, collapsed below the village of Münchenstein under a train from Basel. Three carriages and the two locomotives crashed into the flooded Birs. 78 people were killed and 131 were injured. The cause of the disaster was poor maintenance of the bridge and the buckling of a strut that was inadequate for increasingly heavy trains.

On 26 March 1974, the Cerbère–Geneva–Basel–Hamburg express train in Choindez passed over a set of points, where the first bogie of the dining car was steered to the left and the second to the right track of the double tracks. The dining car rolled on for a kilometer on both tracks and passed the short double-track Choindez I tunnel. In the parallel single-track Choindez II and III tunnels, the dining car crashed against the rock between the tunnels, resulting in the death of two German nationals and a Swiss and injuries to 27 people.

== Route ==
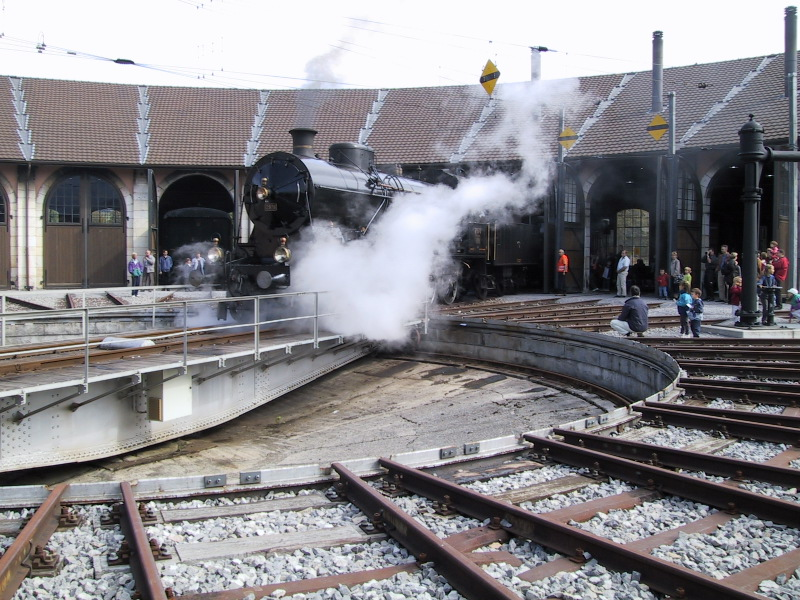
Delémont roundhouse with C 5/6 steam locomotive 2978

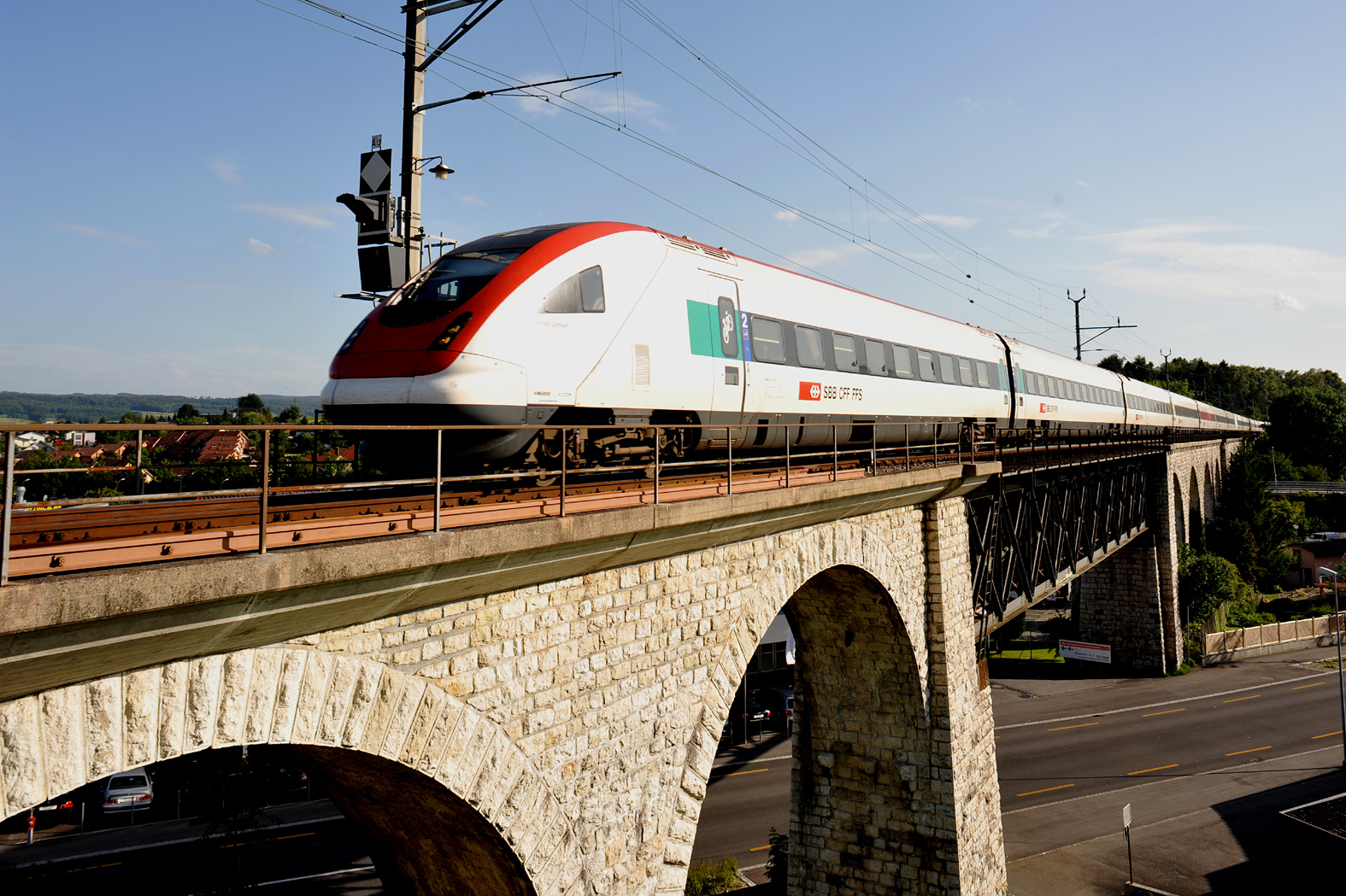
ICN on the Moslivi Viaduct near Grenchen

From Basel, the line runs past the Wolf freight yard and in the Birseck area through the suburbs of Münchenstein, Arlesheim, Dornach and Aesch. Here, the railway passes under Angenstein Castle through a short tunnel. The railway meanders along the Birs southwest to Grellingen. During the First and Second World War, the two railway bridges over the Birs in the Chessiloch area were guarded by Swiss Army troops. The crests of the regiments and inscriptions that were carved into the rock walls by the soldiers still exist. Running through the widening Laufen valley, the line passes through Laufen and Liesberg to reach Delémont, the capital of the French-speaking Canton of Jura.

The historic Delémont roundhouse is located in Delémont. This former locomotive depot/roundhouse with a turntable is now the home of the Historische Eisenbahn Gesellschaft (Historical Railway Company, HEG), which focuses on the rescue, restoration and operation of historic Swiss rolling stock. The Delémont–Delle railway branches off at the station, passing through Porrentruy and Boncourt. It has been served hourly by the S3 service of the Regio S-Bahn Basel since December 2004.

Trains must reverse in the station to continue towards Biel. After leaving the plain of Delémont, the line reaches Courrendlin and from there passes through the cliffs at Choindez and Roches. The line passes through a canyon that is typical for the Jura, having numerous short rock outcroppings. There are nine of them on the two-kilometre section between Roches and Moutier. The longest tunnel is 60 metres long, while the shortest is only seven metres long. The station of Moutier is also reached from the same side by the Solothurn–Moutier railway of the Solothurn-Münster-Bahn (SMB), now part of the BLS.

Moutier station connects in the same direction with both the original Jura Railway, which runs to Biel via Tavannes and Sonceboz, and the newer Moutier–Lengnau railway (MLB), which runs to Biel via Grenchen. South of Moutier the trains on the MLB route run through the 8,578 metre-long Grenchenberg Tunnel, after which Grenchen Nord station is reached. The MLB line joins the Olten–Solothurn–Biel line in Lengnau—part of the so-called Jura Foot Railway of the SBB—and uses it to Biel.
