= Corcelles BE railway station =

Railway station in Corcelles, Switzerland

Corcelles BE
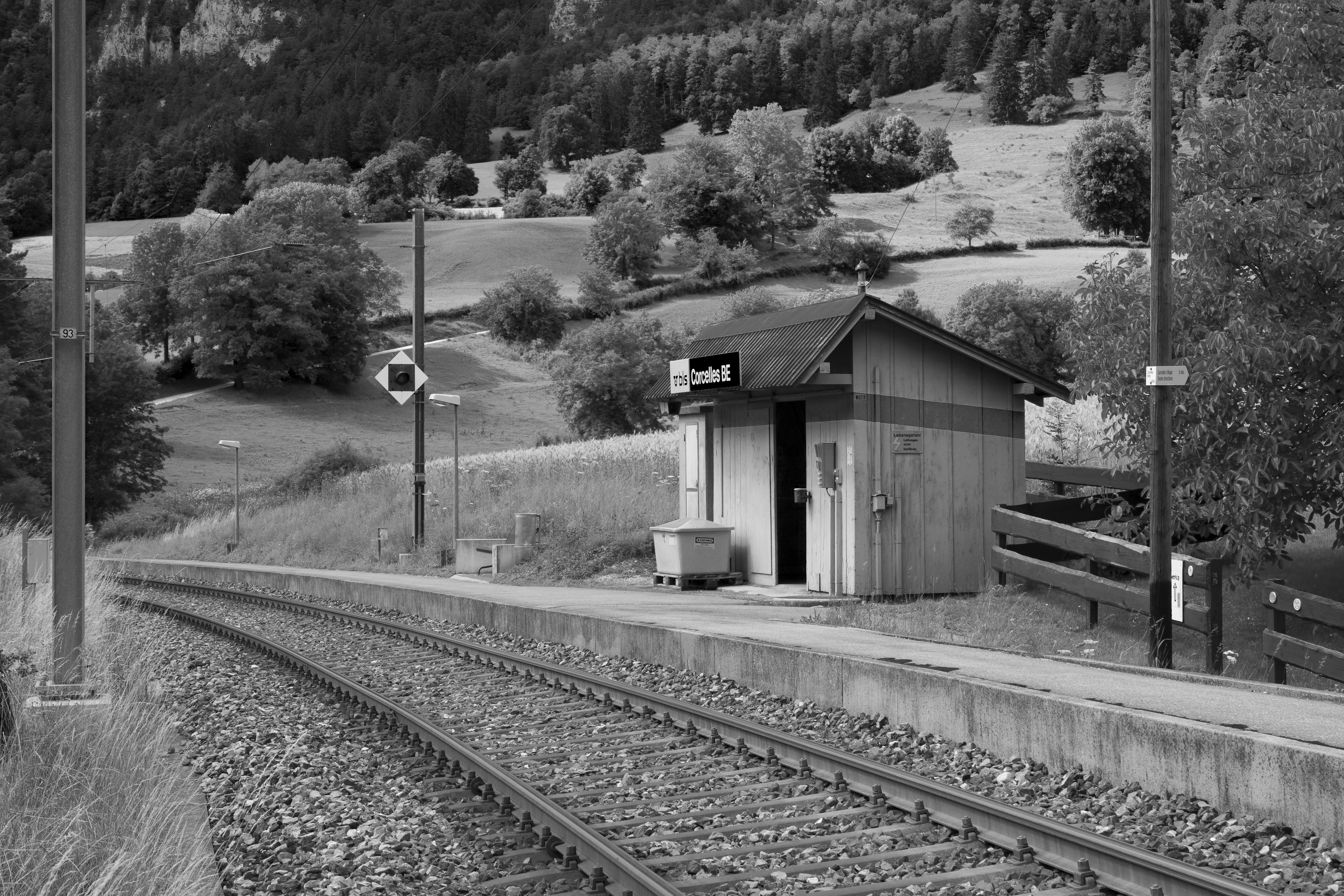
- The station in 2008

General information
- Location: Corcelles; Switzerland
- Coordinates: 47°17′10″N 7°27′00″E
- Elevation: 645 m (2,116 ft)
- Owner: BLS AG
- Line: Solothurn–Moutier line
- Distance: 16.6 km (10.3 mi) from Solothurn West
- Platforms: 1
- Tracks: 1
- Train operators: Swiss Federal Railways

Construction
- Accessible: No

Other information
- Station code: 8500266 (CORC)
- Fare zone: 345 (Libero)

Passengers
- 2023: Fewer than 50 persons per day (SBB)
Location

Corcelles BE railway station (French: Gare de Corcelles BE) is a railway station in the municipality of Corcelles, in the Swiss canton of Bern. It is an intermediate stop on the standard gauge Solothurn–Moutier line of BLS AG and is served by local trains only.

== History ==
Between Spring 2024 and March 2026, the Weissenstein Tunnel is getting a renovation and remains closed. The BLS is using the tunnel closure to renovate the whole of the line. This station will be modernized to permit barrier-free boarding. Replacement buses are running between Gänsbrunnen and Moutier during the construction work.
