= Crémines railway station =

Railway station in Crémines, Switzerland

Crémines
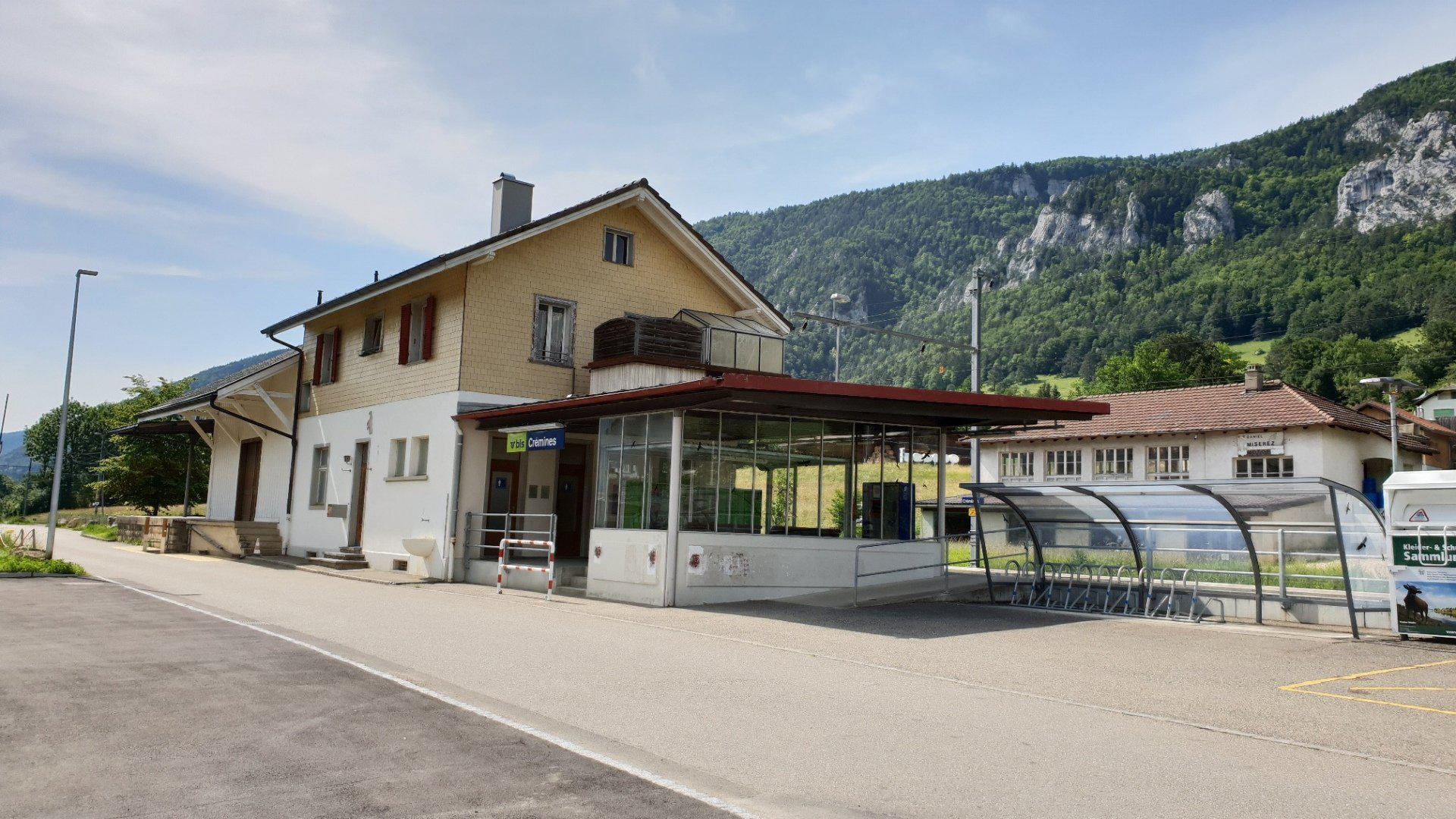
- The station building in 2018

General information
- Location: Crémines; Switzerland
- Coordinates: 47°17′10″N 7°26′06″E
- Elevation: 624 m (2,047 ft)
- Owner: BLS AG
- Line: Solothurn–Moutier line
- Distance: 17.8 km (11.1 mi) from Solothurn West
- Platforms: 2
- Tracks: 2
- Train operators: Swiss Federal Railways

Construction
- Parking: Yes (6 spaces)
- Accessible: Yes

Other information
- Station code: 8500267 (CREM)
- Fare zone: 345 (Libero)

Passengers
- 2023: 130 per weekday (SBB)
Location

Crémines railway station (French: Gare de Crémines) is a railway station in the municipality of Crémines, in the Swiss canton of Bern. It is an intermediate stop on the standard gauge Solothurn–Moutier line of BLS AG and is served by local trains only.

== History ==
Between Spring 2024 and March 2026, the Weissenstein Tunnel is getting a renovation and remains closed. The BLS is using the tunnel closure to renovate the whole of the line. Replacement buses are running between Gänsbrunnen and Moutier during the construction work.
