= Weissenstein Tunnel =

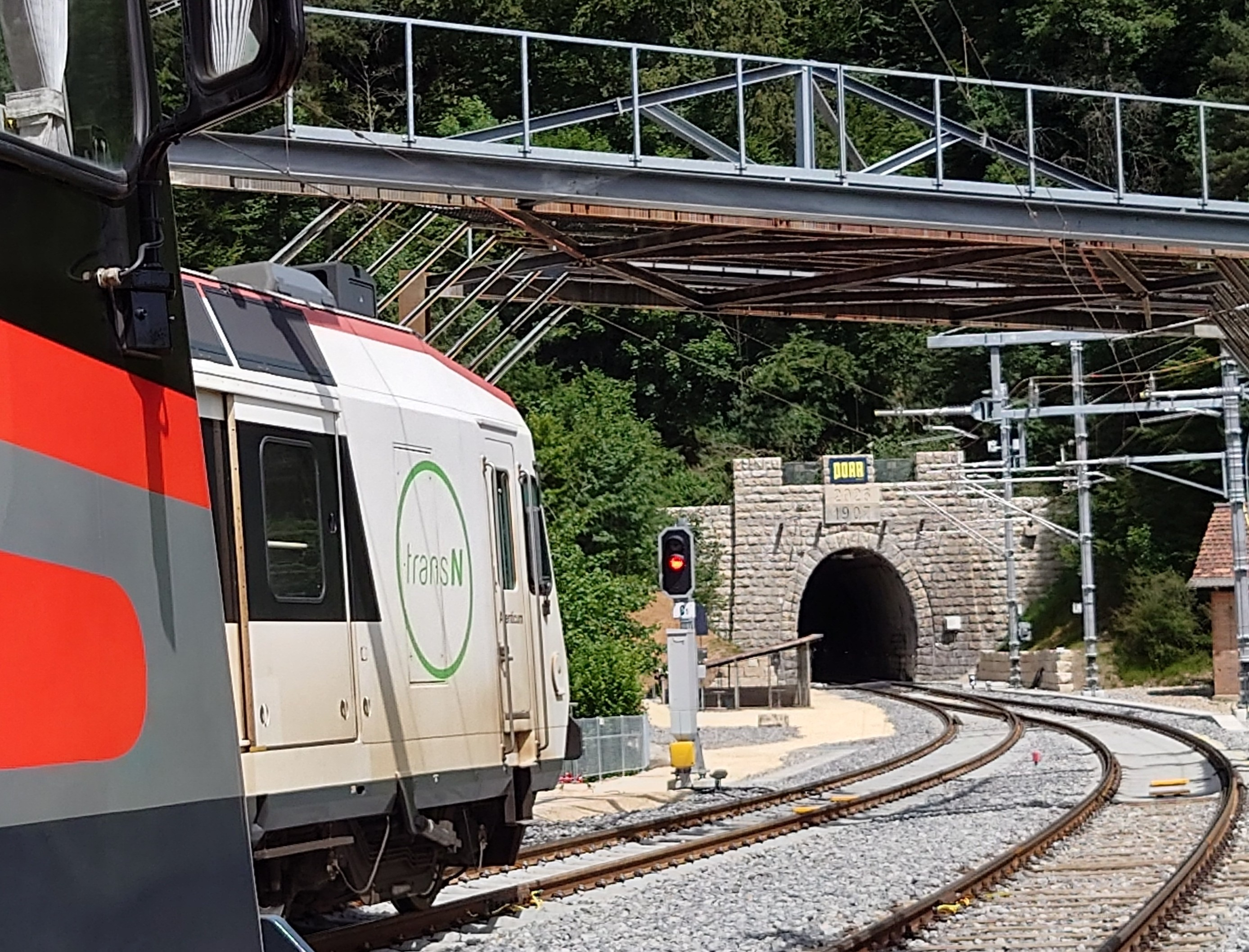
- South portal of the Weissenstein Tunnel at the Oberdorf SO station after renovation, 2026
- Interactive map of Weissenstein Tunnel

Overview
- Line: Solothurn–Moutier line
- Location: Canton of Solothurn
- Coordinates: 47.26449°N 7.46611°E (north portal); 47.23700°N 7.49374°E (south portal)
- System: BLS AG
- Crosses: Jura Mountains

Operation
- Work began: December 1903
- Opened: 1 August 1908
- Owner: Solothurn-Münster-Bahn

Technical
- Length: 3,701 m (12,142 ft)
- No. of tracks: 1
- Max elevation: 722 m
- Min elevation: 659 m
- Grade: 18 ‰

The Weissenstein Tunnel is a 3,701 metres (12,142 ft) long, single-track railway tunnel on the Solothurn–Moutier railway line, built by the former Solothurn-Münster-Bahn. It passes under the 1,395-meter-high Weissenstein as a Jura crossing. Renovation of the tunnel took place from March 2024 to May 2026.

== Location and construction ==
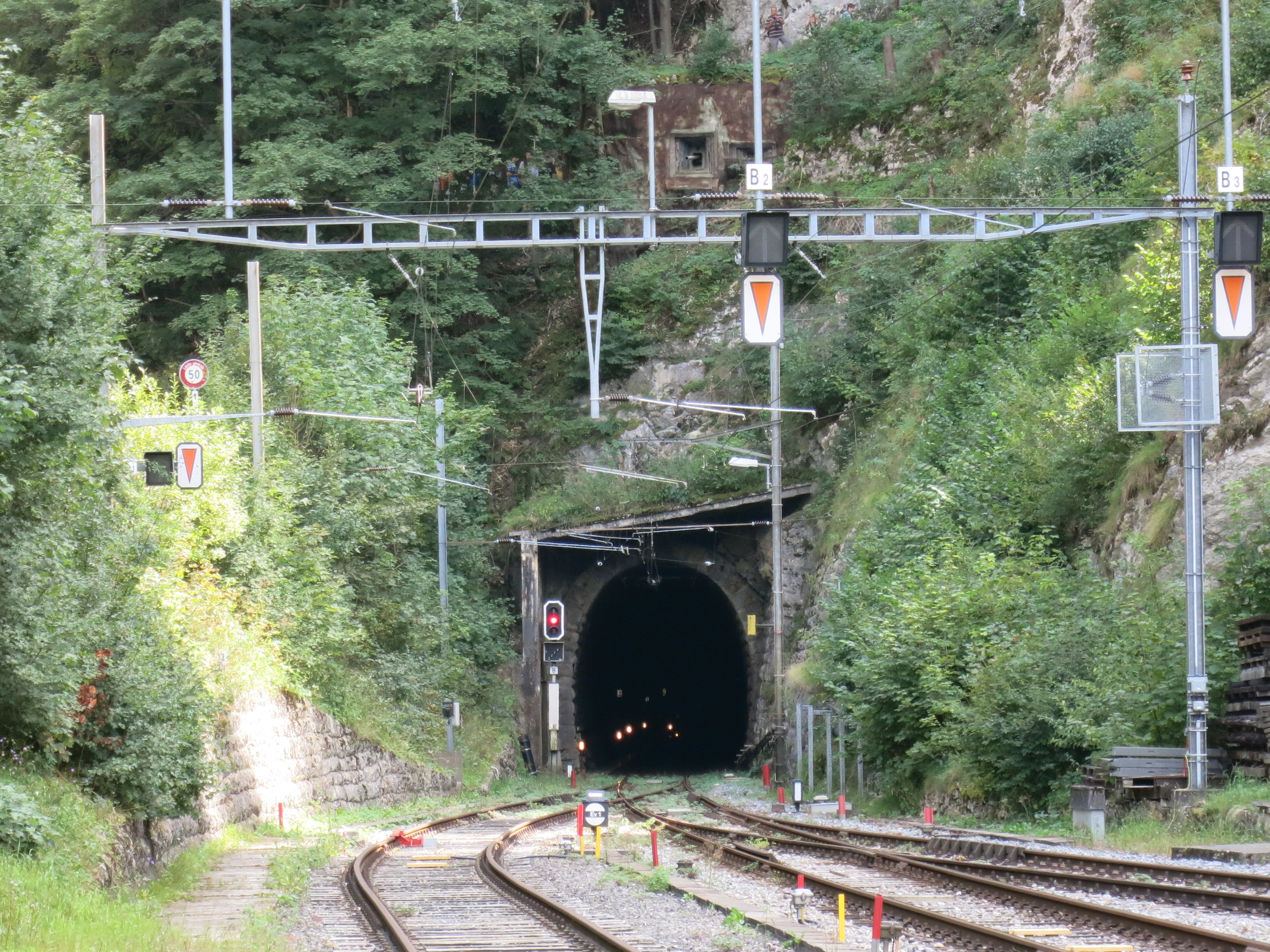
North portal at Gänsbrunnen station. The bunker of the Gänsbrunnen barrier is visible above the portal.

The north portal is located at Gänsbrunnen at an elevation of 722 meters above sea level, and the south portal is at 659 meters above sea level at Oberdorf.

The tunnel has a one-sided gradient from north to south of 18 ‰, with only a short section on the northern side being level. In addition, the tunnel is straight except for the last 120 meters at the southern exit, which had to be curved with a 300-meter radius.

Construction of the tunnel began at the south side at the end of December 1903. After initial hand drilling at the adit, compressed air percussion drills from Bechem and Reetmann were used, allowing an average breakthrough of 4 meters per day. In contrast, only 292 meters of tunnel were drilled by hand from the north side. On September 23, 1906, the breakthrough occurred 3,406 meters from the south portal. The deviations were 49 mm laterally and 11 mm vertically. On August 1, 1908, the tunnel was opened along with the Moutier to Solothurn West section.

== Operation ==
Today, the line and tunnel are operated by BLS, and the Weissenstein Tunnel is traversed in both directions by SBB on an hourly basis, taking around 4 minutes.

== Renovation ==
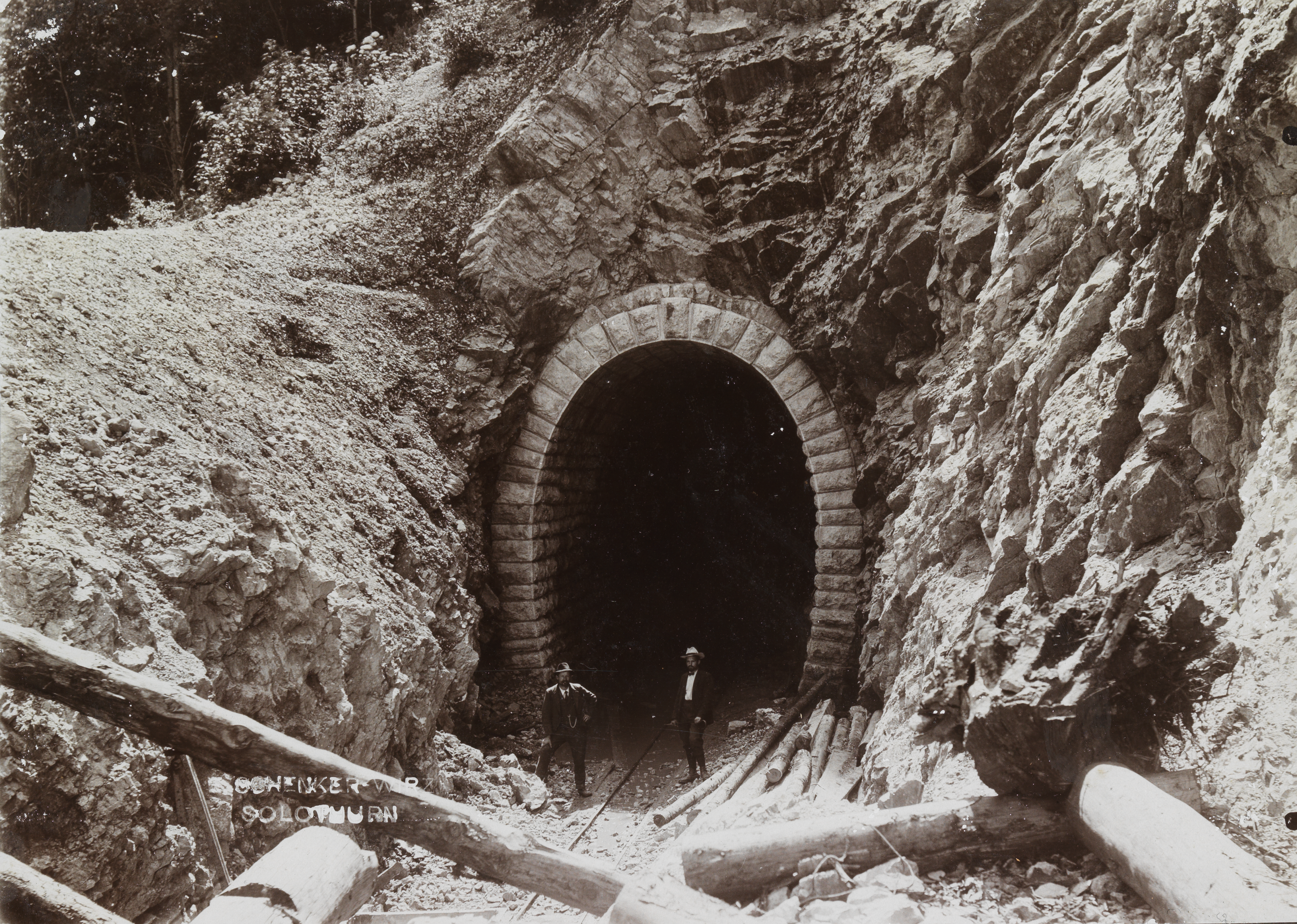
North portal of the Weissenstein Tunnel (1906)

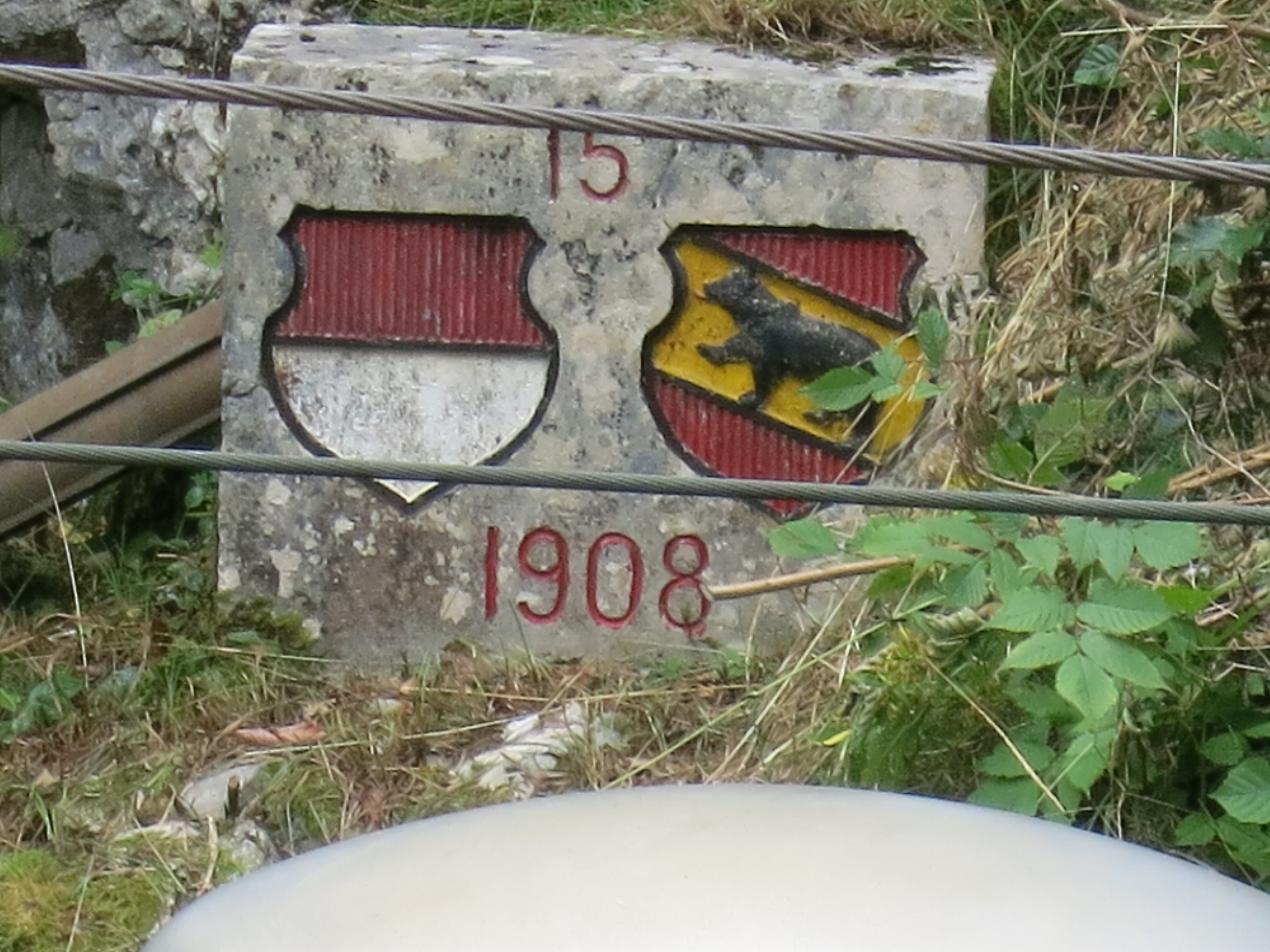
Canton border Solothurn-Bern at the north portal

Starting in 2014, an assessment was made to determine whether the estimated investment for the renovation, ranging from 100 million CHF (for 25 years of service) to 170 million CHF (for 50 years), was worthwhile for the federal government, or whether a replacement offer with a better cost-benefit ratio would be possible, as required by Swiss federal law in such cases.

In February 2017, the Federal Office of Transport (FOT) decided to renovate the tunnel, responding to the concerns of the affected regions. Their concerns were given higher priority than economic considerations. The renovation was expected to cost around 85 million CHF, to be funded by the federal government through the railway infrastructure fund. The tunnel was renovated to allow another 25 years of operation. The construction work was initially planned to begin in 2020 but was postponed for a year to allow for the simultaneous renovation of the entire line. The tunnel was scheduled to be renovated from 2021 to 2022. Due to a legal dispute, the renovation date was postponed several times. After the legal dispute was concluded in May 2023, the renovation work began on 4 March 2024, which took longer than originally planned due to the brittle rock. On 30 May 2026, a ceremony was held in Oberdorf to celebrate the reopening of the renovated tunnel. On that day, special train services ran through the tunnel between Oberdorf and Gänsbrunnen. One week later, on 6 June 2026, the SBB resumed passenger services through the tunnel.

== Bibliography ==
- Dolezalek, Carl (1923). "Weissensteintunnel". In Röll, Victor von (ed.). Enzyklopädie des Eisenbahnwesens (in German). Vol. 10. Urban & Schwarzenberg. p. 323.
