= Corcelles, Bern =

Corcelles
- Municipality
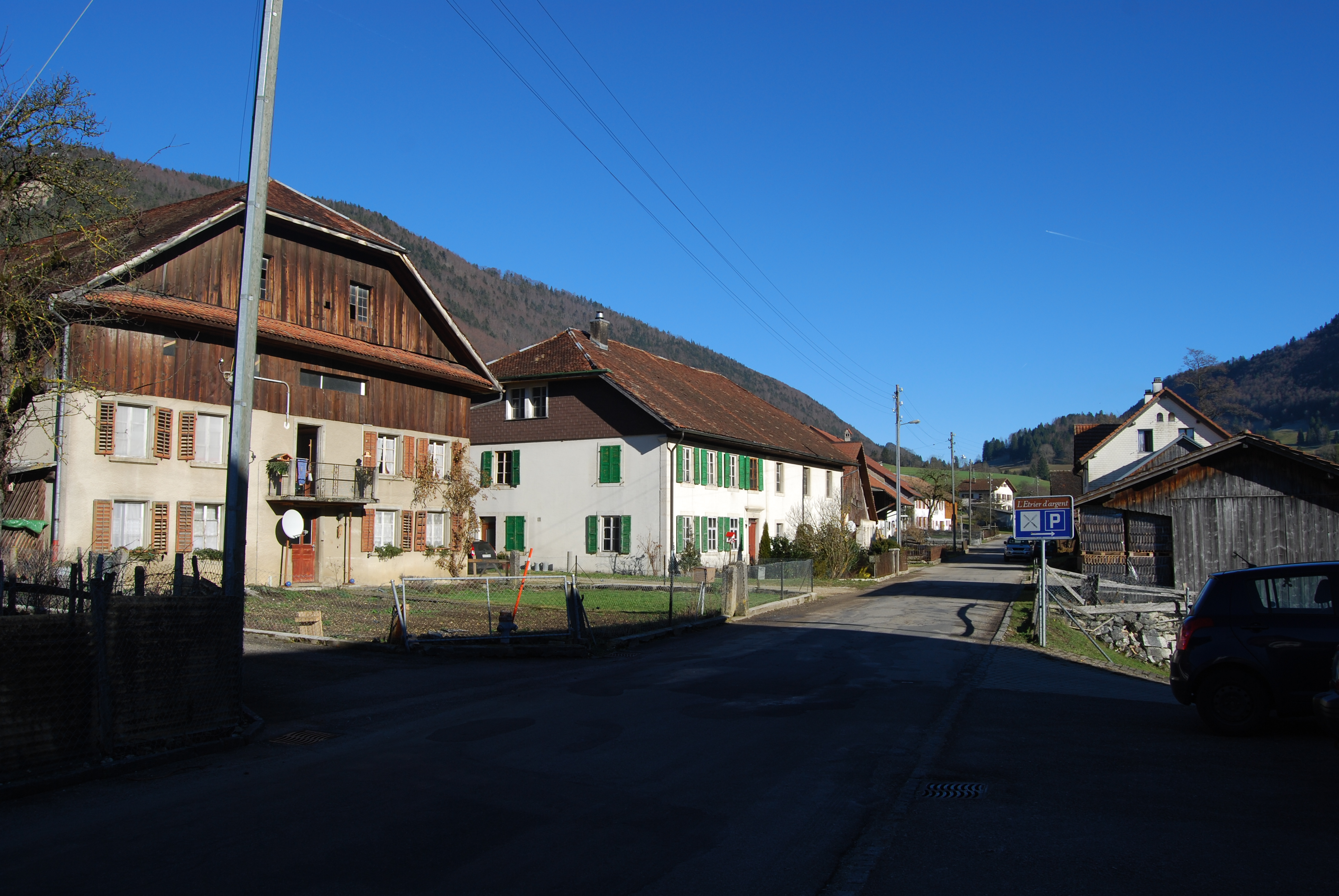
- Corcelles village

- Flag Coat of arms
- Location of Corcelles
- Location within Switzerland Location within Canton of Bern
- Coordinates: 47°17′N 7°27′E
- Country: Switzerland
- Canton: Bern
- District: Jura bernois

Government
  - Mayor: Maire; Fabienne Jordi

Area
  - Total: 6.78 km^{2} (2.62 sq mi)
- Elevation: 655 m (2,149 ft)

Population (Dec 2011)
  - Total: 214
  - Density: 31.6/km^{2} (81.7/sq mi)
- Time zone: UTC+01:00 (CET)
  - Summer (DST): UTC+02:00 (CEST)
- Postal code: 2747
- SFOS number: 687
- ISO 3166 code: CH-BE
- Surrounded by: Crémines, Seehof/Elay, Vermes (JU), Gänsbrunnen (SO)
- Website: www.corcelles-be.ch

Corcelles (Frainc-Comtou: Cochèles) is a municipality in the Jura bernois administrative district in the canton of Bern in Switzerland. It is located in the French-speaking part of the canton in the Jura Mountains.

== History ==
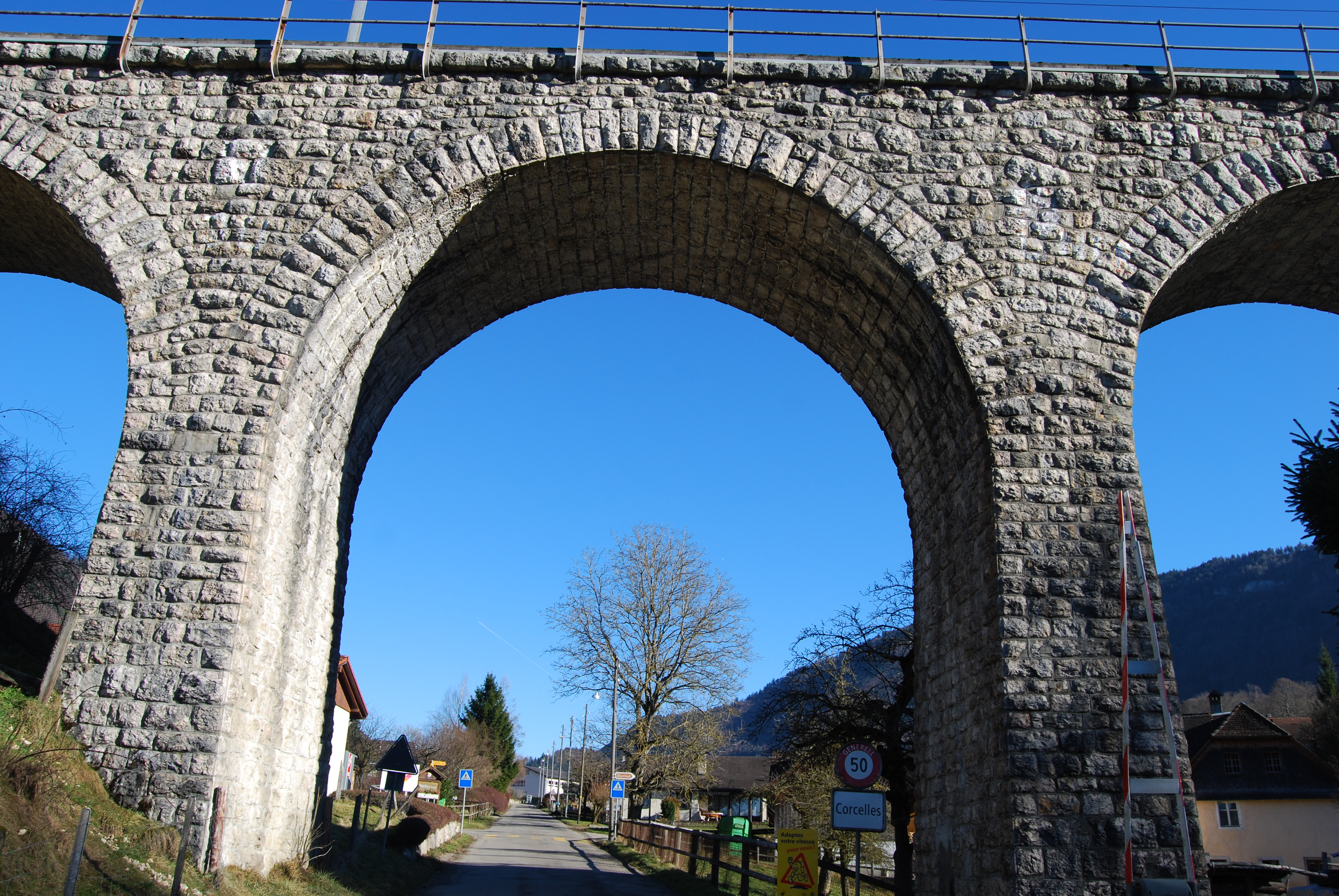
Corcelles railroad bridge

Corcelles may have been first mentioned in 1181 as Corcellis though there is some debate over this mention.

The village has always been part of the parish of Grandval. In 1531, the entire parish converted to the new faith of the Protestant Reformation.

For most of its history, the village was owned by the provost of Moutier-Grandval Abbey. After the 1797 French victory and the Treaty of Campo Formio, Corcelles became part of the French Département of Mont-Terrible. Three years later, in 1800 it became part of the Département of Haut-Rhin. After Napoleon's defeat and the Congress of Vienna, Corcelles was assigned to the Canton of Bern in 1815.

Iron has been mined and smelted in Corcelles for centuries. A hydraulic hammer mill operated in the village from 1791 until 1955. Today the building has been restored and is a museum. From 1830 until 1842, the iron was smelted in a blast furnace by Ludwig von Rolls. While the iron industry was important to the region, the village was isolated and difficult to reach. In 1904-08, the Solothurn-Moutier railway built a railroad bridge to link the village to the rest of the country.

== Geography ==
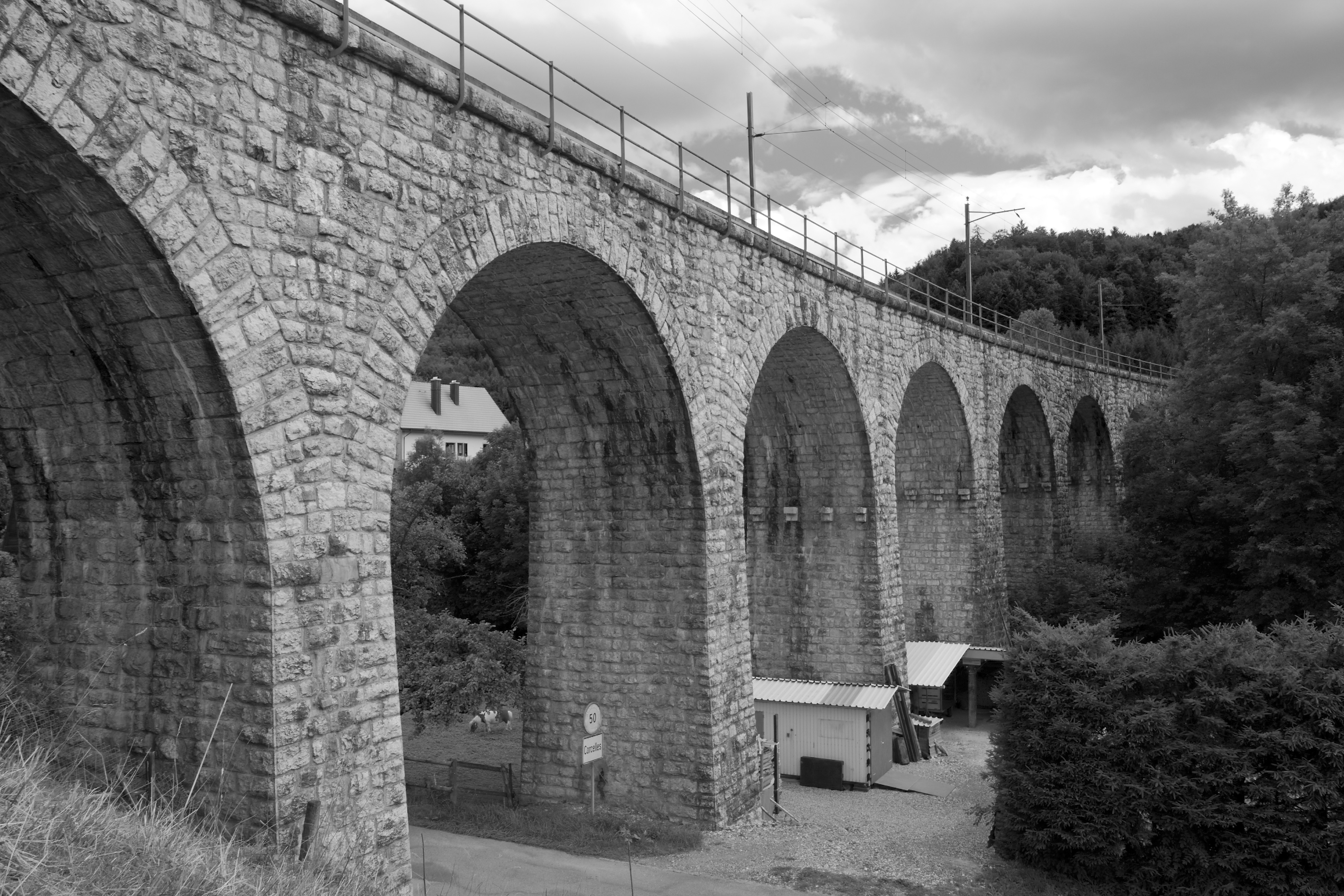
The Corcelles railway bridge stretches across the valley

Aerial view (1955)

Corcelles has an area of 6.79 km^{2} (2.62 sq mi). As of 2012, a total of 2.81 km^{2} (1.08 mi^{2}) or 41.5% is used for agricultural purposes, while 3.81 km^{2} (1.47 mi^{2}) or 56.3% is forested. Of the rest of the land, 0.16 km^{2} (0.062 mi^{2}) or 2.4% is settled (buildings or roads).

During the same year, housing and buildings made up 1.5% and transportation infrastructure made up 0.7%. Out of the forested land, 51.6% of the total land area is heavily forested and 4.7% is covered with orchards or small clusters of trees. Of the agricultural land, 7.5% is used for growing crops and 12.7% is pastures and 21.3% is used for alpine pastures.

It is a ribbon village on the east end of the Grand Val (valley of Moutier), with some houses on Mont Raimeux.

On 31 December 2009, District de Moutier, the municipality's former district, was dissolved. On the following day, 1 January 2010, it joined the newly created Arrondissement administratif Jura bernois.

== Coat of arms ==
The blazon of the municipal coat of arms is Per pale Argent a Gules two Fishes in pale counterchanged. The fish represent the fish of the Gaibiat river which passes through the municipality.

== Demographics ==
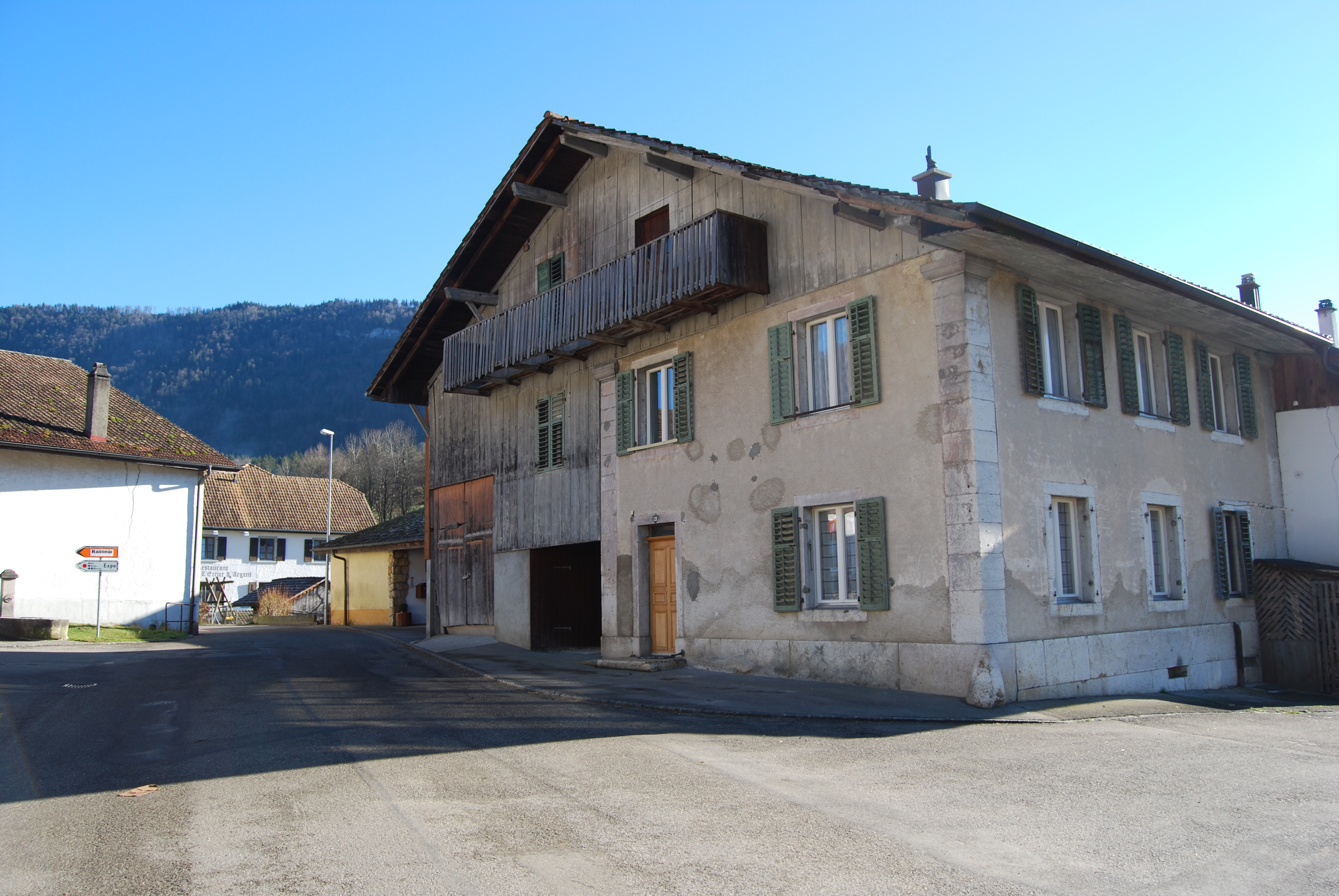
Houses in Corcelles

Corcelles has a population (as of December 2020) of 201. As of 2010, 3.1% of the population are resident foreign nationals. Over the last 10 years (2001-2011) the population has changed at a rate of -4%. Migration accounted for -2.2%, while births and deaths accounted for 0%.

Most of the population (as of 2000) speaks French (173 or 84.4%) as their first language, German is the second most common (31 or 15.1%) and Italian is the third (1 or 0.5%).

As of 2008, the population was 49.8% male and 50.2% female. The population was made up of 108 Swiss men (48.4% of the population) and 3 (1.3%) non-Swiss men. There were 108 Swiss women (48.4%) and 4 (1.8%) non-Swiss women. Of the population in the municipality, 68 or about 33.2% were born in Corcelles and lived there in 2000. There were 71 or 34.6% who were born in the same canton, while 54 or 26.3% were born somewhere else in Switzerland, and 9 or 4.4% were born outside of Switzerland.

As of 2011, children and teenagers (0–19 years old) make up 20.6% of the population, while adults (20–64 years old) make up 58.4% and seniors (over 64 years old) make up 21%.

As of 2000, there were 87 people who were single and never married in the municipality. There were 94 married individuals, 19 widows or widowers and 5 individuals who are divorced.

As of 2010, there were 33 households that consist of only one person and 13 households with five or more people. In 2000, a total of 75 apartments (81.5% of the total) were permanently occupied, while 13 apartments (14.1%) were seasonally occupied and 4 apartments (4.3%) were empty. As of 2010, the construction rate of new housing units was 4.5 new units per 1000 residents. The vacancy rate for the municipality, in 2012, was 1.83%.

The historical population is given in the following chart:

== Politics ==
In the 2011 federal election the most popular party was the Swiss People's Party (SVP) which received 34.3% of the vote. The next three most popular parties were the Federal Democratic Union of Switzerland (EDU) (20.4%), the Christian Democratic People's Party (CVP) (11.7%) and the Evangelical People's Party (EVP) (9.2%). In the federal election, a total of 73 votes were cast, and the voter turnout was 43.7%.

== Economy ==
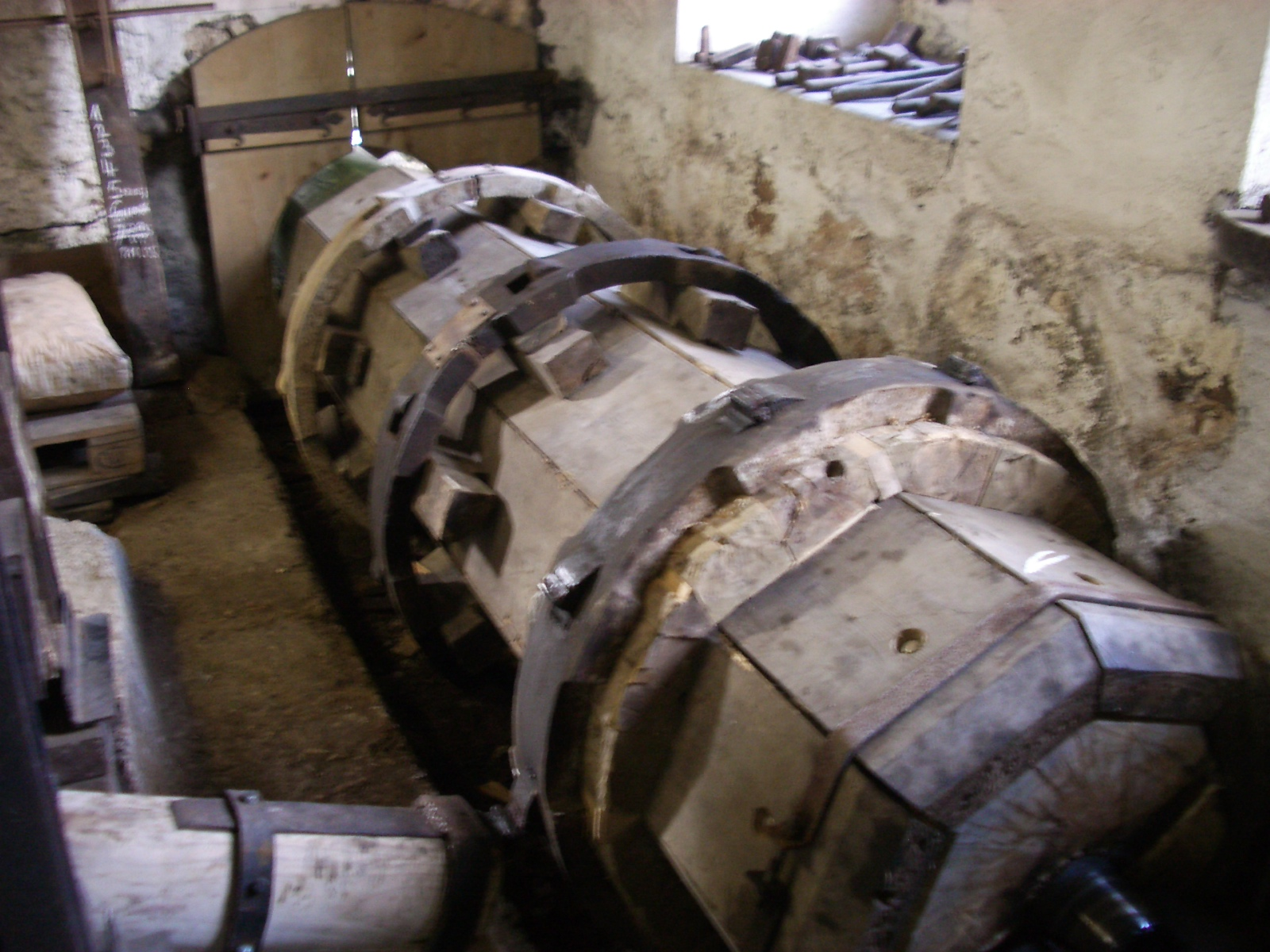
Restored hammer mill in Corcelles. This mill was in operation for almost two centuries.

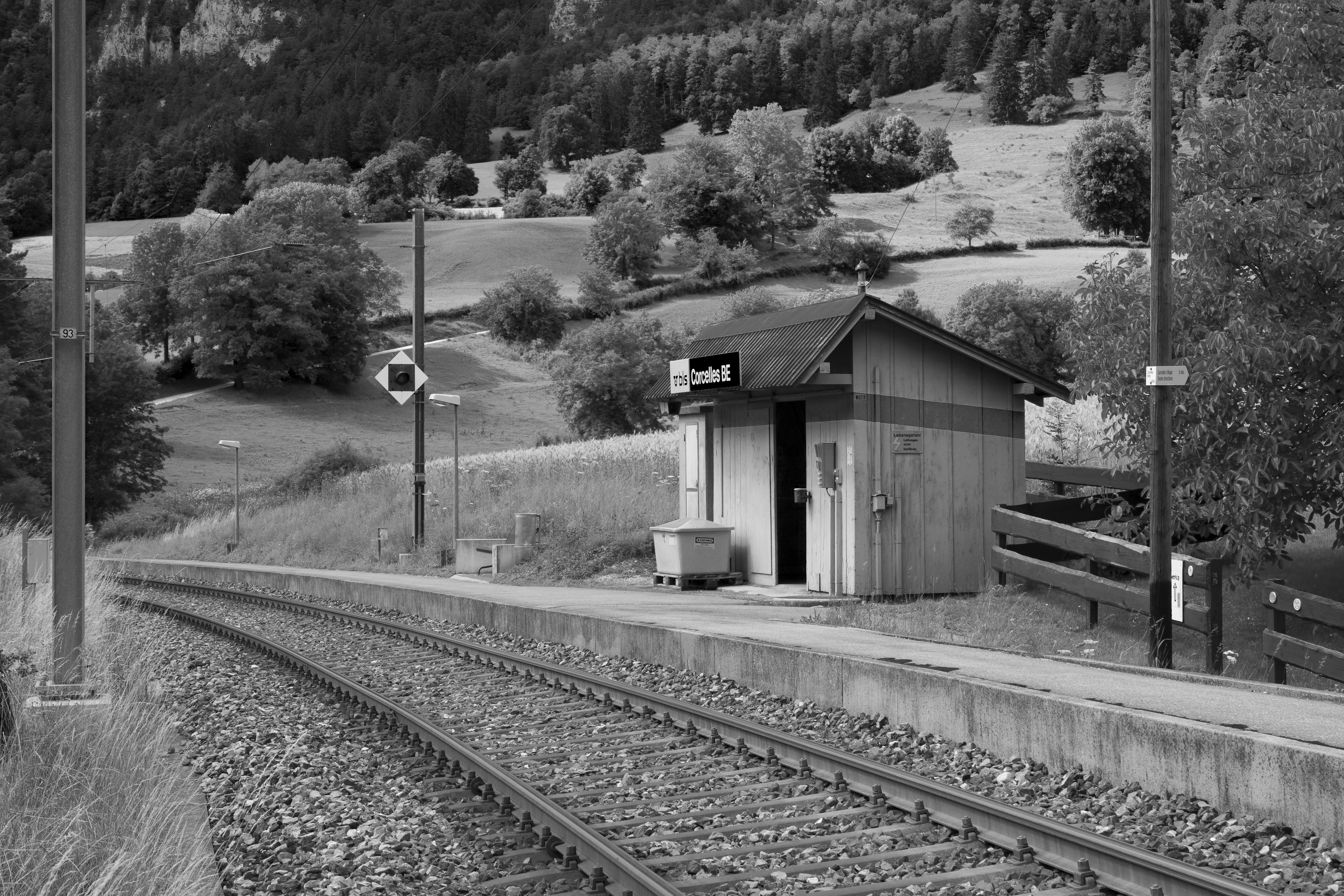
Corcelles train station

As of 2011, Corcelles had an unemployment rate of 0.86%. As of 2008, there were a total of 70 people employed in the municipality. Of these, there were 24 people employed in the primary economic sector and about 8 businesses involved in this sector. 19 people were employed in the secondary sector and there were 6 businesses in this sector. 27 people were employed in the tertiary sector, with 3 businesses in this sector. There were 106 residents of the municipality who were employed in some capacity, of which females made up 42.5% of the workforce.

In 2008 there were a total of 53 full-time equivalent jobs. The number of jobs in the primary sector was 15, all of which were in agriculture. The number of jobs in the secondary sector was 18 of which 8 or (44.4%) were in manufacturing and 10 (55.6%) were in construction. The number of jobs in the tertiary sector was 20. In the tertiary sector; 2 were in wholesale or retail sales or the repair of motor vehicles, 4 were in a hotel or restaurant, 14 were in education.

In 2000, there were 9 workers who commuted into the municipality and 75 workers who commuted away. The municipality is a net exporter of workers, with about 8.3 workers leaving the municipality for every one entering. A total of 31 workers (77.5% of the 40 total workers in the municipality) both lived and worked in Corcelles. Of the working population, 11.3% used public transportation to get to work, and 61.3% used a private car.

In 2011 the average local and cantonal tax rate on a married resident of Corcelles making 150,000 CHF was 13.2%, while an unmarried resident's rate was 19.4%. For comparison, the rate for the entire canton in the same year, was 14.2% for married residents and 22.0% for single. The nationwide rate was 12.3% and 21.1% respectively. In 2009 there were a total of 100 tax payers in the municipality. Of that total, 26 made over 75,000 CHF per year. There were 2 people who made between 15,000 and 20,000 per year. The average income of the over 75,000 CHF group in Corcelles was 112,900 CHF, while the average across all of Switzerland was 130,478 CHF.

== Religion ==
From the 2000 census, 107 or 52.2% belonged to the Swiss Reformed Church, while 47 or 22.9% were Roman Catholic. Of the rest of the population, there was 1 member of an Orthodox church, there was 1 individual who belongs to the Christian Catholic Church, and there were 36 individuals (or about 17.56% of the population) who belonged to another Christian church. 8 (or about 3.90% of the population) belonged to no church, are agnostic or atheist, and 5 individuals (or about 2.44% of the population) did not answer the question.

== Education ==
In Corcelles about 59.4% of the population have completed non-mandatory upper secondary education, and 6.6% have completed additional higher education (either university or a Fachhochschule). Of the 7 who had completed some form of tertiary schooling listed in the census, 71.4% were Swiss men, 28.6% were Swiss women.

The Canton of Bern school system provides one year of non-obligatory Kindergarten, followed by six years of Primary school. This is followed by three years of obligatory lower Secondary school where the students are separated according to ability and aptitude. Following the lower Secondary students may attend additional schooling or they may enter an apprenticeship.

During the 2011-12 school year, there were a total of 11 students attending classes in Corcelles. There were no kindergarten classes and one primary class with 11 students.

As of 2000, there were a total of 22 students attending any school in the municipality. Of those, 4 both lived and attended school in the municipality, while 18 students came from another municipality. During the same year, 35 residents attended schools outside the municipality.
