= Crémines =

- Municipality
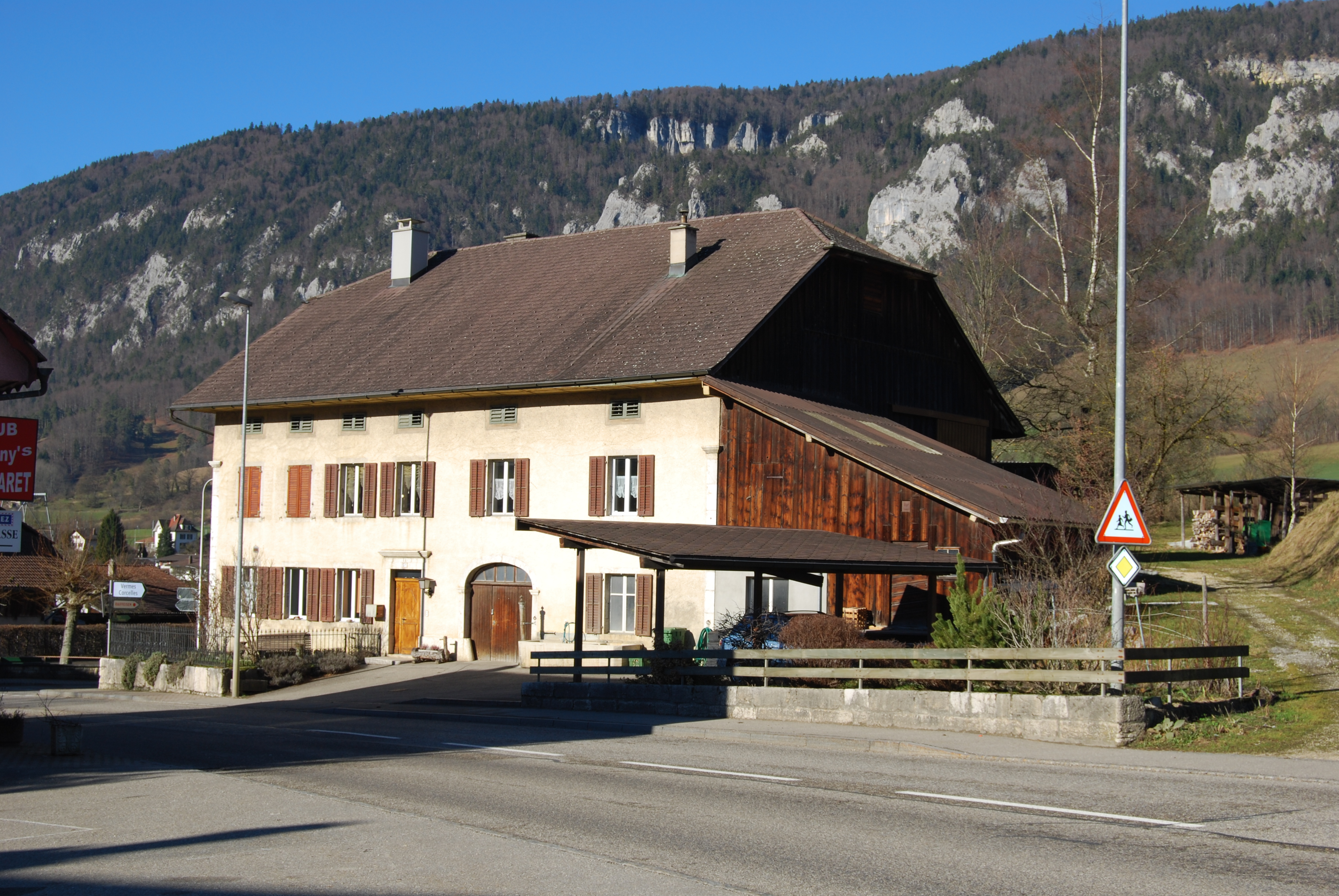
- Crémines village

- Flag Coat of arms
- Location of Crémines
- Location within Switzerland Location within Canton of Bern
- Coordinates: 47°17′N 7°26.5′E
- Country: Switzerland
- Canton: Bern
- District: Jura bernois

Government
  - Mayor: Maire; Carole Ristori

Area
  - Total: 9.35 km^{2} (3.61 sq mi)
- Elevation: 616 m (2,021 ft)

Population (Dec 2011)
  - Total: 548
  - Density: 58.6/km^{2} (152/sq mi)
- Time zone: UTC+01:00 (CET)
  - Summer (DST): UTC+02:00 (CEST)
- Postal code: 2746
- SFOS number: 691
- ISO 3166 code: CH-BE
- Surrounded by: Grandval, Corcelles, Vermes (JU), Rebeuvelier (JU), Gänsbrunnen (SO)
- Website: www.cremines.ch

Crémines is a municipality in the Jura bernois administrative district in the canton of Bern in Switzerland. It is located in the French-speaking Bernese Jura (Jura Bernois).

== History ==
Crémines is first mentioned in 1461 as Crimene.

The oldest trace of a settlement in the area are several early medieval graves. For much of its history it was owned by the provost of Moutier-Grandval Abbey. During the Middle Ages and into the Early Modern era the Pré de Sales in Crémines was used as the dueling grounds for entire valley. In 1531 the village accepted the new faith of the Protestant Reformation along with the rest of the parish of Grandval. After the 1797 French victory and the Treaty of Campo Formio, Crémines became part of the French Département of Mont-Terrible. Three years later, in 1800 it became part of the Département of Haut-Rhin. After Napoleon's defeat and the Congress of Vienna, Crémines was assigned to the Canton of Bern in 1815.

Until about 1900, the local economy was still dominated by agriculture with a few cottage industries that manufactured pottery, watch parts and arquebuses. This began to change with the growth of the machinery manufacturing industry in nearby Moutier and the construction of the Solothurn-Moutier railroad in 1904-08. A number of industrial factories settled in Crémines and remained. Today over half of the working population is in the industrial sector. In 1972, a zoo opened in the municipality.

== Geography ==
Aerial view by Walter Mittelholzer (1934)

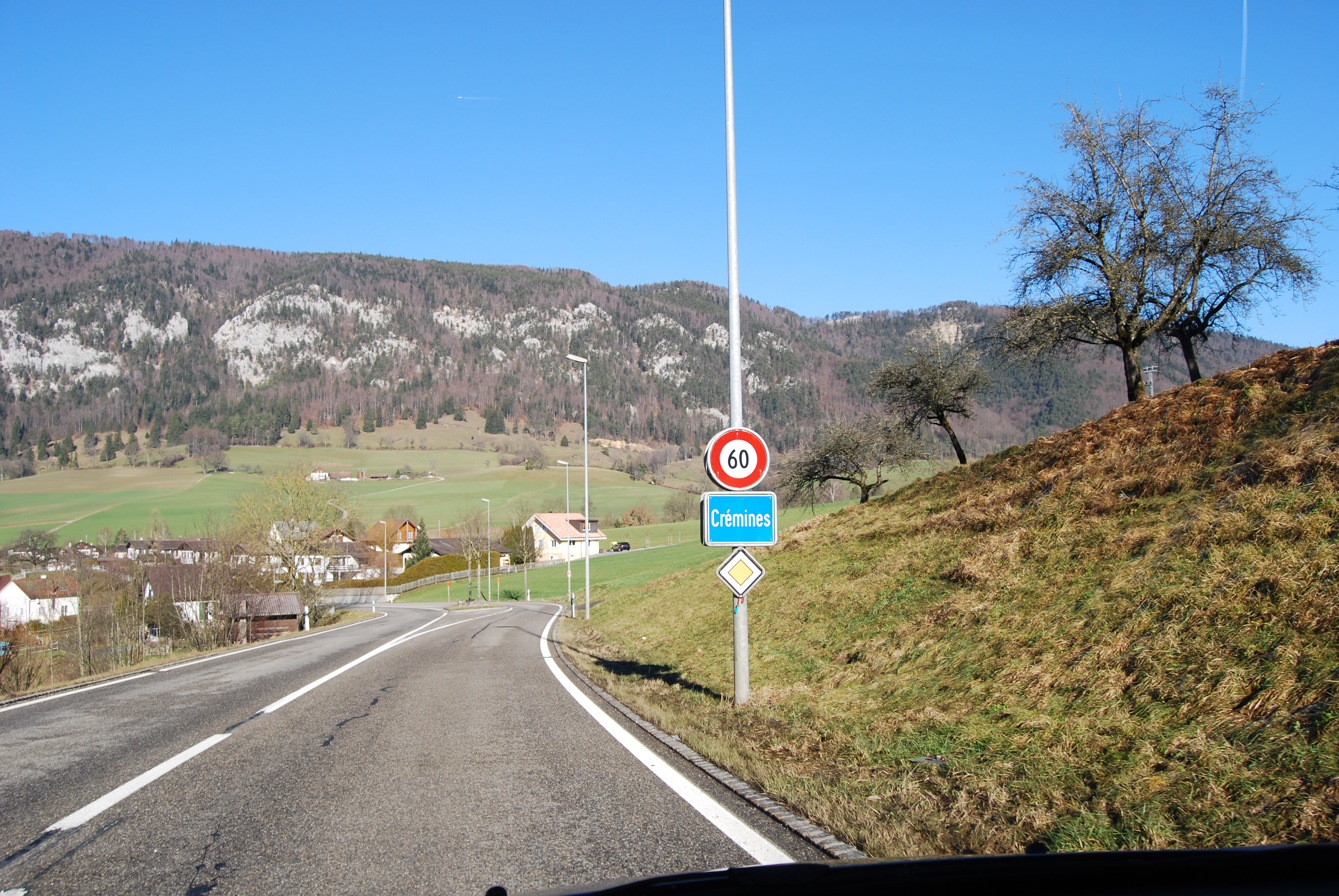
The entrance to the village and surrounding mountains

Crémines has an area of 9.48 km^{2} (3.66 sq mi). As of 2012, a total of 4 km^{2} (1.5 mi^{2}) or 42.1% is used for agricultural purposes, while 4.97 km^{2} (1.92 mi^{2}) or 52.4% is forested. Of the rest of the land, 0.51 km^{2} (0.20 mi^{2}) or 5.4% is settled (buildings or roads) and 0.03 km^{2} (7.4 acres) or 0.3% is unproductive land.

During the same year, housing and buildings made up 2.3% and transportation infrastructure made up 2.3%. Out of the forested land, 44.9% of the total land area is heavily forested and 7.5% is covered with orchards or small clusters of trees. Of the agricultural land, 8.6% is used for growing crops and 15.1% is pastures and 18.2% is used for alpine pastures.

The municipality includes the village of Crémines in the Grand Val (valley of Moutier), and some scattered farmhouses on Mont Raimeux, which has only been accessible by road since 1859.

On 31 December 2009 District de Moutier, the municipality's former district, was dissolved. On the following day, 1 January 2010, it joined the newly created Arrondissement administratif Jura bernois.

== Coat of arms ==
The blazon of the municipal coat of arms is Argent a Cauldron Gules. The cauldron refers to the traditional wax gathering industry.

== Demographics ==
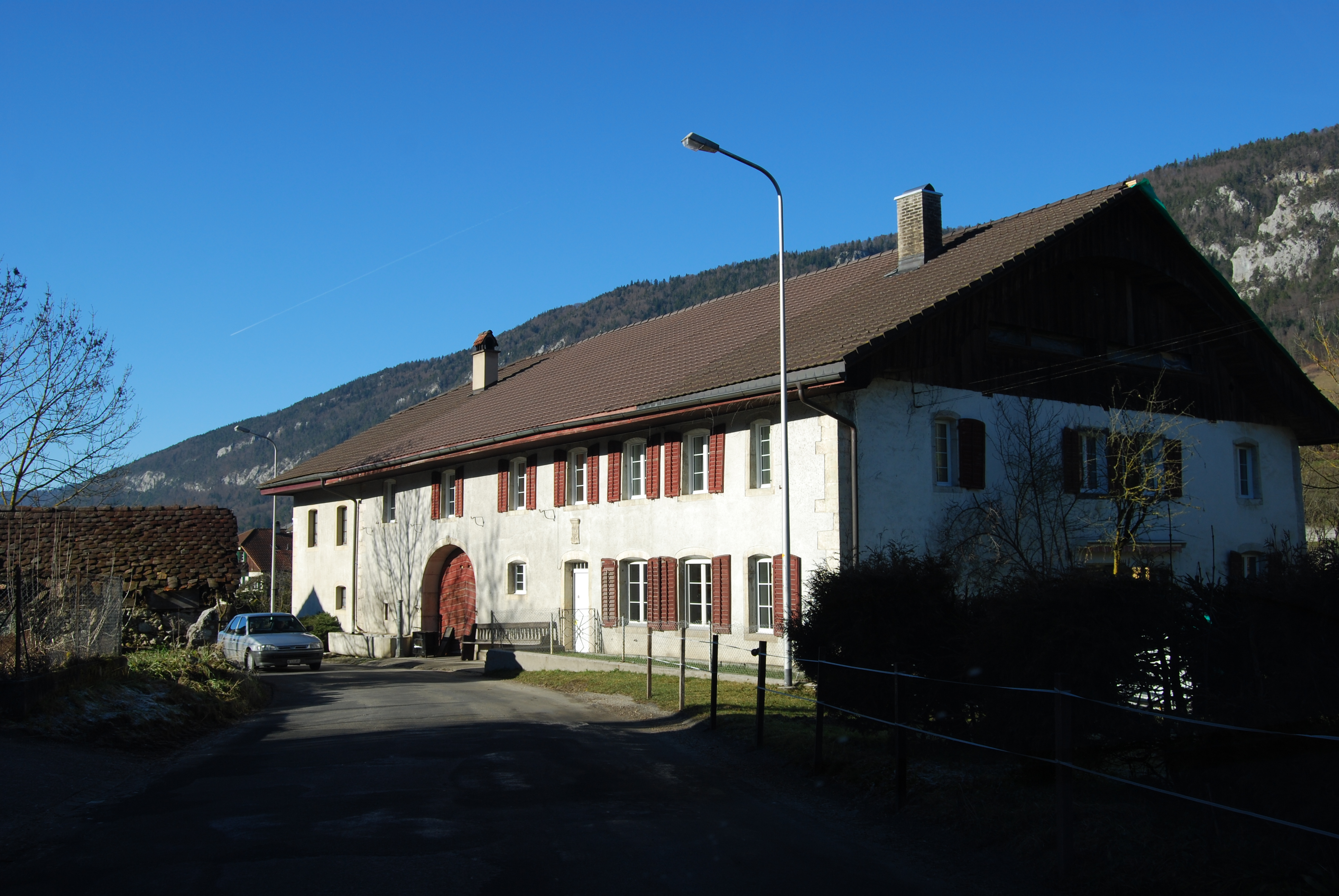
A house in Crémines

Crémines has a population (as of December 2020) of 488. As of 2010, 8.9% of the population are resident foreign nationals. Over the last 10 years (2001-2011) the population has changed at a rate of 3.4%. Migration accounted for 1.3%, while births and deaths accounted for 0.4%.

Most of the population (as of 2000) speaks French (464 or 80.4%) as their first language, German is the second most common (81 or 14.0%) and Spanish is the third (10 or 1.7%). There are 2 people who speak Italian.

As of 2008, the population was 49.4% male and 50.6% female. The population was made up of 237 Swiss men (44.7% of the population) and 25 (4.7%) non-Swiss men. There were 246 Swiss women (46.4%) and 22 (4.2%) non-Swiss women. Of the population in the municipality, 167 or about 28.9% were born in Crémines and lived there in 2000. There were 164 or 28.4% who were born in the same canton, while 154 or 26.7% were born somewhere else in Switzerland, and 61 or 10.6% were born outside of Switzerland.

As of 2011, children and teenagers (0–19 years old) make up 22.4% of the population, while adults (20–64 years old) make up 55.5% and seniors (over 64 years old) make up 22.1%.

As of 2000, there were 211 people who were single and never married in the municipality. There were 280 married individuals, 58 widows or widowers and 28 individuals who are divorced.

As of 2010, there were 84 households that consist of only one person and 18 households with five or more people. In 2000, a total of 168 apartments (66.7% of the total) were permanently occupied, while 82 apartments (32.5%) were seasonally occupied and 2 apartments (0.8%) were empty. As of 2010, the construction rate of new housing units was 1.9 new units per 1000 residents. The vacancy rate for the municipality, in 2012, was 1.27%. In 2011, single family homes made up 55.1% of the total housing in the municipality.

The historical population is given in the following chart:

== Sights ==
The entire village of Crémines is designated as part of the Inventory of Swiss Heritage Sites.

== Politics ==
In the 2011 federal election the most popular party was the Social Democratic Party (SP) which received 28.3% of the vote. The next three most popular parties were the Swiss People's Party (SVP) (25.5%), the Green Party (8.2%) and the Conservative Democratic Party (BDP) (8%). In the federal election, a total of 144 votes were cast, and the voter turnout was 36.5%.

== Economy ==
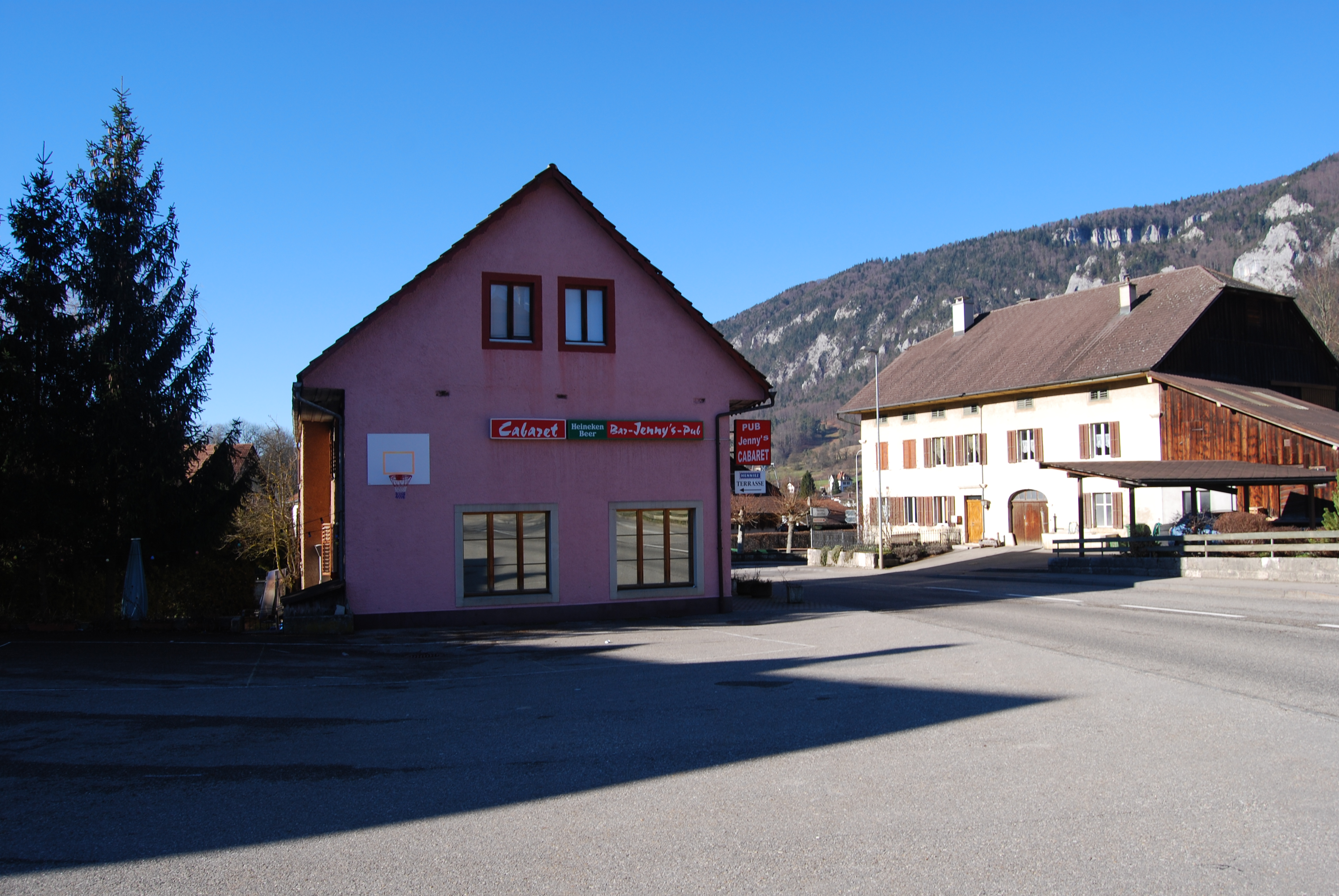
Jenny's pub and cabaret in Crémines

As of 2011, Crémines had an unemployment rate of 0.98%. As of 2008, there were a total of 223 people employed in the municipality. Of these, there were 18 people employed in the primary economic sector and about 7 businesses involved in this sector. 111 people were employed in the secondary sector and there were 8 businesses in this sector. 94 people were employed in the tertiary sector, with 17 businesses in this sector. There were 263 residents of the municipality who were employed in some capacity, of which females made up 39.2% of the workforce.

In 2008 there were a total of 189 full-time equivalent jobs. The number of jobs in the primary sector was 14, all of which were in agriculture. The number of jobs in the secondary sector was 100 of which 90 were in manufacturing and 10 were in construction. The number of jobs in the tertiary sector was 75. In the tertiary sector; 8 or 10.7% were in wholesale or retail sales or the repair of motor vehicles, 3 or 4.0% were in the movement and storage of goods, 13 or 17.3% were in a hotel or restaurant, 1 was the insurance or financial industry, 1 was a technical professional or scientist and 35 or 46.7% were in health care.

In 2000, there were 105 workers who commuted into the municipality and 172 workers who commuted away. The municipality is a net exporter of workers, with about 1.6 workers leaving the municipality for every one entering. A total of 91 workers (46.4% of the 196 total workers in the municipality) both lived and worked in Crémines. Of the working population, 15.2% used public transportation to get to work, and 57.4% used a private car.

In 2011 the average local and cantonal tax rate on a married resident, with two children, of Crémines making 150,000 CHF was 12.7%, while an unmarried resident's rate was 18.7%. For comparison, the rate for the entire canton in the same year, was 14.2% for married residents and 22.0% for single. The nationwide rate was 12.3% and 21.1% respectively. In 2009 there were a total of 224 tax payers in the municipality. Of that total, 59 made over 75,000 CHF per year. There were 4 people who made between 15,000 and 20,000 per year. The average income of the over 75,000 CHF group in Crémines was 114,861 CHF, while the average across all of Switzerland was 130,478 CHF.

== Religion ==
From the 2000 census, 288 or 49.9% belonged to the Swiss Reformed Church, while 161 or 27.9% were Roman Catholic. Of the rest of the population, there were 5 members of an Orthodox church (or about 0.87% of the population), there were 3 individuals (or about 0.52% of the population) who belonged to the Christian Catholic Church, and there were 28 individuals (or about 4.85% of the population) who belonged to another Christian church. There was 1 individual who was Jewish, and 12 (or about 2.08% of the population) who were Islamic. There were 4 individuals who were Buddhist. 59 (or about 10.23% of the population) belonged to no church, are agnostic or atheist, and 16 individuals (or about 2.77% of the population) did not answer the question.

== Education ==
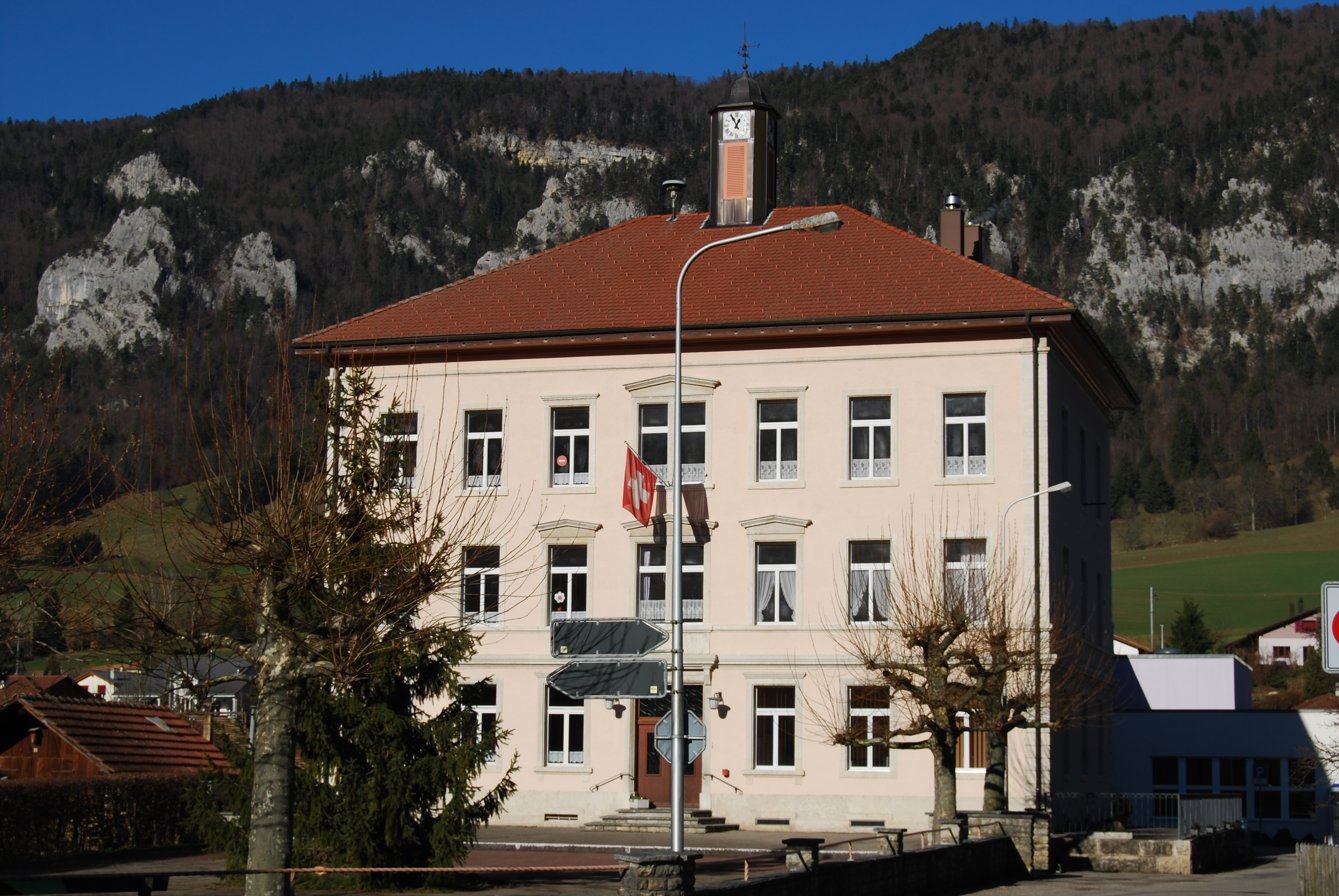
Old school of Crémines

In Crémines about 55.5% of the population have completed non-mandatory upper secondary education, and 11.3% have completed additional higher education (either university or a Fachhochschule). Of the 45 who had completed some form of tertiary schooling listed in the census, 66.7% were Swiss men, 24.4% were Swiss women.

The Canton of Bern school system provides one year of non-obligatory Kindergarten, followed by six years of Primary school. This is followed by three years of obligatory lower Secondary school where the students are separated according to ability and aptitude. Following the lower Secondary students may attend additional schooling or they may enter an apprenticeship.

During the 2011-12 school year, there were a total of 47 students attending classes in Crémines. There was one kindergarten class with a total of 16 students in the municipality. Of the kindergarten students, 12.5% were permanent or temporary residents of Switzerland (not citizens). The municipality had 2 primary classes and 31 students. Of the primary students, 6.5% were permanent or temporary residents of Switzerland (not citizens) and 16.1% have a different mother language than the classroom language.

As of 2000, there were a total of 43 students attending any school in the municipality. Of those, 20 both lived and attended school in the municipality, while 23 students came from another municipality. During the same year, 51 residents attended schools outside the municipality.

== Notable persons from Crémines ==
- Samuel Gobat, second Protestant Bishop of Jerusalem
