= Solothurn Allmend railway station =

Railway station in Switzerland

Solothurn Allmend
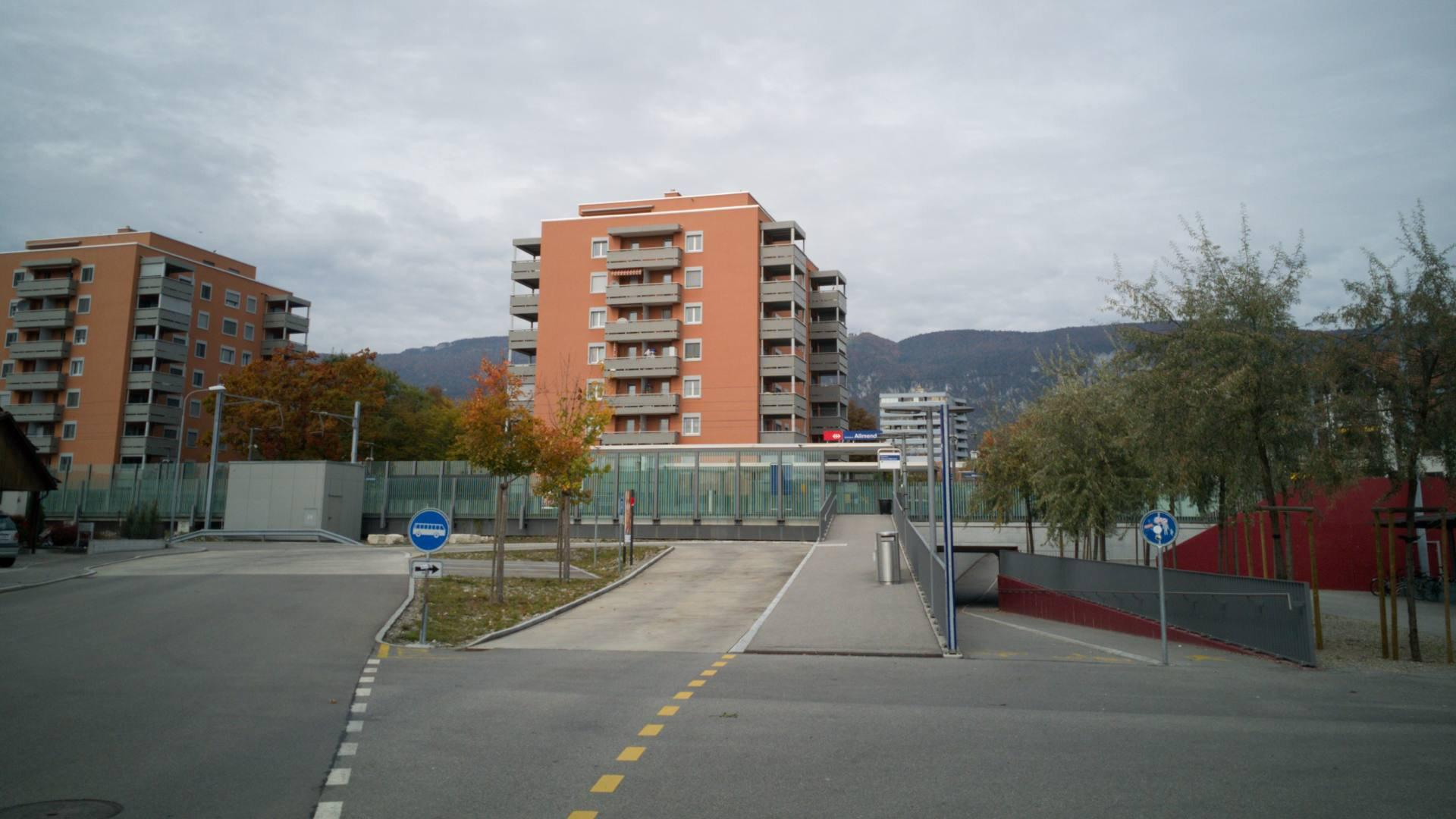
- The station platforms in 2018

General information
- Location: Solothurn; Switzerland
- Coordinates: 47°12′32″N 7°31′17″E
- Owner: Swiss Federal Railways
- Line: Jura Foot line
- Tracks: 2
- Train operators: Swiss Federal Railways
- Connections: Aare Seeland mobil and BSU buses

History
- Opened: 15 December 2013

Passengers
- 2018: 490 per weekday

Services
Preceding station	SBB CFF FFS	Following station
Bellach towards Biel/Bienne	S20	Solothurn West towards Olten
Location
- Location within Switzerland Location within Canton of Solothurn

Solothurn Allmend railway station (German: Bahnhof Solothurn Allmend) is a railway station in the municipality of Solothurn, in the Swiss canton of Solothurn. It is an intermediate stop on the standard gauge Jura Foot line of Swiss Federal Railways. The station opened on 15 December 2013.

== Services ==
As of the December 2021 timetable change, the following services stop at Solothurn Allmend:

- S20: half-hourly service between Biel/Bienne and Solothurn, with every other train continuing from Solothurn to Olten.
