= Bettlach railway station =

Railway station in Switzerland

Bettlach
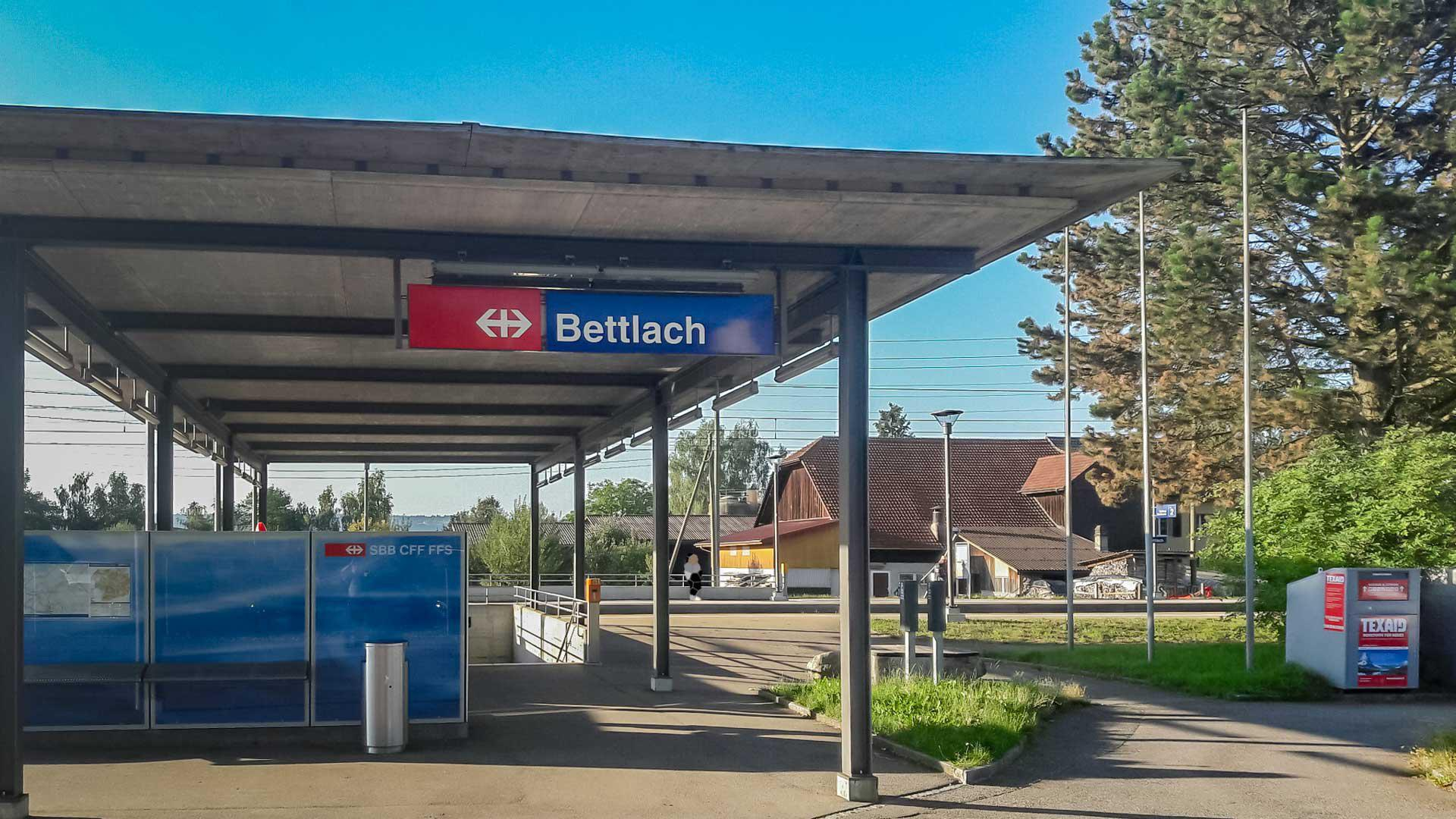
- The station platform in 2018

General information
- Location: Bettlach; Switzerland
- Coordinates: 47°11′42″N 7°25′42″E
- Owner: Swiss Federal Railways
- Line: Jura Foot line
- Distance: 82.9 km (51.5 mi) from Basel SBB
- Train operators: Swiss Federal Railways
- Connections: Busbetrieb Grenchen und Umgebung buses

Other information
- Fare zone: 250 (Libero)

Passengers
- 2018: 800 per weekday

Services
Preceding station	SBB CFF FFS	Following station
Grenchen Süd towards Biel/Bienne	S20	Selzach towards Olten
Location
- Location within Switzerland Location within Canton of Solothurn

Bettlach railway station (German: Bahnhof Bettlach) is a railway station in the municipality of Bettlach, in the Swiss canton of Solothurn. It is an intermediate stop on the standard gauge Jura Foot line of Swiss Federal Railways.

== Services ==
As of the December 2021 timetable change, the following services stop at Bettlach:

- S20: half-hourly service between Biel/Bienne and Solothurn, with every other train continuing from Solothurn to Olten.
