= Bellach railway station =

Railway station in Switzerland

Bellach
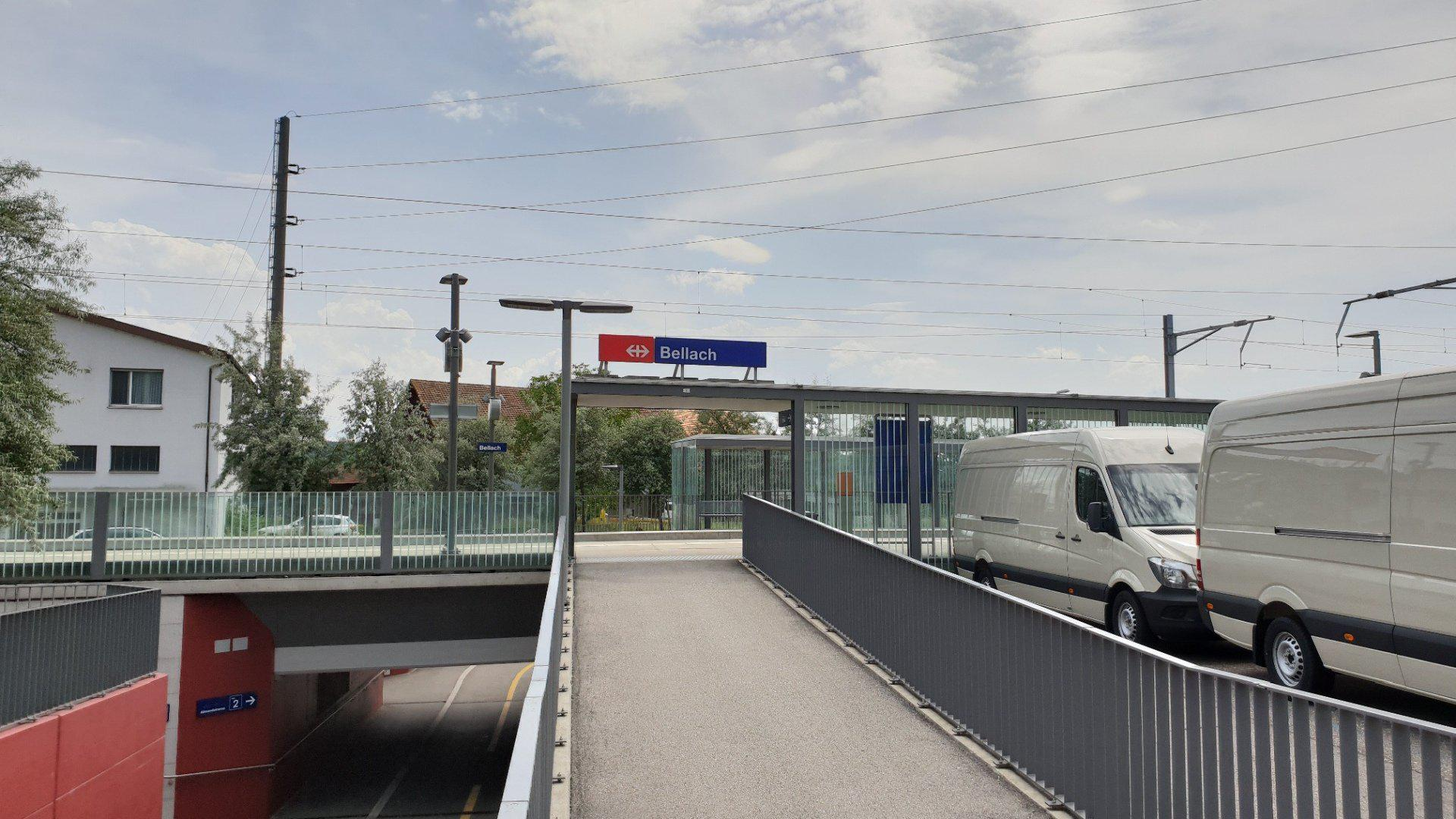
- The station platforms in 2018

General information
- Location: Bellach; Switzerland
- Coordinates: 47°13′N 7°30′E
- Owner: Swiss Federal Railways
- Line: Jura Foot line
- Train operators: Swiss Federal Railways
- Connections: Aare Seeland mobil buses

History
- Opened: 15 December 2013

Passengers
- 2018: 770 per weekday

Services
Preceding station	SBB CFF FFS	Following station
Selzach towards Biel/Bienne	S20	Solothurn Allmend towards Olten
Location
- Location within Switzerland Location within Canton of Solothurn

Bellach railway station (German: Bahnhof Bellach) is a railway station in the municipality of Bellach, in the Swiss canton of Solothurn. It is an intermediate stop on the standard gauge Jura Foot line of Swiss Federal Railways. The current station opened on 15 December 2013, replacing an older building to the west.

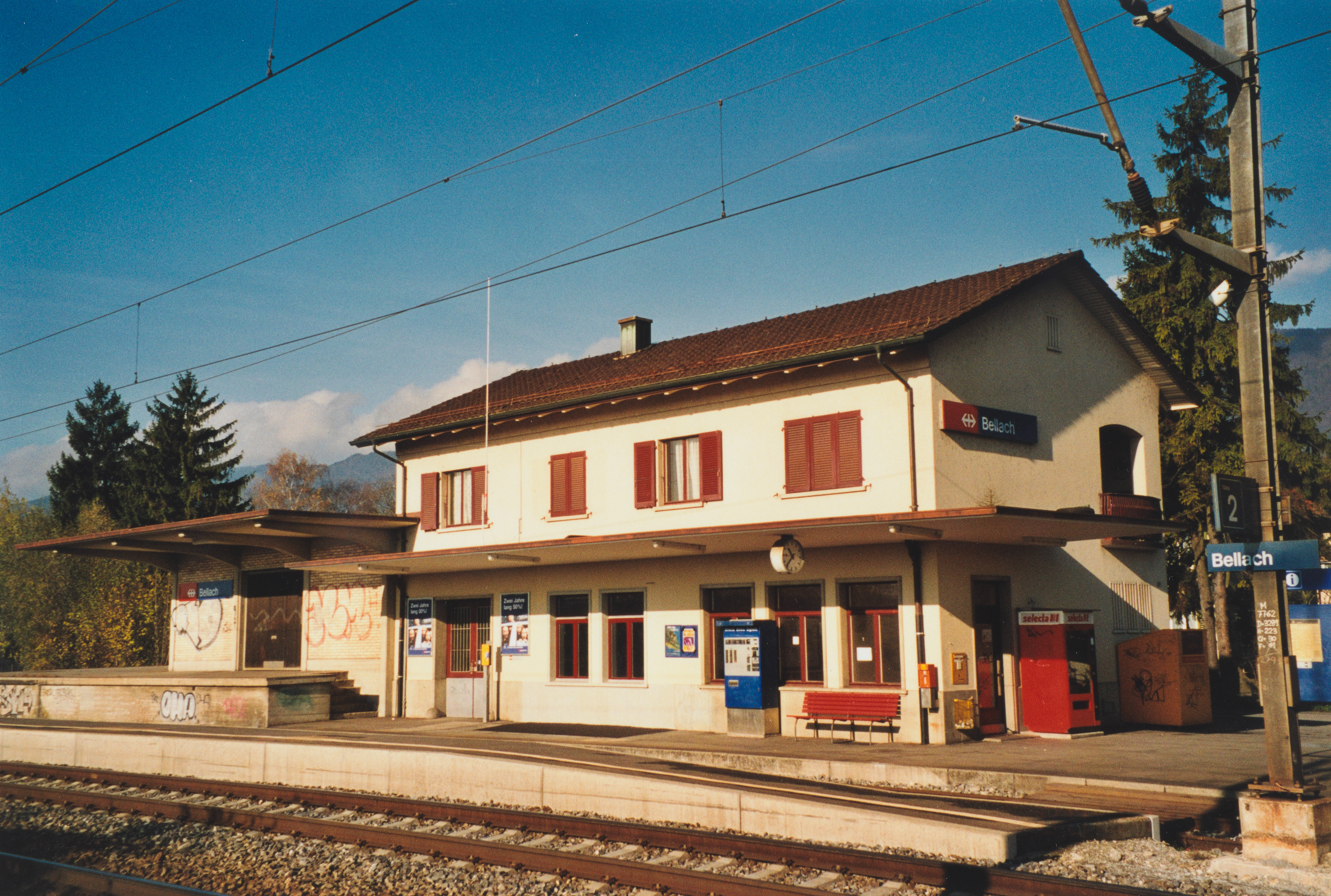
Former railway station building at 47.2085410°N 7.4952610°E (2000)

== Services ==
As of the December 2021 timetable change, the following services stop at Bellach:

- S20: half-hourly service between Biel/Bienne and Solothurn, with every other train continuing from Solothurn to Olten.
