= Selzach railway station =

Railway station in Switzerland

Selzach
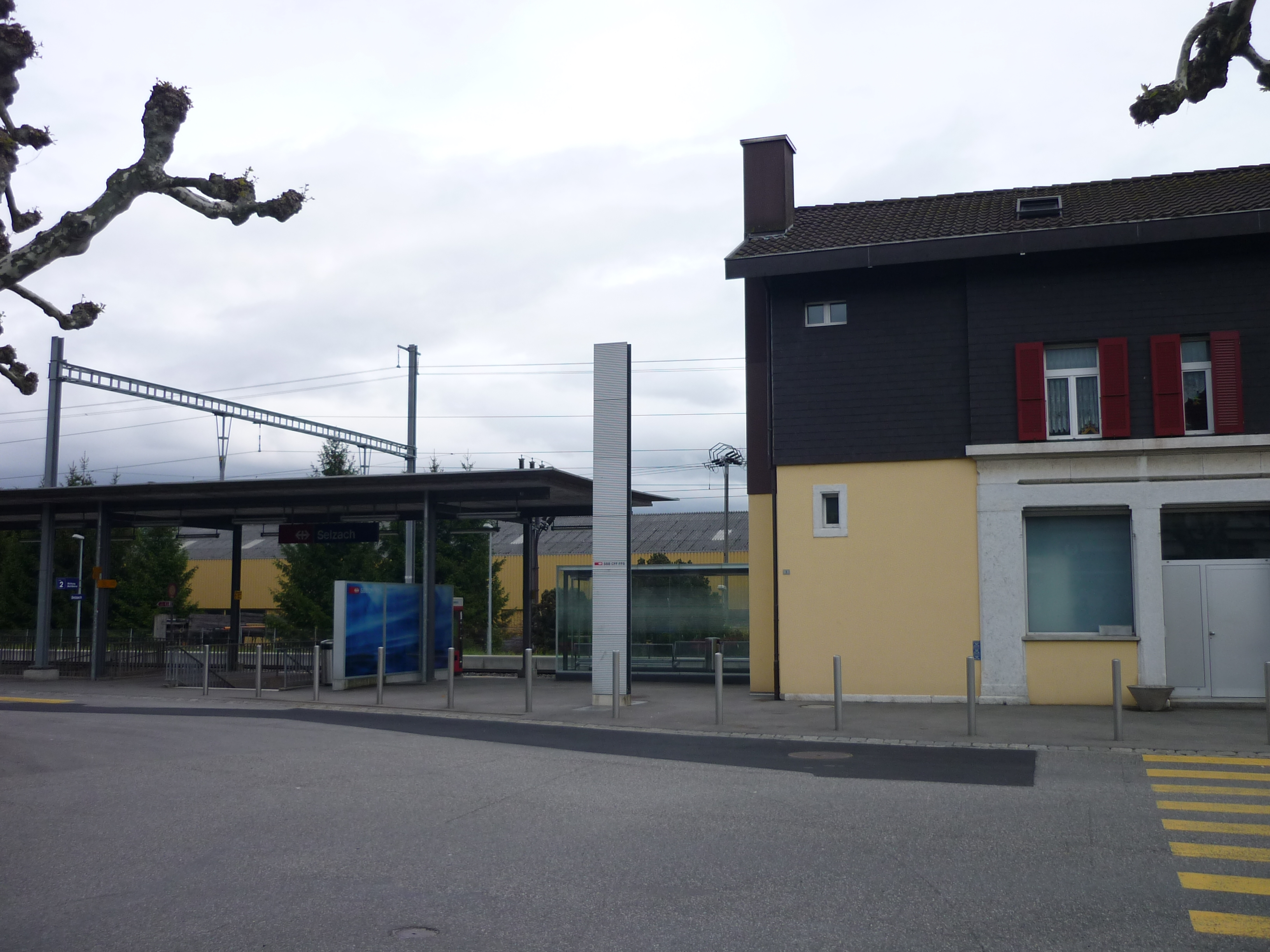
- The station in 2010

General information
- Location: Selzach; Switzerland
- Coordinates: 47°12′02″N 7°27′24″E
- Owner: Swiss Federal Railways
- Line: Jura Foot line
- Distance: 80.7 km (50.1 mi) from Basel SBB
- Train operators: Swiss Federal Railways
- Connections: Busbetrieb Grenchen und Umgebung buses

Other information
- Fare zone: 201 and 250 (Libero)

Passengers
- 2018: 990 per weekday

Services
Preceding station	SBB CFF FFS	Following station
Bettlach towards Biel/Bienne	S20	Bellach towards Olten
Location
- Location within Switzerland Location within Canton of Solothurn

Selzach railway station (German: Bahnhof Selzach) is a railway station in the municipality of Selzach, in the Swiss canton of Solothurn. It is an intermediate stop on the standard gauge Jura Foot line of Swiss Federal Railways.

== Services ==
As of the December 2021 timetable change, the following services stop at Selzach:

- S20: half-hourly service between Biel/Bienne and Solothurn, with every other train continuing from Solothurn to Olten.
