= Grosshöchstetten railway station =

Railway station in Grosshöchstetten, Switzerland

Grosshöchstetten
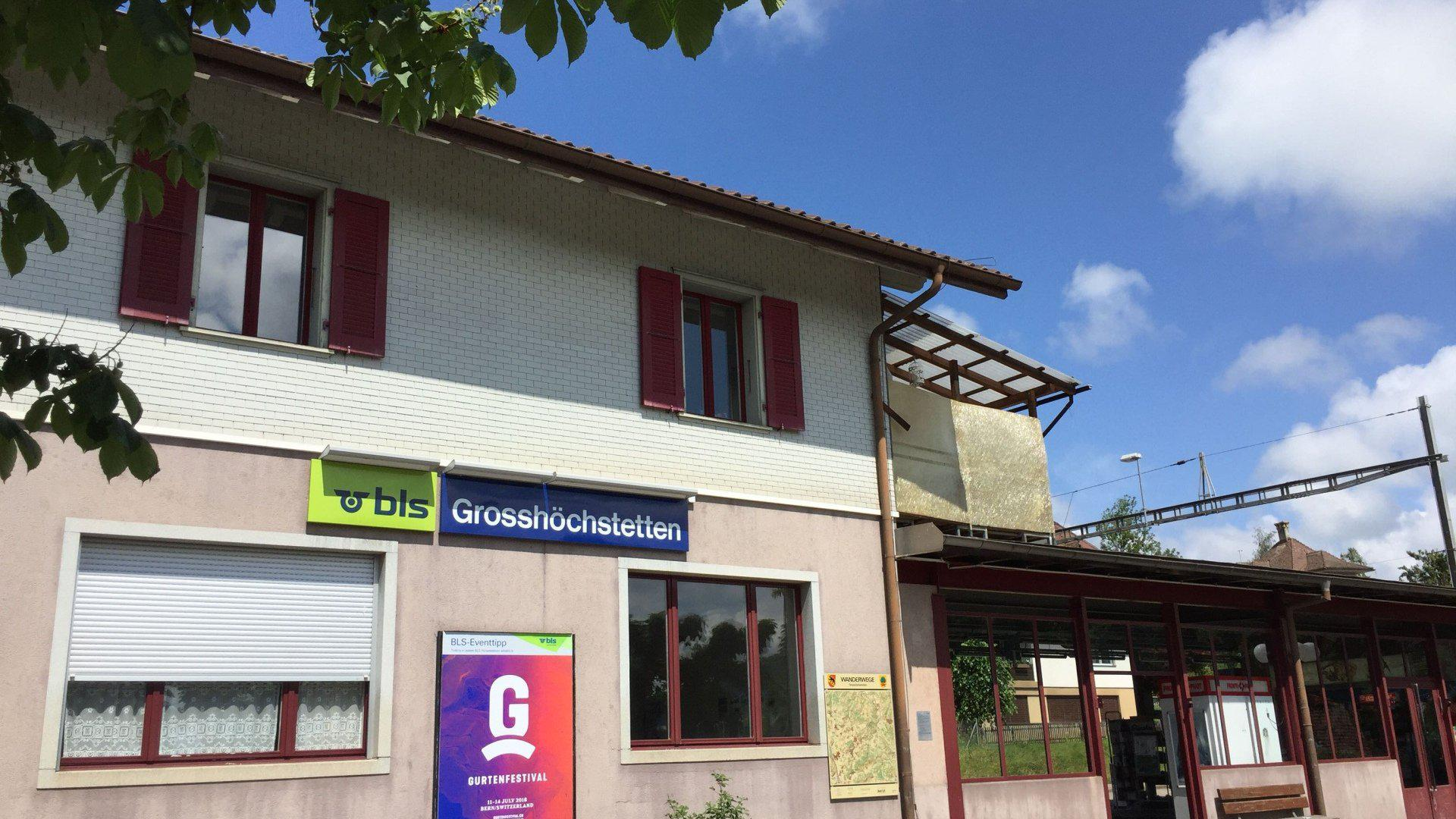
- The station building in 2018

General information
- Location: Grosshöchstetten; Switzerland
- Coordinates: 46°54′17″N 7°38′06″E
- Elevation: 742 m (2,434 ft)
- Owner: BLS AG
- Line: Burgdorf–Thun line
- Distance: 14.7 km (9.1 mi) from Hasle-Rüegsau
- Platforms: 1 side platform
- Tracks: 2
- Train operators: BLS AG
- Connections: PostAuto AG bus line

Construction
- Parking: Yes (8 spaces)
- Accessible: Yes

Other information
- Station code: 8508260 (GH)
- Fare zone: 130 (Libero)

Passengers
- 2023: 1'000 per weekday (BLS)

Services
Preceding station	Bern S-Bahn	Following station
Konolfingen towards Thun	S41	Biglen towards Solothurn
Konolfingen towards Thun	S42	Biglen towards Hasle-Rüegsau
Location

Grosshöchstetten railway station (German: Bahnhof Grosshöchstetten) is a railway station in the municipality of Grosshöchstetten, in the Swiss canton of Bern. It is located on the standard gauge Burgdorf–Thun line of BLS AG.

== Services ==
As of the December 2024 timetable change, the following services stop at Grosshöchstetten:

- Bern S-Bahn:
  - S41: hourly service between Thun and Solothurn.
  - S42: hourly service between Hasle-Rüegsau and Thun.
