= Bigenthal railway station =

Railway station in Walkringen, Switzerland

Bigenthal
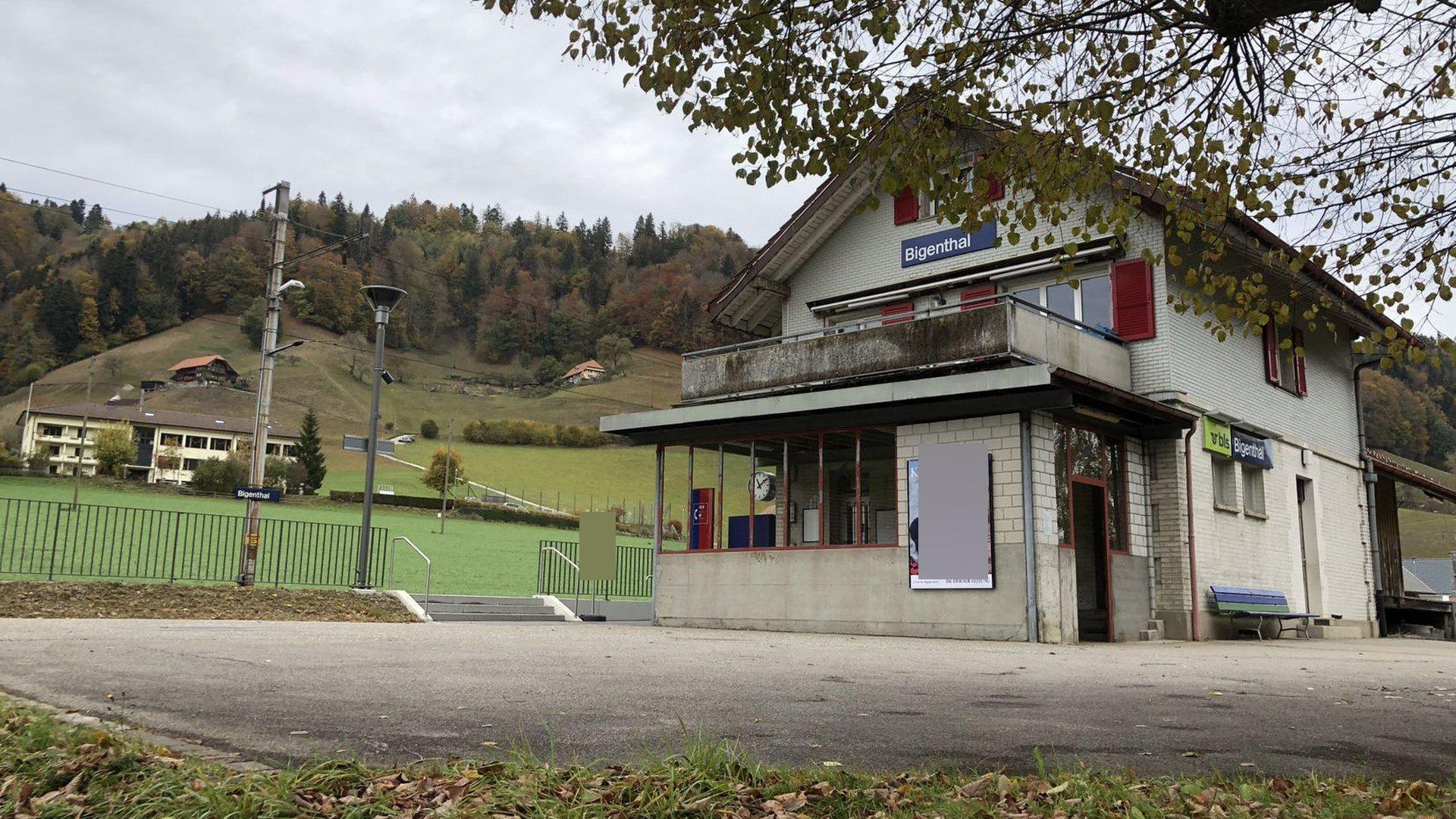
- The station building in 2018

General information
- Location: Walkringen; Switzerland
- Coordinates: 46°57′55″N 7°37′24″E
- Elevation: 675 m (2,215 ft)
- Owner: BLS AG
- Line: Burgdorf–Thun line
- Distance: 6.8 km (4.2 mi) from Hasle-Rüegsau
- Platforms: 1 side platform
- Tracks: 1
- Train operators: BLS AG

Construction
- Parking: Yes (8 spaces)
- Accessible: Yes

Other information
- Station code: 8508263 (BIGE)
- Fare zone: 146 and 156 (Libero)

Passengers
- 2023: 60 per weekday (BLS)

Services
Preceding station	Bern S-Bahn	Following station
Walkringen towards Thun	S41	Schafhausen i.E. towards Solothurn
Location

Bigenthal railway station (German: Bahnhof Bigenthal) is a railway station in the municipality of Walkringen, in the Swiss canton of Bern. It is located on the standard gauge Burgdorf–Thun line of BLS AG. This station is served as a request stop by local trains only.

== Services ==
As of the December 2024 timetable change, the following services stop at Bigenthal:

- Bern S-Bahn S41: hourly service between Thun and Solothurn.
