= Biglen railway station =

Railway station in Biglen, Switzerland

Biglen
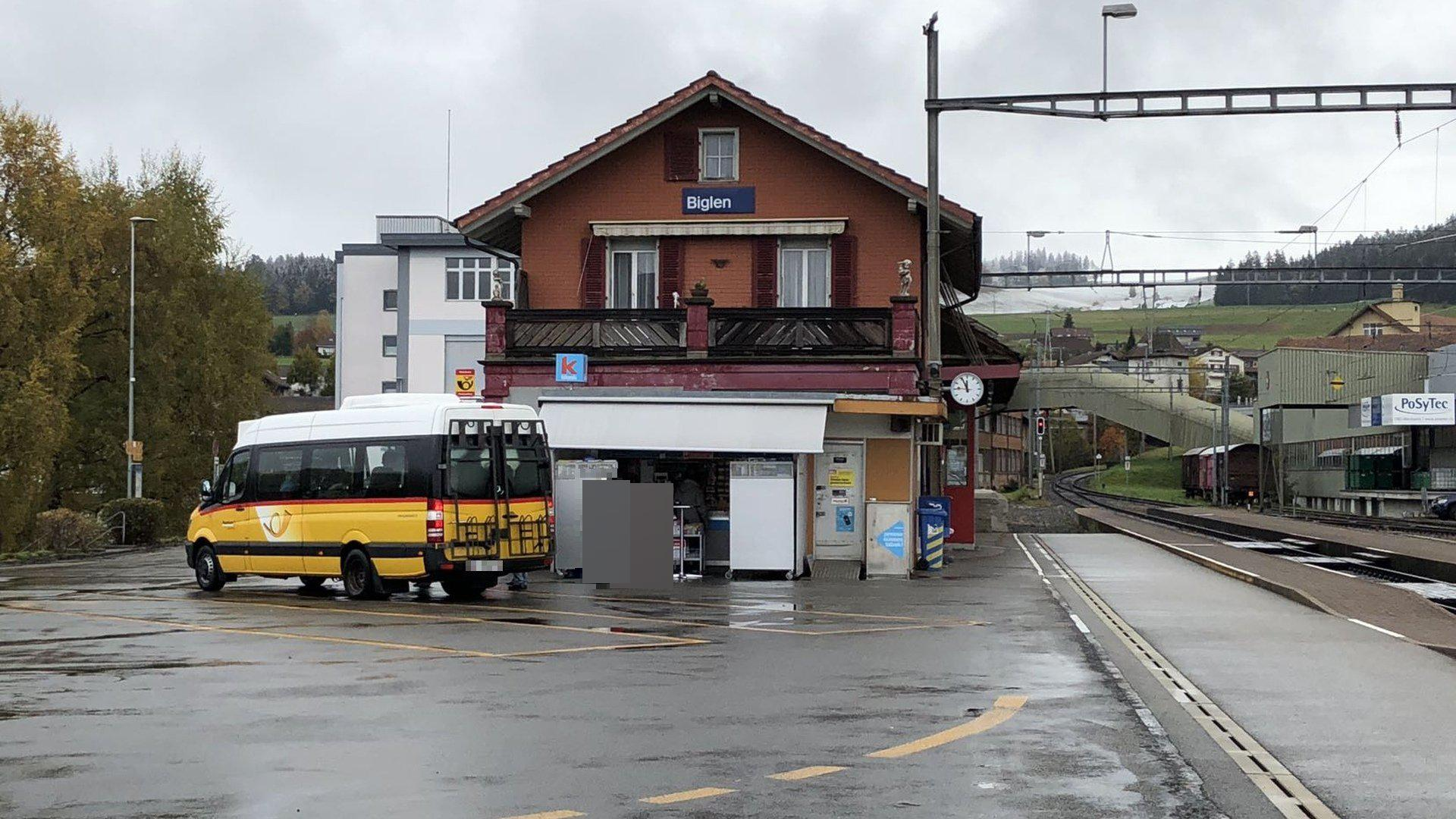
- The station building in 2018, prior to the rebuilding of the station

General information
- Location: Biglen; Switzerland
- Coordinates: 46°55′29″N 7°37′36″E
- Elevation: 739 m (2,425 ft)
- Owner: BLS AG
- Line: Burgdorf–Thun line
- Distance: 12.1 km (7.5 mi) from Hasle-Rüegsau
- Platforms: 1 side platform; 1 island platform
- Tracks: 3
- Train operators: BLS AG
- Connections: PostAuto AG bus lines

Construction
- Parking: Yes (12 spaces)
- Accessible: Yes

Other information
- Station code: 8508261 (BIG)
- Fare zone: 130 (Libero)

Passengers
- 2023: 550 per weekday (BLS)

Services
Preceding station	Bern S-Bahn	Following station
Walkringen towards Solothurn	S41	Grosshöchstetten towards Thun
Walkringen towards Hasle-Rüegsau	S42	Grosshöchstetten towards Thun
Location

Biglen railway station (German: Bahnhof Biglen) is a railway station in the municipality of Biglen, in the Swiss canton of Bern. It is located on the standard gauge Burgdorf–Thun line of BLS AG.

== Services ==
As of the December 2024 timetable change, the following services stop at Biglen:

- Bern S-Bahn:
  - S41: hourly service between Thun and Solothurn.
  - S42: hourly service between Hasle-Rüegsau and Thun.
