= Schafhausen i.E. railway station =

Railway station in Hasle bei Burgdorf, Switzerland

Schafhausen i.E.
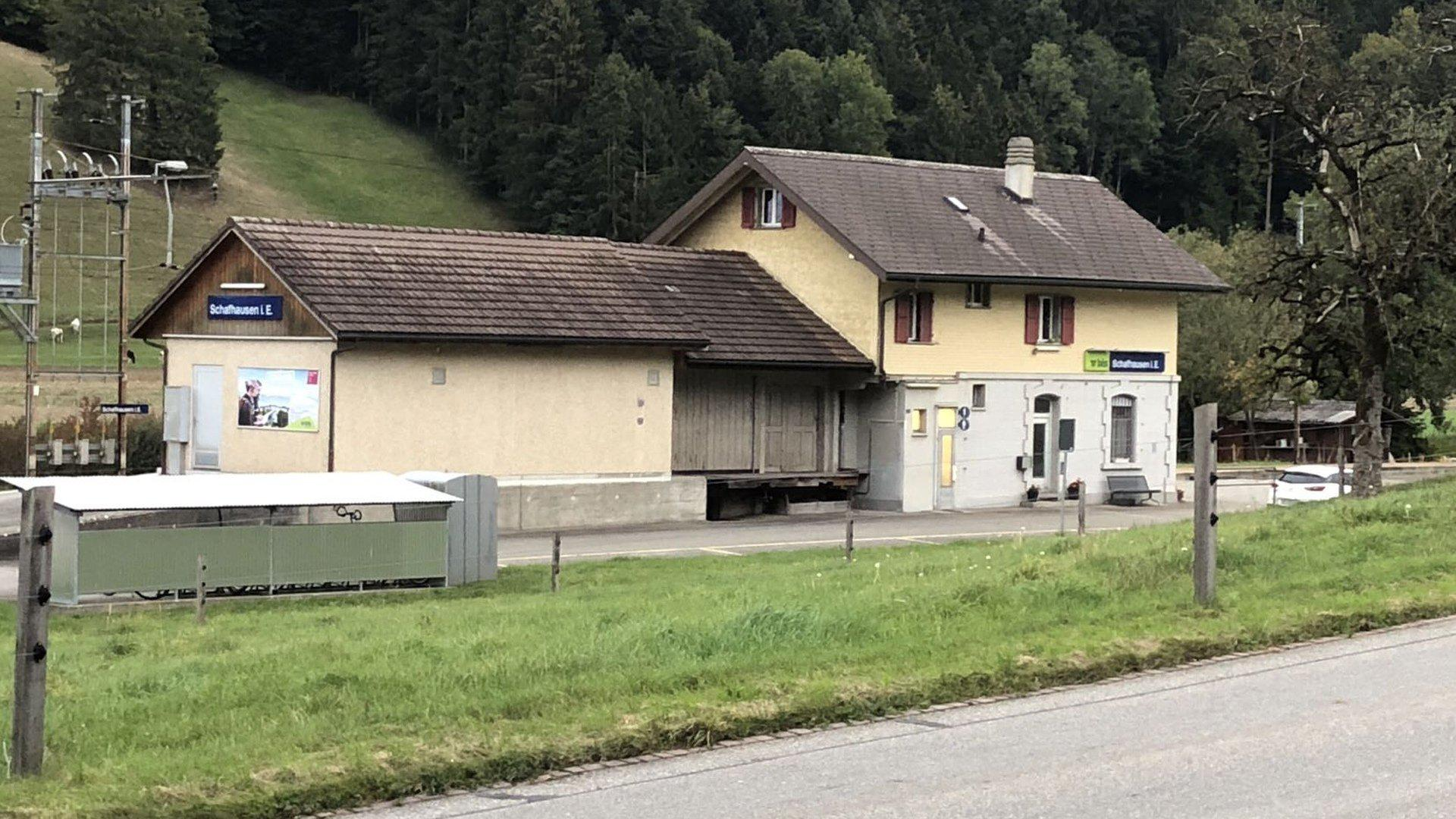
- The station building in 2018

General information
- Location: Hasle bei Burgdorf; Switzerland
- Coordinates: 46°59′40″N 7°39′24″E
- Elevation: 605 m (1,985 ft)
- Owner: BLS AG
- Line: Burgdorf–Thun line
- Distance: 2.6 km (1.6 mi) from Hasle-Rüegsau
- Platforms: 1 side platform
- Tracks: 2
- Train operators: BLS AG

Construction
- Parking: Yes (5 spaces)
- Accessible: Yes

Other information
- Station code: 8508264 (SHIE)
- Fare zone: 154 and 156 (Libero)

Passengers
- 2023: 150 per weekday (BLS)

Services
Preceding station	Bern S-Bahn	Following station
Bigenthal towards Thun	S41	Hasle-Rüegsau towards Solothurn
Location

Schafhausen i.E. railway station (German: Bahnhof Schafhausen i.E.), also known as Schafhausen im Emmental railway station, is a railway station in the municipality of Hasle bei Burgdorf, in the Swiss canton of Bern. It is located on the standard gauge Burgdorf–Thun line of BLS AG. This station is served as a request stop by local trains only.

== Services ==
As of the December 2024 timetable change, the following services stop at Schafhausen i.E.:

- Bern S-Bahn S41: hourly service between Thun and Solothurn.
