= Walkringen railway station =

Railway station in Walkringen, Switzerland

Walkringen
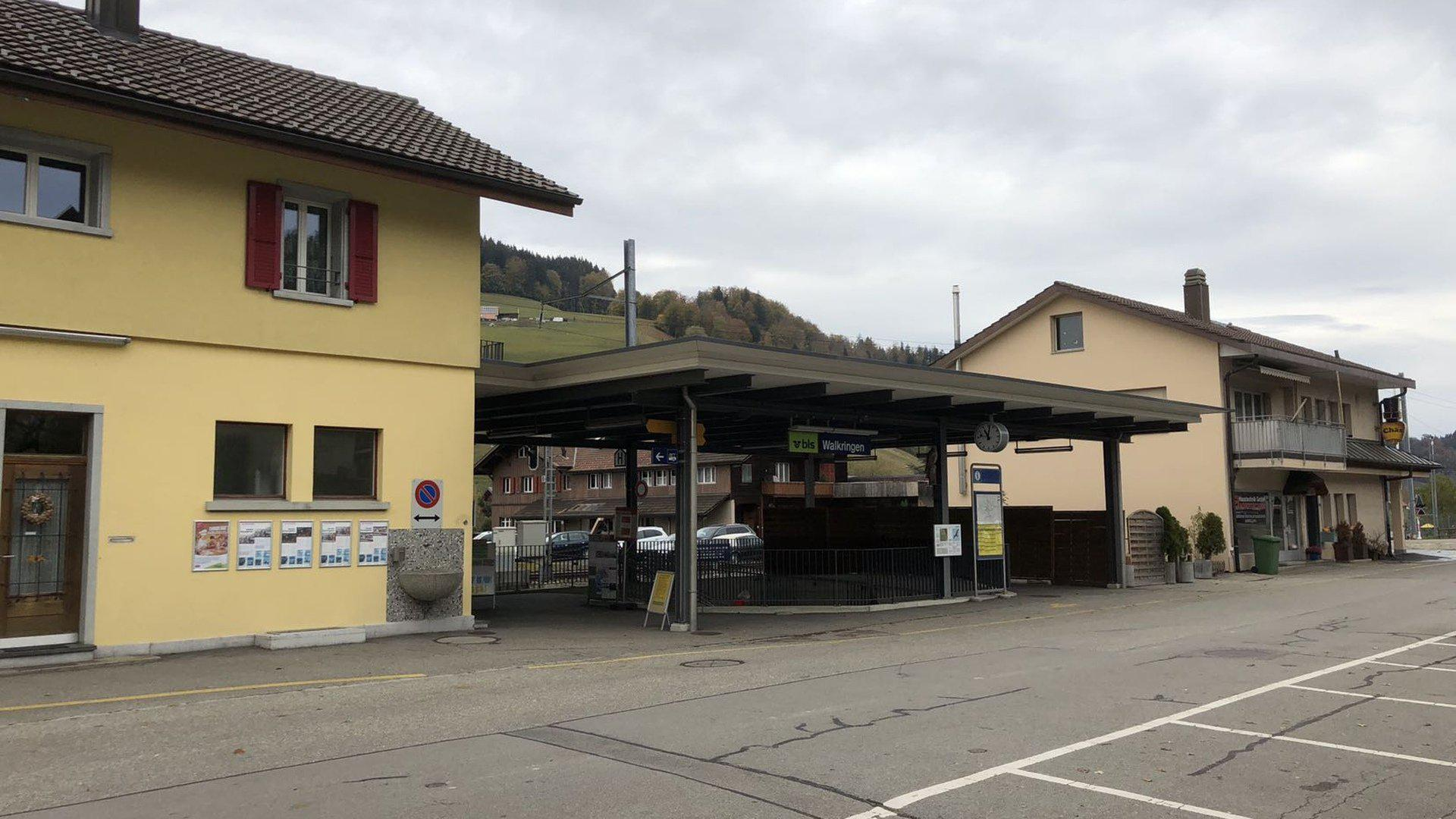
- The station building in 2018

General information
- Location: Walkringen; Switzerland
- Coordinates: 46°56′51″N 7°37′08″E
- Elevation: 690 m (2,260 ft)
- Owner: BLS AG
- Line: Burgdorf–Thun line
- Distance: 8.9 km (5.5 mi) from Hasle-Rüegsau
- Platforms: 2 (1 island platform)
- Train operators: BLS AG
- Connections: PostAuto AG bus line

Construction
- Accessible: Yes

Other information
- Station code: 8508262 (WALK)
- Fare zone: 146 (Libero)

Passengers
- 2023: 370 per weekday (BLS)

Services
Preceding station	Bern S-Bahn	Following station
Biglen towards Thun	S41	Bigenthal towards Solothurn
Biglen towards Thun	S42	Hasle-Rüegsau Terminus
Location

Walkringen railway station (German: Bahnhof Walkringen) is a railway station in the municipality of Walkringen, in the Swiss canton of Bern. It is located on the standard gauge Burgdorf–Thun line of BLS AG.

== Services ==
As of the December 2024 timetable change, the following services stop at Walkringen:

- Bern S-Bahn:
  - S41: hourly service between Thun and Solothurn.
  - S42: hourly service between Hasle-Rüegsau and Thun.
