= Landiswil =

- Municipality
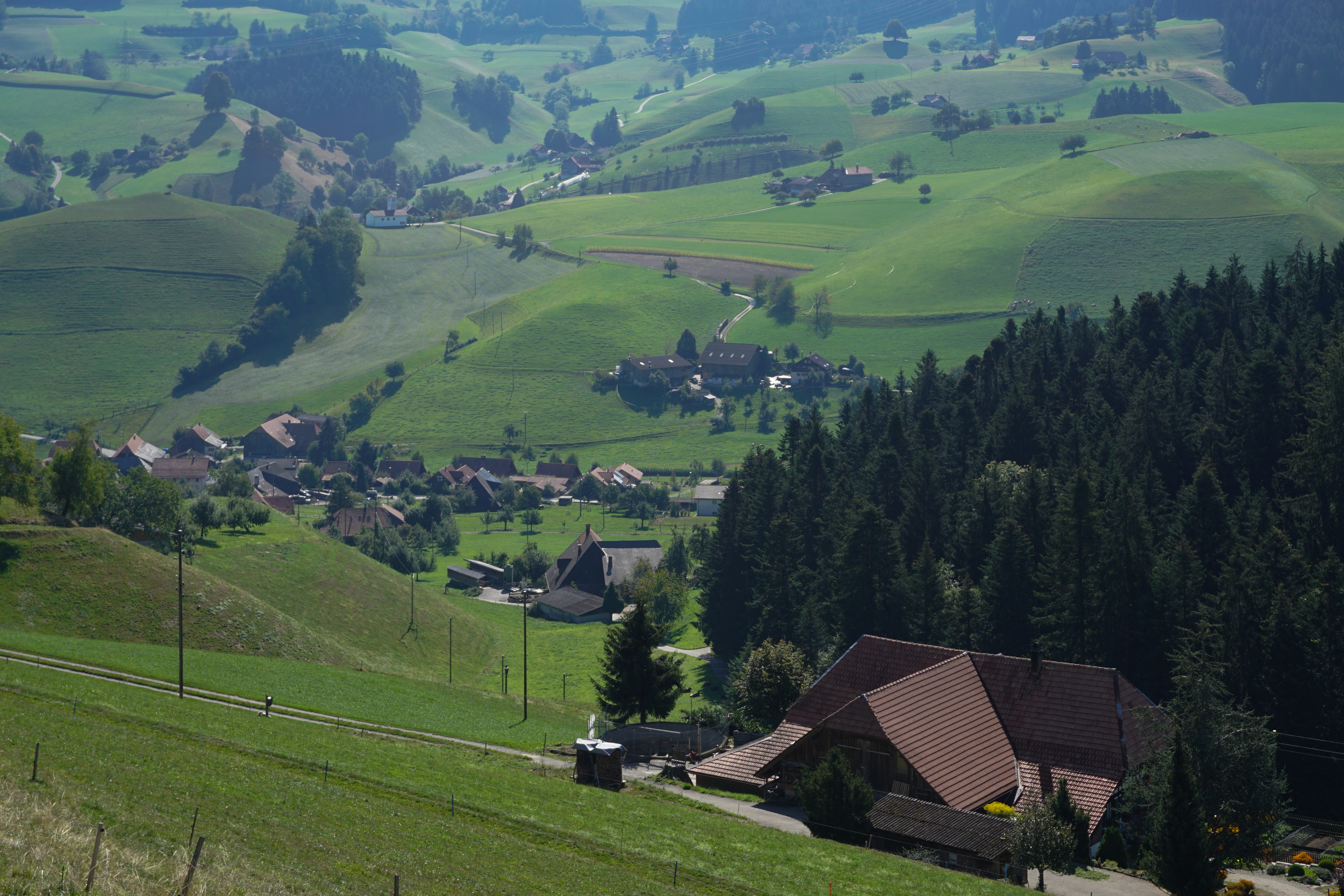
- View of Obergoldbach and Landiswil

- Flag Coat of arms
- Location of Landiswil
- Location within Switzerland Location within Canton of Bern
- Coordinates: 46°57′N 7°41′E
- Country: Switzerland
- Canton: Bern
- District: Bern-Mittelland

Government
  - Executive: Gemeinderat with 5 members
  - Mayor: Gemeindepräsident; Samuel Wittwer (as of 2026)

Area
  - Total: 10.3 km^{2} (4.0 sq mi)
- Elevation: 764 m (2,507 ft)

Population (December 2020)
  - Total: 619
  - Density: 60.1/km^{2} (156/sq mi)
- Time zone: UTC+01:00 (CET)
  - Summer (DST): UTC+02:00 (CEST)
- Postal code: 3434
- SFOS number: 613
- ISO 3166 code: CH-BE
- Localities: Obergoldbach, Landiswil
- Surrounded by: Arni, Lauperswil, Lützelflüh, Rüderswil, Walkringen
- Twin towns: Münchenbuchsee (Switzerland)
- Website: https://www.landiswil.ch/

Landiswil is a municipality in the Bern-Mittelland administrative district in the canton of Bern in Switzerland.

== History ==
Landiswil is first mentioned in 1277 as Landoloswile.

The oldest trace of a settlement are some scattered neolithic and Late Bronze Age artifacts. During the Middle Ages, the villages of Landiswil and Obergoldbach were both part of the parish of Biglen. The Durrach and Spiegelberg families from Solothurn owned the village of Landiswil until 1421 when it was given to the Niedern Spital in Bern. Obergoldbach was owned by several wealthy families from Bern, including, between 1469 and 1471, the Schultheiss Peter Kistler. In 1422 Bern combined the two villages into a single court. Then, in 1471 they combined the courts of Landiswil and Biglen and placed the new court under in the district of Konolfingen. In 1529 the combined court was placed under the authority of the Landvogt of Signau. The village of Landiswil remained part of the parish of Biglen until they built a village church in 1954. The village was home to two famous spas during the 19th century, the Tannental and the Löchlibad, but both closed by the early 20th century.

== Geography ==
Landiswil has an area of 10.26 km^{2} (3.96 sq mi). Of this area, 6.4 km^{2} (2.5 mi^{2}) or 62.4% is used for agricultural purposes, while 3.33 km^{2} (1.29 mi^{2}) or 32.5% is forested. Of the rest of the land, 0.51 km^{2} (0.20 mi^{2}) or 5.0% is settled (buildings or roads), 0.03 km^{2} (7.4 acres) or 0.3% is either rivers or lakes.

Of the built up area, housing and buildings made up 2.5% and transportation infrastructure made up 1.7%. Out of the forested land, 30.5% of the total land area is heavily forested and 1.9% is covered with orchards or small clusters of trees. Of the agricultural land, 20.3% is used for growing crops and 39.8% is pastures, while 2.3% is used for orchards or vine crops. All the water in the municipality is flowing water.

It is located in the upper Goldbach Valley and includes the villages of Landiswil and Obergoldbach as well as individual farm houses.

On 31 December 2009 Amtsbezirk Konolfingen, the municipality's former district, was dissolved. On the following day, 1 January 2010, it joined the newly created Verwaltungskreis Bern-Mittelland.

== Coat of arms ==
The blazon of the municipal coat of arms is Per pale Gules and Argent overall a Fir Tree Vert issuant from a Mount of 3 Coupeaux of the same and in chief dexter letter L Or and in sinister a Mullet of the last.

== Demographics ==
Landiswil has a population (as of December 2020) of 619. As of 2010, 1.6% of the population are resident foreign nationals. Over the last 10 years (2001-2011) the population has changed at a rate of 0.8%. Migration accounted for 0.6%, while births and deaths accounted for -0.2%. Most of the population (as of 2000) speaks German (652 or 99.5%) as their first language, Serbo-Croatian is the second most common (2 or 0.3%) and Spanish is the third (1 or 0.2%).

As of 2008, the population was 49.9% male and 50.1% female. The population was made up of 311 Swiss men (49.6% of the population) and 2 (0.3%) non-Swiss men. There were 306 Swiss women (48.8%) and 8 (1.3%) non-Swiss women. Of the population in the municipality, 329 or about 50.2% were born in Landiswil and lived there in 2000. There were 257 or 39.2% who were born in the same canton, while 28 or 4.3% were born somewhere else in Switzerland, and 8 or 1.2% were born outside of Switzerland.

As of 2011, children and teenagers (0–19 years old) make up 21.5% of the population, while adults (20–64 years old) make up 57.8% and seniors (over 64 years old) make up 20.7%.

As of 2000, there were 282 people who were single and never married in the municipality. There were 321 married individuals, 35 widows or widowers and 17 individuals who are divorced.

As of 2000, there were 48 households that consist of only one person and 35 households with five or more people. In 2000, a total of 224 apartments (89.2% of the total) were permanently occupied, while 19 apartments (7.6%) were seasonally occupied and 8 apartments (3.2%) were empty. As of 2010, the construction rate of new housing units was 1.6 new units per 1000 residents. The vacancy rate for the municipality, in 2011, was 2.46%.

The historical population is given in the following chart:

== Politics ==
In the 2011 federal election the most popular party was the Swiss People's Party (SVP) which received 61.9% of the vote. The next three most popular parties were the Conservative Democratic Party (BDP) (16%), the Social Democratic Party (SP) (6.8%) and the Green Party (4%). In the federal election, a total of 279 votes were cast, and the voter turnout was 51.5%.

== Economy ==
As of 2011, Landiswil had an unemployment rate of 0.99%. As of 2008, there were a total of 264 people employed in the municipality. Of these, there were 182 people employed in the primary economic sector and about 61 businesses involved in this sector. 41 people were employed in the secondary sector and there were 9 businesses in this sector. 41 people were employed in the tertiary sector, with 10 businesses in this sector. There were 323 residents of the municipality who were employed in some capacity, of which females made up 37.8% of the workforce.

In 2008 there were a total of 179 full-time equivalent jobs. The number of jobs in the primary sector was 116, of which 108 were in agriculture and 8 were in forestry or lumber production. The number of jobs in the secondary sector was 36 of which 12 or (33.3%) were in manufacturing, 1 was in mining and 23 (63.9%) were in construction. The number of jobs in the tertiary sector was 27. In the tertiary sector; 3 or 11.1% were in wholesale or retail sales or the repair of motor vehicles, 3 or 11.1% were in the movement and storage of goods, 11 or 40.7% were in a hotel or restaurant, 8 or 29.6% were in education.

In 2000, there were 29 workers who commuted into the municipality and 154 workers who commuted away. The municipality is a net exporter of workers, with about 5.3 workers leaving the municipality for every one entering. Of the working population, 5.3% used public transportation to get to work, and 45.8% used a private car.

== Religion ==
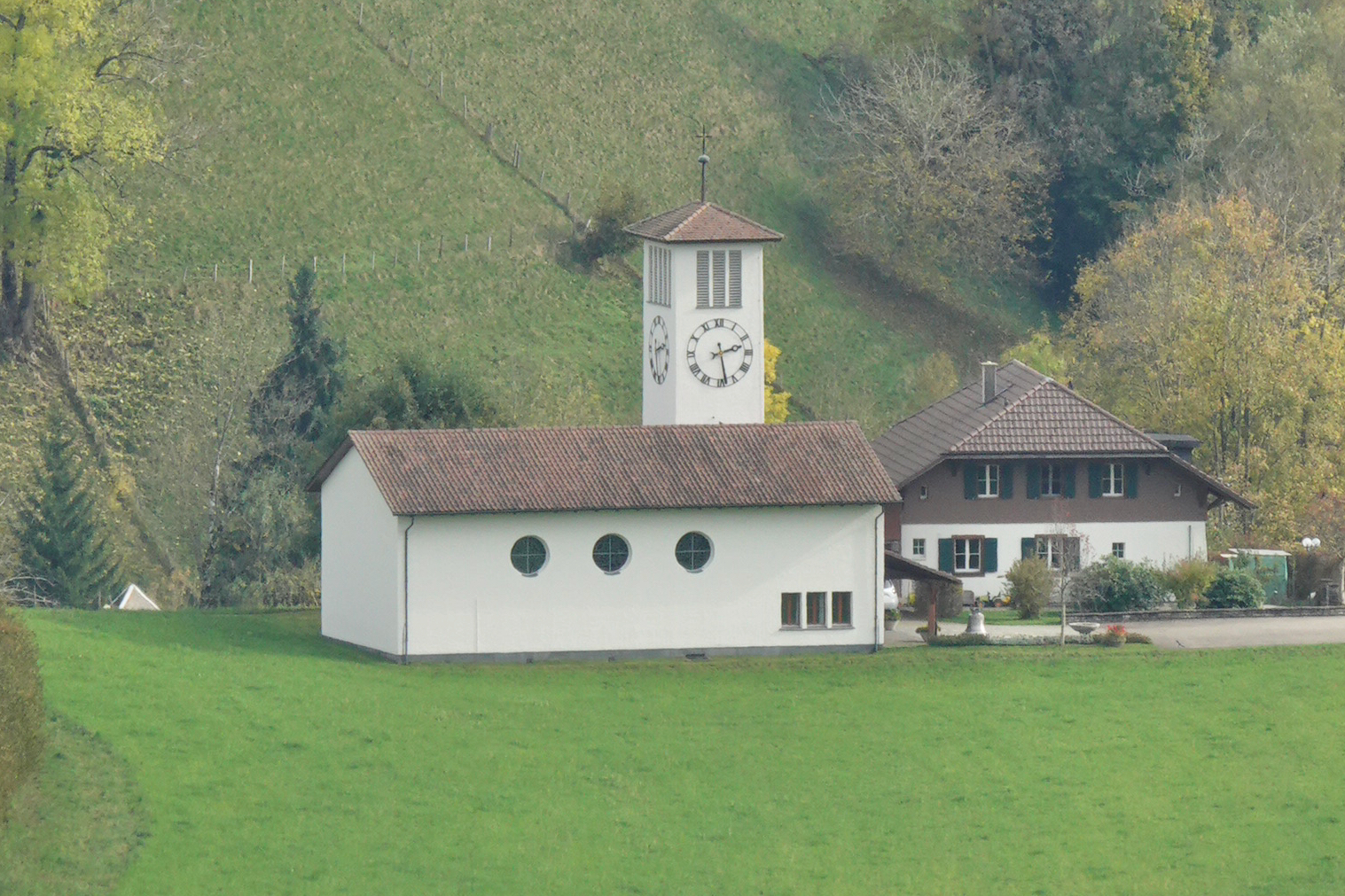
Church building in Landiswil

From the 2000 census, 571 or 87.2% belonged to the Swiss Reformed Church, while 10 or 1.5% were Roman Catholic. Of the rest of the population, there were 30 individuals (or about 4.58% of the population) who belonged to another Christian church. There was 1 individual who was Islamic. 22 (or about 3.36% of the population) belonged to no church, are agnostic or atheist, and 36 individuals (or about 5.50% of the population) did not answer the question.

== Education ==
In Landiswil about 209 or (31.9%) of the population have completed non-mandatory upper secondary education, and 53 or (8.1%) have completed additional higher education (either university or a Fachhochschule). Of the 53 who completed tertiary schooling, 58.5% were Swiss men, 41.5% were Swiss women.

The Canton of Bern school system provides one year of non-obligatory Kindergarten, followed by six years of Primary school. This is followed by three years of obligatory lower Secondary school where the students are separated according to ability and aptitude. Following the lower Secondary students may attend additional schooling or they may enter an apprenticeship.

During the 2010–11 school year, there were a total of 66 students attending classes in Landiswil. There was one kindergarten class with a total of 10 students in the municipality. Of the kindergarten students, 10.0% have a different mother language than the classroom language. The municipality had 2 primary classes and 37 students. During the same year, there was one lower secondary class with a total of 19 students.

As of 2000, there were 30 students from Landiswil who attended schools outside the municipality.
