= Rüderswil =

- Municipality
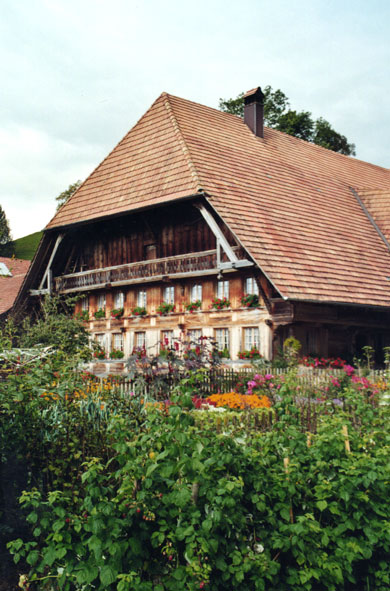
- A farm house in the Zollbrück village in Rüderswil

- Flag Coat of arms
- Location of Rüderswil
- Location within Switzerland Location within Canton of Bern
- Coordinates: 46°59′N 7°43′E
- Country: Switzerland
- Canton: Bern
- District: Emmental

Government
  - Executive: Gemeinderat with 5 members
  - Mayor: Gemeindepräsident(in); Peter Berger (as of 2026)

Area
  - Total: 17.2 km^{2} (6.6 sq mi)
- Elevation: 655 m (2,149 ft)

Population (December 2020)
  - Total: 2,373
  - Density: 138/km^{2} (357/sq mi)
- Time zone: UTC+01:00 (CET)
  - Summer (DST): UTC+02:00 (CEST)
- Postal code: 3437
- SFOS number: 905
- ISO 3166 code: CH-BE
- Surrounded by: Hasle bei Burgdorf, Landiswil, Lauperswil, Lützelflüh, Trachselwald
- Website: www.ruederswil.ch

Rüderswil is a municipality in the administrative district of Emmental in the canton of Bern in Switzerland.

== History ==
Aerial view (1950)

Rüderswil is first mentioned in 1139 as Rüderswile.

The oldest traces of settlements in the area are three high medieval castles in the hills above the modern town. A knight, Adalbert von Rüderswil, was mentioned in 1146, though little is known about the local noble family. By the Late Middle Ages, the Teutonic Knights were a major landholder in the Rüderswil Herrschaft. The village church was first mentioned in 1275. The current church tower was built in the second half of the 14th century and the late-Gothic choir was built in the 15th century. In 1528, Bern adopted the new faith of the Protestant Reformation and Rüderswil converted along with the rest of the canton.

Rüderswil and the surrounding villages remained completely rural and agrarian until the 18th century, when the canvas-weaving cottage industry developed. A cheese factory opened in Rüderswil in 1853, followed by a spinning mill in Schachen in 1869. In 1881, a railroad station opened in Rüderswil. The station and the Emmental Valley Road in 1899 brought industry to the settlement on the right bank of the river, while the left bank remained dominated by agriculture. By 2005, about 42% of jobs in the municipality were still in agriculture, while only 25% were in industry. In 2009, an attempt to merge Rüderswil and Lauperswil was rejected by voters in Lauperswil.

== Geography ==
Rüderswil has an area of 17.21 km^{2} (6.64 sq mi). As of 2012, a total of 11.7 km^{2} (4.5 mi^{2}) or 68.1% was used for agricultural purposes, while 4.07 km^{2} (1.57 mi^{2}) or 23.7% were forested. The rest of the municipality was 1.24 km^{2} (0.48 mi^{2}) or 7.2% settled (buildings or roads), 0.17 km^{2} (0.066 mi^{2}) or 1.0% is either rivers or lakes.

During the same year, housing and buildings made up 4.1% and transportation infrastructure made up 2.7%. A total of 21.8% of the total land area was heavily forested and 1.9% was covered with orchards or small clusters of trees. Of the agricultural land, 29.1% was used for growing crops and 36.9% was pasturage, while 2.2% was used for orchards or vine crops. All the water in the municipality is flowing water.

The municipality is located on a terrace above the left bank of the Emme River. It includes the village of Rüderswil, parts of the villages Schwanden im Emmental, Ranflüh, and Zollbrück, as well as scattered houses and hamlets on both sides of the Emme. In 1889, the Wittenbachviertel (Wittenbach quarter) went to Lauperswil, and in 1894, Häleschwand went to Signau.

On 31 December 2009, Amtsbezirk Signau, the municipality's former district, was dissolved. On the following day, 1 January 2010, it joined the newly created Verwaltungskreis Emmental.

== Coat of arms ==
The blazon of the municipal coat of arms is Per fess Argent and Gules overall a Lion rampant counterchanged.

== Demographics ==
Rüderswil has a population (as of December 2020) of 2,373. As of 2012, 2.4% of the population are resident foreign nationals. Between the last 2 years (2010-2012) the population changed at a rate of -0.2%. Migration accounted for -2.4%, while births and deaths accounted for 0.0%.

Most of the population (as of 2000) speaks German (2,216 or 98.1%) as their first language, Albanian is the second most common (22 or 1.0%) and French is the third (3 or 0.1%). There are 3 people who speak Italian and 2 people who speak Romansh.

As of 2008, the population was 49.7% male and 50.3% female. The population was made up of 1,154 Swiss men (48.5% of the population) and 30 (1.3%) non-Swiss men. There were 1,181 Swiss women (49.6%) and 16 (0.7%) non-Swiss women. Of the population in the municipality, 931 or about 41.2% were born in Rüderswil and lived there in 2000. There were 983 or 43.5% who were born in the same canton, while 186 or 8.2% were born somewhere else in Switzerland, and 80 or 3.5% were born outside of Switzerland.

As of 2012, children and teenagers (0–19 years old) make up 23.2% of the population, while adults (20–64 years old) make up 58.9% and seniors (over 64 years old) make up 17.9%.

As of 2000, there were 948 people who were single and never married in the municipality. There were 1,108 married individuals, 138 widows or widowers and 64 individuals who are divorced.

As of 2010, there were 275 households that consist of only one person and 80 households with five or more people. In 2000, a total of 838 apartments (90.1% of the total) were permanently occupied, while 65 apartments (7.0%) were seasonally occupied and 27 apartments (2.9%) were empty. As of 2012, the construction rate of new housing units was 0.4 new units per 1000 residents. The vacancy rate for the municipality, in 2013, was 2.3%. In 2011, single family homes made up 35.4% of the total housing in the municipality.

The historical population is given in the following chart:

== Economy ==
As of 2011, Rüderswil had an unemployment rate of 1.45%. As of 2011, there were a total of 814 people employed in the municipality. Of these, there were 252 people employed in the primary economic sector and about 91 businesses involved in this sector. 200 people were employed in the secondary sector and there were 44 businesses in this sector. 362 people were employed in the tertiary sector, with 88 businesses in this sector. There were 1,201 residents of the municipality who were employed in some capacity, of which females made up 41.5% of the workforce.

In 2008 there were a total of 536 full-time equivalent jobs. The number of jobs in the primary sector was 174, all of which were in agriculture. The number of jobs in the secondary sector was 169 of which 99 or (58.6%) were in manufacturing and 70 (41.4%) were in construction. The number of jobs in the tertiary sector was 193. In the tertiary sector; 39 or 20.2% were in wholesale or retail sales or the repair of motor vehicles, 31 or 16.1% were in the movement and storage of goods, 13 or 6.7% were in a hotel or restaurant, 14 or 7.3% were in the information industry, 3 or 1.6% were the insurance or financial industry, 27 or 14.0% were technical professionals or scientists, 18 or 9.3% were in education and 27 or 14.0% were in health care.

In 2000, there were 231 workers who commuted into the municipality and 809 workers who commuted away. The municipality is a net exporter of workers, with about 3.5 workers leaving the municipality for every one entering. A total of 392 workers (62.9% of the 623 total workers in the municipality) both lived and worked in Rüderswil. Of the working population, 9.9% used public transportation to get to work, and 58.2% used a private car.

In 2011 the average local and cantonal tax rate on a married resident, with two children, of Rüderswil making 150,000 CHF was 12.4%, while an unmarried resident's rate was 18.2%. For comparison, the average rate for the entire canton in the same year, was 14.2% and 22.0%, while the nationwide average was 12.3% and 21.1% respectively.

In 2009 there were a total of 982 tax payers in the municipality. Of that total, 240 made over 75,000 CHF per year. There were 14 people who made between 15,000 and 20,000 per year. The greatest number of workers, 271, made between 50,000 and 75,000 CHF per year. The average income of the over 75,000 CHF group in Rüderswil was 105,098 CHF, while the average across all of Switzerland was 130,478 CHF.

In 2011 a total of 2.8% of the population received direct financial assistance from the government.

== Sights ==
The entire village of Rüderswil, the village of Ranflüh (including Lützelflüh and Rüderswil) and the hamlet of Ried are designated as parts of the Inventory of Swiss Heritage Sites.

== Politics ==
In the 2011 federal election the most popular party was the Swiss People's Party (SVP) which received 42.9% of the vote. The next three most popular parties were the Conservative Democratic Party (BDP) (21.6%), the Social Democratic Party (SP) (9.8%) and the Federal Democratic Union of Switzerland (EDU) (4.7%). In the federal election, a total of 843 votes were cast, and the voter turnout was 44.1%.

== Religion ==
From the 2000 census, 1,925 or 85.3% belonged to the Swiss Reformed Church, while 66 or 2.9% were Roman Catholic. Of the rest of the population, there were 3 members of an Orthodox church (or about 0.13% of the population), and there were 100 individuals (or about 4.43% of the population) who belonged to another Christian church. There were 45 (or about 1.99% of the population) who were Muslim. There were 2 individuals who belonged to another church. 55 (or about 2.44% of the population) belonged to no church, are agnostic or atheist, and 62 individuals (or about 2.75% of the population) did not answer the question.

== Education ==
In Rüderswil about 55.4% of the population have completed non-mandatory upper secondary education, and 15.3% have completed additional higher education (either university or a Fachhochschule). Of the 195 who had completed some form of tertiary schooling listed in the census, 71.8% were Swiss men, 24.6% were Swiss women and 3.1% were non-Swiss women.

The Canton of Bern school system provides one year of non-obligatory Kindergarten, followed by six years of Primary school. This is followed by three years of obligatory lower Secondary school where the students are separated according to ability and aptitude. Following the lower Secondary students may attend additional schooling or they may enter an apprenticeship.

During the 2012-13 school year, there were a total of 230 students attending classes in Rüderswil. There were a total of 38 students in the German language kindergarten classes in the municipality. The municipality's primary school had 141 students in German language classes. Of the primary students, 0.7% were permanent or temporary residents of Switzerland (not citizens) and 0.7% have a different mother language than the classroom language. During the same year, the lower secondary school had a total of 51 students. There were 2.0% who were permanent or temporary residents of Switzerland (not citizens) and 2.0% have a different mother language than the classroom language.

As of 2000, there were a total of 237 students attending any school in the municipality. Of those, 190 both lived and attended school in the municipality, while 47 students came from another municipality. During the same year, 128 residents attended schools outside the municipality.

== Notable residents ==
- Niklaus Leuenberger, (c. 1615 – 27 August 1653) a leader of the Swiss peasant war of 1653 was born in Rüderswil. A statue was erected in Rüderswil in 1903 on the 250th Anniversary of his death.
