= Biglen =

- Municipality
- Flag Coat of arms
- Location of Biglen
- Location within Switzerland Location within Canton of Bern
- Coordinates: 46°55′N 7°37′E
- Country: Switzerland
- Canton: Bern
- District: Bern-Mittelland administrative district

Government
  - Executive: Gemeinderat with 9 members
  - Mayor: Gemeindepräsident; Urs Schweizer (as of 2026)

Area
  - Total: 3.61 km^{2} (1.39 sq mi)
- Elevation: 739 m (2,425 ft)

Population (December 2020)
  - Total: 1,847
  - Density: 512/km^{2} (1,330/sq mi)
- Time zone: UTC+01:00 (CET)
  - Summer (DST): UTC+02:00 (CEST)
- Postal code: 3507
- SFOS number: 603
- ISO 3166 code: CH-BE
- Surrounded by: Arni, Grosshöchstetten, Schlosswil, Walkringen, Worb
- Website: www.biglen.ch

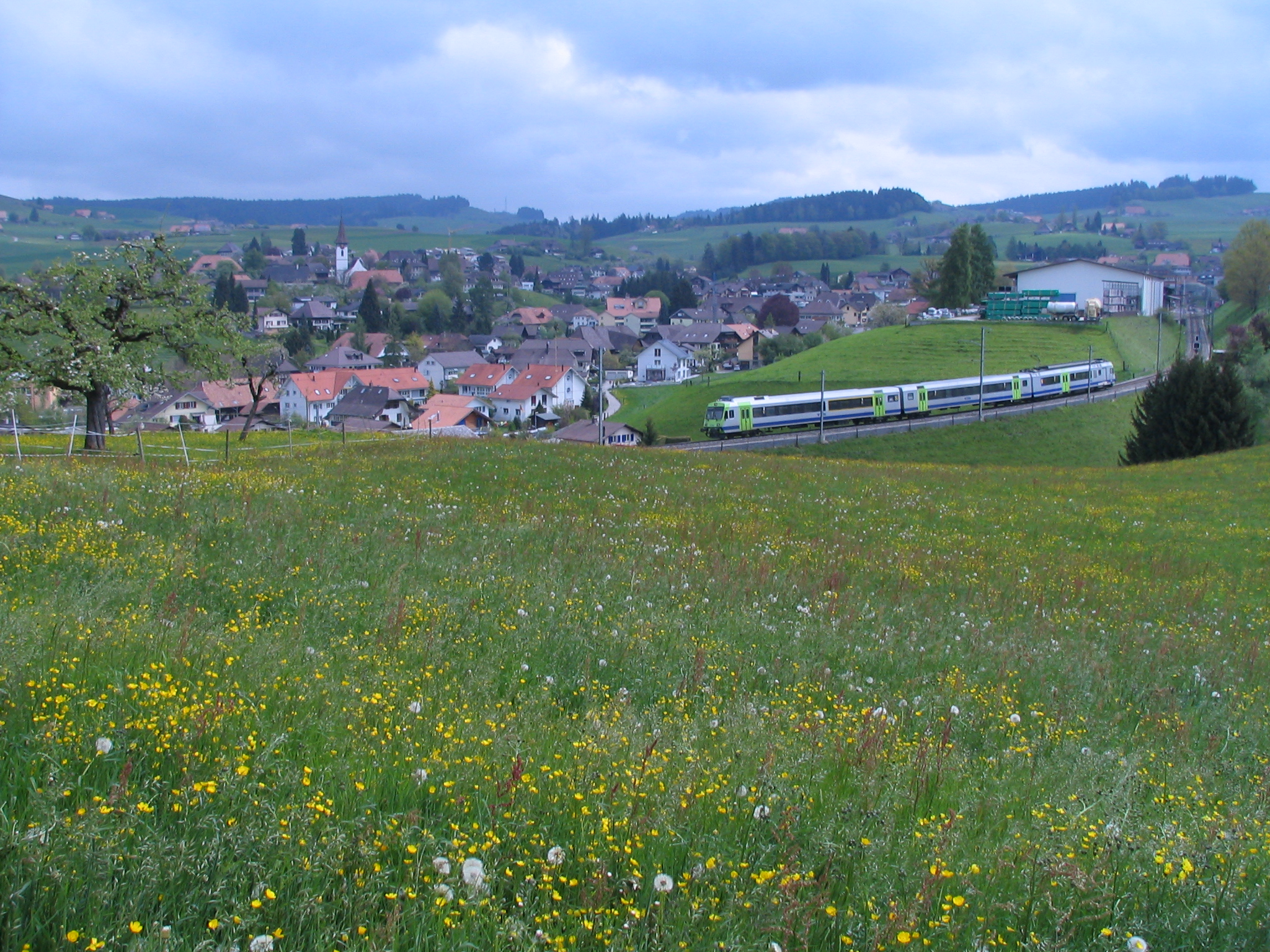
Biglen seen from West

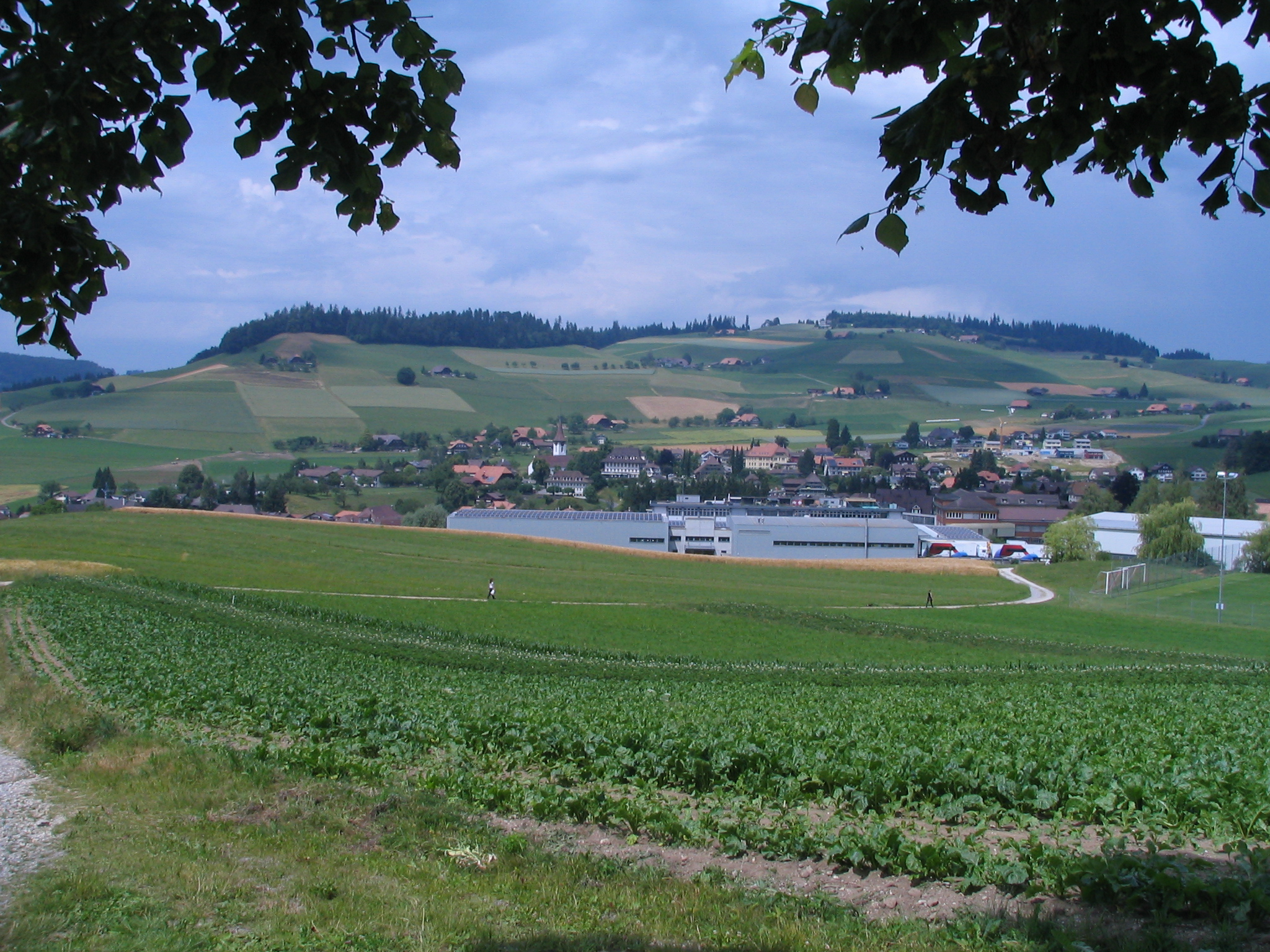
Biglen seen from South

Biglen (Highest Alemannic: Bigle) is a municipality in the Bern-Mittelland administrative district in the canton of Bern in Switzerland.

== History ==
Biglen is first mentioned in 894 as Pigiluna. In 1236 it was mentioned as Biglun.

The earliest traces of a settlement in the area are scattered Roman era artifacts which have been found throughout the municipality. Very little is known about the village in the Middle Ages. An early clan were the numerous Biglers, who also went by von Biglen after 1300. In the 14th century Heinrich von Biglen, a citizen of Bern, acquired much of the village. He donated the village to the Niederspital of Bern in 1359. The village was part of several districts before being assigned to the Amtsbezirk Konolfingen in 1803.

The first village church was probably built in the 11th century and was mentioned in 1236 as the Church of St. Peter. The current church building is from 1521. It was the parish church for a parish that included several near by farms and villages.

Traditionally the village economy relied on subsistence agriculture. However, in the 18th century local farmers began to raise grass which they could harvest as hay for cattle. By the 19th century, dairy farming had replaced traditional agriculture. The first dairy and cheese maker opened in the area in 1828. A village school opened in 1878. In 1899 the Burgdorf-Thun Railway connected the village to the growing rail network. Easy transportation links allowed industry to flourish in Biglen. By 1990 over half of the jobs in Biglen were in industry and many other workers commuted to Bern or other towns for jobs.

== Geography ==
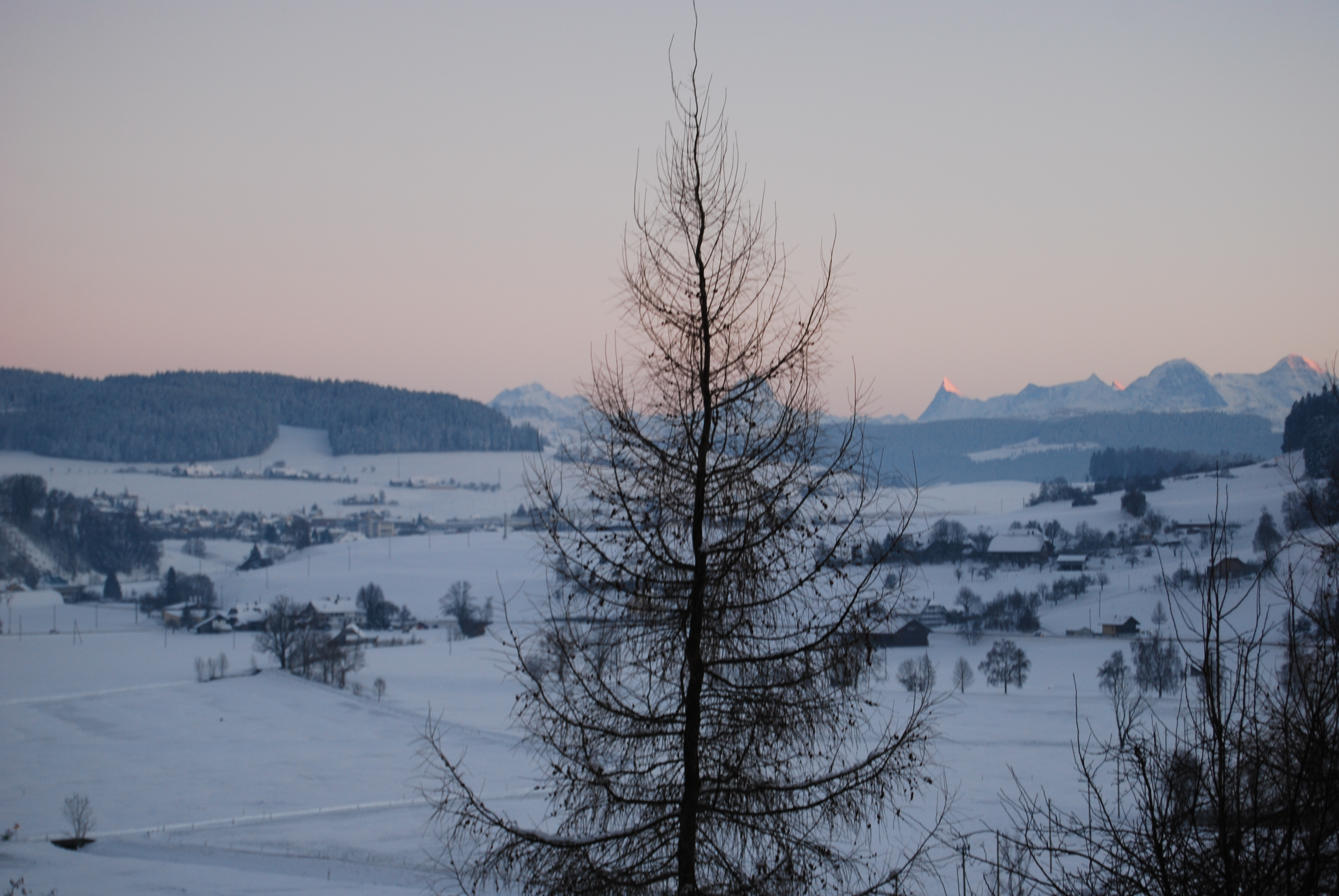
View over the Walkringer Moos, Biglen and the Bernese Alps.

Aerial view (1958)

Biglen has an area of 3.59 km^{2} (1.39 sq mi). Of this area, 2.6 km^{2} (1.0 mi^{2}) or 72.4% is used for agricultural purposes, while 0.22 km^{2} (0.085 mi^{2}) or 6.1% is forested. Of the rest of the land, 0.76 km^{2} (0.29 mi^{2}) or 21.2% is settled (buildings or roads).

Of the built up area, industrial buildings made up 1.9% of the total area while housing and buildings made up 12.3% and transportation infrastructure made up 6.1%. Out of the forested land, all of the forested land area is covered with heavy forests. Of the agricultural land, 47.6% is used for growing crops and 23.1% is pastures, while 1.7% is used for orchards or vine crops.

The municipality includes the village of Biglen, the hamlet Enetbach and individual farm houses.

On 31 December 2009 Amtsbezirk Konolfingen, the municipality's former district, was dissolved. On the following day, 1 January 2010, it joined the newly created Verwaltungskreis Bern-Mittelland.

== Coat of arms ==
The blazon of the municipal coat of arms is Per fess Gules and Azure a double Cross in bend couped counterchanged.

== Demographics ==
Biglen has a population (as of December 2020) of 1,847. As of 2010, 6.7% of the population are resident foreign nationals. Over the last 10 years (2000-2010) the population has changed at a rate of -5.5%. Migration accounted for -2.2%, while births and deaths accounted for 0.1%.

Most of the population (as of 2000) speaks German (1,698 or 94.9%) as their first language, Italian is the second most common (26 or 1.5%) and Albanian is the third (23 or 1.3%). There are 9 people who speak French and 5 people who speak Romansh.

As of 2008, the population was 49.4% male and 50.6% female. The population was made up of 791 Swiss men (45.9% of the population) and 61 (3.5%) non-Swiss men. There were 817 Swiss women (47.4%) and 55 (3.2%) non-Swiss women. Of the population in the municipality, 525 or about 29.3% were born in Biglen and lived there in 2000. There were 887 or 49.6% who were born in the same canton, while 188 or 10.5% were born somewhere else in Switzerland, and 138 or 7.7% were born outside of Switzerland.

As of 2010, children and teenagers (0–19 years old) make up 21.8% of the population, while adults (20–64 years old) make up 60.4% and seniors (over 64 years old) make up 17.7%.

As of 2000, there were 757 people who were single and never married in the municipality. There were 893 married individuals, 93 widows or widowers and 47 individuals who are divorced.

As of 2000, there were 203 households that consist of only one person and 58 households with five or more people. In 2000, a total of 712 apartments (93.3% of the total) were permanently occupied, while 33 apartments (4.3%) were seasonally occupied and 18 apartments (2.4%) were empty. As of 2010, the construction rate of new housing units was 0.6 new units per 1000 residents. The vacancy rate for the municipality, in 2011, was 2.65%.

The historical population is given in the following chart:

== Politics ==
In the 2011 federal election the most popular party was the Swiss People's Party (SVP) which received 32.6% of the vote. The next three most popular parties were the Conservative Democratic Party (BDP) (24%), the Social Democratic Party (SP) (12.2%) and the FDP.The Liberals (7.5%). In the federal election, a total of 670 votes were cast, and the voter turnout was 50.0%.

== Economy ==
As of 2011, Biglen had an unemployment rate of 1.35%. As of 2008, there were a total of 658 people employed in the municipality. Of these, there were 54 people employed in the primary economic sector and about 22 businesses involved in this sector. 316 people were employed in the secondary sector and there were 22 businesses in this sector. 288 people were employed in the tertiary sector, with 48 businesses in this sector. There were 973 residents of the municipality who were employed in some capacity, of which females made up 43.5% of the workforce.

In 2008 there were a total of 521 full-time equivalent jobs. The number of jobs in the primary sector was 30, all of which were in agriculture. The number of jobs in the secondary sector was 278 of which 206 or (74.1%) were in manufacturing and 72 (25.9%) were in construction. The number of jobs in the tertiary sector was 213. In the tertiary sector; 66 or 31.0% were in wholesale or retail sales or the repair of motor vehicles, 12 or 5.6% were in the movement and storage of goods, 8 or 3.8% were the insurance or financial industry, 29 or 13.6% were technical professionals or scientists, 28 or 13.1% were in education and 46 or 21.6% were in health care.

In 2000, there were 394 workers who commuted into the municipality and 677 workers who commuted away. The municipality is a net exporter of workers, with about 1.7 workers leaving the municipality for every one entering. Of the working population, 18.4% used public transportation to get to work, and 53.1% used a private car.

== Religion ==
From the 2000 census, 159 or 8.9% were Roman Catholic, while 1,401 or 78.3% belonged to the Swiss Reformed Church. Of the rest of the population, there were 3 members of an Orthodox church (or about 0.17% of the population), and there were 135 individuals (or about 7.54% of the population) who belonged to another Christian church. There were 38 (or about 2.12% of the population) who were Islamic. There were 2 individuals who were Buddhist, 8 individuals who were Hindu and 1 individual who belonged to another church. 48 (or about 2.68% of the population) belonged to no church, are agnostic or atheist, and 60 individuals (or about 3.35% of the population) did not answer the question.

== Education ==
In Biglen about 761 or (42.5%) of the population have completed non-mandatory upper secondary education, and 191 or (10.7%) have completed additional higher education (either university or a Fachhochschule). Of the 191 who completed tertiary schooling, 74.3% were Swiss men, 20.9% were Swiss women, 4.2% were non-Swiss men.

The Canton of Bern school system provides one year of non-obligatory Kindergarten, followed by six years of Primary school. This is followed by three years of obligatory lower Secondary school where the students are separated according to ability and aptitude. Following the lower Secondary students may attend additional schooling or they may enter an apprenticeship.

During the 2010–11 school year, there were a total of 262 students attending classes in Biglen. There were 2 kindergarten classes with a total of 24 students in the municipality. Of the kindergarten students, 4.2% have a different mother language than the classroom language. The municipality had 6 primary classes and 110 students. Of the primary students, 11.8% were permanent or temporary residents of Switzerland (not citizens) and 8.2% have a different mother language than the classroom language. During the same year, there were 7 lower secondary classes with a total of 128 students. There were 5.5% who were permanent or temporary residents of Switzerland (not citizens) and 5.5% have a different mother language than the classroom language.

As of 2000, there were 63 students in Biglen who came from another municipality, while 45 residents attended schools outside the municipality.

Biglen is home to the Schul- und Gemeindebibliothek Biglen (municipal library of Biglen). The library has (as of 2008) 5,259 books or other media, and loaned out 10,699 items in the same year. It was open a total of 162 days with average of 4.5 hours per week during that year.

== Transportation ==
The municipality has a railway station, Biglen, on the Burgdorf–Thun line. It has regular service to Thun, Konolfingen, and Solothurn.
