= Hasle bei Burgdorf =

Hasle
- Municipality
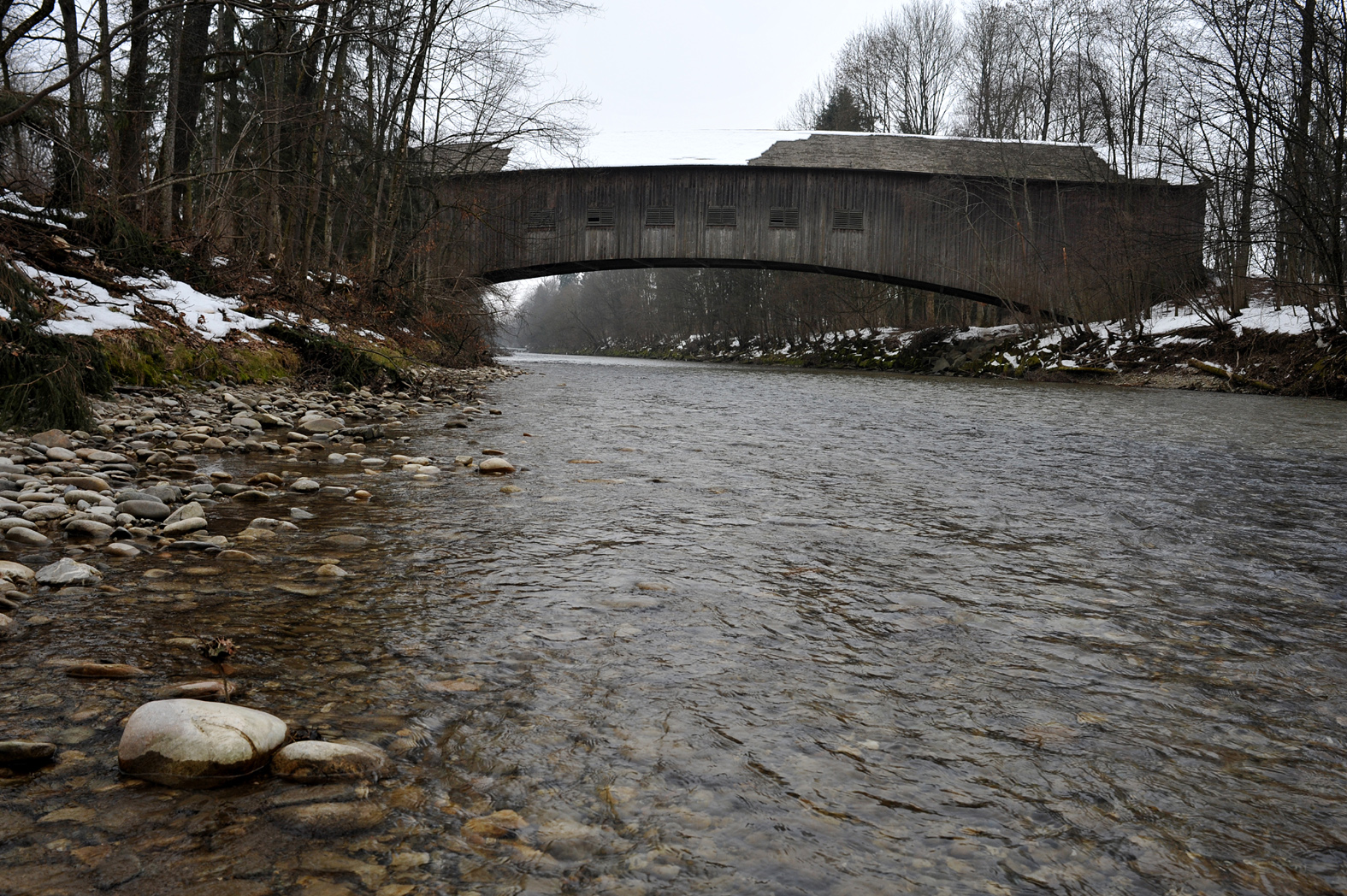
- Wooden bridge of Hasle-Rüegsau near Hasle

- Flag Coat of arms
- Location of Hasle
- Location within Switzerland Location within Canton of Bern
- Coordinates: 47°0′N 7°39′E
- Country: Switzerland
- Canton: Bern
- District: Emmental

Government
  - Mayor: Matthias Stucki

Area
  - Total: 21.89 km^{2} (8.45 sq mi)
- Elevation: 571 m (1,873 ft)
- Highest elevation: 918 m (3,012 ft)
- Lowest elevation: 555 m (1,821 ft)

Population (December 2020)
  - Total: 3,302
  - Density: 150.8/km^{2} (390.7/sq mi)
- Time zone: UTC+01:00 (CET)
  - Summer (DST): UTC+02:00 (CEST)
- Postal code: 3415
- SFOS number: 406
- ISO 3166 code: CH-BE
- Surrounded by: Burgdorf, Heimiswil, Lützelflüh, Oberburg, Rüderswil, Rüegsau, Vechigen, Walkringen
- Website: www.hasle.ch

Hasle bei Burgdorf is a municipality in the administrative district of Emmental in the canton of Bern in Switzerland.

== History ==
The settlements Uetigen (Utingun), Gomerkinden (Comirichingun), Bigel (Pigiluna) and further hamlets were first mentioned as soon as 894 in a bestowment to the Abbey of St. Gall. Hasel, however, was only mentioned in 1225 as Hasela. The village has since been called Hasle (1261), Hassly (1531), and Hassle (1574). The name can be traced back to the Old High German word hasal, meaning hazel bush.

In the Middle Ages, Hasle was part of the Grafschaft Kyburg. From 1384, it was ruled by Bern. In 1525, the village became part of the office of a village mayor Burgdorf. After the collapse of the Ancien Régime in 1798, during the Helvetic Republic, Hasle became a part of the district (Distrikt) of Burgdorf; from 1803, it was part of the Oberamt of Burgdorf, which became a district (Amtsbezirk) in 1831.

== Geography ==
Aerial view from 300 m by Walter Mittelholzer (1923)

Hasle bei Burgdorf has an area of 21.89 km^{2} (8.45 sq mi). Of this area, 12.87 km^{2} (4.97 mi^{2}) or 58.8% is used for agricultural purposes, while 7.12 km^{2} (2.75 mi^{2}) or 32.5% is forested. Of the rest of the land, 1.68 km^{2} (0.65 mi^{2}) or 7.7% is settled (buildings or roads), 0.19 km^{2} (0.073 mi^{2}) or 0.9% is either rivers or lakes and 0.01 km^{2} (2.5 acres) or 0.0% is unproductive land.

Of the built up area, housing and buildings made up 3.3% and transportation infrastructure made up 3.2%. Out of the forested land, 30.7% of the total land area is heavily forested and 1.8% is covered with orchards or small clusters of trees. Of the agricultural land, 22.5% is used for growing crops and 34.1% is pastures, while 2.2% is used for orchards or vine crops. All the water in the municipality is flowing water.

The municipality is located along the Emme river and in the Bigen and Biembach valleys at elevations of 570–900 meters (1,870–2,950 ft). It consists of the villages of Hasle, Goldbach, Schafhausen and Biembach along with hamlets and farm houses.

Hasle bei Burgdorf is located 5 kilometers (3.1 mi) as the crow flies southeast of the district capital Burgdorf. It is in the Emmental in the floodplain on the left shore of the Emme in the molasse hills of the higher Swiss Plateau.

The northeastern border of the municipality runs along the Emme. The main settlement area is the floodplain and the rock terrace, which is about 20 meters (66 ft) higher than the river bed. In the area by Hasle bei Burgdorf, the Emmental is about 1 to 2 kilometres (0.6 to 1 mi) wide. From the Southwest and the South four other valleys meet the Emmental: Biembachtal, Bigental, Talgraben and Goldbachtal. Almost the whole watershed of the Biembachtal belongs to Hasle bei Burgdorf, while only the lower segments the other valleys are located in the municipality.

The entire southern and western part of the municipality is covered by´the molasse hills between Emmental and Aaretal. This landscape is characterized by hill crests as well as valleys and trenches, which are often very steep - this makes agricultural use of the land very difficult. Therefore, the hills are dominated by pasture and forests from a certain height. The hills reach an average height of 800 meters (2,600 ft) above sea level. On the Wägesse a broad crest between Biembachtal and the Widimattgraben - another valley - the highest point in Hasle bei Burgdorf is reached with 918 meters (3,012 ft) above sea level.

On 31 December 2009 Amtsbezirk Burgdorf, the municipality's former district, was dissolved. On the following day, 1 January 2010, it joined the newly created Verwaltungskreis Emmental.

== Coat of arms ==
The blazon of the municipal coat of arms is Per pale Sable and Argent overall a Cross of four Hazle Leaves counterchanged. The hazel leaf (German: Hasel) makes this an example of canting arms.

== Demographics ==
Hasle bei Burgdorf has a population (as of December 2020) of 3,302. As of 2010, 5.4% of the population are resident foreign nationals. Over the last 10 years (2000-2010) the population has changed at a rate of 4.4%. Migration accounted for 2.9%, while births and deaths accounted for 1.7%.

Most of the population (as of 2000) speaks German (2,827 or 95.9%) as their first language, Serbo-Croatian is the second most common (24 or 0.8%) and Albanian is the third (13 or 0.4%). There are 7 people who speak French, 9 people who speak Italian.

As of 2008, the population was 49.8% male and 50.2% female. The population was made up of 1,455 Swiss men (46.9% of the population) and 90 (2.9%) non-Swiss men. There were 1,483 Swiss women (47.8%) and 77 (2.5%) non-Swiss women. Of the population in the municipality, 1,020 or about 34.6% were born in Hasle bei Burgdorf and lived there in 2000. There were 1,383 or 46.9% who were born in the same canton, while 240 or 8.1% were born somewhere else in Switzerland, and 195 or 6.6% were born outside of Switzerland.

As of 2010, children and teenagers (0–19 years old) make up 21.9% of the population, while adults (20–64 years old) make up 60.4% and seniors (over 64 years old) make up 17.7%.

As of 2000, there were 1,237 people who were single and never married in the municipality. There were 1,407 married individuals, 192 widows or widowers and 112 individuals who are divorced.

As of 2000, there were 347 households that consist of only one person and 119 households with five or more people. In 2000, a total of 1,142 apartments (88.2% of the total) were permanently occupied, while 90 apartments (6.9%) were seasonally occupied and 63 apartments (4.9%) were empty. As of 2010, the construction rate of new housing units was 8.4 new units per 1000 residents. The vacancy rate for the municipality, in 2011, was 0.39%.

The historical population is given in the following chart:

== Attractions ==
The Protestant church in Hasle dates back to Medieval construction, but was reconstructed from 1678 to 1680 in Baroque style. Frescoes from the Late Gothic were, however, conserved.

=== Heritage sites of national significance ===
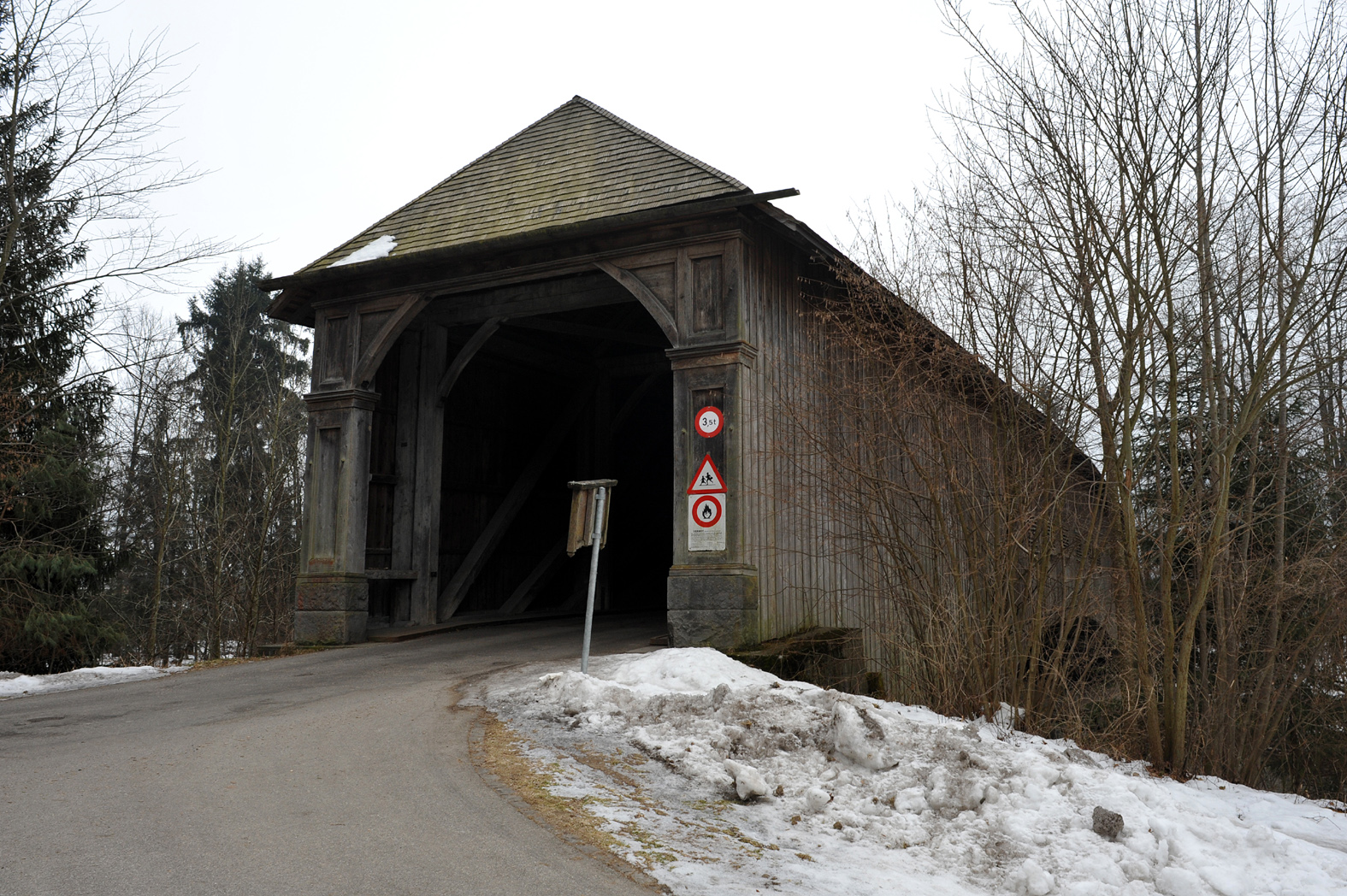
Wooden Bridge

The wooden bridge of Hasle-Rüegsau is listed as a Swiss heritage site of national significance. The village of Goldbach and the hamlet of Bigel are both part of the Inventory of Swiss Heritage Sites.

== Politics ==
In the 2011 federal election the most popular party was the Swiss People's Party (SVP) which received 34.9% of the vote. The next three most popular parties were the Conservative Democratic Party of Switzerland (BDP) (20.3%), the Social Democratic Party of Switzerland (SP) (13.1%) and the Evangelical People's Party of Switzerland (EVP) (7.4%). In the federal election, a total of 1,099 votes were cast, and the voter turnout was 44.6%.

== Economy ==
Until the second half of the 19th century Hasle bei Burgdorf was primarily an agricultural village. However, trade and industry developed very early in the municipality. In the course of the 19th century a hat factory, a weaving mill, and a brewery were founded here.

Nonetheless, Hasle bei Burgdorf still primarily lives from agriculture, especially dairy and animal husbandry; but there is also tillage and fruit-growing.

As of 2011, Hasle bei Burgdorf had an unemployment rate of 1.81%. As of 2008, there were a total of 1,115 people employed in the municipality. Of these, there were 291 people employed in the primary economic sector and about 97 businesses involved in this sector. 352 people were employed in the secondary sector and there were 37 businesses in this sector. 472 people were employed in the tertiary sector, with 68 businesses in this sector.

In 2008 there were a total of 858 full-time equivalent jobs. The number of jobs in the primary sector was 190, all of which were in agriculture. The number of jobs in the secondary sector was 324 of which 159 or (49.1%) were in manufacturing, 88 or (27.2%) were in mining and 75 (23.1%) were in construction. The number of jobs in the tertiary sector was 344. In the tertiary sector; 102 or 29.7% were in wholesale or retail sales or the repair of motor vehicles, 84 or 24.4% were in the movement and storage of goods, 35 or 10.2% were in a hotel or restaurant, 6 or 1.7% were in the information industry, 5 or 1.5% were the insurance or financial industry, 18 or 5.2% were technical professionals or scientists, 23 or 6.7% were in education and 33 or 9.6% were in health care.

In 2000, there were 516 workers who commuted into the municipality and 1,054 workers who commuted away. The municipality is a net exporter of workers, with about 2.0 workers leaving the municipality for every one entering. Of the working population, 15% used public transportation to get to work, and 53.1% used a private car.

== Religion ==
From the 2000 census, 118 or 4.0% were Roman Catholic, while 2,411 or 81.8% belonged to the Swiss Reformed Church. Of the rest of the population, there were 28 members of an Orthodox church (or about 0.95% of the population), and there were 201 individuals (or about 6.82% of the population) who belonged to another Christian church. There were 3 individuals (or about 0.10% of the population) who were Jewish, and 59 (or about 2.00% of the population) who were Islamic. There was 1 person who was Buddhist and 47 individuals who were Hindu. 96 (or about 3.26% of the population) belonged to no church, are agnostic or atheist, and 84 individuals (or about 2.85% of the population) did not answer the question.

== Education ==
In Hasle bei Burgdorf about 1,215 or (41.2%) of the population have completed non-mandatory upper secondary education, and 258 or (8.8%) have completed additional higher education (either university or a Fachhochschule). Of the 258 who completed tertiary schooling, 71.3% were Swiss men, 22.9% were Swiss women, 4.3% were non-Swiss men.

The Canton of Bern school system provides one year of non-obligatory Kindergarten, followed by six years of Primary school. This is followed by three years of obligatory lower Secondary school where the students are separated according to ability and aptitude. Following the lower Secondary students may attend additional schooling or they may enter an apprenticeship.

During the 2009-10 school year, there were a total of 270 students attending classes in Hasle bei Burgdorf. There were 3 kindergarten classes with a total of 58 students in the municipality. Of the kindergarten students, 5.2% were permanent or temporary residents of Switzerland (not citizens) and 8.6% have a different mother language than the classroom language. The municipality had 10 primary classes and 180 students. Of the primary students, 3.9% were permanent or temporary residents of Switzerland (not citizens) and 7.8% have a different mother language than the classroom language. During the same year, there were 2 lower secondary classes with a total of 32 students. There were 3.1% who were permanent or temporary residents of Switzerland (not citizens) and 9.4% have a different mother language than the classroom language.

As of 2000, there were 133 students in Hasle bei Burgdorf who came from another municipality, while 123 residents attended schools outside the municipality.

== Transportation ==
The municipality has two railway stations, Hasle-Rüegsau and Schafhausen i.E.. The former is located at the junction of the Burgdorf–Thun and Solothurn–Langnau lines, with regular service to Thun, Konolfingen, Solothurn, Langnau i.E., and Sumiswald-Grünen.
