= Walkringen =

- Municipality
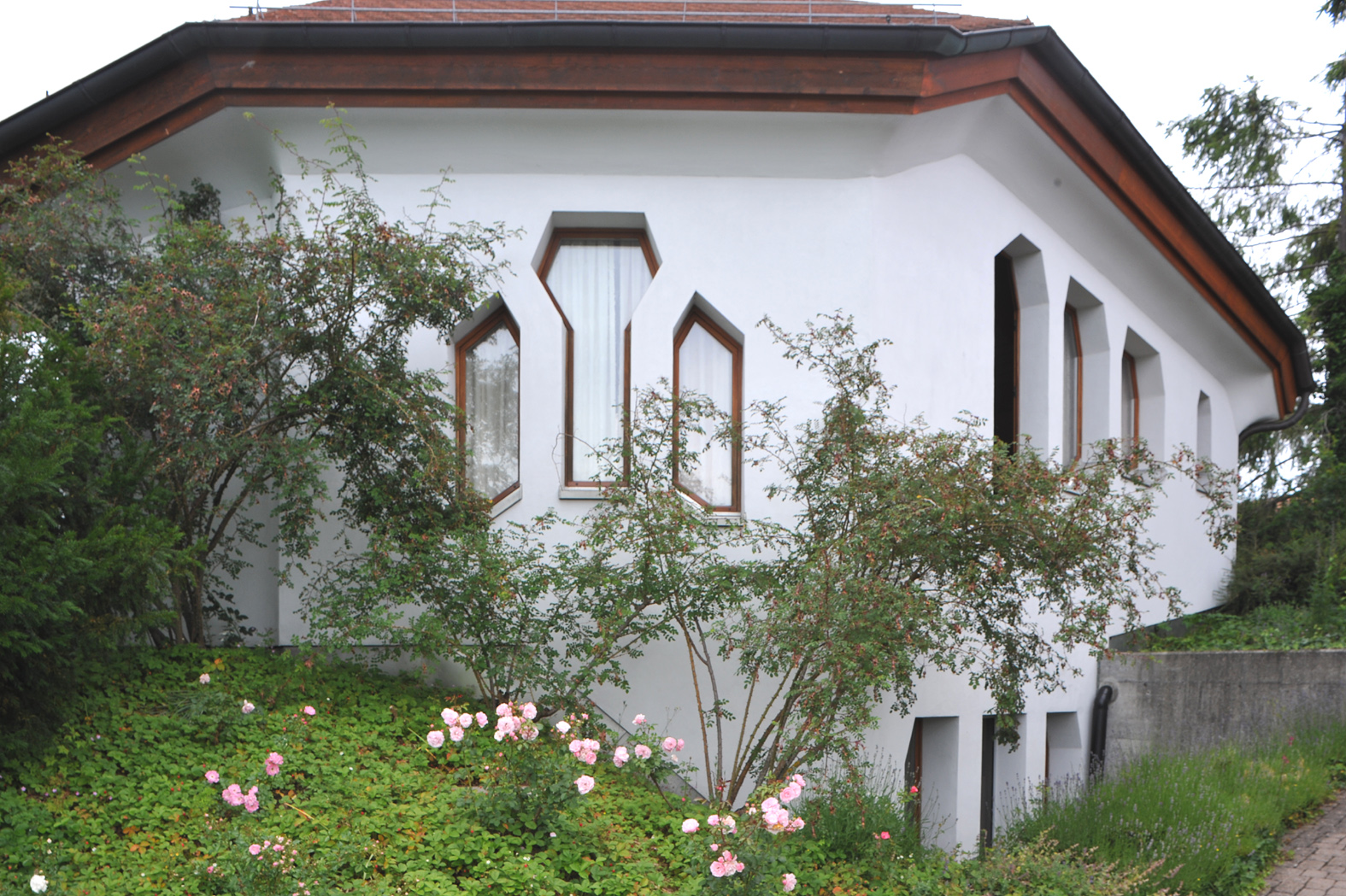
- Eurythmy hall in Rüttihubelbad hamlet in Walkringen municipality

- Flag Coat of arms
- Location of Walkringen
- Location within Switzerland Location within Canton of Bern
- Coordinates: 46°57′N 7°37′E
- Country: Switzerland
- Canton: Bern
- District: Bern-Mittelland

Government
  - Executive: Gemeinderat with 5 members
  - Mayor: Gemeindepräsident(in); Andreas Künzler (as of 2026)

Area
  - Total: 17.2 km^{2} (6.6 sq mi)
- Elevation: 708 m (2,323 ft)

Population (December 2020)
  - Total: 1,755
  - Density: 102/km^{2} (264/sq mi)
- Time zone: UTC+01:00 (CET)
  - Summer (DST): UTC+02:00 (CEST)
- Postal code: 3512
- SFOS number: 626
- ISO 3166 code: CH-BE
- Surrounded by: Arni, Biglen, Hasle bei Burgdorf, Landiswil, Lützelflüh, Vechigen, Worb
- Website: www.walkringen.ch

Walkringen is a municipality in the Bern-Mittelland administrative district in the canton of Bern in Switzerland.

== History ==
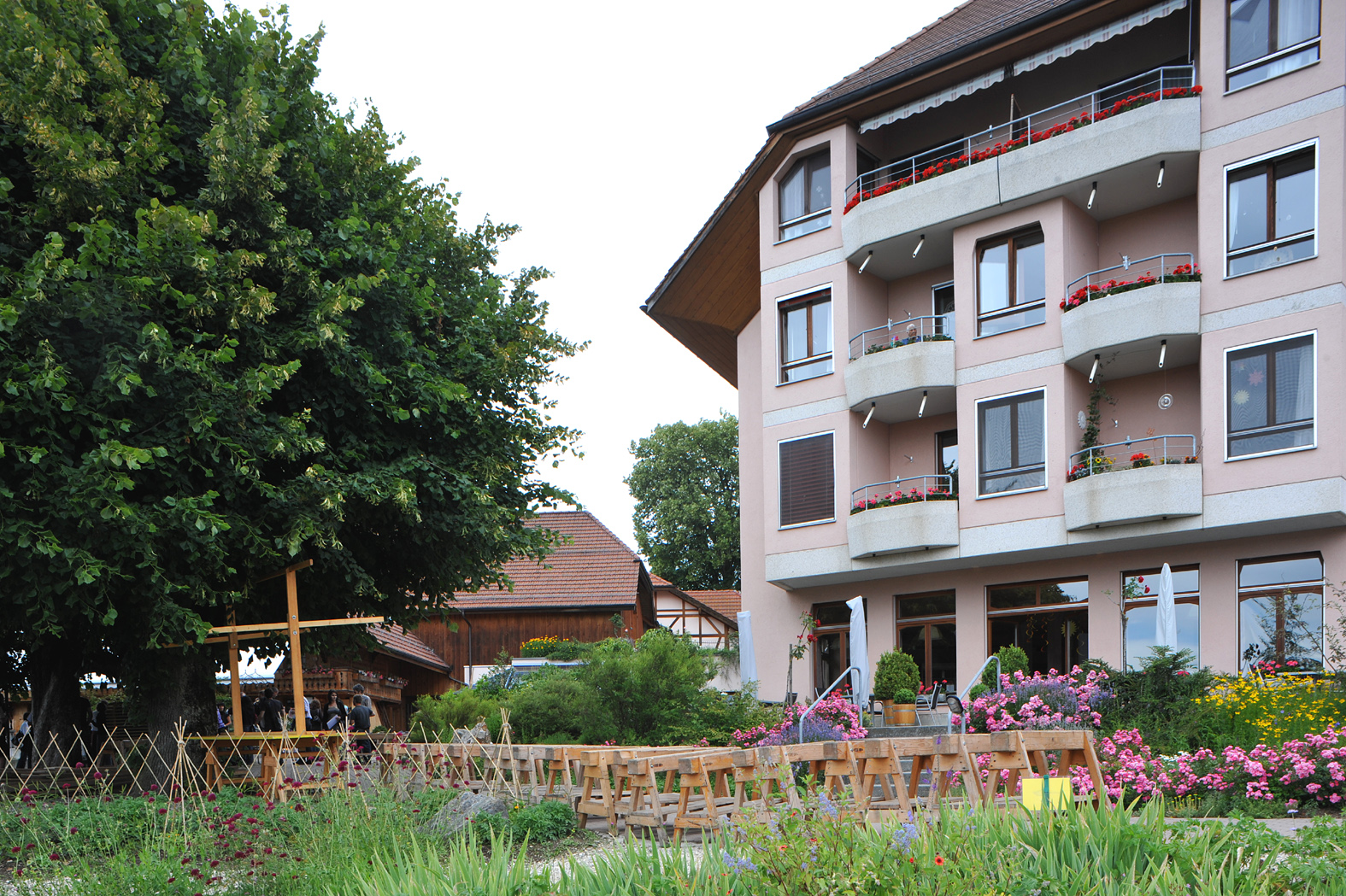
Nursing home at Rüttihubelbad

Walkringen is first mentioned in 1220 as Walcheringin. The oldest trace of a settlement in the area are scattered Bronze Age artifacts were found throughout the Walkringenmoos (Walkringen Bog).

Other ancient artifacts include Roman era bricks and medieval fortification. Earthen fortifications have been found on the Adlisberg, in Wikartswil, in Bigenthal and at Jegerleenscheuer, indicating that one or several local noble families ruled over the area. The three villages that today make up Walkringen have been combined and split up throughout their history.

In the 13th century, the Lords of Kien ruled over Walkringen, Wikartswil and Bigenthal along with the village church. However, in 1398 Verena von Seedorf gave Walkringen village and the church to Thorberg Abbey. The Abbey established a parish in Walkringen village between 1413-18. In 1528, Bern adopted the new faith of the Protestant Reformation and secularized Thorberg Abbey and all the Abbey lands. Walkringen village was placed under the Bernese bailiff of Thorberg. The three villages remained separated until the 19th century, when they merged into a single political municipality.

The first village church in Walkringen was probably built around the 9th century, though the cemetery was first used for burials in the 7th century. A newer church was built on the foundation of the 9th-century building and was first mentioned in 1239. The present church building was built in 1514-15.

Throughout their early history the villages lived by farming. The village was on the road between the Aare and Emme valleys. In 1507, the Bernese administration built a toll station in the village to collect money from this route. During the 18th and 19th centuries, Walkringen's location on the road helped turn it into a center of the canvas weaving industry. As the textile industry began to decline, saw mills and other industries moved in. Several projects drained the bogs and marshes in 1848 and further in 1944, which opened up new farm land. A railroad station on the Burgdorf-Thun line opened in 1899. The municipality has grown into regional center with the Friederika Foundation jobs training center, a conference center for the parish, the Sunnegg group home and employment center as well as a nursing home. There are school buildings in all three villages; Walkringen, Wikartswil and Bigenthal.

== Geography ==
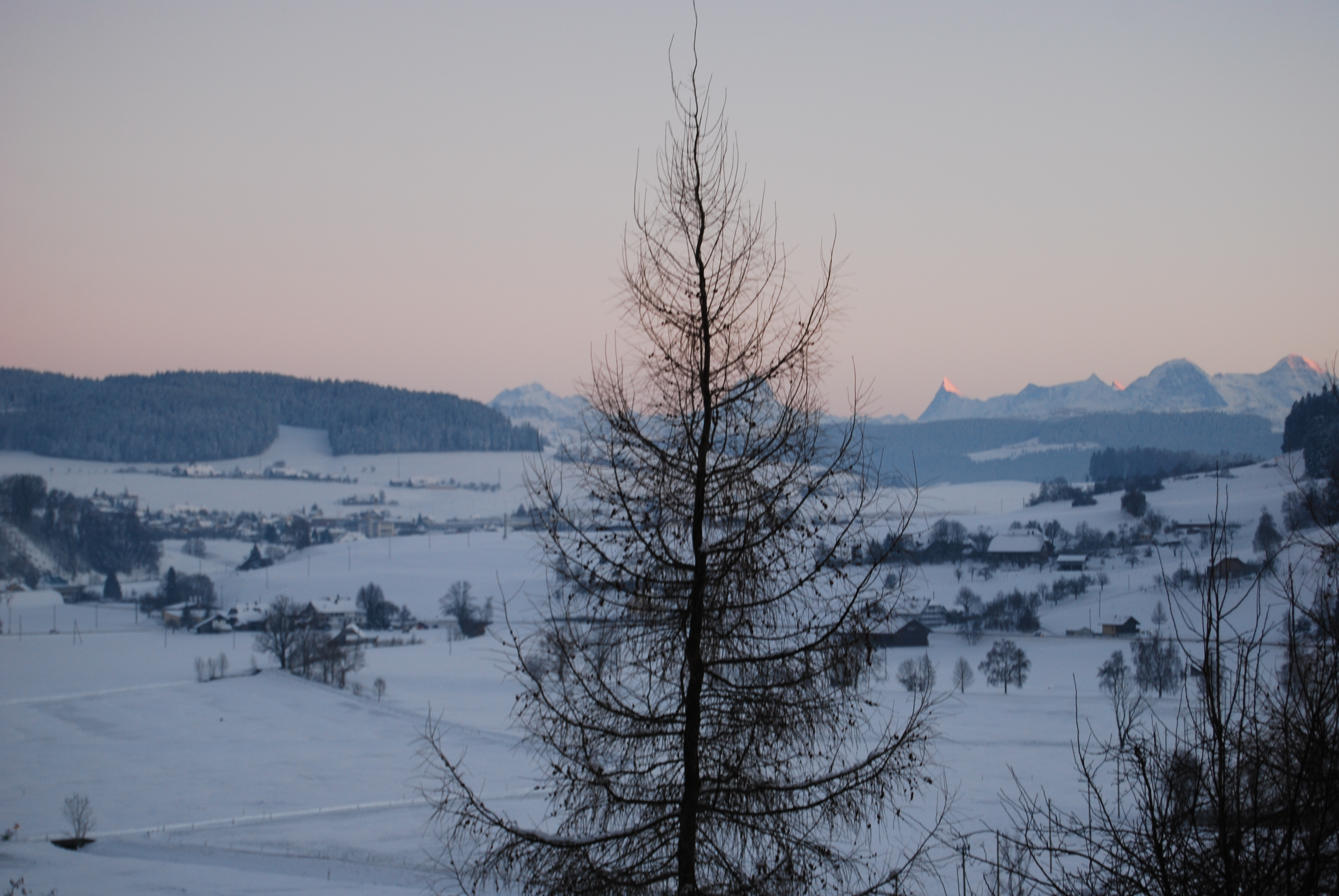
View over the Walkringenmoos and surrounding hills

Walkringen has an area of 17.21 km^{2} (6.64 sq mi). As of 2012, a total of 9.48 km^{2} (3.66 mi^{2}) or 55.1% is used for agricultural purposes, while 6.39 km^{2} (2.47 mi^{2}) or 37.2% is forested. Of the rest of the land, 1.29 km^{2} (0.50 mi^{2}) or 7.5% is settled (buildings or roads), 0.04 km^{2} (9.9 acres) or 0.2% is either rivers or lakes and 0.01 km^{2} (2.5 acres) or 0.1% is unproductive land.

During the same year, housing and buildings made up 3.3% and transportation infrastructure made up 3.4%. Out of the forested land, 36.0% of the total land area is heavily forested and 1.2% is covered with orchards or small clusters of trees. Of the agricultural land, 20.2% is used for growing crops and 32.2% is pastures, while 1.7% is used for orchards or vine crops. All the water in the municipality is flowing water.

The municipality is located in the upper Bigen river valley. It consists of the villages of Walkringen, Bigenthal and Wikartswil and the hamlets of Schwendi and Wydimatt as well as scattered farm houses.

On 31 December 2009 Amtsbezirk Konolfingen, the municipality's former district, was dissolved. On the following day, 1 January 2010, it joined the newly created Verwaltungskreis Bern-Mittelland.

== Coat of arms ==
The blazon of the municipal coat of arms is Barry dancetty of six Gules and Argent.

== Demographics ==
Walkringen has a population (as of December 2020) of 1,755. As of 2010, 4.0% of the population are resident foreign nationals. Over the last 10 years (2001-2011) the population has changed at a rate of -0.5%. Migration accounted for 0.7%, while births and deaths accounted for -0.5%.

Most of the population (as of 2000) speaks German (1,899 or 97.1%) as their first language, undifferentiated African languages is the second most common category (11 or 0.6%) and Serbo-Croatian is the third (10 or 0.5%). There are 6 people who speak French, 6 people who speak Italian and 3 people who speak Romansh.

As of 2008, the population was 49.1% male and 50.9% female. The population was made up of 857 Swiss men (46.9% of the population) and 40 (2.2%) non-Swiss men. There were 897 Swiss women (49.1%) and 33 (1.8%) non-Swiss women. Of the population in the municipality, 744 or about 38.0% were born in Walkringen and lived there in 2000. There were 806 or 41.2% who were born in the same canton, while 233 or 11.9% were born somewhere else in Switzerland, and 92 or 4.7% were born outside of Switzerland.

As of 2011, children and teenagers (0–19 years old) make up 21.3% of the population, while adults (20–64 years old) make up 60% and seniors (over 64 years old) make up 18.7%.

As of 2000, there were 885 people who were single and never married in the municipality. There were 868 married individuals, 131 widows or widowers and 72 individuals who are divorced.

As of 2010, there were 211 households that consist of only one person and 62 households with five or more people. In 2000, a total of 677 apartments (89.2% of the total) were permanently occupied, while 58 apartments (7.6%) were seasonally occupied and 24 apartments (3.2%) were empty. As of 2010, the construction rate of new housing units was 0.5 new units per 1000 residents. The vacancy rate for the municipality, in 2011, was 3.61%.

The historical population is given in the following chart:

== Politics ==
In the 2011 federal election the most popular party was the Swiss People's Party (SVP) which received 45.5% of the vote. The next three most popular parties were the Conservative Democratic Party (BDP) (16.8%), the Social Democratic Party (SP) (13.4%) and the Green Party (8.3%). In the federal election, a total of 719 votes were cast, and the voter turnout was 50.0%.

== Economy ==
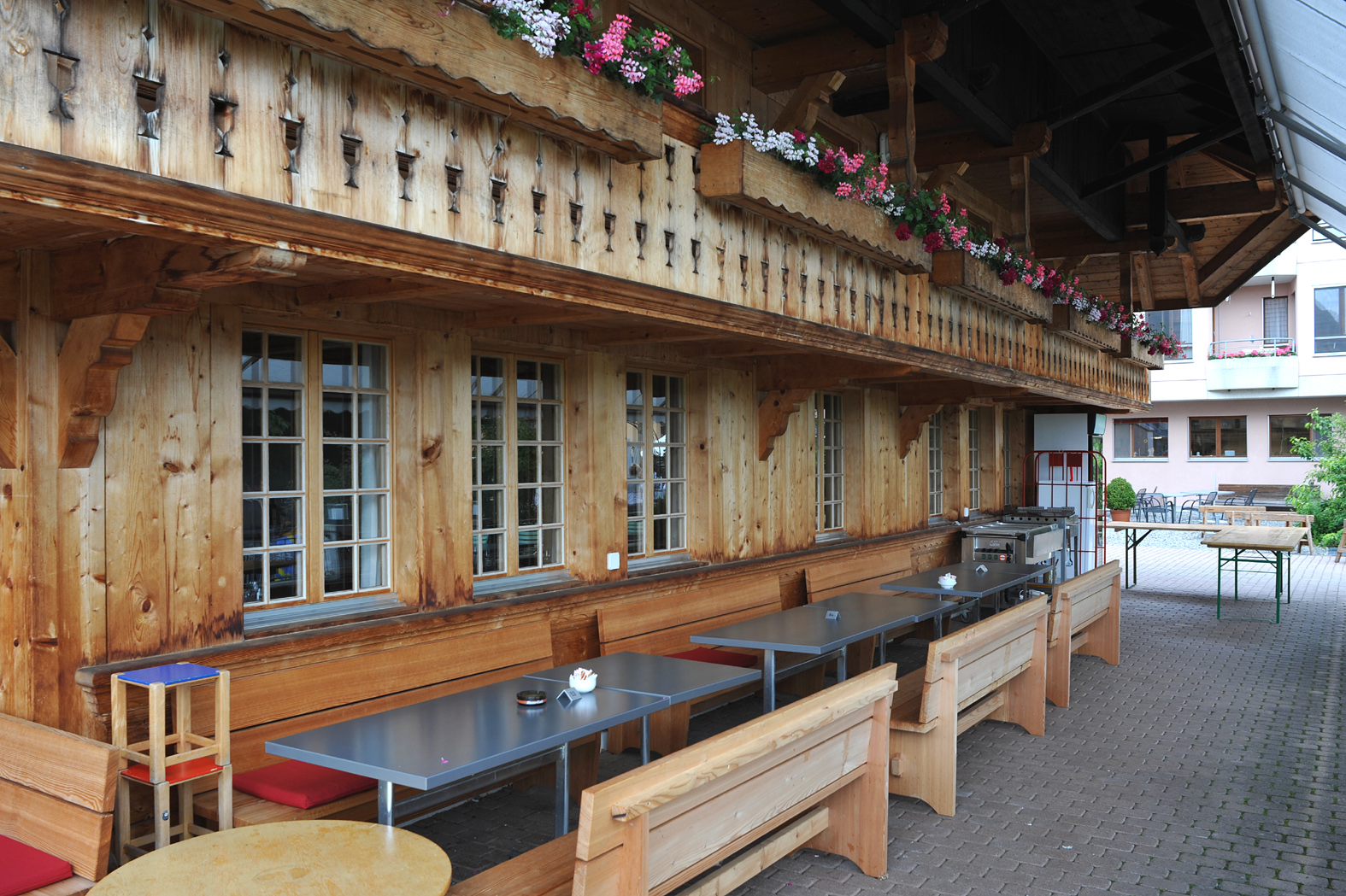
Restaurant in the settlement of Rüttihubelbad

As of 2011, Walkringen had an unemployment rate of 0.95%. As of 2008, there were a total of 985 people employed in the municipality. Of these, there were 204 people employed in the primary economic sector and about 77 businesses involved in this sector. 217 people were employed in the secondary sector and there were 35 businesses in this sector. 564 people were employed in the tertiary sector, with 49 businesses in this sector. There were 1,007 residents of the municipality who were employed in some capacity, of which females made up 41.1% of the workforce.

In 2008 there were a total of 741 full-time equivalent jobs. The number of jobs in the primary sector was 123, all of which were in agriculture. The number of jobs in the secondary sector was 193 of which 139 or (72.0%) were in manufacturing and 38 (19.7%) were in construction. The number of jobs in the tertiary sector was 425. In the tertiary sector; 76 or 17.9% were in wholesale or retail sales or the repair of motor vehicles, 21 or 4.9% were in the movement and storage of goods, 46 or 10.8% were in a hotel or restaurant, 5 or 1.2% were technical professionals or scientists, 15 or 3.5% were in education and 241 or 56.7% were in health care.

In 2000, there were 402 workers who commuted into the municipality and 588 workers who commuted away. The municipality is a net exporter of workers, with about 1.5 workers leaving the municipality for every one entering. A total of 419 workers (51.0% of the 821 total workers in the municipality) both lived and worked in Walkringen.

Of the working population, 12% used public transportation to get to work, and 54.7% used a private car.

In 2011 the average local and cantonal tax rate on a married resident of Walkringen making 150,000 CHF was 13.1%, while an unmarried resident's rate was 19.2%. For comparison, the average rate for the entire canton in 2006 was 13.9% and the nationwide rate was 11.6%. In 2009 there were a total of 785 tax payers in the municipality. Of that total, 183 made over 75 thousand CHF per year. There were 11 people who made between 15 and 20 thousand CHF per year. The greatest number of workers, 231, made between 50 and 75 thousand CHF per year.

== Religion ==
From the 2000 census, 1,576 or 80.6% belonged to the Swiss Reformed Church, while 109 or 5.6% were Roman Catholic. Of the rest of the population, there were 7 members of an Orthodox church (or about 0.36% of the population), and there were 112 individuals (or about 5.73% of the population) who belonged to another Christian church. There were 16 (or about 0.82% of the population) who were Islamic. 114 (or about 5.83% of the population) belonged to no church, are agnostic or atheist, and 66 individuals (or about 3.37% of the population) did not answer the question.

== Education ==
In Walkringen about 53.6% of the population have completed non-mandatory upper secondary education, and 16.9% have completed additional higher education (either university or a Fachhochschule). Of the 191 who completed tertiary schooling, 67.0% were Swiss men, 30.9% were Swiss women.

The Canton of Bern school system provides one year of non-obligatory Kindergarten, followed by six years of Primary school. This is followed by three years of obligatory lower Secondary school where the students are separated according to ability and aptitude. Following the lower Secondary students may attend additional schooling or they may enter an apprenticeship.

During the 2011-12 school year, there were a total of 174 students attending classes in Walkringen. There were 2 kindergarten classes with a total of 25 students in the municipality. The municipality had 6 primary classes and 121 students. Of the primary students, 1.7% were permanent or temporary residents of Switzerland (not citizens) and 1.7% have a different mother language than the classroom language. During the same year, there were 2 lower secondary classes with a total of 28 students. There were 3.6% who were permanent or temporary residents of Switzerland (not citizens) and 7.1% have a different mother language than the classroom language.

As of 2000, there were a total of 140 students attending any school in the municipality. Of those, 139 both lived and attended school in the municipality while one student came from another municipality. During the same year, another 139 residents attended schools outside the municipality.

== Transportation ==
The municipality has two railway stations, Walkringen and Bigenthal, on the Burgdorf–Thun line. They have regular service to Thun, Konolfingen, and Solothurn.
