= Hasle-Rüegsau railway station =

Railway station in Hasle bei Burgdorf, Switzerland

Hasle-Rüegsau
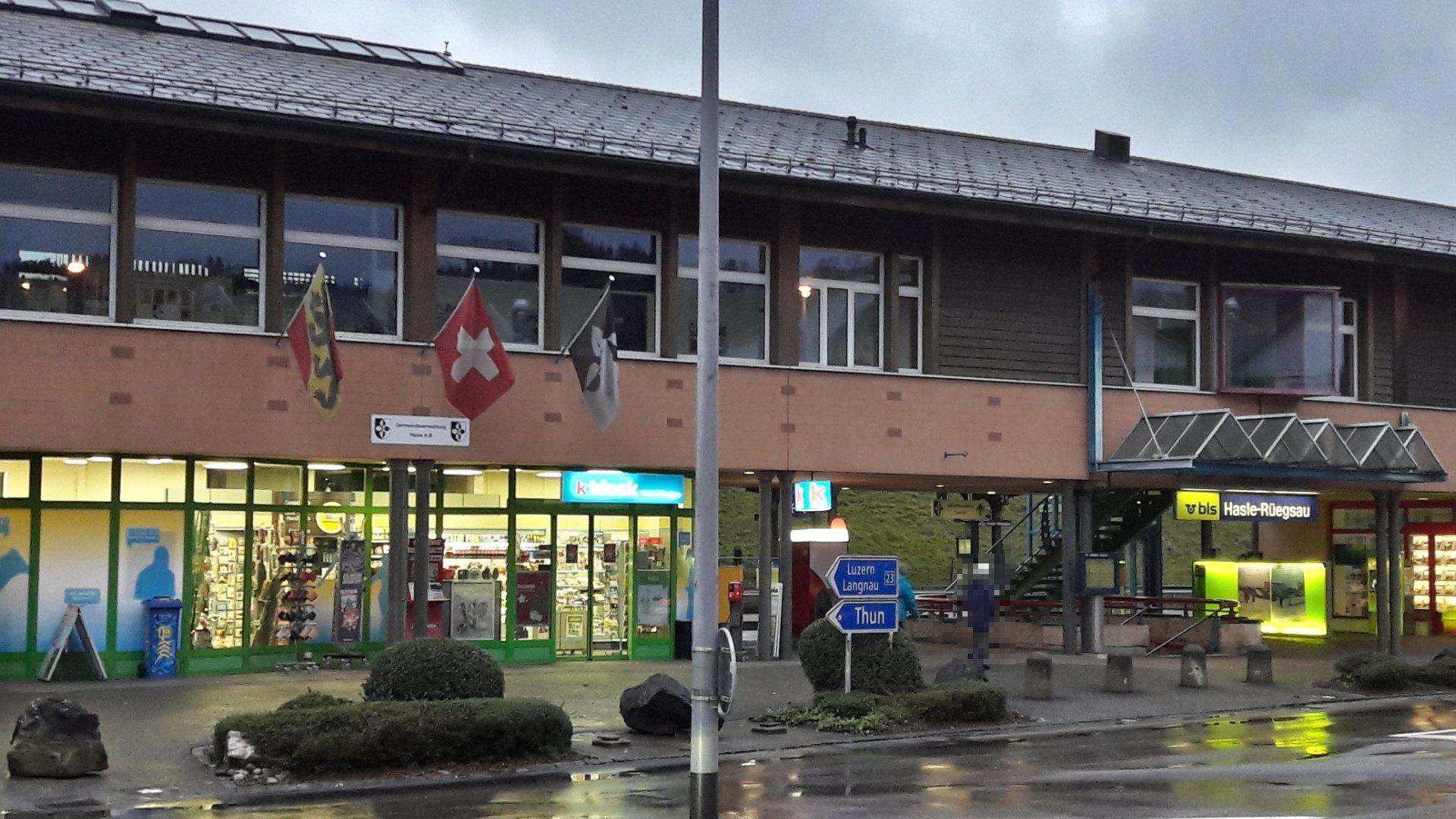
- The station entrance in 2018

General information
- Location: Hasle bei Burgdorf; Switzerland
- Coordinates: 47°01′N 7°40′E
- Elevation: 571 m (1,873 ft)
- Owner: BLS AG
- Lines: Burgdorf–Thun line; Solothurn–Langnau line
- Distance: 27.7 km (17.2 mi) from Solothurn
- Platforms: 4: 1 side platform; 2 side platforms
- Tracks: 5
- Train operators: BLS AG
- Connections: Busland AG buses

Construction
- Parking: Yes (28 spaces)
- Accessible: Partly

Other information
- Station code: 8508265 (HA)
- Fare zone: 154 (Libero)

Passengers
- 2023: 2'700 per weekday (BLS)

Services
Preceding station	Bern S-Bahn	Following station
Oberburg towards Thun	S4	Lützelflüh-Goldbach towards Langnau i.E.
Oberburg towards Solothurn	S41	Schafhausen i.E. towards Thun
Terminus	S42	Walkringen towards Thun
Oberburg towards Burgdorf	S42 Limited service	Walkringen towards Thun
Oberburg towards Thun	S44	Lützelflüh-Goldbach towards Sumiswald-Grünen
Location

Hasle-Rüegsau railway station (German: Bahnhof Hasle-Rüegsau) is a railway station in the municipality of Hasle bei Burgdorf, in the Swiss canton of Bern. It is located at the junction of the standard gauge Burgdorf–Thun and Solothurn–Langnau lines of BLS AG.

== Services ==
As of the December 2024 timetable change, the following services stop at Hasle-Rüegsau:

- Bern S-Bahn:
  - S4 / S44: half-hourly service to Thun and hourly service to Langnau i.E. or Sumiswald-Grünen.
  - S41: hourly service between Thun and Solothurn.
  - S42: hourly service to Thun, limited service to Burgdorf.
