= Burgdorf–Thun railway =

First electrified mainline railway in Europe, in Switzerland

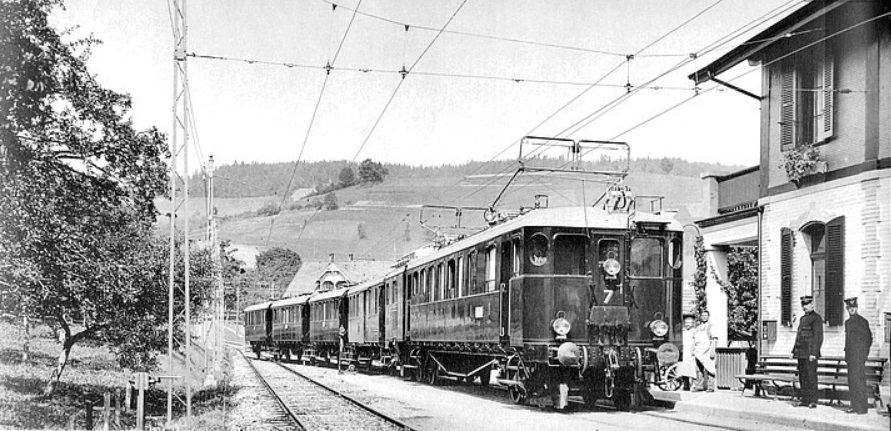
- Burgdorf–Thun railway

Overview
- Line number: 340
- Termini: Burgdorf; Thun

Service
- Operator(s): BLS

Technical
- Line length: 40.8 km (25.4 mi)
- Number of tracks: 1
- Track gauge: 1,435 mm (4 ft 8 1/2 in)
- Minimum radius: 180 metres (590 ft)
- Electrification: 15 kV 16.7 Hz AC overhead catenary; 750 V 40 Hz 3 phase overhead catenary (1899–1933)
- Maximum incline: 2.5%

The Burgdorf–Thun railway is a railway line in Switzerland, which was built by the Burgdorf-Thun-Bahn (Burgdorf-Thun Railway, BTB). The line from Burgdorf via Konolfingen to Thun was opened by the company in 1899 as the first electrified mainline railway (as distinct from light railway) in Europe. It is now part of BLS AG.

== History ==
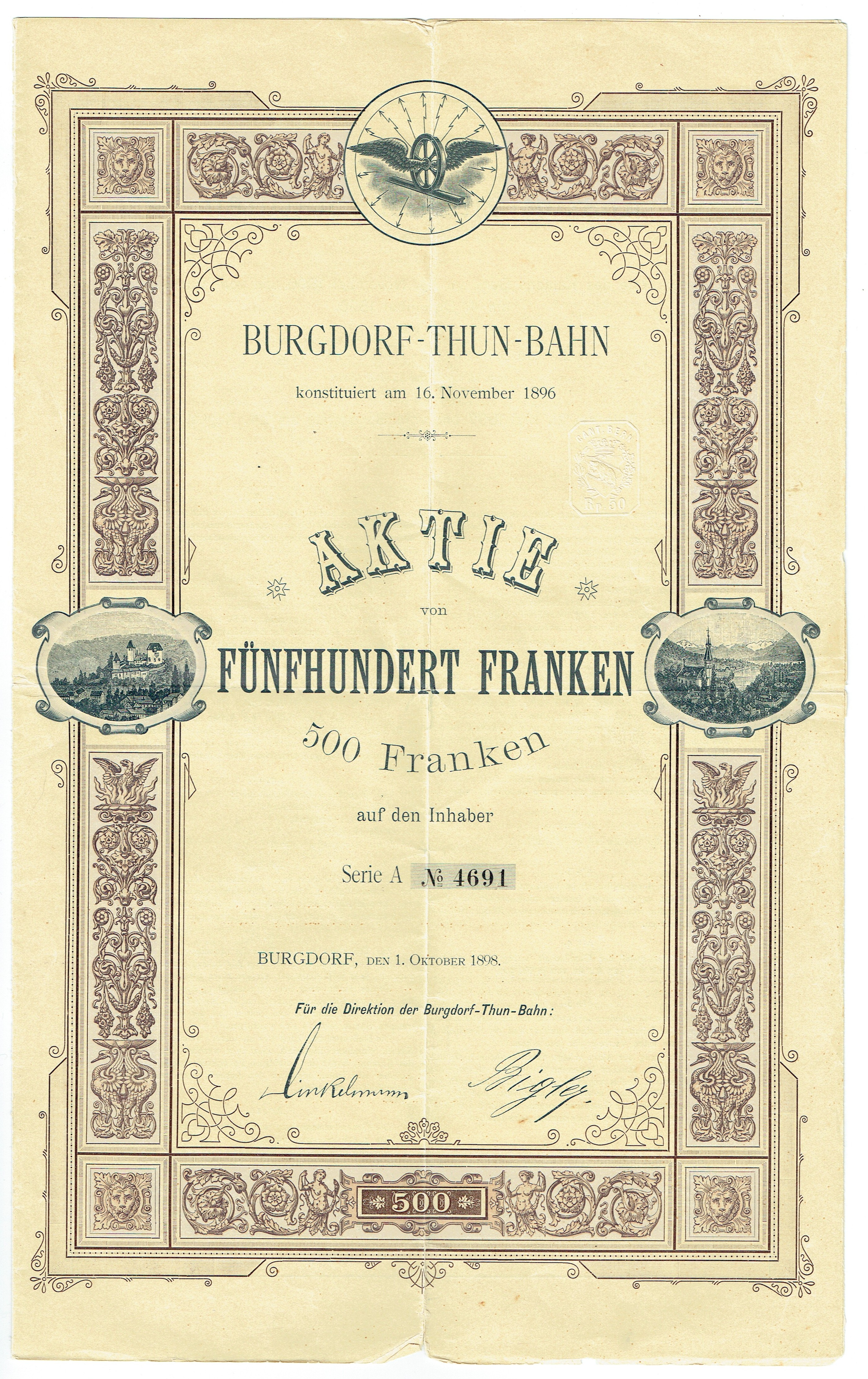
Share certificate of the Burgdorf-Thun-Bahn of 1 October 1898

There was increasing support for a more direct rail connection between Burgdorf and Thun to shorten the route by almost 13 kilometres, which is 53 km via Bern.

The railway was originally licensed in two sections. The first license was granted on 17 April 1891 for the section from Konolfingen to Biglen and the second on 29 June 1893 for the section from Konolfingen to Thun with a branch to Kiesen.

On 23 December 1896, the federal government amalgamated the two licenses as a license "for a railway from Thun via Konolfingen to connect with the Emmental Railway". A connection would be built in Hasle-Rüegsau with the Solothurn–Langnau railway, which was built in 1881 by the Emmentalbahn (Emmental Railway, EB).

=== Start of operations and three-phase current operations ===
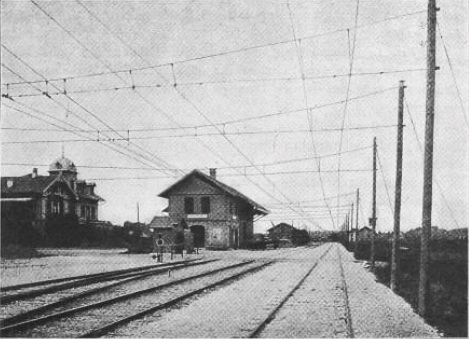
Arrangement of the two-wire overhead line in a station

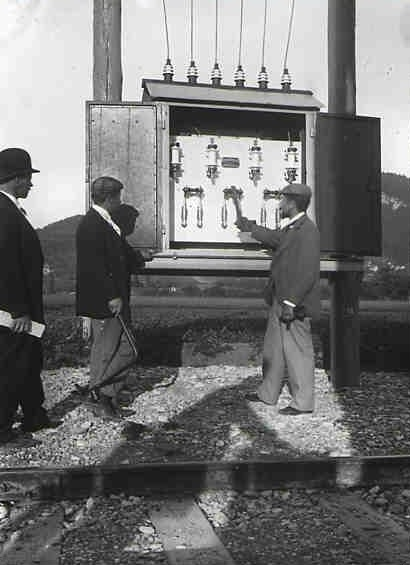
Transformer for overhead contact line

On 21 July 1899, the railway was handed over for operation as the first electric mainline railway in Europe. The line used the track of the Emmen Valley Railway from Burgdorf to Hasle-Rüegsau, including the intermediate stations of Steinhof and Oberburg.

The positive experience with three-phase operations on the Luzern–Stans–Engelberg railway (Stansstad-Engelberg-Bahn) and especially the influence of the electrical engineer Emil Blattner, who was both professor of electrical engineering at the Burgdorf College of Technology (now part of the Bern University of Applied Sciences) and a councillor of Burgdorf, led to a bold decision by the Burgdorf-Thun Railway to electrify the line at 750 volts and 40 hertz three-phase from the start of operations on its relatively long line. Permission to use a high voltage was granted by the Railway Department without regard to the safety of passengers and staff. The electric operations enabled a tight timetable for the time, which was useful in view of the many connections in Burgdorf, Konolfingen and Thun. A contract was signed with Brown, Boveri & Cie. for the supply of electrical equipment and Motor AG was awarded the contract to supply power through the new Kander power station near Spiez.

The power was supplied by the Kander power plant at a primary voltage of 16 000 Volt at the then marketable frequency of 40 Hertz and carried by a three-wire overhead line along the track. This line also served to supply the town of Burgdorf. The power was reduced to 750 volts at 14 substations and fed to the two-wire overhead line. The transformer power of 450 kVA was designed for the load of a so-called double train of 100 tons weight.

Since the beginning of operations, the railway was operated by the Emmental Railway on the basis of an operating contract. Its managing director was also the managing director of the Burgdorf-Thun Railway. The company was based in Burgdorf.

The traffic on the Burgdorf–Thun railway increased continuously, especially freight traffic. In 1911, Company was able to pay a dividend of 2% for the first time. The BTB was not affected by the crisis of the First World War and, on the contrary, revenue from both passenger and freight traffic tripled from 1914 to 1920.

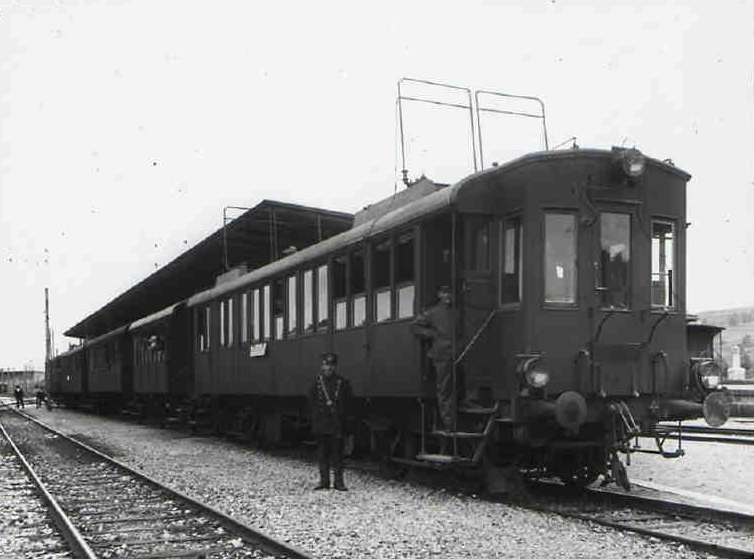
Double set, each with a BCe-4/4 power car in front and behind, in Konolfingen.

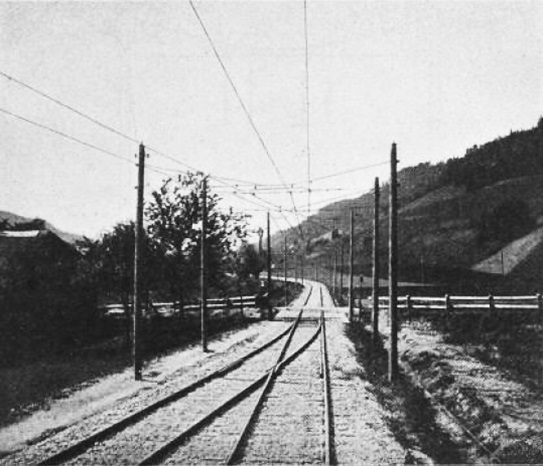
Two-wire three-phase overhead line at points.

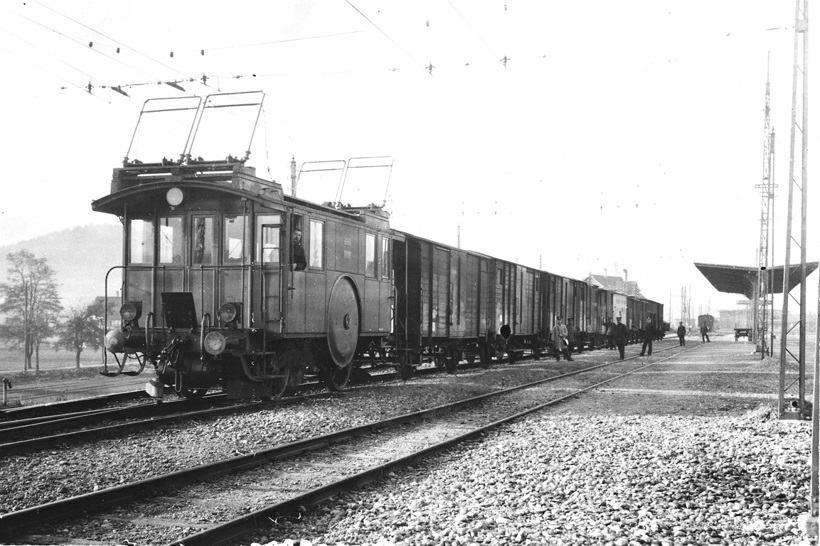
Locomotive No. 2 with a freight train in Konolfingen station.

=== Re-electrification ===
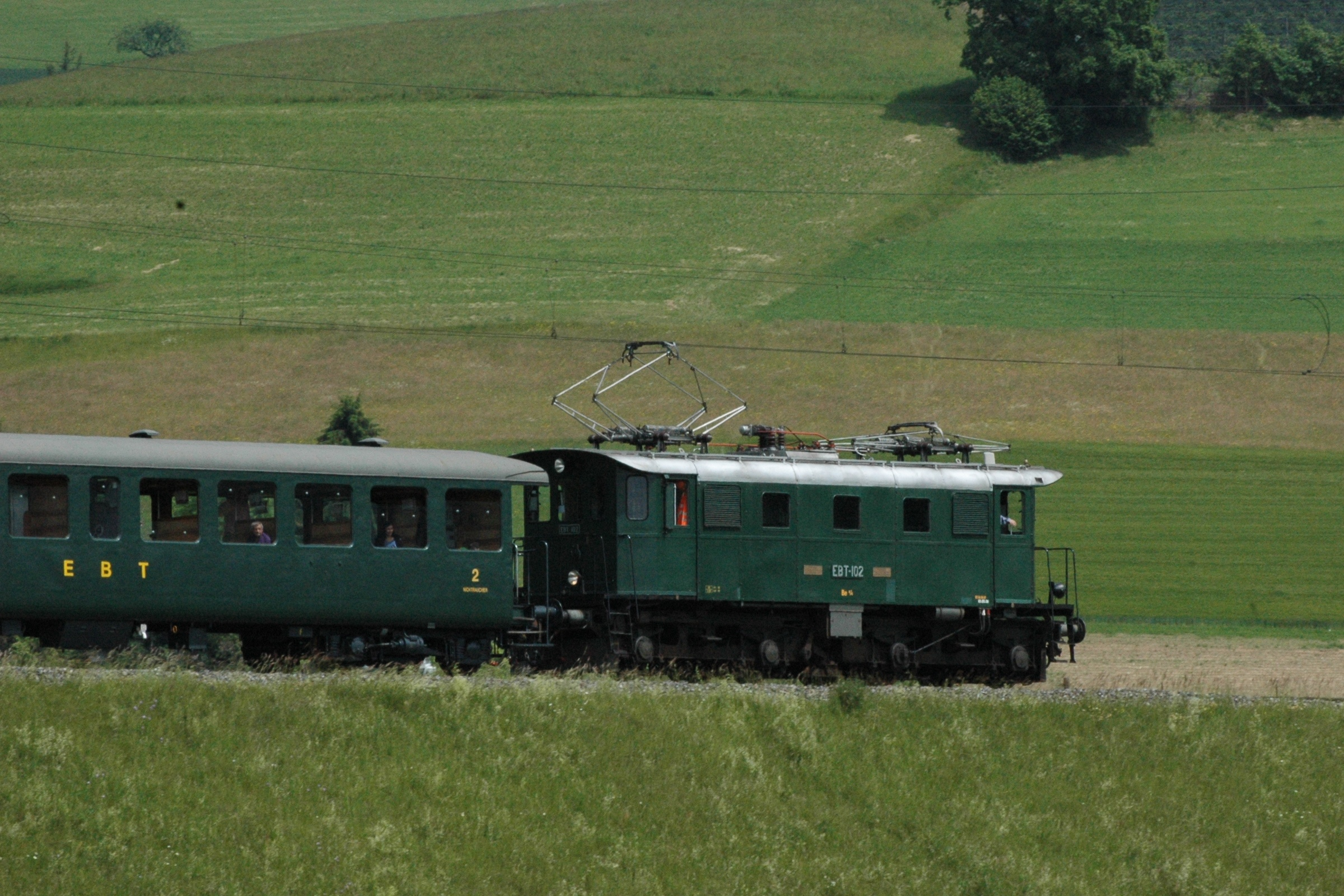
Single-phase AC Be 4/4 locomotive on the line between Grosshöchstetten and Konolfingen.

As early as 1919, the electrification of the Bern–Thun railway caused complications in Thun. In 1920, Bernischen Kraftwerke announced an occasional increase in frequency from 40 to 50 hertz. The three-phase vehicles would have run faster, but the traction of the BCe 4/4 railcar would have been insufficient. The conversion to the SBB electrification system was inevitable due to the electrification of the Bern–Lucerne railway. The sharing of track in Konolfingen by the BTB and SBB would have caused insurmountable problems. In the 1930s, the line was switched in stages from three-phase to single-phase 15 kV 16.7 Hz AC:

- 8 August 1932: Burgdorf – Hasle-Rüegsau
- 12 February 1933: Hasle Rüegsau – Grosshöchstetten
- 30 April 1933: Grosshöchstetten – Thun

For operation with single-phase AC, the BTB, the EB and the Solothurn-Münster-Bahn (Solothurn-Moutier Railway, SMB) jointly procured eight Be 4/4 locomotives and twelve CFe 2/4 railcars. The railcars had half the power of a Be 4/4, since only one bogie was motorised. The essential parts of the electrical equipment were compatible with Be 4/4 sets. The BTB became the owner of locomotives no. 105 and 106 and railcars 126–131. In operation, however, more locomotives and fewer railcars were needed and allocations were adjusted within the operating group.

Until 1987, Bernische Kraftwerke supplied SBB with the same amount of single-phase alternating current from its Mühleberg power station as the BTB, the EB and the SMB purchased from the SBB at the Burgdorf substation. This allowed the construction of a transmission line from Mühleberg to Burgdorf to be avoided.

=== Operations of the EBT and BLS ===
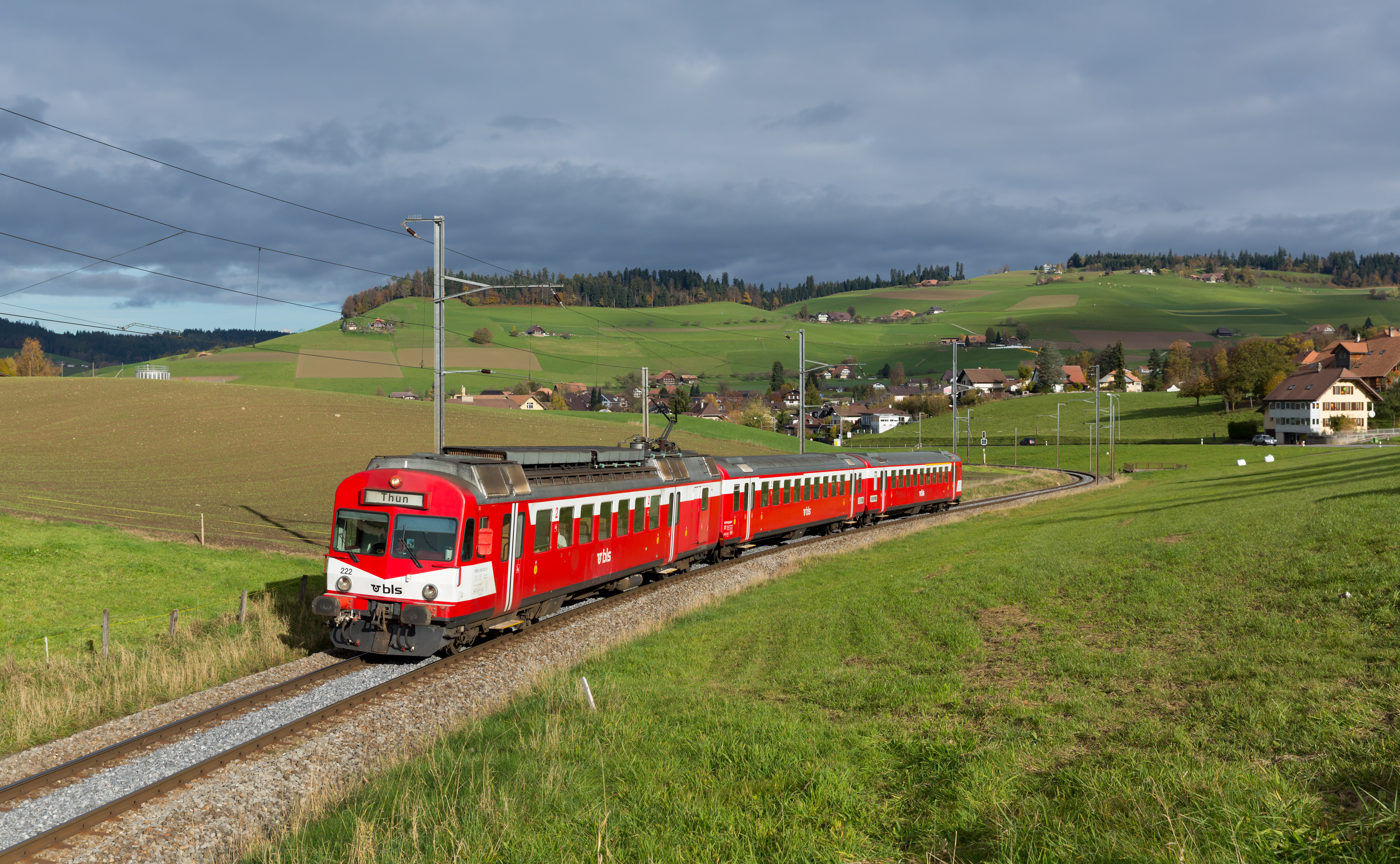
EBT RBDe 4/4 I push-pull train near Biglen.

The Great Depression and competition from cars led to a drastic decline in traffic and revenue. The Privatbahnhilfegesetz (Private Company Services Act) made financial restructuring possible, but required that the Bern-Thun Railway be merged with the Emmental Railway to form the Emmental-Burgdorf-Thun-Bahn (Emmental-Burgdorf-Thun Railway, EBT), which took place on 1 January 1942.

On 4 September 1949, the derailment of a train coming from Thun at the entrance to Heimberg left two dead and six injured.

In 1997, EBT merged with the Vereinigte Huttwil-Bahnen (United Huttwil Railways, VHB) and the Solothurn-Moutier Railway (Solothurn-Münster-Bahn, SMB) to form Regionalverkehr Mittelland (RM). The RM and the BLS Lötschbergbahn were merged to form BLS AG in 2006.

The track is served hourly by two Regio services. An hourly service connects Burgdorf with Thun. The route of the second Regio service is limited to the Konolfingen−Thun section. Additional services run in the peak hours in the morning and in the evening between Konolfingen and Burgdorf.

== Route ==
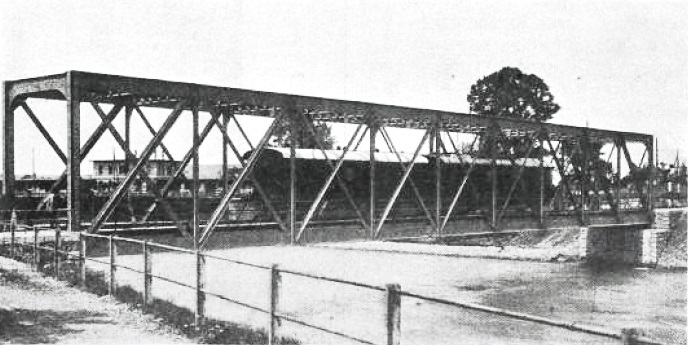
Iron Aare bridge near Thun in the early years

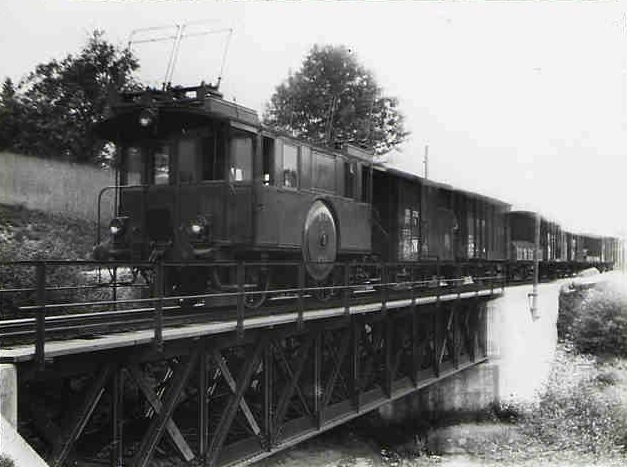
Freight train hauled by locomotive No. 2 on the Rotachen bridge between Heimberg and Brenzikofen

The line runs from Burgdorf, where the line has its own section of the station, for seven kilometres over the Solothurn–Langnau railway (Emmental Railway) in the valley of Emme through the stations of Steinhof, Oberburg and Hasle-Rüegsau. The Emmental-Burgdorf-Thun-Bahn built a new workshop in Oberburg in the 1970s.

The route of the former Burgdorf-Thun-Bahn begins in Hasle-Rüegsau. It runs on an almost constant grade along the Biglenbach through Schafhausen, Bigenthal, Walkringen to Biglen to the highest point on the line at 770 metres above sea level. The line continues almost levelly through the two short Grosshöchstetten I and II tunnels. After Grosshöchstetten, a loop provides views of the Bernese Alps. In Konolfingen, where the workshop of BTB was located, the Burgdorf–Thun railway crosses the Bern–Lucerne railway. The line follows the Chise through the localities of Stalden, Oberdiessbach and Brenzikofen. After Heimberg tunnel and the stations of Heimberg and Steffisburg, the line reaches the Aare bridge near Schwäbis to reach the terminus of Thun.
