= Heimberg, Switzerland =

Heimberg
- Municipality
- Flag Coat of arms
- Location of Heimberg
- Location within Switzerland Location within Canton of Bern
- Coordinates: 46°47′N 7°36′E
- Country: Switzerland
- Canton: Bern
- District: Thun

Government
  - Mayor: Niklaus Röthlisberger

Area
  - Total: 5.4 km^{2} (2.1 sq mi)
- Elevation: 551 m (1,808 ft)

Population (Dec 2012)
  - Total: 6,465
  - Density: 1,200/km^{2} (3,100/sq mi)
- Time zone: UTC+01:00 (CET)
  - Summer (DST): UTC+02:00 (CEST)
- Postal code: 3627
- SFOS number: 928
- ISO 3166 code: CH-BE
- Surrounded by: Brenzikofen, Fahrni, Kiesen, Oppligen, Steffisburg, Thun, Uetendorf, Uttigen
- Website: www.heimberg.ch

Heimberg (Swiss Standard German pronunciation: [ˈhaɪmbɛrɡ]) is a municipality in the administrative district of Thun in the canton of Bern in Switzerland.

== History ==
Aerial view from 200 m by Walter Mittelholzer (1925)

Heimberg is first mentioned in 1146 as Heimberc.

The oldest trace of a settlement in the area are the Roman settlement ruins near Bühlacker. By the Middle Ages the village existed and was ruled by the Freiherr von Heimberg. Very little is known about the family. They appear in historical records from 1146 until 1175 and then vanish. By 1191 the Zähringens owned the village. It was later divided and inherited by the Counts of Kyburg and the Counts of Buchegg. In 1259 Buchegg donated their portion to Interlaken Monastery but the Kyburgs retained their half ownership and, apparently, full control over the village. After a failed raid on Solothurn on 11 November 1382 and the resulting Burgdorferkrieg, the Kyburgs lost most of their lands to Bern in 1384. The city of Bern then passed the half portion of the village to the Bernese Schultheiss Ludwig von Seftigen to rule as a private dominion within the Steffisburg court under the Thun District. Presumably after the 1528 conversion of Bern to the new faith of the Protestant Reformation and suppression of Interlaken Monastery, the two halves of the village were combined. The village passed through a number of Bernese patrician families over the following centuries.

The village was part of the parish of Thun until 1536, when it became part of the Steffisburg parish.

For most of its history Heimberg consisted of scattered farm houses in the floodplains of the Aare, Zulg and Rotache rivers. The swampy valley floors provided rich soil but very limited space. The Aare River Correction projects of 1871-76 constrained the river and drained the marshy lands on the valley floor, which opened up new housing and farm land. At around the same time the construction of the Bern-Thun road and the Burgdorf-Thun railroad connected the village with several nearby cities. The road and navigable Aare river brought about 80 import/export and transport companies to Heimberg in the mid-19th century. When it began to decline in the 1870s, the growing municipality began supporting industry in Thun. After World War II the population of Heimberg expanded rapidly and new developments sprang up around the old village, including Hubel-Bäumberg and Kaliforni as well as the Winterhalde industrial park. A school was built in Au in 1953-56 and replaced in 1975–86, and followed by a secondary school in 1981. The village church was built in 1939, followed by a second church in Kaliforni in 1979. Heimberg split away from the Steffisburg parish to form its own parish in 1988.

== Geography ==
Heimberg has an area of 5.44 km^{2} (2.10 sq mi). As of 2013, a total of 1.4 km^{2} (0.54 mi^{2}) or 25.7% is used for agricultural purposes, while 1.88 km^{2} (0.73 mi^{2}) or 34.6% is forested. The rest of the municipality is 2.02 km^{2} (0.78 mi^{2}) or 37.1% is settled (buildings or roads), 0.10 km^{2} (25 acres) or 1.8% is either rivers or lakes.

During the same year, industrial buildings made up 5.9% of the total area while housing and buildings made up 16.7% and transportation infrastructure made up 10.1%, while parks, green belts and sports fields made up 1.8%. All of the forested land area is covered with heavy forests. Of the agricultural land, 14.3% is used for growing crops and 10.8% is pasturage. Of the water in the municipality, 0.1% is in lakes and 1.7% is in rivers and streams.

The municipality is located on the right bank of the Aare river, between the Rotache river in the north and the Zulg river in the south. It includes the village of Thungschneit which became part of the municipality in 1869.

On 31 December 2009 Amtsbezirk Thun, the municipality's former district, was dissolved. On the following day, 1 January 2010, it joined the newly created Verwaltungskreis Thun.

== Coat of arms ==
The blazon of the municipal coat of arms is Azure a Lamb passant Argent holding a flag of the same cross Gules with Tassels Or on a Mount of 3 Coupeaux Vert.

== Demographics ==
Heimberg has a population (as of December 2020) of 6,968. As of 2012, 8.8% of the population are resident foreign nationals. Between the last 2 years (2010-2012) the population changed at a rate of 2.7%. Migration accounted for 2.4%, while births and deaths accounted for 0.2%.

Most of the population (as of 2000) speaks German (5,153 or 93.2%) as their first language, Albanian is the second most common (64 or 1.2%) and Italian is the third (55 or 1.0%). There are 29 people who speak French and 7 people who speak Romansh.

As of 2008, the population was 49.9% male and 50.1% female. The population was made up of 2,850 Swiss men (45.3% of the population) and 290 (4.6%) non-Swiss men. There were 2,924 Swiss women (46.4%) and 233 (3.7%) non-Swiss women. Of the population in the municipality, 1,177 or about 21.3% were born in Heimberg and lived there in 2000. There were 2,920 or 52.8% who were born in the same canton, while 663 or 12.0% were born somewhere else in Switzerland, and 579 or 10.5% were born outside of Switzerland.

As of 2012, children and teenagers (0–19 years old) make up 19.9% of the population, while adults (20–64 years old) make up 64.0% and seniors (over 64 years old) make up 16.1%.

As of 2000, there were 2,280 people who were single and never married in the municipality. There were 2,630 married individuals, 323 widows or widowers and 296 individuals who are divorced.

As of 2010, there were 809 households that consist of only one person and 150 households with five or more people. In 2000, a total of 2,182 apartments (94.3% of the total) were permanently occupied, while 77 apartments (3.3%) were seasonally occupied and 55 apartments (2.4%) were empty. As of 2012, the construction rate of new housing units was 6.5 new units per 1000 residents. The vacancy rate for the municipality, in 2013, was 0.4%. In 2012, single family homes made up 60.8% of the total housing in the municipality.

The historical population is given in the following chart:

== Economy ==
As of 2011, Heimberg had an unemployment rate of 1.95%. As of 2011, there were a total of 2,384 people employed in the municipality. Of these, there were 46 people employed in the primary economic sector and about 14 businesses involved in this sector. The secondary sector employs 596 people and there were 75 businesses in this sector. The tertiary sector employs 1,743 people, with 289 businesses in this sector. There were 3,050 residents of the municipality who were employed in some capacity, of which females made up 43.1% of the workforce.

In 2008 there were a total of 1,737 full-time equivalent jobs. The number of jobs in the primary sector was 22, all of which were in agriculture. The number of jobs in the secondary sector was 616 of which 343 or (55.7%) were in manufacturing, 29 or (4.7%) were in mining and 245 (39.8%) were in construction. The number of jobs in the tertiary sector was 1,099. In the tertiary sector; 620 or 56.4% were in wholesale or retail sales or the repair of motor vehicles, 20 or 1.8% were in the movement and storage of goods, 65 or 5.9% were in a hotel or restaurant, 64 or 5.8% were technical professionals or scientists, 52 or 4.7% were in education and 114 or 10.4% were in health care.

In 2000, there were 1,541 workers who commuted into the municipality and 2,225 workers who commuted away. The municipality is a net exporter of workers, with about 1.4 workers leaving the municipality for every one entering. A total of 824 workers (34.8% of the 2,365 total workers in the municipality) both lived and worked in Heimberg.

Of the working population, 14.4% used public transportation to get to work, and 54.8% used a private car.

The local and cantonal tax rate in Heimberg is one of the lowest in the canton. In 2012 the average local and cantonal tax rate on a married resident, with two children, of Heimberg making 150,000 CHF was 11.6%, while an unmarried resident's rate was 17.3%. For comparison, the average rate for the entire canton in 2011, was 14.2% and 22.0%, while the nationwide average was 12.3% and 21.1% respectively.

In 2010 there were a total of 2,973 tax payers in the municipality. Of that total, 944 made over 75,000 CHF per year. There were 21 people who made between 15,000 and 20,000 per year. The average income of the over 75,000 CHF group in Heimberg was 108,921 CHF, while the average across all of Switzerland was 131,244 CHF.

In 2011 a total of 2.6% of the population received direct financial assistance from the government.

== Politics ==
In the 2011 federal election the most popular party was the Swiss People's Party (SVP) which received 33.9% of the vote. The next three most popular parties were the Conservative Democratic Party (BDP) (17.1%), the Social Democratic Party (SP) (15.3%) and the Federal Democratic Union of Switzerland (EDU) (6.9%). In the federal election, a total of 2,097 votes were cast, and the voter turnout was 43.4%.

== Religion ==
From the 2000 census, 3,737 or 67.6% belonged to the Swiss Reformed Church, while 647 or 11.7% were Roman Catholic. Of the rest of the population, there were 28 members of an Orthodox church (or about 0.51% of the population), there were 3 individuals (or about 0.05% of the population) who belonged to the Christian Catholic Church, and there were 388 individuals (or about 7.02% of the population) who belonged to another Christian church. There were 173 (or about 3.13% of the population) who were Muslim. There were 14 individuals who were Buddhist, 32 individuals who were Hindu and 3 individuals who belonged to another church. 285 (or about 5.15% of the population) belonged to no church, are agnostic or atheist, and 219 individuals (or about 3.96% of the population) did not answer the question.

== Education ==
In Heimberg about 61.2% of the population have completed non-mandatory upper secondary education, and 15% have completed additional higher education (either university or a Fachhochschule). Of the 513 who had completed some form of tertiary schooling listed in the census, 75.6% were Swiss men, 17.2% were Swiss women, 4.3% were non-Swiss men and 2.9% were non-Swiss women.

The Canton of Bern school system provides one year of non-obligatory Kindergarten, followed by six years of Primary school. This is followed by three years of obligatory lower Secondary school where the students are separated according to ability and aptitude. Following the lower Secondary students may attend additional schooling or they may enter an apprenticeship.

During the 2012–13 school year, there were a total of 611 students attending classes in Heimberg. There were a total of 99 students in the German language kindergarten classes in the municipality. Of the kindergarten students, 14.1% were permanent or temporary residents of Switzerland (not citizens) and 18.2% have a different mother language than the classroom language. The municipality's primary school had 327 students in German language classes. Of the primary students, 13.8% were permanent or temporary residents of Switzerland (not citizens) and 22.3% have a different mother language than the classroom language. During the same year, the lower secondary school had a total of 185 students. There were 9.2% who were permanent or temporary residents of Switzerland (not citizens) and 18.4% have a different mother language than the classroom language.

As of 2000, there were a total of 699 students attending any school in the municipality. Of those, 693 both lived and attended school in the municipality, while 6 students came from another municipality. During the same year, 114 residents attended schools outside the municipality.

== Transportation ==
The municipality has two railway stations, Lädeli and Heimberg, on the Burgdorf–Thun line. Between them there is regular service to Thun, Konolfingen, and Solothurn.
