= Brenzikofen =

- Municipality
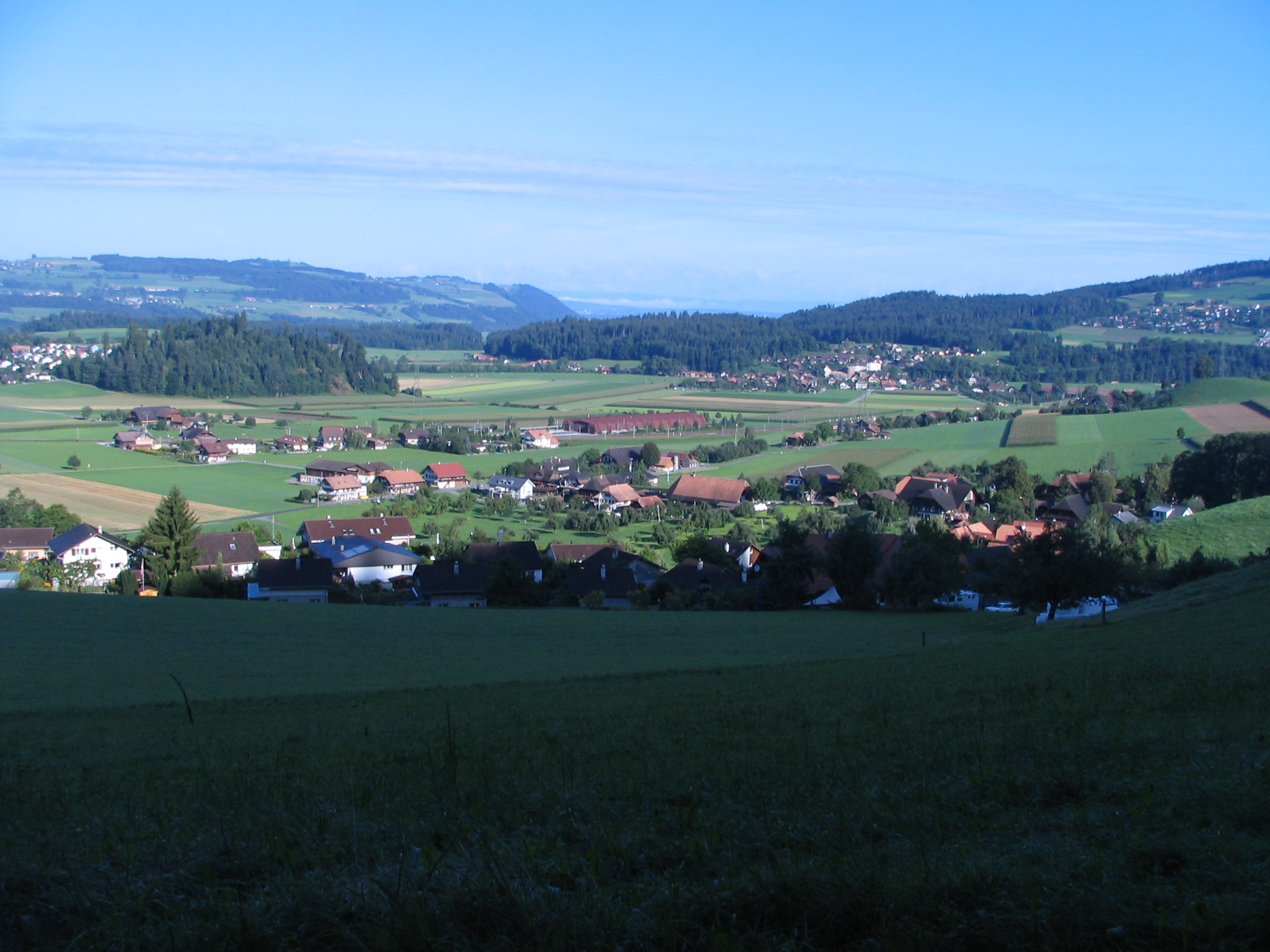

- Flag Coat of arms
- Location of Brenzikofen
- Location within Switzerland Location within Canton of Bern
- Coordinates: 46°49′N 7°37′E
- Country: Switzerland
- Canton: Bern
- District: Bern-Mittelland

Government
  - Executive: Gemeinderat with 7 members
  - Mayor: Gemeindepräsident; Sandra Krähenbühl (as of 2026)

Area
  - Total: 2.2 km^{2} (0.85 sq mi)
- Elevation: 583 m (1,913 ft)

Population (December 2020)
  - Total: 481
  - Density: 220/km^{2} (570/sq mi)
- Time zone: UTC+01:00 (CET)
  - Summer (DST): UTC+02:00 (CEST)
- Postal code: 3671
- SFOS number: 606
- ISO 3166 code: CH-BE
- Surrounded by: Bleiken bei Oberdiessbach, Fahrni, Heimberg, Herbligen, Oberdiessbach, Oppligen
- Website: https://brenzikofen.ch/

Brenzikofen is a municipality in the Bern-Mittelland administrative district in the canton of Bern in Switzerland.

== History ==
Brenzikofen is first mentioned in 1236 as Brenzichovin.

During the Late Middle Ages Interlaken Monastery owned much of the land in the village. The remainder of the land was owned by wealthy citizens of the towns of Bern and Thun. During the Middle Ages, Diessenberg Castle was built on Bürglen hill above the village. Little is known about the castle and today only portions of the wall and ditch are still visible. Bern gradually acquired more rights in the village over the following centuries. In 1528, Bern adopted the Protestant Reformation and secularized Interlaken Monastery and all of its land holdings, including Brenzikofen. Beginning in 1652, it was part of the district of Thun. Following the 1798 French invasion, under the Helvetic Republic it became part of the district of Konolfingen. It has always remained part of the parish of Oberdiessbach.

The village was part of a school district with Herbligen until 1834. The district was reestablished in 1973, when a new school house was built. In 1898, the Burgdorf-Thun railroad built a station in Brenzikofen. In 1983, the central Army Catering Headquarters was established and became the major employer in the village.

== Geography ==
Brenzikofen has an area of 2.19 km^{2} (0.85 sq mi). Of this area, 1.19 km^{2} (0.46 mi^{2}) or 54.1% is used for agricultural purposes, while 0.82 km^{2} (0.32 mi^{2}) or 37.3% is forested. Of the rest of the land, 0.19 km^{2} (0.073 mi^{2}) or 8.6% is settled (buildings or roads), 0.01 km^{2} (2.5 acres) or 0.5% is either rivers or lakes.

Of the built up area, housing and buildings made up 5.0% and transportation infrastructure made up 2.7%. Out of the forested land, all of the forested land area is covered with heavy forests. Of the agricultural land, 28.6% is used for growing crops and 20.0% is pastures, while 5.5% is used for orchards or vine crops. All the water in the municipality is flowing water.

The municipality is located at the foot of the Falkenfluh peak, and stretches to the Rothachengraben. It includes the village of Brenzikofen and the village sections of Boden and Bälliz as well as scattered individual farm houses.

On 31 December 2009 Amtsbezirk Konolfingen, the municipality's former district, was dissolved. On the following day, 1 January 2010, it joined the newly created Verwaltungskreis Bern-Mittelland.

== Coat of arms ==
The blazon of the municipal coat of arms is Gules a Lion rampant Or holding in dexter above his head a Sword of the same.

== Demographics ==
Brenzikofen has a population (as of December 2020) of 481. As of 2010, 2.1% of the population are resident foreign nationals. Over the last 10 years (2001-2011) the population has changed at a rate of -2.3%. Migration accounted for -3%, while births and deaths accounted for 0.6%.

Most of the population (as of 2000) speaks German (480 or 99.0%) as their first language, Danish is the second most common (2 or 0.4%) and English is the third (1 or 0.2%).

As of 2008, the population was 49.7% male and 50.3% female. The population was made up of 259 Swiss men (48.8% of the population) and 5 (0.9%) non-Swiss men. There were 261 Swiss women (49.2%) and 6 (1.1%) non-Swiss women. Of the population in the municipality, 153 or about 31.5% were born in Brenzikofen and lived there in 2000. There were 258 or 53.2% who were born in the same canton, while 54 or 11.1% were born somewhere else in Switzerland, and 13 or 2.7% were born outside of Switzerland.

As of 2011, children and teenagers (0–19 years old) make up 21.8% of the population, while adults (20–64 years old) make up 64.5% and seniors (over 64 years old) make up 13.7%.

As of 2000, there were 216 people who were single and never married in the municipality. There were 227 married individuals, 24 widows or widowers and 18 individuals who are divorced.

As of 2000, there were 55 households that consist of only one person and 18 households with five or more people. In 2000, a total of 184 apartments (90.2% of the total) were permanently occupied, while 13 apartments (6.4%) were seasonally occupied and 7 apartments (3.4%) were empty. The vacancy rate for the municipality, in 2011, was 1.72%.

The historical population is given in the following chart:

== Politics ==
In the 2011 federal election the most popular party was the Swiss People's Party (SVP) which received 39.9% of the vote. The next three most popular parties were the Conservative Democratic Party (BDP) (18%), the Social Democratic Party (SP) (10.8%) and the Green Party (7.1%). In the federal election, a total of 217 votes were cast, and the voter turnout was 52.3%.

== Economy ==
As of 2011, Brenzikofen had an unemployment rate of 1.14%. As of 2008, there were a total of 118 people employed in the municipality. Of these, there were 25 people employed in the primary economic sector and about 10 businesses involved in this sector. 12 people were employed in the secondary sector and there were 4 businesses in this sector. 81 people were employed in the tertiary sector, with 19 businesses in this sector. There were 263 residents of the municipality who were employed in some capacity, of which females made up 43.0% of the workforce.

In 2008 there were a total of 83 full-time equivalent jobs. The number of jobs in the primary sector was 16, all of which were in agriculture. The number of jobs in the secondary sector was 10 of which 9 were in manufacturing and 1 was in construction. The number of jobs in the tertiary sector was 57. In the tertiary sector; 11 or 19.3% were in wholesale or retail sales or the repair of motor vehicles, 3 or 5.3% were in the movement and storage of goods, 6 or 10.5% were in a hotel or restaurant, 2 or 3.5% were in the information industry, 3 or 5.3% were technical professionals or scientists, 4 or 7.0% were in education and 1 was in health care.

In 2000, there were 82 workers who commuted into the municipality and 199 workers who commuted away. The municipality is a net exporter of workers, with about 2.4 workers leaving the municipality for every one entering. Of the working population, 13.7% used public transportation to get to work, and 57.4% used a private car.

== Religion ==
From the 2000 census, 416 or 85.8% belonged to the Swiss Reformed Church, while 17 or 3.5% were Roman Catholic. Of the rest of the population, there were 24 individuals (or about 4.95% of the population) who belonged to another Christian church. There was 1 individual who was Jewish, and 29 (or about 5.98% of the population) belonged to no church, are agnostic or atheist, and 10 individuals (or about 2.06% of the population) did not answer the question.

== Education ==
In Brenzikofen about 209 or (43.1%) of the population have completed non-mandatory upper secondary education, and 54 or (11.1%) have completed additional higher education (either university or a Fachhochschule). Of the 54 who completed tertiary schooling, 72.2% were Swiss men, 27.8% were Swiss women.

The Canton of Bern school system provides one year of non-obligatory Kindergarten, followed by six years of Primary school. This is followed by three years of obligatory lower Secondary school where the students are separated according to ability and aptitude. Following the lower Secondary students may attend additional schooling or they may enter an apprenticeship.

During the 2010-11 school year, there were a total of 50 students attending classes in Brenzikofen. There were no kindergarten classes in the municipality. The municipality had 2 primary classes and 25 students. Of the primary students, 8.0% have a different mother language than the classroom language. During the same year, there was one lower secondary class with a total of 25 students. There were 4.0% who were permanent or temporary residents of Switzerland (not citizens) and 4.0% have a different mother language than the classroom language.

As of 2000, there were 4 students in Brenzikofen who came from another municipality, while 37 residents attended schools outside the municipality.

== Transportation ==
The municipality has a railway station, Brenzikofen, on the Burgdorf–Thun line. It has regular service to Thun and Konolfingen.
