= Niklaus von Diesbach =

Niklaus von Diesbach may refer to:

- Niklaus von Diesbach (merchant) (c. 1375/1380 – c. 1436), Bernese merchant and banker, progenitor of the noble Diesbach family
- Niklaus von Diesbach (politician) (1430–1475), Schultheiss of Bern and diplomat, his grandson
- Niklaus von Diesbach (1478–1550), who had the old castle at Oberdiessbach built in 1546, see Oberdiessbach Castle
- Niklaus von Diesbach (1645–1721), general of the Bernese troops in the Toggenburg War

== See also ==
- Diesbach family
