= Bleiken bei Oberdiessbach =

- Former municipality
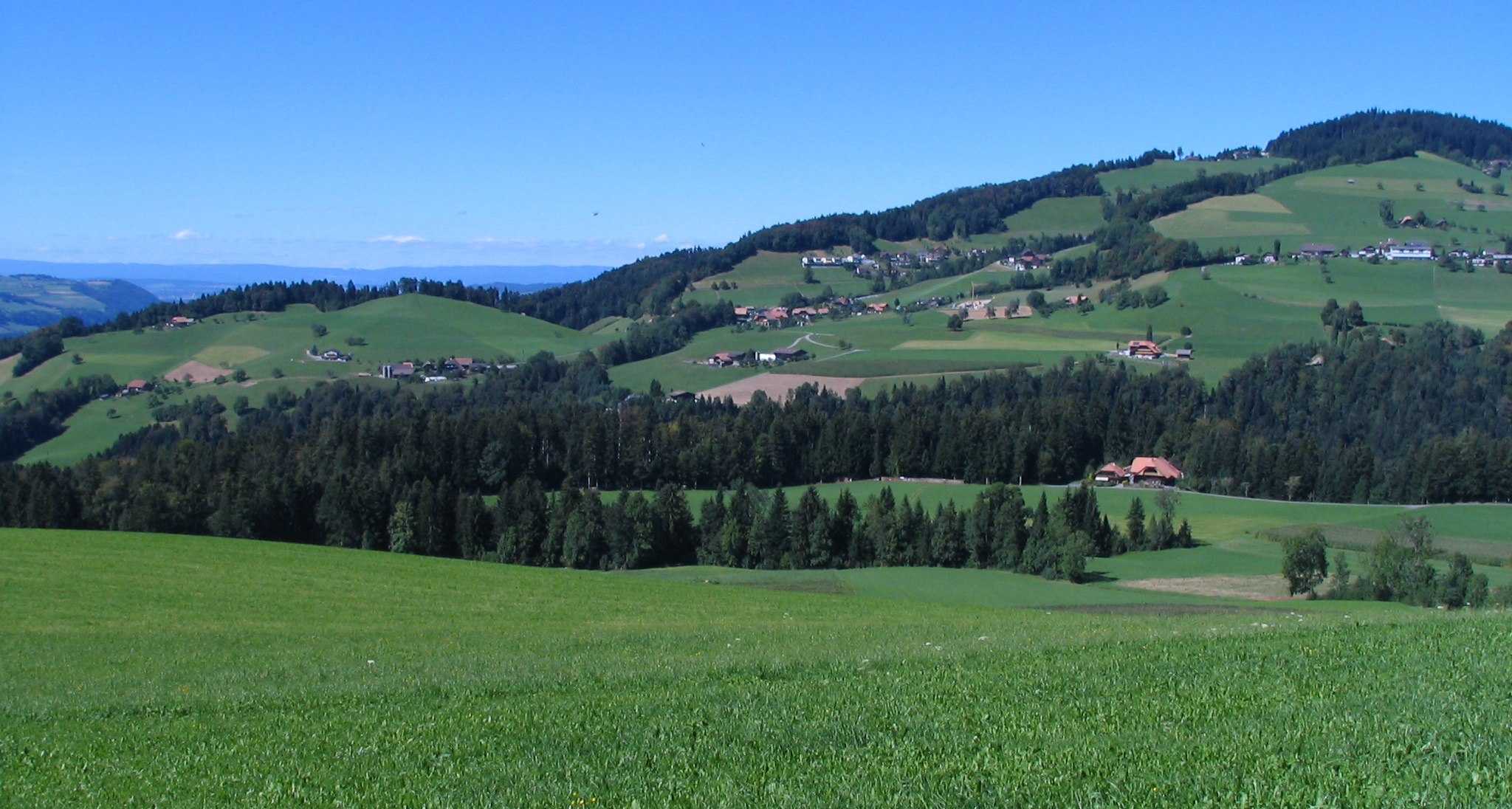

- Flag Coat of arms
- Location of Bleiken bei Oberdiessbach
- Location within Switzerland Location within Canton of Bern
- Coordinates: 46°49′N 7°38′E
- Country: Switzerland
- Canton: Bern
- District: Bern-Mittelland administrative district

Area
  - Total: 3.6 km^{2} (1.4 sq mi)
- Elevation: 874 m (2,867 ft)

Population (Dec 2011)
  - Total: 391
  - Density: 110/km^{2} (280/sq mi)
- Time zone: UTC+01:00 (CET)
  - Summer (DST): UTC+02:00 (CEST)
- Postal code: 3674
- SFOS number: 604
- ISO 3166 code: CH-BE
- Surrounded by: Aeschlen, Brenzikofen, Buchholterberg, Fahrni, Herbligen, Oberdiessbach
- Website: SFSO statistics

Bleiken bei Oberdiessbach is a former municipality in the Bern-Mittelland administrative district in the canton of Bern in Switzerland. On 1 January 2014 the former municipality of Bleiken bei Oberdiessbach merged into the municipality of Oberdiessbach.

== History ==
Bleiken bei Oberdiessbach is first mentioned in 1337 as Bleikon. In 1473 it was mentioned simply as villages (Dörfer).

The village was settled rather later than many of the nearby villages. In 1880 a medical spa resort was built in the village. The spa eventually closed and the building is now an apartment complex. Even after the spa was built, the village remained isolated. In 1908 a Postauto route was established which connected Bleiken with Oberdiessbach. Today, over half of the working population commutes to jobs in Oberdiessbach and nearly three-quarters of the jobs in the village are in agriculture or small business.

== Geography ==
Before the merger, Bleiken bei Oberdiessbach had a total area of 3.4 km^{2} (1.3 mi^{2}). Of this area, 1.98 km^{2} (0.76 mi^{2}) or 57.9% is used for agricultural purposes, while 1.28 km^{2} (0.49 mi^{2}) or 37.4% is forested. Of the rest of the land, 0.14 km^{2} (35 acres) or 4.1% is settled (buildings or roads) and 0.01 km^{2} (2.5 acres) or 0.3% is unproductive land.

Of the built up area, housing and buildings made up 3.2% and transportation infrastructure made up 0.9%. Out of the forested land, all of the forested land area is covered with heavy forests. Of the agricultural land, 8.5% is used for growing crops and 47.4% is pastures, while 2.0% is used for orchards or vine crops.

It lies 7 km (4.3 mi) to the north of the town of Thun. It is located between the Rothachen canyon and the Äschlenalp mountain. It includes the hamlets of Kirch (located in the center), Oberbleiken, Niederbleiken and Egglen as well as scattered individual farm houses.

On 31 December 2009 Amtsbezirk Konolfingen, the municipality's former district, was dissolved. On the following day, 1 January 2010, it joined the newly created Verwaltungskreis Bern-Mittelland.

== Coat of arms ==
The blazon of the municipal coat of arms is Vert on a Bend Argent a Torch Sable inflamed Gules.

== Demographics ==
Bleiken bei Oberdiessbach had a population (as of 2011) of 391. As of 2010, 1.3% of the population are resident foreign nationals. Over the last 10 years (2000-2010) the population has changed at a rate of 0.5%. Migration accounted for -4.7%, while births and deaths accounted for 4.2%.

Most of the population (as of 2000) speaks German (367 or 97.1%) as their first language, Albanian is the second most common (9 or 2.4%) and French is the third (1 or 0.3%). There is 1 person who speaks Italian.

As of 2008, the population was 51.6% male and 48.4% female. The population was made up of 196 Swiss men (51.0% of the population) and 2 (0.5%) non-Swiss men. There were 183 Swiss women (47.7%) and 3 (0.8%) non-Swiss women. Of the population in the municipality, 142 or about 37.6% were born in Bleiken bei Oberdiessbach and lived there in 2000. There were 177 or 46.8% who were born in the same canton, while 32 or 8.5% were born somewhere else in Switzerland, and 18 or 4.8% were born outside of Switzerland.

As of 2010, children and teenagers (0–19 years old) make up 29.9% of the population, while adults (20–64 years old) make up 56.8% and seniors (over 64 years old) make up 13.3%.

As of 2000, there were 181 people who were single and never married in the municipality. There were 167 married individuals, 18 widows or widowers and 12 individuals who are divorced.

As of 2000, there were 31 households that consist of only one person and 24 households with five or more people. In 2000, a total of 127 apartments (83.6% of the total) were permanently occupied, while 19 apartments (12.5%) were seasonally occupied and 6 apartments (3.9%) were empty.

The historical population is given in the following chart:

== Heritage sites of national significance ==
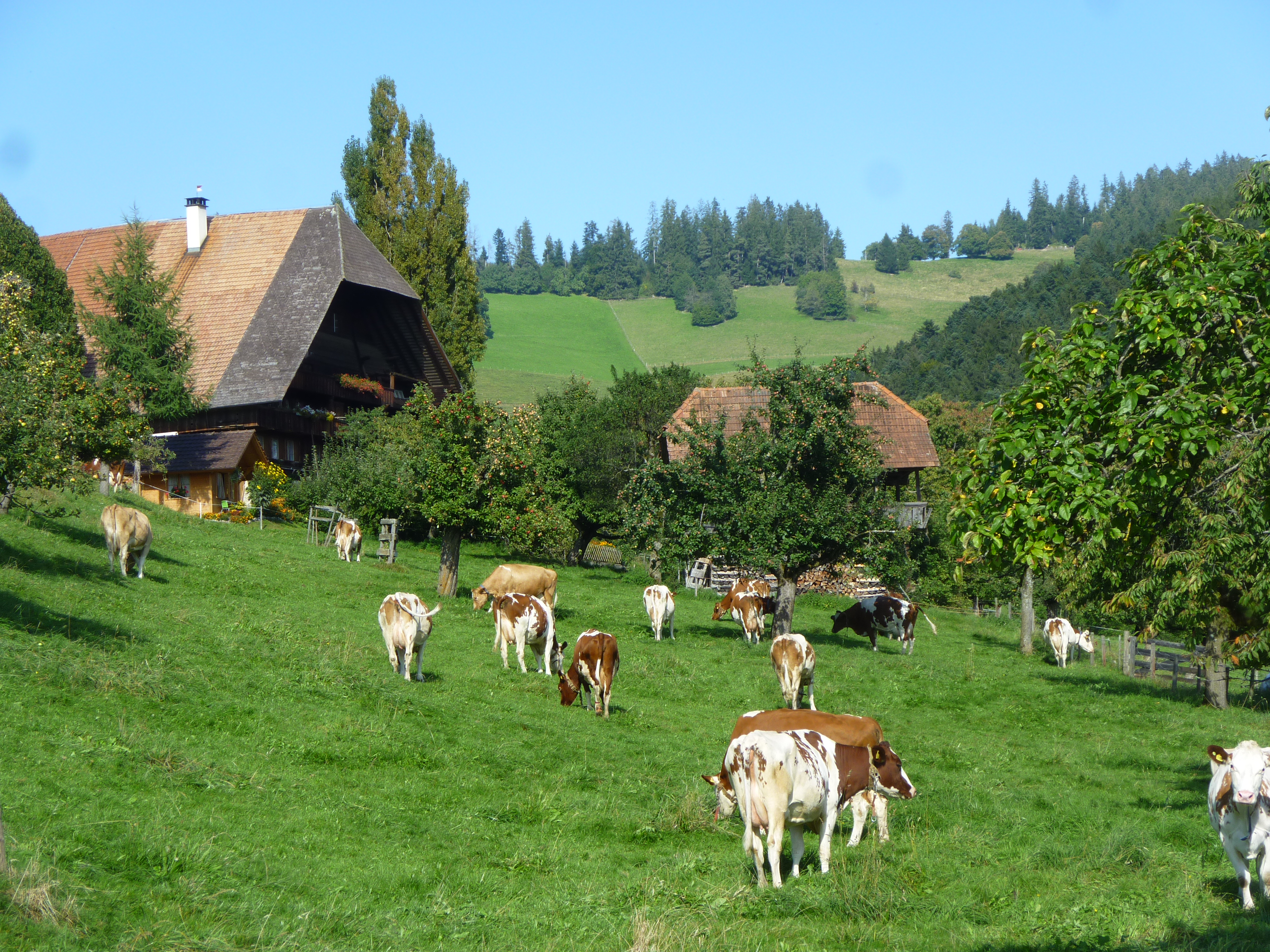
The Statthalterhof with its fields and cattle

The Statthalterhof is listed as a Swiss heritage site of national significance.

== Politics ==
In the 2011 federal election the most popular party was the Swiss People's Party (SVP) which received 53.6% of the vote. The next three most popular parties were the Federal Democratic Union of Switzerland (EDU) (11.9%), the Social Democratic Party (SP) (8.6%) and the Conservative Democratic Party (BDP) (7.1%). In the federal election, a total of 148 votes were cast, and the voter turnout was 49.8%.

== Economy ==
As of 2011, Bleiken bei Oberdiessbach had an unemployment rate of 0.51%. As of 2008, there were a total of 73 people employed in the municipality. Of these, there were 38 people employed in the primary economic sector and about 13 businesses involved in this sector. 10 people were employed in the secondary sector and there were 3 businesses in this sector. 25 people were employed in the tertiary sector, with 8 businesses in this sector. There were 192 residents of the municipality who were employed in some capacity, of which females made up 41.7% of the workforce.

In 2008 there were a total of 49 full-time equivalent jobs. The number of jobs in the primary sector was 23, all of which were in agriculture. The number of jobs in the secondary sector was 9, all of which were in construction. The number of jobs in the tertiary sector was 17. In the tertiary sector; 2 or 11.8% were in wholesale or retail sales or the repair of motor vehicles, 1 was in the movement and storage of goods, 6 or 35.3% were in a hotel or restaurant, 5 or 29.4% were in education.

In 2000, there were 13 workers who commuted into the municipality and 139 workers who commuted away. The municipality is a net exporter of workers, with about 10.7 workers leaving the municipality for every one entering. Of the working population, 8.3% used public transportation to get to work, and 58.9% used a private car.

== Religion ==
From the 2000 census, 9 or 2.4% were Roman Catholic, while 288 or 76.2% belonged to the Swiss Reformed Church. Of the rest of the population, there were 70 individuals (or about 18.52% of the population) who belonged to another Christian church. There were 10 (or about 2.65% of the population) who were Islamic. 27 (or about 7.14% of the population) belonged to no church, are agnostic or atheist, and 9 individuals (or about 2.38% of the population) did not answer the question.

== Education ==
In Bleiken bei Oberdiessbach about 145 or (38.4%) of the population have completed non-mandatory upper secondary education, and 26 or (6.9%) have completed additional higher education (either university or a Fachhochschule). Of the 26 who completed tertiary schooling, 76.9% were Swiss men, 19.2% were Swiss women.

The Canton of Bern school system provides one year of non-obligatory Kindergarten, followed by six years of Primary school. This is followed by three years of obligatory lower Secondary school where the students are separated according to ability and aptitude. Following the lower Secondary students may attend additional schooling or they may enter an apprenticeship.

During the 2010-11 school year, there were a total of 55 students attending classes in Bleiken bei Oberdiessbach. There was one kindergarten class with a total of 8 students in the municipality. The municipality had 2 primary classes and 37 students. During the same year, there was one lower secondary class with a total of 10 students.

As of 2000, there were 3 students in Bleiken bei Oberdiessbach who came from another municipality, while 10 residents attended schools outside the municipality.
