= Herbligen =

- Municipality
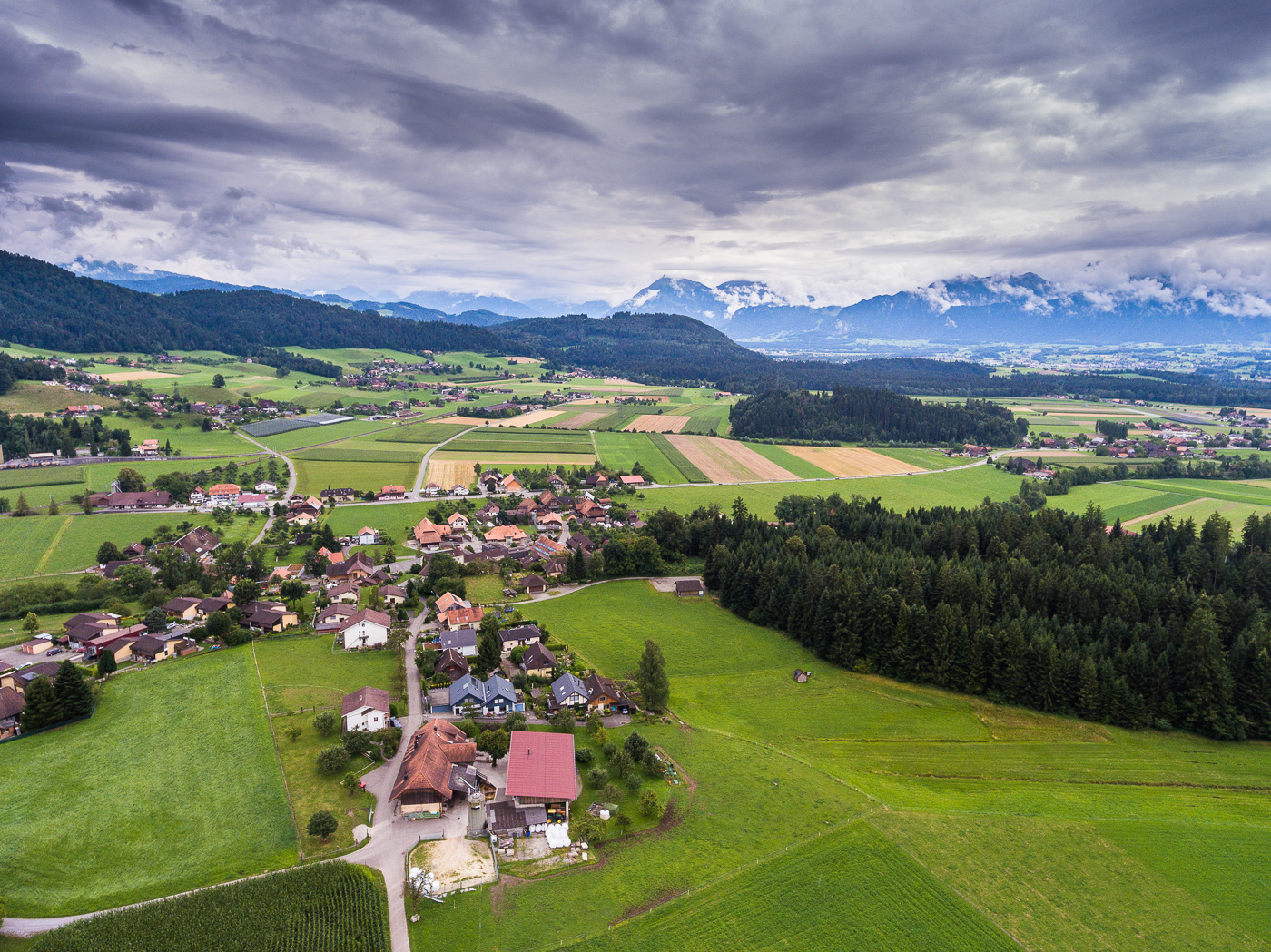

- Flag Coat of arms
- Location of Herbligen
- Location within Switzerland Location within Canton of Bern
- Coordinates: 46°50′N 7°36′E
- Country: Switzerland
- Canton: Bern
- District: Bern-Mittelland

Government
  - Executive: Gemeinderat with 7 members
  - Mayor: Gemeindepräsident; Rudolf Scheidegger (as of 2026)

Area
  - Total: 2.7 km^{2} (1.0 sq mi)
- Elevation: 578 m (1,896 ft)

Population (December 2020)
  - Total: 593
  - Density: 220/km^{2} (570/sq mi)
- Time zone: UTC+01:00 (CET)
  - Summer (DST): UTC+02:00 (CEST)
- Postal code: 3671
- SFOS number: 610
- ISO 3166 code: CH-BE
- Surrounded by: Bleiken bei Oberdiessbach, Brenzikofen, Oberdiessbach, Oppligen, Wichtrach
- Website: www.herbligen.ch

Herbligen is a municipality in the Bern-Mittelland administrative district in the canton of Bern in Switzerland.

== History ==
Herbligen is first mentioned in 1302.

The earliest trace of a settlement in the area is a large prehistoric fortification on the Eggrain and Wolfenburg hill. The Helisbühl hill may be an artificially created hill from around the same era. During the Late Middle Ages many wealthy citizens of Bern and Thun owned land or rights in the village. The village formed a school district with the neighboring village of Brenzikofen in 1665. The two communities built a school house at Helisbühl. The school was in operation for almost two centuries, before it was abandoned in 1834. A new school house was built in the area in 1973. Beginning in the 1980s many commuters from Bern and Thun settled in Herbligen causing a construction boom. Today the village is mostly a bedroom community with almost two-thirds of the working population commuting to the cities for work.

== Geography ==
Herbligen has an area of 2.76 km^{2} (1.07 sq mi). Of this area, 1.31 km^{2} (0.51 mi^{2}) or 47.5% is used for agricultural purposes, while 1.1 km^{2} (0.42 mi^{2}) or 39.9% is forested. Of the rest of the land, 0.32 km^{2} (0.12 mi^{2}) or 11.6% is settled (buildings or roads) and 0.01 km^{2} (2.5 acres) or 0.4% is unproductive land.

Of the built up area, industrial buildings made up 1.1% of the total area while housing and buildings made up 5.1% and transportation infrastructure made up 5.1%. Out of the forested land, 38.8% of the total land area is heavily forested and 1.1% is covered with orchards or small clusters of trees. Of the agricultural land, 25.7% is used for growing crops and 19.2% is pastures, while 2.5% is used for orchards or vine crops.

The municipality is located in the lower Kiesen Valley and includes the hamlets of Herbligen, Hubel and Helisbühl as well as scattered individual farm houses. It is part of the parish of Oberdiessbach.

On 31 December 2009 Amtsbezirk Konolfingen, the municipality's former district, was dissolved. On the following day, 1 January 2010, it joined the newly created Verwaltungskreis Bern-Mittelland.

== Coat of arms ==
The blazon of the municipal coat of arms is Azure a Scythe Argent.

== Demographics ==
Herbligen has a population (as of December 2020) of 593. As of 2010, 4.5% of the population are resident foreign nationals. Over the last 10 years (2001-2011) the population has changed at a rate of 0.9%. Migration accounted for 0.2%, while births and deaths accounted for 1.1%.

Most of the population (as of 2000) speaks German (492 or 98.4%) as their first language, French and Portuguese (both with 3 or 0.6%) are the next most common.

As of 2008, the population was 49.6% male and 50.4% female. The population was made up of 263 Swiss men (47.8% of the population) and 10 (1.8%) non-Swiss men. There were 262 Swiss women (47.6%) and 15 (2.7%) non-Swiss women. Of the population in the municipality, 180 or about 36.0% were born in Herbligen and lived there in 2000. There were 254 or 50.8% who were born in the same canton, while 46 or 9.2% were born somewhere else in Switzerland, and 14 or 2.8% were born outside of Switzerland.

As of 2011, children and teenagers (0–19 years old) make up 22% of the population, while adults (20–64 years old) make up 61.3% and seniors (over 64 years old) make up 16.8%.

As of 2000, there were 205 people who were single and never married in the municipality. There were 267 married individuals, 18 widows or widowers and 10 individuals who are divorced.

As of 2000, there were 50 households that consist of only one person and 21 households with five or more people. In 2000, a total of 187 apartments (93.5% of the total) were permanently occupied, while 5 apartments (2.5%) were seasonally occupied and 8 apartments (4.0%) were empty. As of 2010, the construction rate of new housing units was 1.8 new units per 1000 residents. The vacancy rate for the municipality, in 2011, was 2.05%.

The historical population is given in the following chart:

== Politics ==
In the 2011 federal election the most popular party was the Swiss People's Party (SVP) which received 37.2% of the vote. The next three most popular parties were the Federal Democratic Union of Switzerland (EDU) (18.5%), the Conservative Democratic Party (BDP) (15.2%) and the Social Democratic Party (SP) (9.2%). In the federal election, a total of 203 votes were cast, and the voter turnout was 46.9%.

== Economy ==
As of 2011, Herbligen had an unemployment rate of 1.15%. As of 2008, there were a total of 127 people employed in the municipality. Of these, there were 50 people employed in the primary economic sector and about 16 businesses involved in this sector. 21 people were employed in the secondary sector and there were 6 businesses in this sector. 56 people were employed in the tertiary sector, with 12 businesses in this sector. There were 260 residents of the municipality who were employed in some capacity, of which females made up 40.4% of the workforce.

In 2008 there were a total of 82 full-time equivalent jobs. The number of jobs in the primary sector was 27, all of which were in agriculture. The number of jobs in the secondary sector was 17 of which 11 or (64.7%) were in manufacturing and 6 (35.3%) were in construction. The number of jobs in the tertiary sector was 38. In the tertiary sector; 1 was in wholesale or retail sales or the repair of motor vehicles, 1 was in the movement and storage of goods, 17 or 44.7% were in a hotel or restaurant, 3 or 7.9% were technical professionals or scientists, 5 or 13.2% were in education.

In 2000, there were 34 workers who commuted into the municipality and 193 workers who commuted away. The municipality is a net exporter of workers, with about 5.7 workers leaving the municipality for every one entering. Of the working population, 16.2% used public transportation to get to work, and 55.4% used a private car.

== Religion ==
From the 2000 census, 349 or 69.8% belonged to the Swiss Reformed Church, while 24 or 4.8% were Roman Catholic. Of the rest of the population, there were 180 individuals (or about 36.00% of the population) who belonged to another Christian church. There were 3 (or about 0.60% of the population) who were Islamic. 24 (or about 4.80% of the population) belonged to no church, are agnostic or atheist, and 7 individuals (or about 1.40% of the population) did not answer the question.

== Education ==
In Herbligen about 211 or (42.2%) of the population have completed non-mandatory upper secondary education, and 57 or (11.4%) have completed additional higher education (either university or a Fachhochschule). Of the 57 who completed tertiary schooling, 78.9% were Swiss men, 19.3% were Swiss women.

The Canton of Bern school system provides one year of non-obligatory Kindergarten, followed by six years of Primary school. This is followed by three years of obligatory lower Secondary school where the students are separated according to ability and aptitude. Following the lower Secondary students may attend additional schooling or they may enter an apprenticeship.

During the 2010-11 school year, there were a total of 62 students attending classes in Herbligen. There was one kindergarten class with a total of 19 students in the municipality. The municipality had 3 primary classes and 43 students.

As of 2000, there were 8 students in Herbligen who came from another municipality, while 36 residents attended schools outside the municipality.
