= Thomas Lüthi =

Swiss motorcycle racer (born 1986)

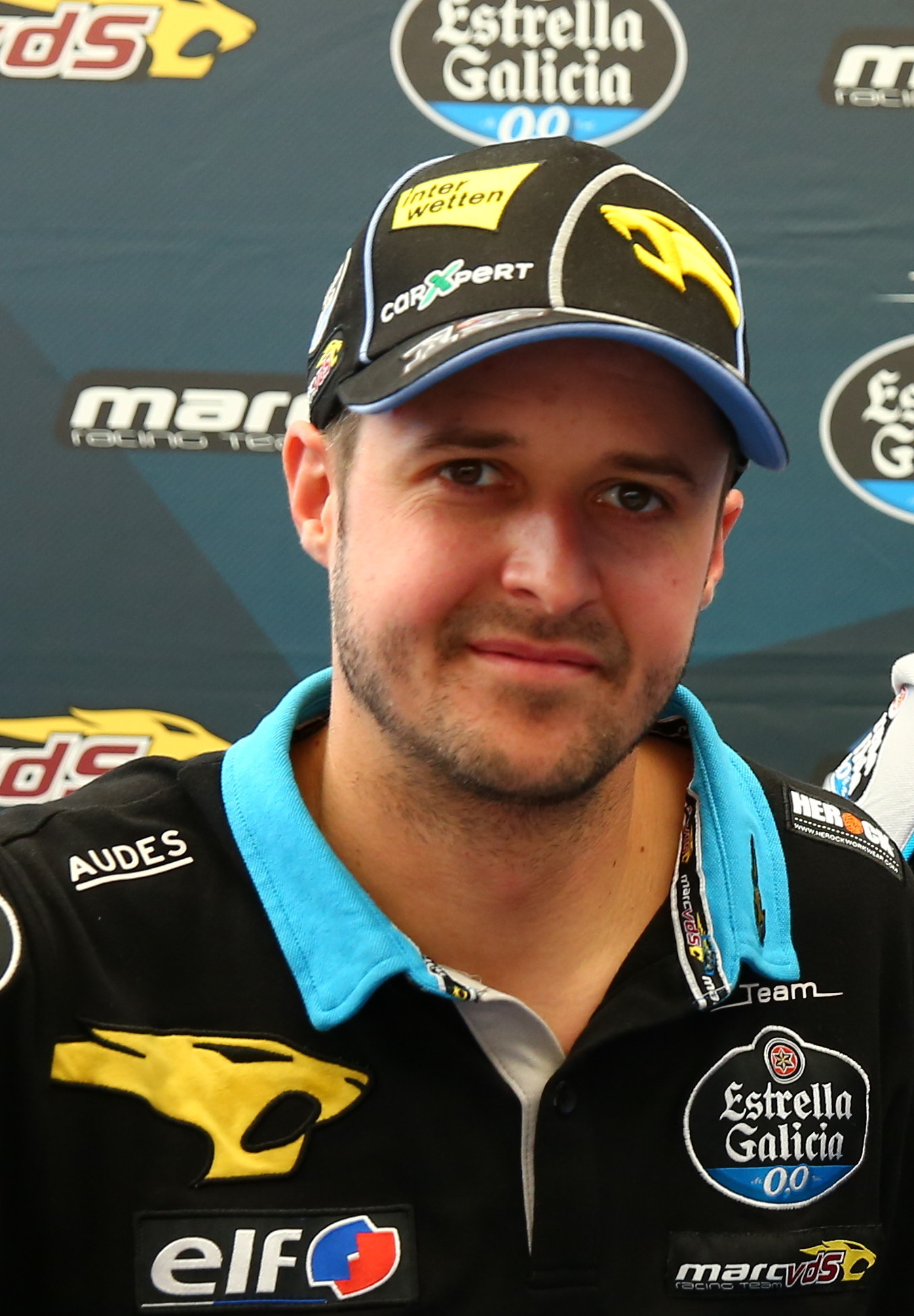
- Lüthi in 2018
- Nationality: Swiss
- Born: 6 September 1986 (age 40); Oberdiessbach, Switzerland
- Website: thomasluethi.ch
Motorcycle racing career statistics
MotoGP World Championship
Active years	2018
Manufacturers	Honda
Championships	0
2018 championship position	29th (0 pts)
Starts / Wins / Podiums / Poles / F. laps / Points; 18 / 0 / 0 / 0 / 0 / 0
Moto2 World Championship
Active years	2010–2017, 2019–2021
Manufacturers	Moriwaki, Suter, Kalex
Championships	0
2021 championship position	22nd (27 pts)
Starts / Wins / Podiums / Poles / F. laps / Points; 185 / 12 / 53 / 7 / 18 / 1852
250cc World Championship
Active years	2007–2009
Manufacturers	Aprilia
Championships	0
2009 championship position	7th (120 pts)
Starts / Wins / Podiums / Poles / F. laps / Points; 47 / 0 / 2 / 0 / 0 / 361
125cc World Championship
Active years	2002–2006
Manufacturers	Honda
Championships	1 (2005)
2006 championship position	8th (113 pts)
Starts / Wins / Podiums / Poles / F. laps / Points; 67 / 5 / 10 / 5 / 1 / 444

Thomas Lüthi (born 6 September 1986) is a Swiss sporting director at Prüstel GP, and former Grand Prix motorcycle racer. He spent 20 years in Grand Prix world championships, becoming one of only nine riders to reach 300 race starts, spending much of his career with the Interwetten Paddock team, with who he became the 2005 season's 125cc world champion.

== Career ==
=== Early career ===
Lüthi was born in Oberdiessbach, Kanton Bern, Switzerland, but grew up in Emmental. Lüthi started racing pocket bikes at the age of nine. He won pocket bike championships in 1999 and 2000. In 2002, he finished second overall in the European 125cc Championship, and third in the German 125cc series.

=== 125cc World Championship ===
Lüthi made his first 125cc World Championship appearance at the 2002 German Grand Prix, which he finished in 26th place.

In the 2003 Grand Prix motorcycle racing season, Lüthi was invited by Daniel Epp to ride for his team, known as the "Elit Grand Prix Team"; Epp became his manager. Lüthi scored his first podium in Barcelona and ended in second place. In 2004, he retired from four races in a row, missed four races because of injury, and scored 14 points.

Andy Ibbott of California Superbike School started training Thomas during the 2005 season. Lüthi scored his first 125cc class Grand Prix win in 2005 at Le Mans, followed by three more victories that season, including one at his team's home race at Brno, Czech Republic. On 6 November 2005, Lüthi secured his first world championship in the 125cc class, the sixth-youngest person to do so; this took place at Valencia. While using a Honda RS125R kit, Lüthi won the world championship title in the 125cc class, being five points ahead of Mika Kallio. Lüthi was voted Swiss sportsman of the year in 2005 and also won the annual "Swiss Award" in the category of sport.

After winning the 2005 125cc World Championship, Lüthi was partnered by Sandro Cortese of Germany and the team name was changed to "Elit — Caffè Latte". He scored his only win and only podium of the season at the 2006 French Grand Prix. He lost his championship title to Álvaro Bautista.

=== 250cc World Championship ===
After the 2006 season, Lüthi moved on to 250cc. The team changed their name to "Emmi — Caffè Latte", and defected to Aprilia, racing on the Aprilia RSA 250.

For 2008, Lüthi continued with the Aprilia RSA 250. Daniel Epp also ran an Aprillia LE for Lukáš Pešek, under the Auto Kelly - CP branding. Lüthi did not have any podiums until the 2008 Italian GP, where he finished at the podium in third place. At Assen, he finished in second place behind Álvaro Bautista. At Brno, Lüthi crashed out of the race due to an apparent brake failure.

In 2009, Lüthi finished seventh overall in 250cc, although without a podium.

=== Moto2 World Championship ===
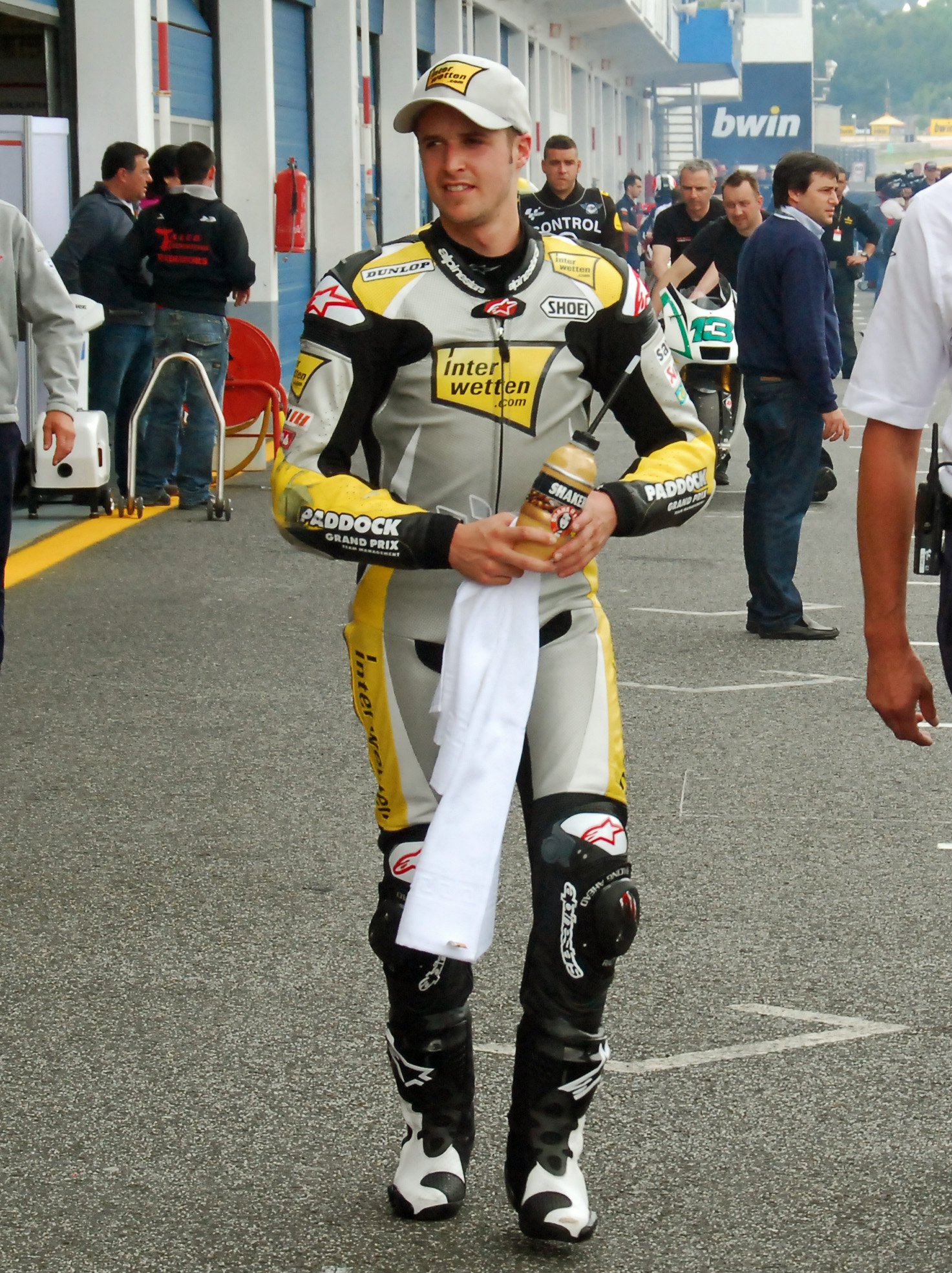
Lüthi at the 2011 Portuguese Grand Prix

For 2010, Lüthi remained with the team in the Moto2 class that replaced the 250cc category. At Silverstone, Lüthi finished in second place. Lüthi finished in third place at Assen, which was a position he acquired on the last lap after being in first place earlier in the race. Lüthi had a collarbone injury during those two races.

=== MotoGP World Championship ===
On 24 August 2017, it was announced that Lüthi would move up to MotoGP for the 2018 season, partnering Moto2 title rival Franco Morbidelli at EG 0,0 Marc VDS. Lüthi did not score a single point throughout his first MotoGP campaign, with his best result being 16th place at Losail, Le Mans, Brno, Phillip Island, and Sepang.

=== Return to Moto2 ===
On 12 August 2018, it was announced that Lüthi would step back to Moto2 for the 2019 season, joining Dynavolt Intact GP. He replaced Xavi Vierge, who moved to Marc VDS.

=== Retirement ===
On 19 August 2021, Lüthi announced his retirement from racing after the 2021 season. He will take on the role of Sports Director of the Prüstel GP Moto3 team, as well as their Junior Team, starting 2022.

== Career statistics ==
=== Grand Prix motorcycle racing ===
==== By season ====
Season	Class	Motorcycle	Type	Team	Race	Win	Podium	Pole	FLap	Pts	Plcd	WCh
2002	125cc	Honda	Honda RS125R	Elit Grand Prix	7	0	0	0	0	7	27th	–
2003	125cc	Honda	Honda RS125R	Elit Grand Prix	15	0	1	0	0	68	15th	–
2004	125cc	Honda	Honda RS125R	Elit Grand Prix	13	0	0	0	0	14	25th	–
2005	125cc	Honda	Honda RS125R	Elit Grand Prix	16	4	8	5	1	242	**1st**	1
2006	125cc	Honda	Honda RS125R	Elit – Caffe Latte	16	1	1	0	0	113	8th	–
2007	250cc	Aprilia	Aprilia RSA 250	Emmi – Caffe Latte	17	0	0	0	0	133	8th	–
2008	250cc	Aprilia	Aprilia RSA 250	Emmi – Caffe Latte	14	0	2	0	0	108	11th	–
2009	250cc	Aprilia	Aprilia RSA 250	Emmi – Caffe Latte	16	0	0	0	0	120	7th	–
2010	Moto2	Moriwaki	Moriwaki MD600	Interwetten Moriwaki Moto2	17	0	5	0	2	156	4th	–
2011	Moto2	Suter	Suter MMX2	Interwetten Paddock Moto2	17	1	4	1	0	151	5th	–
2012	Moto2	Suter	Suter MMX2	Interwetten-Paddock	17	1	6	1	3	191	4th	–
2013	Moto2	Suter	Suter MMX2	Interwetten Paddock Moto2	15	0	6	0	1	155	6th	–
2014	Moto2	Suter	Suter MMX2	Interwetten Paddock Moto2	18	2	4	0	2	194	4th	–
2015	Moto2	Kalex	Kalex Moto2	Derendinger Racing Interwetten	18	1	4	1	3	179	5th	–
2016	Moto2	Kalex	Kalex Moto2	Garage Plus Interwetten	17	4	6	3	2	234	**2nd**	–
2017	Moto2	Kalex	Kalex Moto2	Garage Plus Interwetten	16	2	10	1	1	243	**2nd**	–
2018	MotoGP	Honda	Honda RC213V	EG 0,0 Marc VDS	18	0	0	0	0	0	29th	–
2019	Moto2	Kalex	Kalex Moto2	Dynavolt Intact GP	18	1	8	0	4	250	**3rd**	–
2020	Moto2	Kalex	Kalex Moto2	Liqui Moly Intact GP	15	0	0	0	0	72	11th	–
2021	Moto2	Kalex	Kalex Moto2	Pertamina Mandalika SAG Team	17	0	0	0	0	27	22nd	–
Total					**317**	**17**	**65**	**12**	**19**	**2657**		**1**

==== By class ====
Class	Seasons	1st GP	1st Pod	1st Win	Race	Win	Podiums	Pole	FLap	Pts	WChmp
125cc	2002–2006	2002 Germany	2003 Catalunya	2005 France	67	5	10	5	1	444	1
250cc	2007–2009	2007 Qatar	2008 Italy		47	0	2	0	0	361	0
Moto2	2010–2017, 2019–2021	2010 Qatar	2010 Spain	2011 Malaysia	185	12	53	7	18	1852	0
MotoGP	2018	2018 Qatar			18	0	0	0	0	0	0
Total	2002–2021				**317**	**17**	**65**	**12**	**19**	**2657**	**1**

==== Races by year ====
(key) (Races in bold indicate pole position, races in italics indicate fastest lap)

Year	Class	Bike	1	2	3	4	5	6	7	8	9	10	11	12	13	14	15	16	17	18	19	Pos	Pts
2002	125cc	Honda	JPN	RSA	SPA	FRA	ITA	CAT	NED	GBR	GER; 26	CZE; 19	POR; 9	RIO; 24	PAC	MAL; 21	AUS; Ret	VAL; 24				27th	7
2003	125cc	Honda	JPN; 9	RSA; 17	SPA; 12	FRA; 9	ITA; 15	CAT; 2	NED; 7	GBR; 22	GER; Ret	CZE; Ret	POR; Ret	RIO; 15	PAC; 10	MAL; 4	AUS; 16	VAL; DNS				15th	68
2004	125cc	Honda	RSA; Ret	SPA; Ret	FRA; Ret	ITA; Ret	CAT	NED	RIO	GER; 18	GBR; 18	CZE; 18	POR; 16	JPN; 12	QAT; 13	MAL; 11	AUS; 19	VAL; 14				25th	14
2005	125cc	Honda	SPA; Ret	POR; 3	CHN; 4	**FRA**; 1	ITA; 2	CAT; 7	NED; 10	GBR; 6	GER; 2	**CZE**; 1	JPN; 2	**MAL**; 1	QAT; 6	**AUS**; 1	**TUR**; 5	VAL; 9				**1st**	**242**
2006	125cc	Honda	SPA; Ret	QAT; 8	TUR; 12	CHN; Ret	FRA; 1	ITA; 9	CAT; 6	NED; 8	GBR; 8	GER; 6	CZE; 5	MAL; 13	AUS; 4	JPN; Ret	POR; Ret	VAL; 10				8th	113
2007	250cc	Aprilia	QAT; 4	SPA; Ret	TUR; 5	CHN; 8	FRA; Ret	ITA; 5	CAT; 4	GBR; Ret	NED; Ret	GER; 9	CZE; 7	RSM; 4	POR; 4	JPN; 10	AUS; 5	MAL; 5	VAL; 9			8th	133
2008	250cc	Aprilia	QAT; 15	SPA; Ret	POR; 4	CHN; Ret	FRA; 11	ITA; 3	CAT; 5	GBR; 5	NED; 2	GER; 7	CZE; Ret	RSM; 7	INP; C	JPN	AUS	MAL; 9	VAL; 10			11th	108
2009	250cc	Aprilia	QAT; 6	JPN; 8	SPA; 5	FRA; Ret	ITA; 4	CAT; 6	NED; Ret	GER; 8	GBR; 9	CZE; Ret	INP; 9	RSM; 10	POR; 7	AUS; 11	MAL; 4	VAL; 4				7th	120
2010	Moto2	Moriwaki	QAT; 7	SPA; 3	FRA; 19	ITA; 4	GBR; 2	NED; 3	CAT; 2	GER; Ret	CZE; 11	INP; 7	RSM; 3	ARA; 10	JPN; 8	MAL; Ret	AUS; 11	POR; 16	VAL; 4			4th	156
2011	Moto2	Suter	QAT; 3	SPA; 2	POR; Ret	FRA; 5	CAT; Ret	GBR; 15	NED; 8	ITA; 6	GER; 5	CZE; 5	INP; 17	RSM; 8	ARA; 7	JPN; 3	AUS; 11	**MAL**; 1	VAL; 17			5th	151
2012	Moto2	Suter	**QAT**; 5	SPA; 3	POR; 3	FRA; 1	CAT; 2	GBR; 8	NED; Ret	GER; 5	ITA; 3	INP; 5	CZE; 2	RSM; 9	ARA; 10	JPN; 5	MAL; Ret	AUS; Ret	VAL; 4			4th	191
2013	Moto2	Suter	QAT	AME; DNS	SPA; 11	FRA; Ret	ITA; 9	CAT; 3	NED; 8	GER; 6	INP; 13	CZE; 3	GBR; 3	RSM; 4	ARA; Ret	MAL; 3	AUS; 2	JPN; 3	VAL; 7			6th	155
2014	Moto2	Suter	QAT; 3	AME; 6	ARG; 19	SPA; 10	FRA; 8	ITA; Ret	CAT; 5	NED; 6	GER; 9	INP; Ret	CZE; 4	GBR; 5	RSM; 5	ARA; 4	JPN; 1	AUS; 2	MAL; 8	VAL; 1		4th	194
2015	Moto2	Kalex	QAT; 3	AME; 12	ARG; 6	SPA; 4	FRA; 1	ITA; Ret	CAT; 6	NED; 5	GER; 6	INP; 6	CZE; 7	GBR; 9	RSM; 10	ARA; 5	JPN; Ret	AUS; 15	**MAL**; 2	VAL; 3		5th	179
2016	Moto2	Kalex	QAT; 1	ARG; 7	AME; 7	SPA; 6	**FRA**; 3	ITA; 4	CAT; 5	**NED**; Ret	GER; Ret	AUT; 4	CZE; DNS	GBR; 1	RSM; 6	ARA; 4	JPN; 1	**AUS**; 1	MAL; 6	VAL; 2		2nd	234
2017	Moto2	Kalex	QAT; 2	ARG; 3	AME; 2	SPA; 8	**FRA**; 3	ITA; 2	CAT; 2	NED; 2	GER; Ret	CZE; 1	AUT; 3	GBR; 4	RSM; 1	ARA; 4	JPN; 11	AUS; 10	MAL; DNS	VAL		2nd	243
2018	MotoGP	Honda	QAT; 16	ARG; 17	AME; 18	SPA; Ret	FRA; 16	ITA; Ret	CAT; Ret	NED; 20	GER; 17	CZE; 16	AUT; 22	GBR; C	RSM; 22	ARA; 17	THA; 20	JPN; 20	AUS; 16	MAL; 16	VAL; Ret	29th	0
2019	Moto2	Kalex	QAT; 2	ARG; Ret	AME; 1	SPA; 4	FRA; 6	ITA; 3	CAT; 2	NED; 4	GER; 5	CZE; Ret	AUT; 6	GBR; 8	RSM; 4	ARA; 6	THA; 7	JPN; 2	AUS; 3	MAL; 3	VAL; 2	3rd	250
2020	Moto2	Kalex	QAT; 10	SPA; Ret	ANC; 7	CZE; 17	AUT; 7	STY; 5	RSM; 6	EMI; 9	CAT; 11	FRA; 5	ARA; 12	TER; Ret	EUR; 19	VAL; 16	POR; 16					11th	72
2021	Moto2	Kalex	QAT; 15	DOH; Ret	POR; 17	SPA; 19	FRA; Ret	ITA; DNS	CAT; 15	GER; 19	NED; 14	STY; 16	AUT; 9	GBR; 11	ARA; Ret	RSM; 11	AME; Ret	EMI; 14	ALR; 19	VAL; 12		22nd	27

== Records ==
As of 10 April 2025, Thomas Lüthi holds the following records:

Moto2

- Most points scored: 1852
- Most podiums scored: 53
- Most fastest laps: 18

Awards
Preceded by Roger Federer	Swiss Sportsman of the Year; 2005	Succeeded by Roger Federer
