= Thungschneit =

Former municipality in Bern, Switzerland

- Former municipality
- Location of Thungschneit
- Location within Switzerland Location within Canton of Bern
- Coordinates: 46.79754006°N 7.58810017°E
- Country: Switzerland
- Canton: Bern
- District: Thun
- Municipality: Heimberg

Population (1860)
  - Total: 125
- Time zone: UTC+01:00 (CET)
  - Summer (DST): UTC+02:00 (CEST)
- ISO 3166 code: CH-BE
- Website

Thungschneit is a former municipality in the Thun District and the Thun administrative district of the canton of Bern, Switzerland. Since 1869 it has been part of the municipality of Heimberg.

== History ==
Thungschneit is first mentioned in 1783 as Thung'schneit. It had 108 inhabitants in 1850 and 125 in 1860. The small open-field and boatmen's village (Zelg- und Schifferdorf) lies on the right bank of the Aare, on a terrace at the Bäumberg and the Hubel. Like Heimberg, it had a boatmen's guild (Schifferzunft or Meisterschaft) in the 17th and 18th centuries.

From the 16th century Thungschneit belonged, together with Heimberg, to the parish of Steffisburg, and from 1681 also to the school community of Steffisburg. In the 19th century, higher school contributions that Thungschneit paid to Heimberg overstretched the small municipality, so that it gave up its independence in 1869. The Thungschneit part of the municipality kept its own citizens' community (Burgergemeinde) and, unlike the rest of Heimberg, remained agricultural.

== Bibliography ==
- 850 Jahre Heimberg, 1146–1996, 1995
- U. Maurer, J.-P. Anderegg, Bauinventar der Gemeinde Heimberg, 2004
