= Oppligen =

Swiss municipality in Bern-Mittelland, Bern, Switzerland

- Municipality
- Flag Coat of arms
- Location of Oppligen
- Location within Switzerland Location within Canton of Bern
- Coordinates: 46°49′N 7°36′E
- Country: Switzerland
- Canton: Bern
- District: Bern-Mittelland

Government
  - Executive: Gemeinderat with 5 members
  - Mayor: Gemeindepräsident(in); Peter Schmid (as of 2026)

Area
  - Total: 3.4 km^{2} (1.3 sq mi)
- Elevation: 560 m (1,840 ft)

Population (December 2020)
  - Total: 638
  - Density: 190/km^{2} (490/sq mi)
- Time zone: UTC+01:00 (CET)
  - Summer (DST): UTC+02:00 (CEST)
- Postal code: 3629
- SFOS number: 622
- ISO 3166 code: CH-BE
- Surrounded by: Brenzikofen, Heimberg, Herbligen, Kiesen, Wichtrach
- Website: oppligen.ch

Oppligen is a municipality in the Bern-Mittelland administrative district in the canton of Bern in Switzerland.

== History ==
Oppligen is first mentioned in 1234 as Oppelingen.

The oldest trace of a settlement is a Bronze Age earthwork on the Oppligerbergli. In addition, Roman coins and several early medieval graves indicate that the area remained inhabited. By the 13th century, Interlaken Monastery owned the village and its court. In 1336 the residents of Oppligen were listed as citizens of the monastery. In 1528, Bern adopted the Protestant Reformation and secularized the monastery and all its lands. Oppligen became part of the newly created Bernese district of Interlaken.

The chapel at Oppligerbergli was first mentioned in 1250, but was demolished during the secularization of 1528. The village was part of the parish of Oberwichtrach (now Wichtrach municipality).

The village was generally rural until the 1970s when the expanding agglomeration of Bern reached it. As of 2000 about three-quarters of the population commutes to jobs in the Bern region.

== Geography ==
Oppligen has an area of 3.4 km^{2} (1.31 sq mi). As of 2012, a total of 1.86 km^{2} (0.72 mi^{2}) or 54.5% is used for agricultural purposes, while 1.09 km^{2} (0.42 mi^{2}) or 32.0% is forested. Of the rest of the land, 0.41 km^{2} (0.16 mi^{2}) or 12.0% is settled (buildings or roads), 0.04 km^{2} (9.9 acres) or 1.2% is either rivers or lakes.

During the same year, housing and buildings made up 5.0% and transportation infrastructure made up 4.4%. Power and water infrastructure as well as other special developed areas made up 1.8% of the area Out of the forested land, 29.9% of the total land area is heavily forested and 2.1% is covered with orchards or small clusters of trees. Of the agricultural land, 39.0% is used for growing crops and 14.1% is pastures, while 1.5% is used for orchards or vine crops. All the water in the municipality is flowing water.

The municipality is located in the lower Kiesental and Rotachental (Kiesen and Rotachen Valleys) and includes the village of Oppligen and the hamlet of Rotachen.

On 31 December 2009 Amtsbezirk Konolfingen, the municipality's former district, was dissolved. On the following day, 1 January 2010, it joined the newly created Verwaltungskreis Bern-Mittelland.

== Coat of arms ==
The blazon of the municipal coat of arms is Argent a Cross Gules couped issuant from the base pattee.

== Demographics ==
Oppligen has a population (as of December 2020) of 638. As of 2010, 5.1% of the population are resident foreign nationals. Over the last 10 years (2001-2011) the population has changed at a rate of 0.5%. Migration accounted for -0.2%, while births and deaths accounted for 0.2%.

Most of the population (as of 2000) speaks German (573 or 97.1%) as their first language, French is the second most common (3 or 0.5%) and Portuguese is the third (3 or 0.5%). There is 1 person who speaks Italian.

As of 2008, the population was 49.0% male and 51.0% female. The population was made up of 307 Swiss men (46.2% of the population) and 19 (2.9%) non-Swiss men. There were 324 Swiss women (48.7%) and 15 (2.3%) non-Swiss women. Of the population in the municipality, 182 or about 30.8% were born in Oppligen and lived there in 2000. There were 300 or 50.8% who were born in the same canton, while 57 or 9.7% were born somewhere else in Switzerland, and 35 or 5.9% were born outside of Switzerland.

As of 2011, children and teenagers (0–19 years old) make up 25.4% of the population, while adults (20–64 years old) make up 58.7% and seniors (over 64 years old) make up 15.9%.

As of 2000, there were 259 people who were single and never married in the municipality. There were 275 married individuals, 29 widows or widowers and 27 individuals who are divorced.

As of 2010, there were 70 households that consist of only one person and 26 households with five or more people. In 2000, a total of 218 apartments (92.4% of the total) were permanently occupied, while 15 apartments (6.4%) were seasonally occupied and 3 apartments (1.3%) were empty. As of 2010, the construction rate of new housing units was 4.5 new units per 1000 residents.

The historical population is given in the following chart:

== Politics ==
In the 2011 federal election the most popular party was the Swiss People's Party (SVP) which received 36.5% of the vote. The next three most popular parties were the Conservative Democratic Party (BDP) (16.7%), the Social Democratic Party (SP) (13.4%) and the Green Party (10.4%). In the federal election, a total of 236 votes were cast, and the voter turnout was 49.5%.

== Economy ==
As of 2011, Oppligen had an unemployment rate of 0.98%. As of 2008, there were a total of 162 people employed in the municipality. Of these, there were 58 people employed in the primary economic sector and about 11 businesses involved in this sector. 61 people were employed in the secondary sector and there were 4 businesses in this sector. 43 people were employed in the tertiary sector, with 14 businesses in this sector. There were 300 residents of the municipality who were employed in some capacity, of which females made up 41.7% of the workforce.

In 2008 there were a total of 118 full-time equivalent jobs. The number of jobs in the primary sector was 30, all of which were in agriculture. The number of jobs in the secondary sector was 56 of which 7 or (12.5%) were in manufacturing, 48 or (85.7%) were in mining and 1 was in construction. The number of jobs in the tertiary sector was 32. In the tertiary sector; 11 or 34.4% were in wholesale or retail sales or the repair of motor vehicles, 8 or 25.0% were in a hotel or restaurant, 2 or 6.3% were technical professionals or scientists and 5 or 15.6% were in education.

In 2000, there were 69 workers who commuted into the municipality and 228 workers who commuted away. The municipality is a net exporter of workers, with about 3.3 workers leaving the municipality for every one entering. Of the working population, 18.3% used public transportation to get to work, and 56.3% used a private car.

== Religion ==
From the 2000 census, 494 or 83.7% belonged to the Swiss Reformed Church, while 33 or 5.6% were Roman Catholic. Of the rest of the population, there was 1 member of an Orthodox church, and there were 40 individuals (or about 6.78% of the population) who belonged to another Christian church. There was 1 individual who was Islamic. There were 2 individuals who were Buddhist, 2 individuals who were Hindu and 1 individual who belonged to another church. 27 (or about 4.58% of the population) belonged to no church, are agnostic or atheist, and 9 individuals (or about 1.53% of the population) did not answer the question.

== Education ==
In Oppligen about 249 or (42.2%) of the population have completed non-mandatory upper secondary education, and 71 or (12.0%) have completed additional higher education (either university or a Fachhochschule). Of the 71 who completed tertiary schooling, 74.6% were Swiss men, 19.7% were Swiss women.

The Canton of Bern school system provides one year of non-obligatory Kindergarten, followed by six years of Primary school. This is followed by three years of obligatory lower Secondary school where the students are separated according to ability and aptitude. Following the lower Secondary students may attend additional schooling or they may enter an apprenticeship.

During the 2010–11 school year, there were a total of 60 students attending classes in Oppligen. There was one kindergarten class with a total of 9 students in the municipality. Of the kindergarten students, 22.2% were permanent or temporary residents of Switzerland (not citizens) and 22.2% have a different mother language than the classroom language. The municipality had 3 primary classes and 51 students. Of the primary students, 2.0% were permanent or temporary residents of Switzerland (not citizens) and 5.9% have a different mother language than the classroom language.

As of 2000, there were 34 students from Oppligen who attended schools outside the municipality.
