= Fahrni =

- Municipality
- Flag Coat of arms
- Location of Fahrni
- Location within Switzerland Location within Canton of Bern
- Coordinates: 46°47′N 7°40′E
- Country: Switzerland
- Canton: Bern
- District: Thun

Area
  - Total: 6.68 km^{2} (2.58 sq mi)
- Elevation: 849 m (2,785 ft)

Population (Dec 2012)
  - Total: 796
  - Density: 119/km^{2} (309/sq mi)
- Time zone: UTC+01:00 (CET)
  - Summer (DST): UTC+02:00 (CEST)
- Postal code: 3617
- SFOS number: 925
- ISO 3166 code: CH-BE
- Surrounded by: Bleiken bei Oberdiessbach, Brenzikofen, Buchholterberg, Heimberg, Homberg, Steffisburg, Unterlangenegg
- Website: www.gemeinde-fahrni.ch

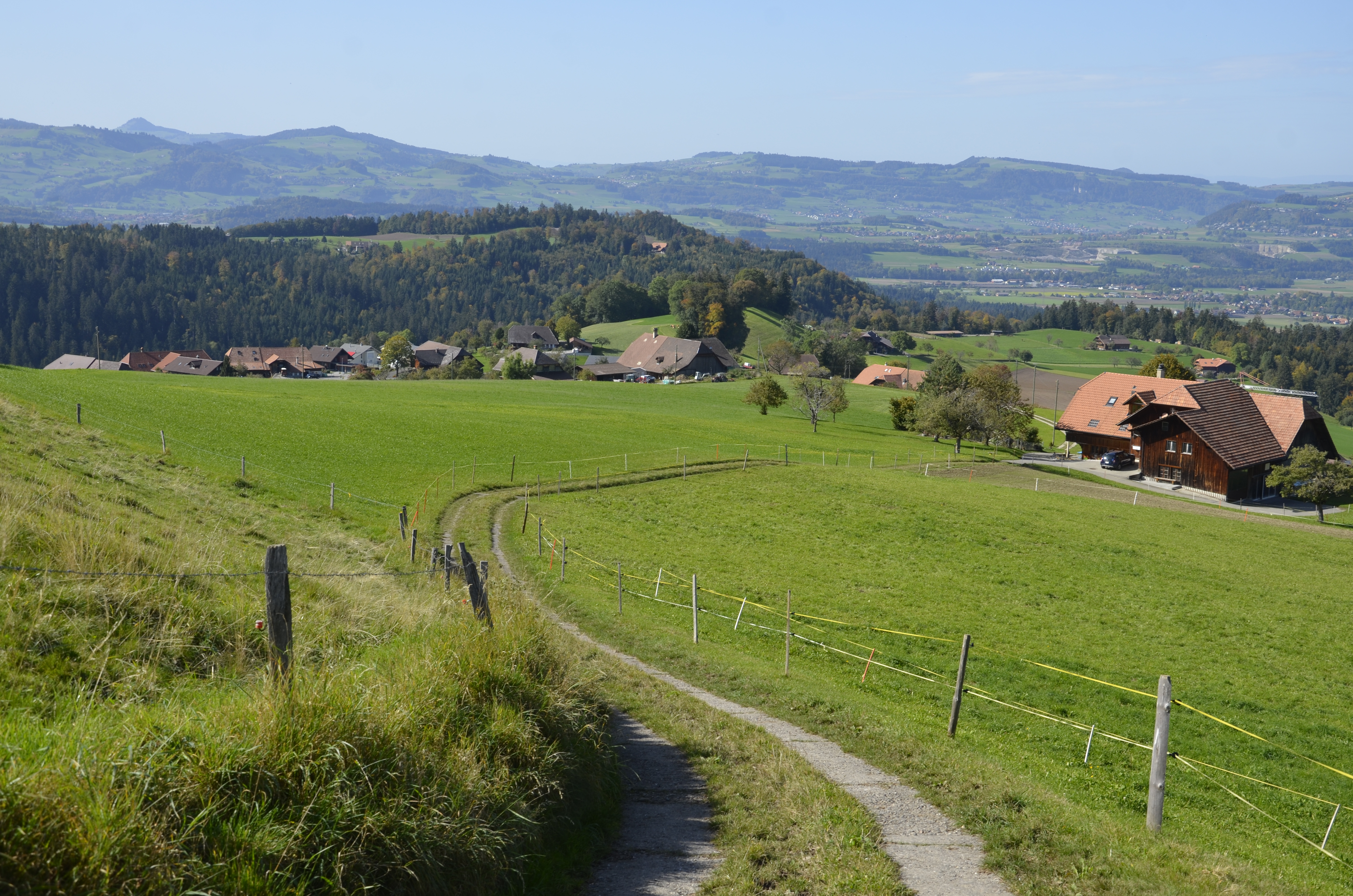
Lueg in the municipality of Fahrni

Fahrni is a municipality in the administrative district of Thun in the canton of Bern in Switzerland.

== History ==
Fahrni is first mentioned in 1299 as Varne.

The scattered villages that make up Fahrni were originally part of the Kyburg Herrschaft of Heimberg. In 1384 they were forced to sell most of their lands, including Fahrni, to the city of Bern. Under Bernese rule it became part of the court of Steffisburg in the Thun District.

Fahrni has always been part of the parish of Steffisburg, though a filial church was built in 1951 in Rachholtern.

The local economy has always been dependent on dairy farming and raising cattle. In 1975 the Schwarzenegg-Thun road opened and connected Fahrni to nearby cities. Today about half of the workforce commutes to jobs in those cities. The Obere Mürggen neighborhood was built to house the slowly growing population, but much of the community is unchanged.

== Geography ==
Fahrni has an area of 6.68 km^{2} (2.58 sq mi). As of 2012, a total of 4.46 km^{2} (1.72 mi^{2}) or 66.9% is used for agricultural purposes, while 1.78 km^{2} (0.69 mi^{2}) or 26.7% is forested. The rest of the municipality is 0.34 km^{2} (0.13 mi^{2}) or 5.1% is settled (buildings or roads), 0.08 km^{2} (20 acres) or 1.2% is either rivers or lakes and 0.01 km^{2} (2.5 acres) or 0.1% is unproductive land.

During the same year, housing and buildings made up 3.4% and transportation infrastructure made up 1.3%. All of the forested land area is covered with heavy forests. Of the agricultural land, 23.4% is used for growing crops and 40.8% is pasturage, while 2.7% is used for orchards or vine crops. All the water in the municipality is flowing water.

The municipality is located in the hills between the Zulg river and Rotachental. It includes the village known as Dörfli and the hamlets of Rachholtern, Lueg, Äschlisbühl, Bach and Embergboden as well as scattered individual farm houses.

On 31 December 2009 Amtsbezirk Thun, the municipality's former district, was dissolved. On the following day, 1 January 2010, it joined the newly created Verwaltungskreis Thun.

== Coat of arms ==
The blazon of the municipal coat of arms is Gules on a Bend Argent a Fern Leaf Vert. The coat of arms of Fahrni is partly an example of canting arms with the fern leaf (German: Farnblatt).

== Demographics ==
Fahrni has a population (as of December 2020) of 811. As of 2012, 2.1% of the population are resident foreign nationals. Between the last 2 years (2010-2012) the population changed at a rate of 7.4%. Migration accounted for 7.6%, while births and deaths accounted for 0.5%.

Most of the population (as of 2000) speaks German (698 or 97.6%) as their first language, Albanian is the second most common (10 or 1.4%) and Italian is the third (3 or 0.4%). There are 2 people who speak French.

As of 2008, the population was 50.1% male and 49.9% female. The population was made up of 368 Swiss men (49.7% of the population) and 3 (0.4%) non-Swiss men. There were 362 Swiss women (48.9%) and 8 (1.1%) non-Swiss women. Of the population in the municipality, 319 or about 44.6% were born in Fahrni and lived there in 2000. There were 300 or 42.0% who were born in the same canton, while 60 or 8.4% were born somewhere else in Switzerland, and 18 or 2.5% were born outside of Switzerland.

As of 2012, children and teenagers (0–19 years old) make up 23.2% of the population, while adults (20–64 years old) make up 58.5% and seniors (over 64 years old) make up 18.2%.

As of 2000, there were 312 people who were single and never married in the municipality. There were 335 married individuals, 49 widows or widowers and 19 individuals who are divorced.

As of 2010, there were 71 households that consist of only one person and 20 households with five or more people. In 2000, a total of 255 apartments (93.4% of the total) were permanently occupied, while 11 apartments (4.0%) were seasonally occupied and 7 apartments (2.6%) were empty. As of 2012, the construction rate of new housing units was 17.6 new units per 1000 residents. The vacancy rate for the municipality, in 2013, was 0.8%. In 2012, single family homes made up 31.2% of the total housing in the municipality.

The historical population is given in the following chart:

== Economy ==
As of 2011, Fahrni had an unemployment rate of 1.04%. As of 2011, there were a total of 201 people employed in the municipality. Of these, there were 116 people employed in the primary economic sector and about 42 businesses involved in this sector. 25 people were employed in the secondary sector and there were 10 businesses in this sector. 60 people were employed in the tertiary sector, with 27 businesses in this sector. There were 368 residents of the municipality who were employed in some capacity, of which females made up 42.9% of the workforce.

In 2008 there were a total of 117 full-time equivalent jobs. The number of jobs in the primary sector was 72, all of which were in agriculture. The number of jobs in the secondary sector was 16 of which 8 or (50.0%) were in manufacturing and 9 (56.3%) were in construction. The number of jobs in the tertiary sector was 29. In the tertiary sector; 5 or 17.2% were in wholesale or retail sales or the repair of motor vehicles, 2 or 6.9% were in the movement and storage of goods, 6 or 20.7% were the insurance or financial industry, 7 or 24.1% were in education.

In 2000, there were 25 workers who commuted into the municipality and 246 workers who commuted away. The municipality is a net exporter of workers, with about 9.8 workers leaving the municipality for every one entering. A total of 122 workers (83.0% of the 147 total workers in the municipality) both lived and worked in Fahrni. Of the working population, 7.3% used public transportation to get to work, and 61.4% used a private car.

The local and cantonal tax rate in Fahrni is one of the lowest in the canton. In 2012 the average local and cantonal tax rate on a married resident, with two children, of Fahrni making 150,000 CHF was 12.3%, while an unmarried resident's rate was 18.5%. For comparison, the average rate for the entire canton in 2011, was 14.2% and 22.0%, while the nationwide average was 12.3% and 21.1% respectively.

In 2010 there were a total of 309 tax payers in the municipality. Of that total, 86 made over 75,000 CHF per year. There were 2 people who made between 15,000 and 20,000 per year. The greatest number of workers, 100, made between 50,000 and 75,000 CHF per year. The average income of the over 75,000 CHF group in Fahrni was 107,586 CHF, while the average across all of Switzerland was 131,244 CHF.

In 2011 a total of 1.8% of the population received direct financial assistance from the government.

== Politics ==
In the 2011 federal election the most popular party was the Swiss People's Party (SVP) which received 52.1% of the vote. The next three most popular parties were the Conservative Democratic Party (BDP) (14.1%), the Social Democratic Party (SP) (11.0%) and the Green Party (4.5%). In the federal election, a total of 343 votes were cast, and the voter turnout was 58.2%.

== Religion ==
From the 2000 census, 586 or 82.0% belonged to the Swiss Reformed Church, while 30 or 4.2% were Roman Catholic. Of the rest of the population, there was 1 member of an Orthodox church, and there were 31 individuals (or about 4.34% of the population) who belonged to another Christian church. There were 13 (or about 1.82% of the population) who were Muslim. There was 1 person who was Hindu and 1 individual who belonged to another church. 35 (or about 4.90% of the population) belonged to no church, are agnostic or atheist, and 17 individuals (or about 2.38% of the population) did not answer the question.

== Education ==
In Fahrni about 60.2% of the population have completed non-mandatory upper secondary education, and 12.7% have completed additional higher education (either university or a Fachhochschule). Of the 54 who had completed some form of tertiary schooling listed in the census, 70.4% were Swiss men, 18.5% were Swiss women and 9.3% were non-Swiss women.

The Canton of Bern school system provides one year of non-obligatory Kindergarten, followed by six years of Primary school. This is followed by three years of obligatory lower Secondary school where the students are separated according to ability and aptitude. Following the lower Secondary students may attend additional schooling or they may enter an apprenticeship.

During the 2012-13 school year, there were a total of 65 students attending classes in Fahrni. There were 19 students in the German language kindergarten class and 46 primary students.

As of 2000, there were a total of 78 students attending any school in the municipality. Of those, 71 both lived and attended school in the municipality, while 7 students came from another municipality. During the same year, 30 residents attended schools outside the municipality.
