= Oberdiessbach =

- Municipality
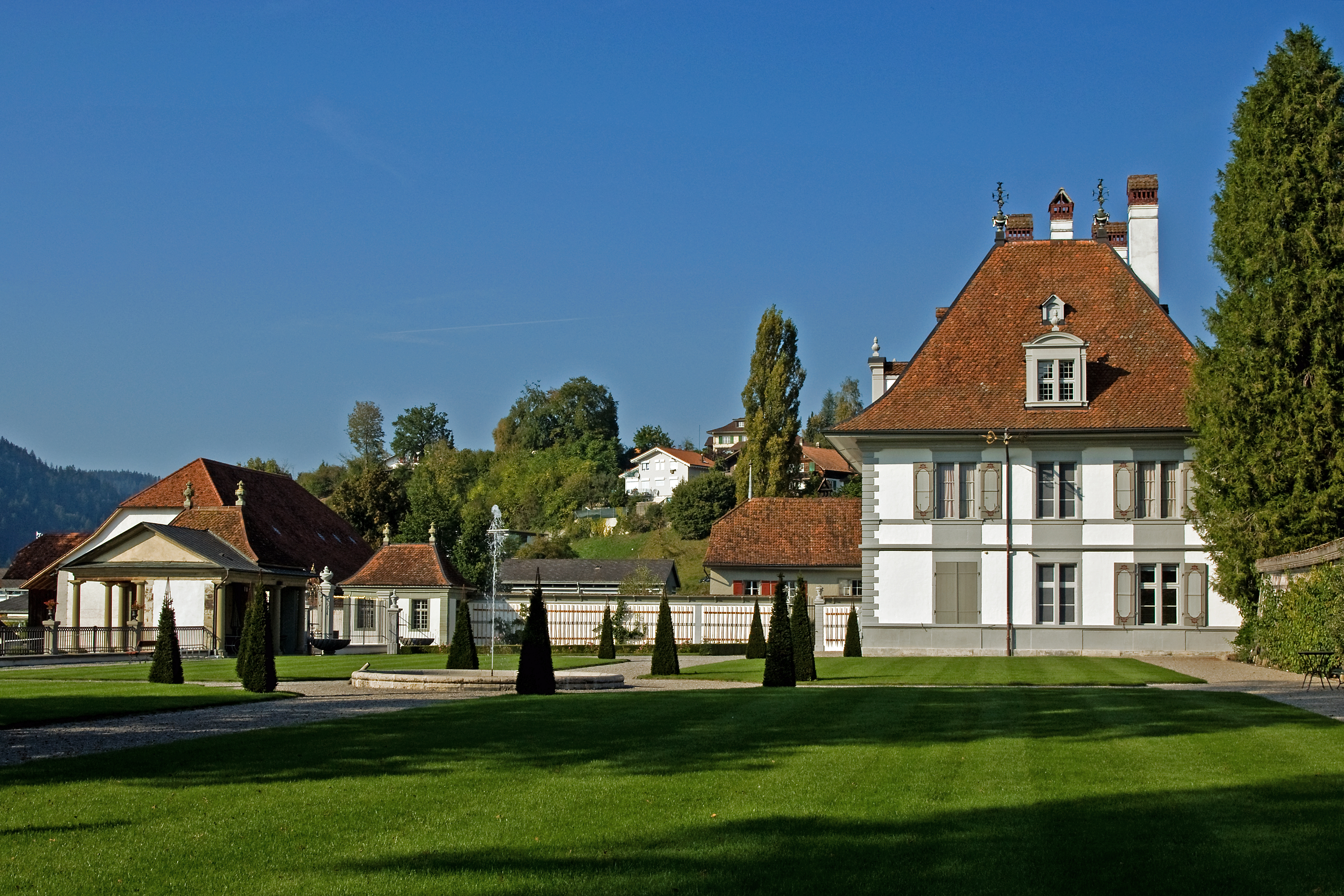

- Flag Coat of arms
- Location of Oberdiessbach
- Location within Switzerland Location within Canton of Bern
- Coordinates: 46°50′N 7°37′E
- Country: Switzerland
- Canton: Bern
- District: Bern-Mittelland

Government
  - Executive: Gemeinderat with 7 members
  - Mayor: Gemeindepräsident(in); Bettina Gerber SVP/UDC (as of 2026)

Area
  - Total: 8.2 km^{2} (3.2 sq mi)
- Elevation: 605 m (1,985 ft)

Population (December 2020)
  - Total: 3,552
  - Density: 430/km^{2} (1,100/sq mi)
- Time zone: UTC+01:00 (CET)
  - Summer (DST): UTC+02:00 (CEST)
- Postal code: 3672
- SFOS number: 619
- ISO 3166 code: CH-BE
- Surrounded by: Bleiken bei Oberdiessbach, Freimettigen, Häutligen, Herbligen, Linden, Wichtrach
- Twin towns: Féchy (Switzerland), Kardašova Řečice (Czech Republic)
- Website: www.oberdiessbach.ch

Oberdiessbach is a municipality in the Bern-Mittelland administrative district in the canton of Bern in Switzerland. On 1 January 2010 the former municipality of Aeschlen and on 1 January 2014, Bleiken bei Oberdiessbach merged into the municipality of Oberdiessbach.

== History ==
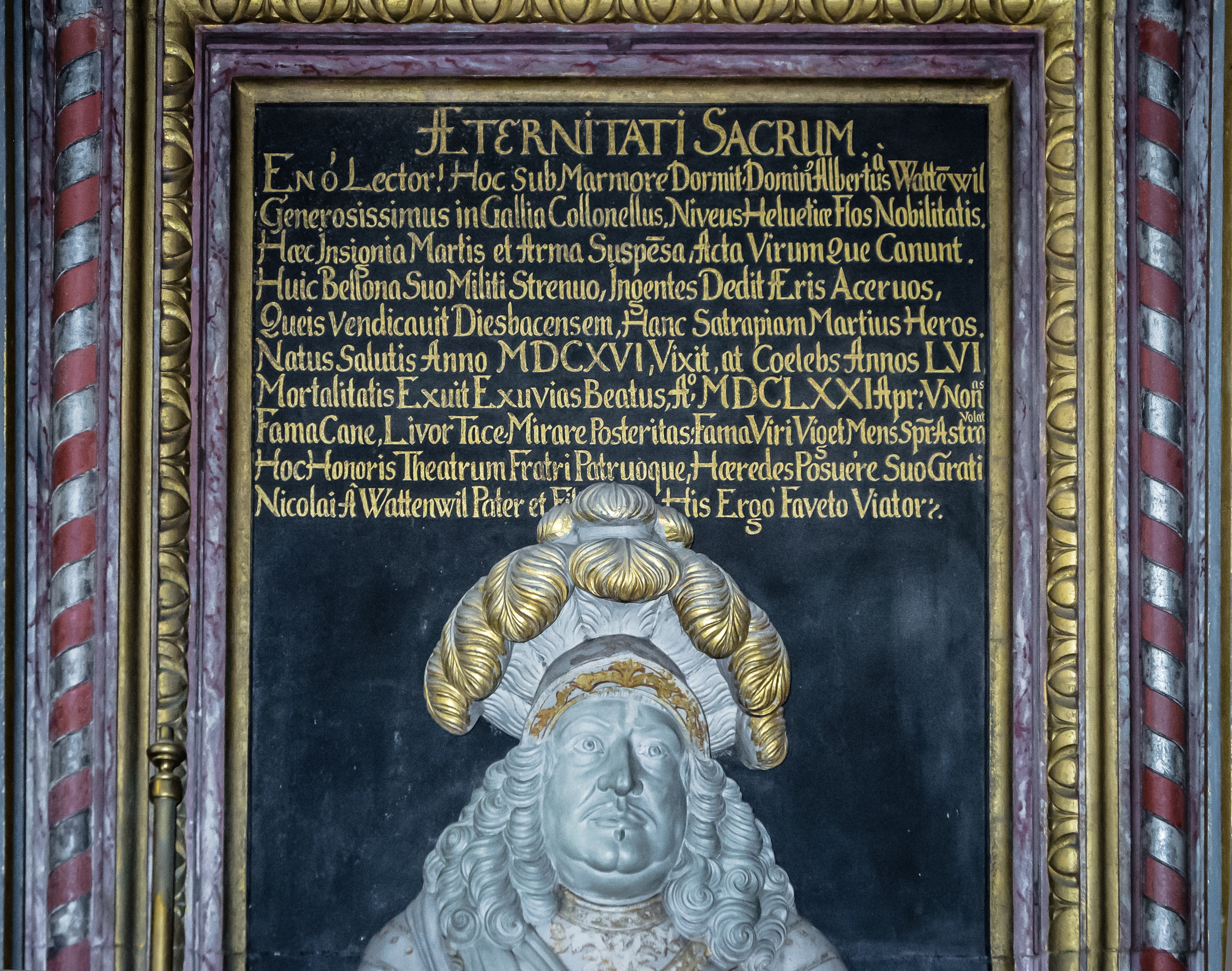
Inscription on an altar in the von Wattenwyl family chapel

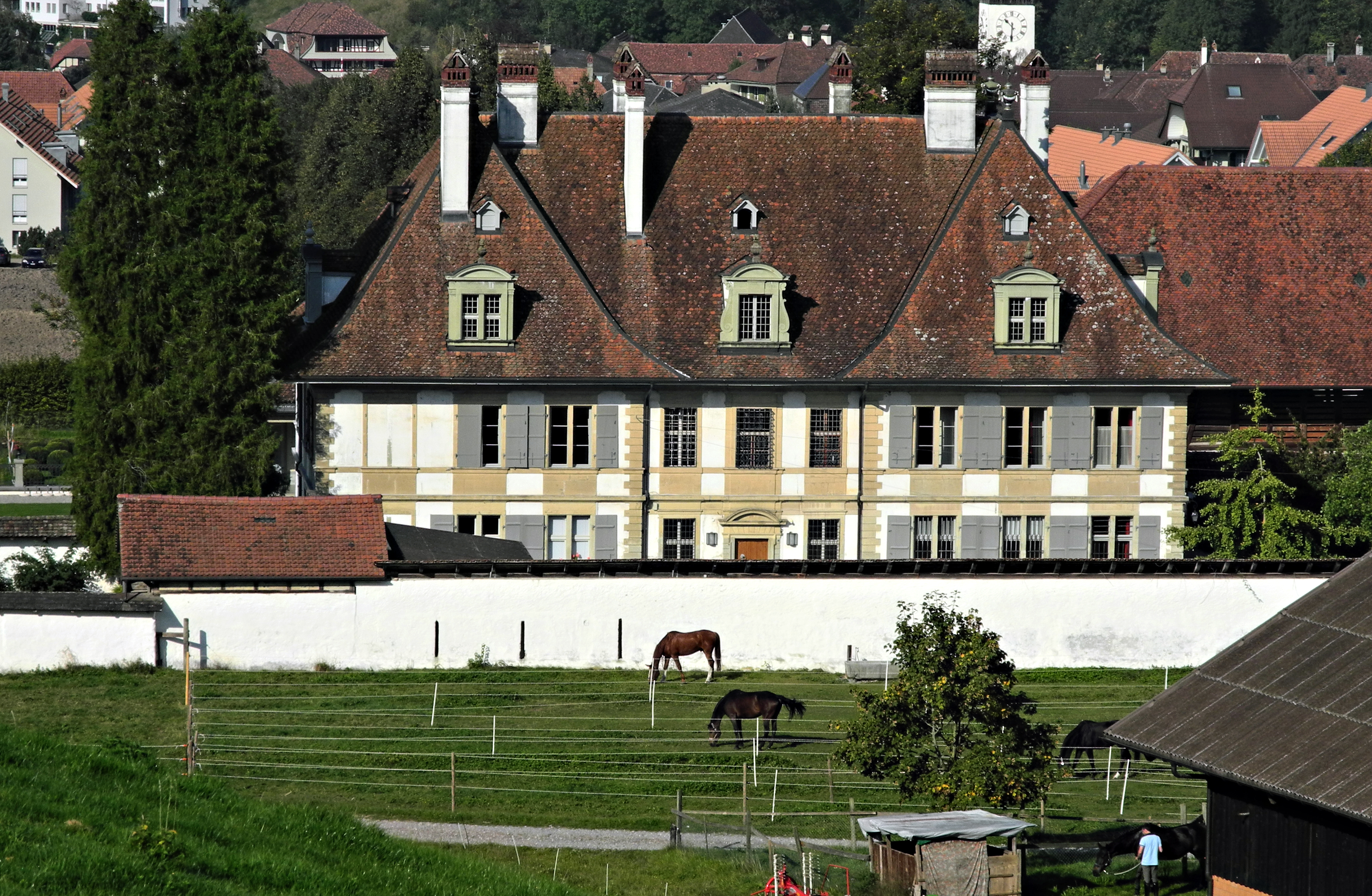
Oberdiessbach Castle

Aerial view from 400 m by Walter Mittelholzer (1927)

Oberdiessbach is first mentioned in 1218 as Tiecebac. Until 1870 it was known as Diessbach.

Oberdiessbach, at that time known as Diessbach, was the center of the late medieval Herrschaft of Diessbach. In 1218 it first appears in a record when Hartmann IV of Kyburg inherited the court of Diessbach from the Zähringens. The village, the Herrschaft and the Castle Diessenberg on the Falkenfluh remained with the Kyburg family until they were given as a fief to the Ministerialis (unfree knights in the service of a feudal overlord) family of Senn von Münsingen. In 1331 the city of Bern attacked and destroyed the castle while expanding their power into the region. The Senn family remained in power over the valley for over forty years after the destruction of the castle. Beginning in 1378 the Herrschaft passed through several wealthy families until 1647 when the von Wattenwyl family acquired Diessbach. The high court in the Herrschaft was fully independent until 1471, when Bern forced it to acknowledge Bern's supremacy. A castle was built in valley in 1560 to rule over the Herrschaft. This castle was replaced in 1668 by a new castle (known as the Neues Schloss or Oberdiessbach Castle) under the direction of Albrecht von Wattenwyl. The von Wattenwyl family remained in the town over the following centuries. Around 1728 the country estate Diessenhof was built for a cadet branch of the family.

The town church was first mentioned in 1266. The current building dates from 1498. In the late 17th century the von Wattenwyl family built a private chapel in the church.

As the center of a Herrschaft, the village developed early into a town and a regional center. The first school in the parish opened in Diessbach in the 17th century. This was followed by a secondary school in 1856 and then by a trade school in 1895. A hospital opened in 1880 which eventually grew into the district hospital. By the 18th century there were seven mills, three horseshoe forges, seven nail forges, a sawmill, a tannery, a saddlery and a grocer in the town. The rulers of the town attempted to open a silk spinning factory and a glass factory during the 18th century, though these were not successful. The town began to industrialize after 1899, when the Burgdorf-Thun Railway built a station in the town. The population slowly increased and in the 1970s several new housing developments were built. By 2005, over half of all employees in Oberdiessbach worked in the manufacturing sector.

=== Bleiken bei Oberdiessbach ===
Bleiken bei Oberdiessbach is first mentioned in 1337 as Bleikon. In 1473 it was mentioned simply as villages (Dörfer).

The village was settled rather later than many of the nearby villages. In 1880 a medical spa resort was built in the village. The spa eventually closed and the building is now an apartment complex. Even after the spa was built, the village remained isolated. In 1908 a Postauto route was established which connected Bleiken with Oberdiessbach. Today, over half of the working population commutes to jobs in Oberdiessbach and nearly three-quarters of the jobs in the village are in agriculture or small business.

== Geography ==
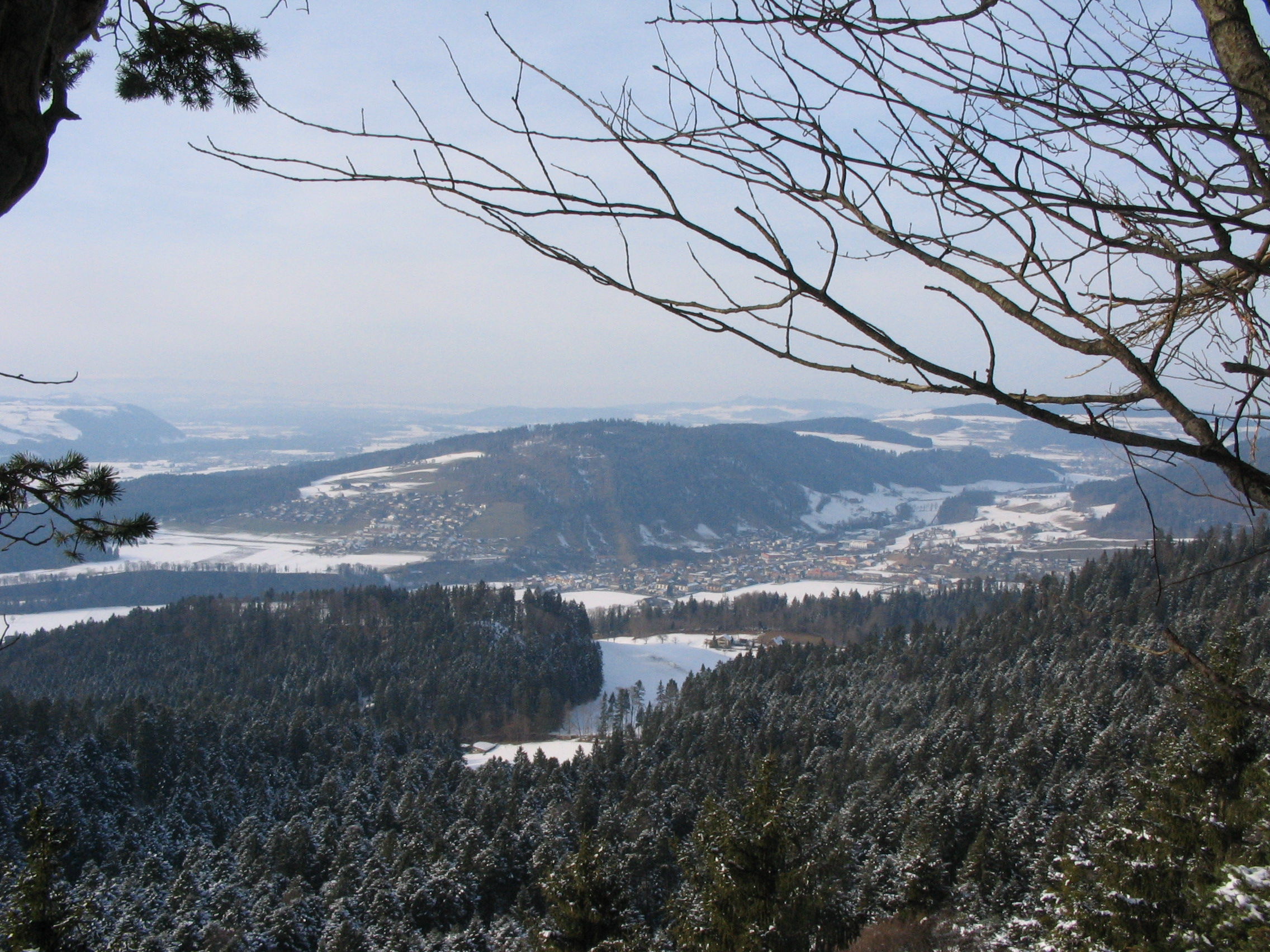
Oberdiessbach town viewed from the Falkenfluh

Oberdiessbach has an area of 16.47 km^{2} (6.36 sq mi). As of 2012, a total of 6.66 km^{2} (2.57 mi^{2}) or 51.1% is used for agricultural purposes, while 5.12 km^{2} (1.98 mi^{2}) or 39.3% is forested. Of the rest of the land, 1.29 km^{2} (0.50 mi^{2}) or 9.9% is settled (buildings or roads), 0.01 km^{2} (2.5 acres) or 0.1% is either rivers or lakes and 0.02 km^{2} (4.9 acres) or 0.2% is unproductive land.

During the same year, industrial buildings made up 1.2% of the total area while housing and buildings made up 4.6% and transportation infrastructure made up 3.2%. Out of the forested land, 38.0% of the total land area is heavily forested and 1.3% is covered with orchards or small clusters of trees. Of the agricultural land, 16.9% is used for growing crops and 27.5% is pastures, while 1.9% is used for orchards or vine crops and 4.7% is used for alpine pastures. All the water in the municipality is flowing water.

The municipality is located in the Kiesental (Kiesen Valley) between Kurzenberg, Falkenfluh and Hube. It includes the village of Oberdiessbach and the communities of Glasholz and Hauben. Since January 2010 it has included Aeschlen and since 2014, Bleiken bei Oberdiessbach.

== Coat of arms ==
The blazon of the municipal coat of arms is Sable a Bendlet dancety Or between two Lions passant of the same langued and viriled Gules.

== Demographics ==
Oberdiessbach has a population (as of December 2020) of 3,552. As of 2010, 5.7% of the population are resident foreign nationals. Over the last 10 years (2001-2011) the population has changed at a rate of -0.4%. Migration accounted for -1.8%, while births and deaths accounted for 0.1%.

Most of the population (as of 2000) speaks German (2,777 or 95.2%) as their first language, Serbo-Croatian is the second most common (29 or 1.0%) and French is the third (26 or 0.9%). There are 16 people who speak Italian.

As of 2008, the population was 50.0% male and 50.0% female. The population was made up of 1,460 Swiss men (46.9% of the population) and 96 (3.1%) non-Swiss men. There were 1,477 Swiss women (47.4%) and 82 (2.6%) non-Swiss women. Of the population in the municipality, 796 or about 27.3% were born in Oberdiessbach and lived there in 2000. There were 1,424 or 48.8% who were born in the same canton, while 332 or 11.4% were born somewhere else in Switzerland, and 245 or 8.4% were born outside of Switzerland.

As of 2011, children and teenagers (0–19 years old) make up 24% of the population, while adults (20–64 years old) make up 59.8% and seniors (over 64 years old) make up 16.3%.

As of 2000, there were 1,219 people who were single and never married in the municipality. There were 1,394 married individuals, 181 widows or widowers and 122 individuals who are divorced.

As of 2000, there were 271 households that consist of only one person and 94 households with five or more people. In 2000, a total of 1,046 apartments (92.9% of the total) were permanently occupied, while 43 apartments (3.8%) were seasonally occupied and 37 apartments (3.3%) were empty. As of 2010, the construction rate of new housing units was 1.6 new units per 1000 residents. The vacancy rate for the municipality, in 2011, was 1.44%.

== Historic population ==
The historical population is given in the following chart:

== Heritage sites of national significance ==
The Chapel of the von Wattenwyl family, the Landsitz (country estate) Diessenhof, Oberdiessbach Castle and since the 2014 merger, the Statthalterhof in Bleiken, are listed as Swiss heritage site of national significance. The entire urbanized village of Oberdiessbach is part of the Inventory of Swiss Heritage Sites.

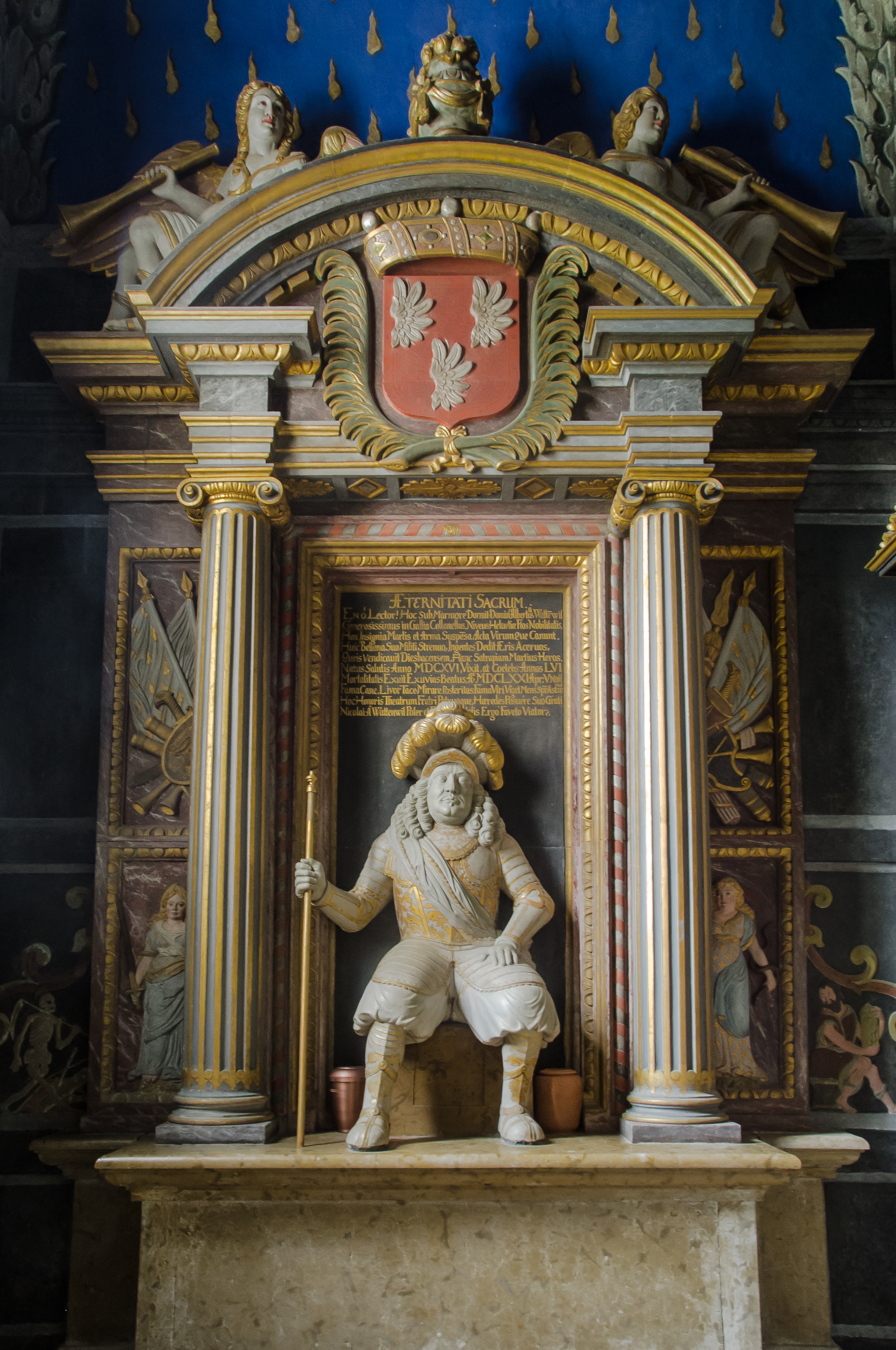
Altar of the von Wattenwyl family chapel

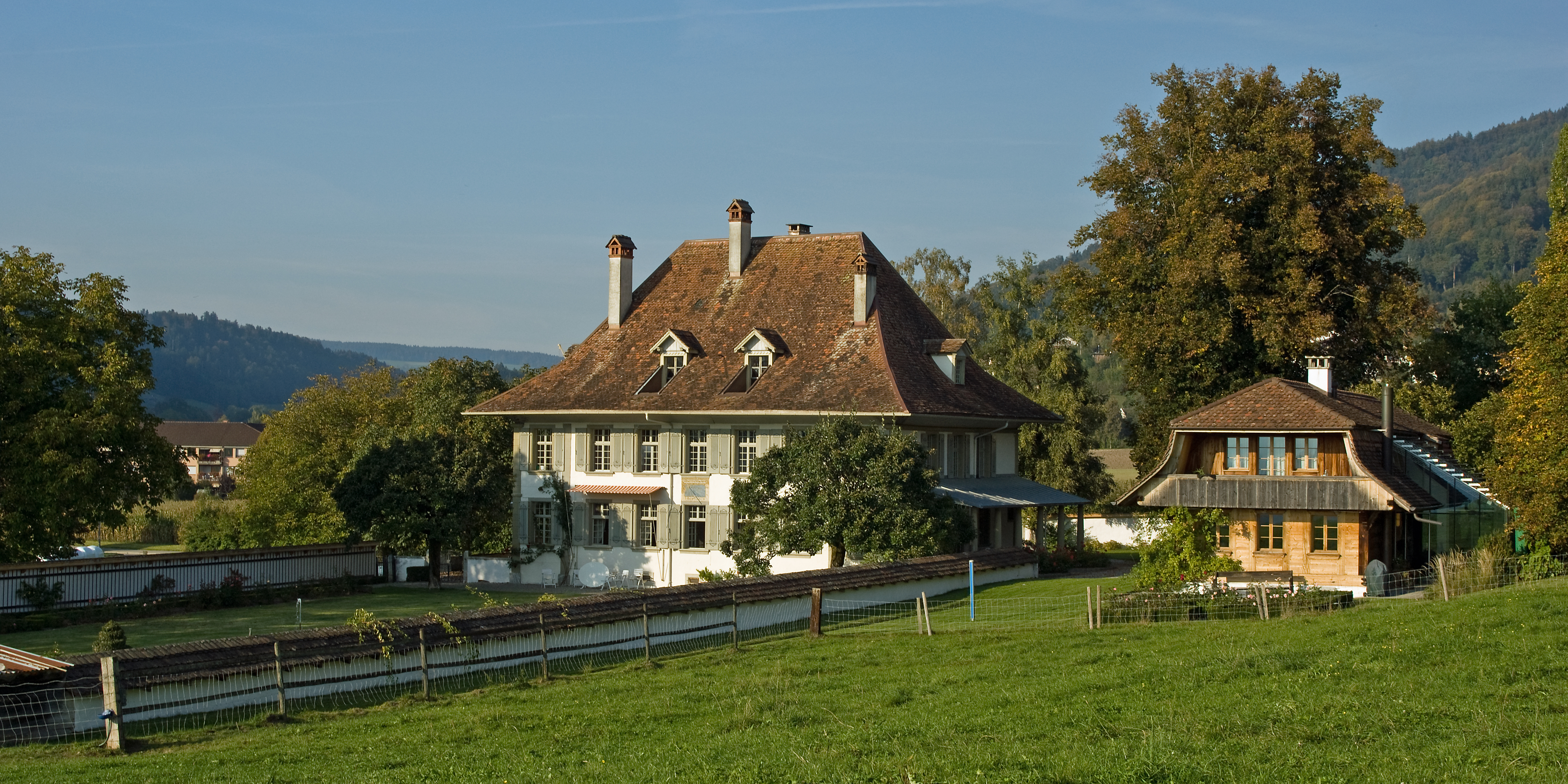
Country estate of Diessenhof

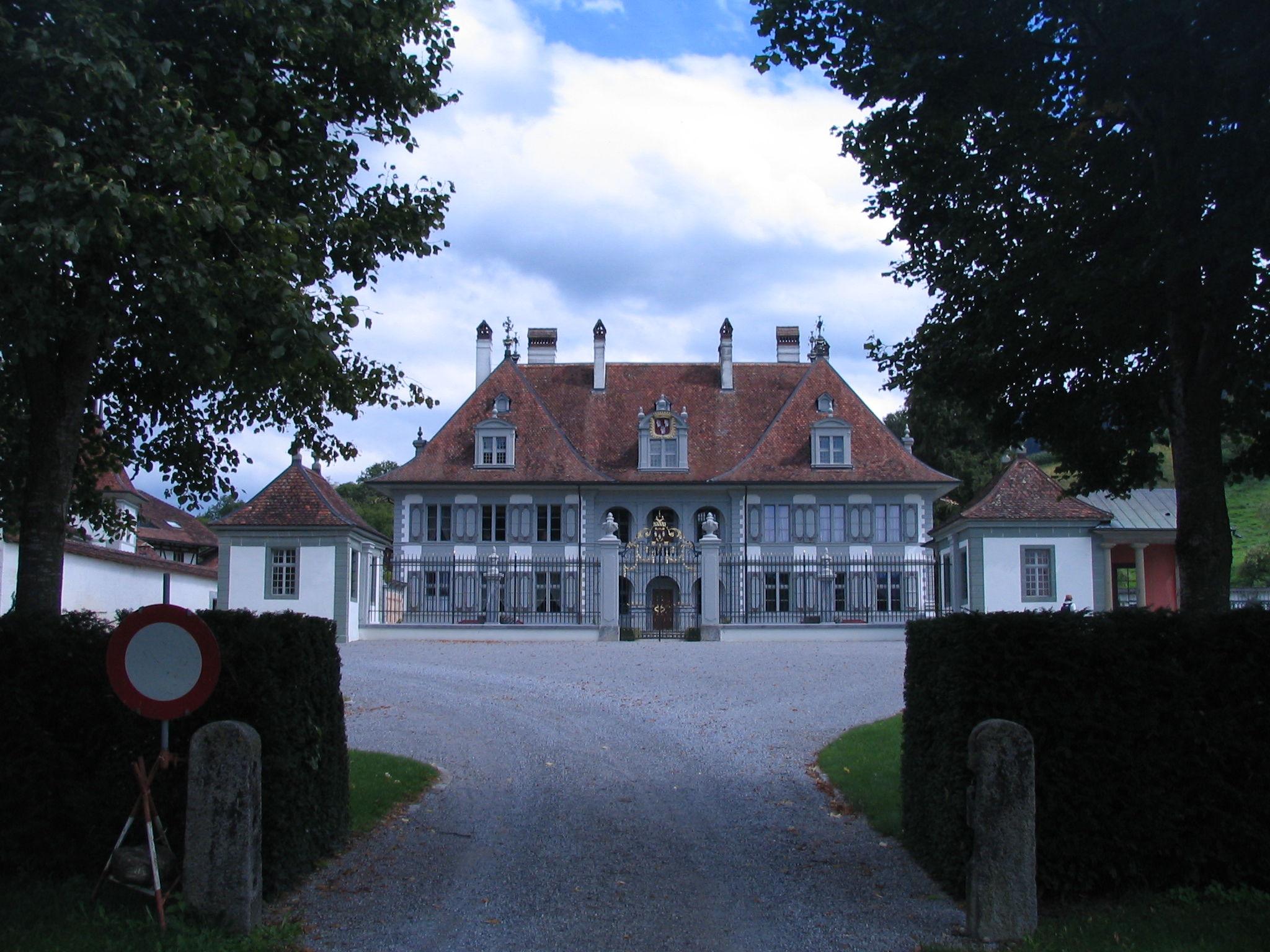
Oberdiessbach Castle

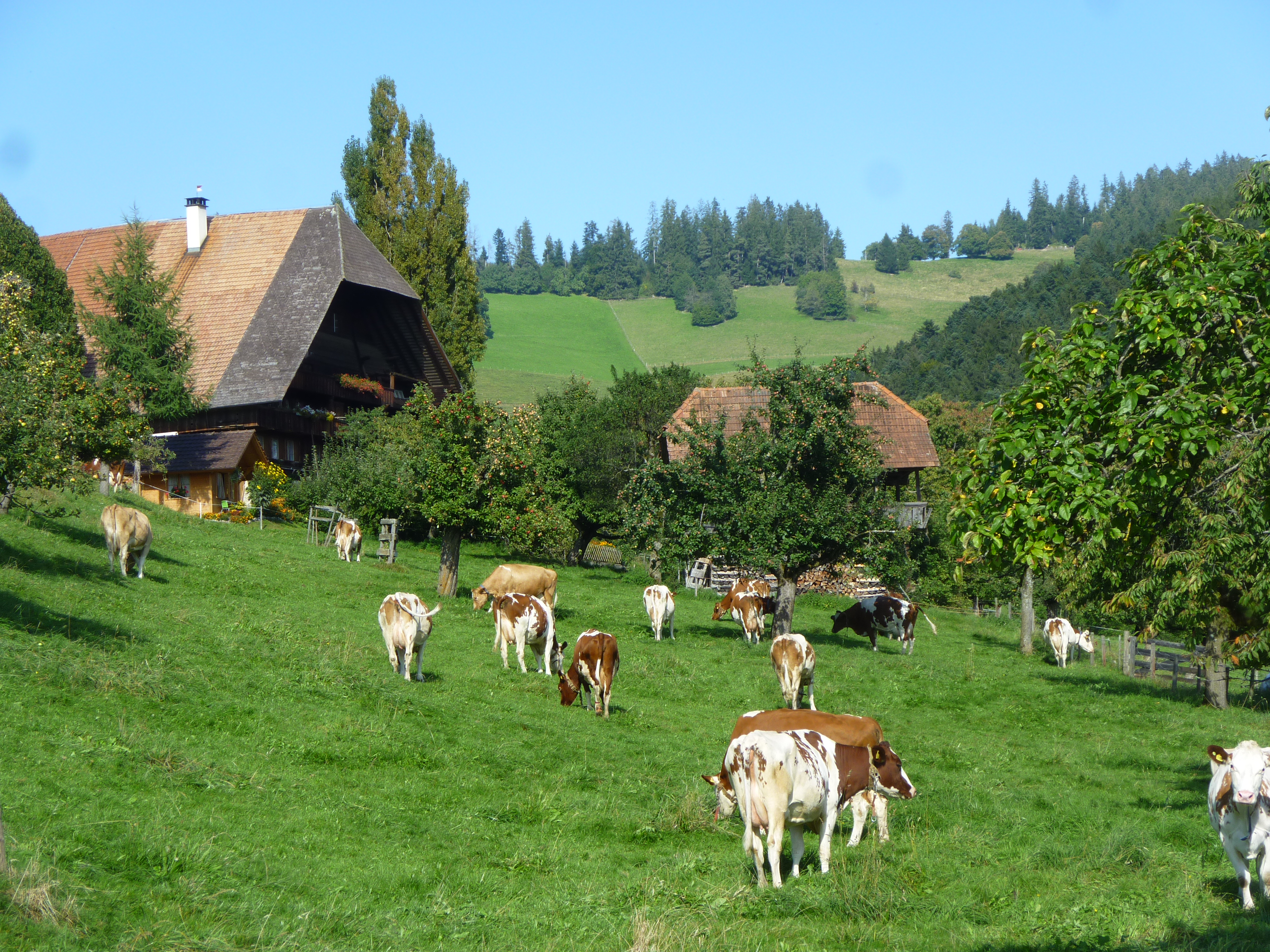
The Statthalterhof with its fields and cattle

== Politics ==
In the 2011 federal election the most popular party was the Swiss People's Party (SVP) which received 33% of the vote. The next three most popular parties were the Social Democratic Party (SP) (14%), the Conservative Democratic Party (BDP) (12.4%) and the FDP.The Liberals (11.3%). In the federal election, a total of 1,253 votes were cast, and the voter turnout was 53.8%.

== Economy ==
As of 2011, Oberdiessbach had an unemployment rate of 0.98%. As of 2008, there were a total of 1,738 people employed in the municipality. Of these, there were 151 people employed in the primary economic sector and about 48 businesses involved in this sector. 848 people were employed in the secondary sector and there were 45 businesses in this sector. 739 people were employed in the tertiary sector, with 101 businesses in this sector. There were 1,493 residents of the municipality who were employed in some capacity, of which females made up 41.2% of the workforce.

In 2008 there were a total of 1,364 full-time equivalent jobs. The number of jobs in the primary sector was 55, of which 51 were in agriculture and 4 were in forestry or lumber production. The number of jobs in the secondary sector was 791 of which 684 or (86.5%) were in manufacturing and 108 (13.7%) were in construction. The number of jobs in the tertiary sector was 518. In the tertiary sector; 158 or 30.5% were in wholesale or retail sales or the repair of motor vehicles, 19 or 3.7% were in the movement and storage of goods, 20 or 3.9% were in a hotel or restaurant, 12 or 2.3% were the insurance or financial industry, 25 or 4.8% were technical professionals or scientists, 49 or 9.5% were in education and 182 or 35.1% were in health care.

In 2000, there were 989 workers who commuted into the municipality and 897 workers who commuted away. The municipality is a net importer of workers, with about 1.1 workers entering the municipality for every one leaving. Of the working population, 18.1% used public transportation to get to work, and 47.6% used a private car.

== Religion ==
From the 2000 census, 2,215 or 76.0% belonged to the Swiss Reformed Church, while 176 or 6.0% were Roman Catholic. Of the rest of the population, there were 30 members of an Orthodox church (or about 1.03% of the population), there was 1 individual who belongs to the Christian Catholic Church, and there were 287 individuals (or about 9.84% of the population) who belonged to another Christian church. There was 1 individual who was Jewish, and 57 (or about 1.95% of the population) who were Islamic. There were 4 individuals who were Buddhist and 22 individuals who were Hindu. 160 (or about 5.49% of the population) belonged to no church, are agnostic or atheist, and 105 individuals (or about 3.60% of the population) did not answer the question.

== Education ==
In Oberdiessbach about 1,138 or (39.0%) of the population have completed non-mandatory upper secondary education, and 352 or (12.1%) have completed additional higher education (either university or a Fachhochschule). Of the 352 who completed tertiary schooling, 70.5% were Swiss men, 23.6% were Swiss women, 4.0% were non-Swiss men and 2.0% were non-Swiss women.

The Canton of Bern school system provides one year of non-obligatory Kindergarten, followed by six years of Primary school. This is followed by three years of obligatory lower Secondary school where the students are separated according to ability and aptitude. Following the lower Secondary students may attend additional schooling or they may enter an apprenticeship.

During the 2010-11 school year, there were a total of 469 students attending classes in Oberdiessbach. There were 2 kindergarten classes with a total of 34 students in the municipality. Of the kindergarten students, 8.8% were permanent or temporary residents of Switzerland (not citizens) and 32.4% have a different mother language than the classroom language. The municipality had 12 primary classes and 232 students. Of the primary students, 3.0% were permanent or temporary residents of Switzerland (not citizens) and 5.6% have a different mother language than the classroom language. During the same year, there were 10 lower secondary classes with a total of 203 students. There were 2.0% who were permanent or temporary residents of Switzerland (not citizens) and 4.4% have a different mother language than the classroom language.

As of 2000, there were 188 students in Oberdiessbach who came from another municipality, while 85 residents attended schools outside the municipality.

Oberdiessbach is home to the Mediothek Oberdiessbach library. The library has (as of 2008) 9,553 books or other media, and loaned out 25,251 items in the same year. It was open a total of 175 days with average of 8 hours per week during that year.

== Transportation ==
The municipality has a railway station, Brenzikofen, on the Burgdorf–Thun line. It has regular service to Thun, Konolfingen, and Solothurn.

== Notable people ==
- Johann Hasler (1548 - after 1602) a 16th century Swiss theologian and physician. He is known for his association with a group of antitrinitarians and for developing Galen's concept of heat and cold into the idea of a scale of temperature
- Thomas Lüthi (born 6 September 1986) a professional motorcycle road racer
