= Oberdiessbach Castle =

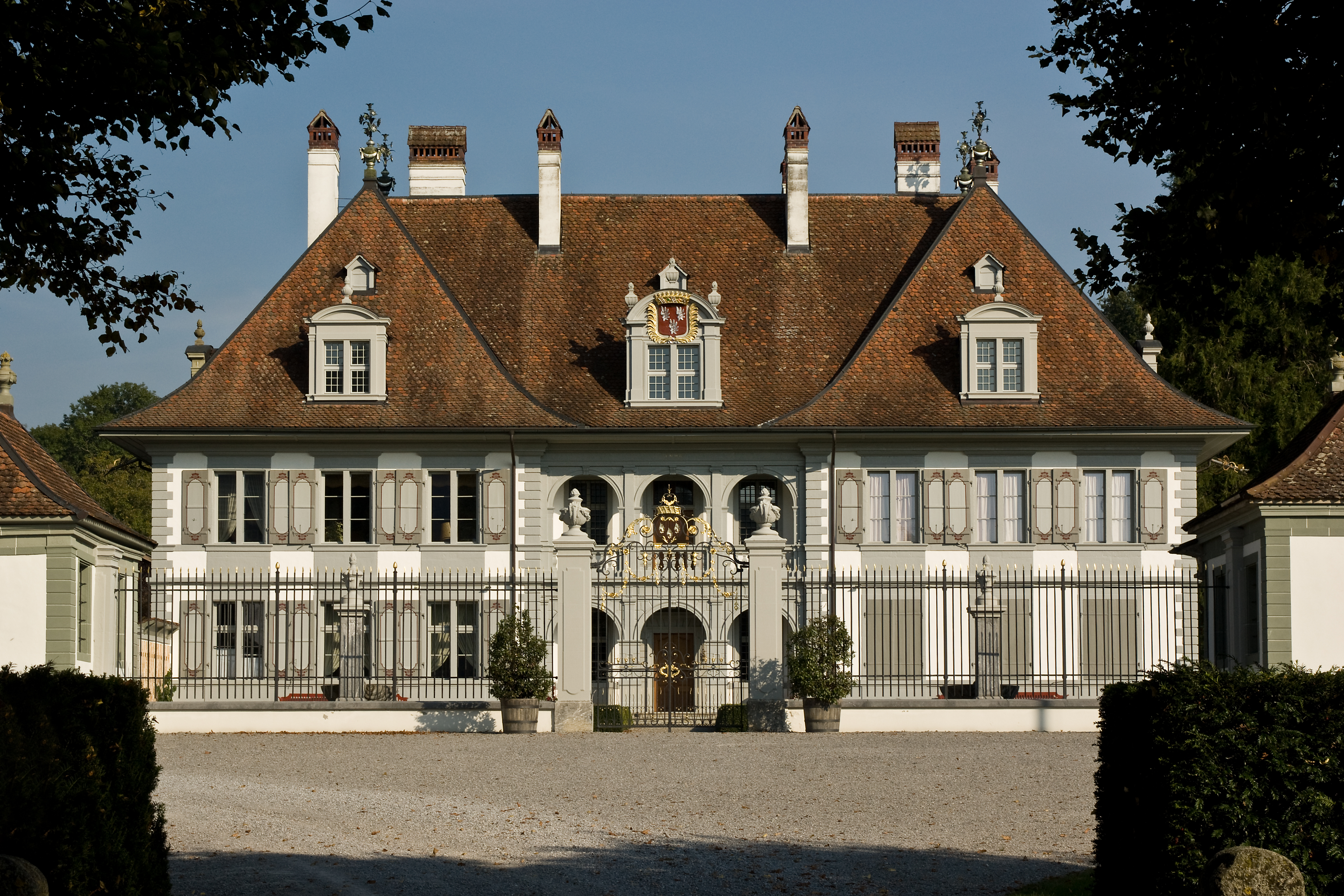
- Oberdiessbach Castle

- Location within Switzerland
- 46.838927°N 7.626079°E
- Location: Oberdiessbach

History
- Built: 1666-1668

Site notes
- Architect: Jonas Favre
- Governing body: von Wattenwyl family

Swiss Cultural Property of National Significance

Oberdiessbach Castle German: Schloss Oberdiessbach (also called Neues Schloss) is a castle in the municipality of Oberdiessbach of the Canton of Bern in Switzerland. It is a Swiss heritage site of national significance.

== History ==
The town of Oberdiessbach (known as Diessbach until 1870) was the center of the late medieval Herrschaft of Diessbach. The first castle in the area, Diessenberg on the Falkenfluh was built above the town and destroyed in 1331. In 1546 Niklaus von Diesbach built the Alte Schloss (Old Castle) on the valley floor near the town. In 1666, near the Old Castle, construction began on the Neue Schloss or New Castle for Albrecht von Wattenwyl (1617-1671). Albrecht von Wattenwyl had been a commander of the Swiss Guard in service to the French king. So, he had the castle built in the French late Renaissance style. It was built by Neuchâtel architect Jonas Favre. The castle exterior remained generally unchanged after initial construction finished in 1668. The only major changes occurred around 1720, when the gate house was converted into a prison and in the 1850s when the garden was redone in the English style. The garden remained an English garden until 2005 when it was converted back into a Baroque style garden.

== The castle today ==
Oberdiessbach Castle remains the home of the von Wattenwyl family. Groups may tour the castle from April until October with prior arraignments. Some rooms in the castle and the gardens can be rented for events. Every July there are several Jazz concerts in the castle gardens as part of the Castle Jazz Festival. The castle is surrounded by 75 hectares (190 acres) of working farms.

== See also ==
- List of castles in Switzerland
