= Buchegg Castle =

Castle in Switzerland

Coordinates: 47°8′29.31″N 7°30′33.85″E

Buchegg Castle is a castle in the Swiss municipality of Kyburg-Buchegg in the canton of Solothurn, Switzerland.

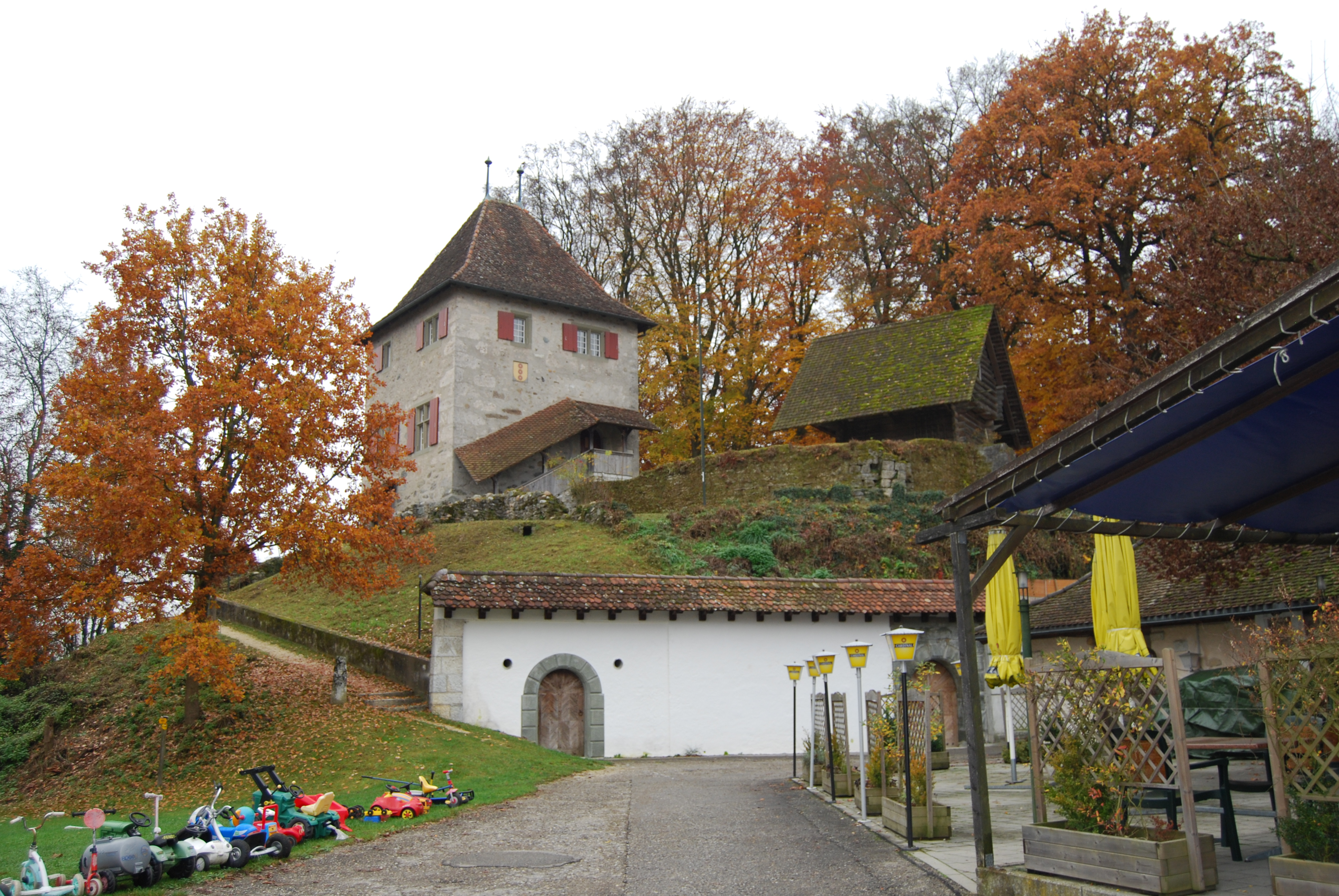
Buchegg Castle viewed from the North

The castle, built in 1546, has a square tower with a hip roof. The Counts of Buchegg had a castle on the site until 1383 when it was destroyed by the House of Kyburg. The current building saw service as a prison and came into private ownership in 1863. It was restored in 1938 and was converted to a museum in 1956.

== See also ==
- List of castles and fortresses in Switzerland
