= Kiesen railway station =

Railway station in Kiesen, Switzerland

Kiesen
- The station platforms in 2022

General information
- Location: Kiesen; Switzerland
- Coordinates: 46°49′08″N 7°34′32″E
- Elevation: 539 m (1,768 ft)
- Owner: Swiss Federal Railways
- Line: Bern–Thun line
- Platforms: 2 side platforms
- Tracks: 2
- Train operators: BLS AG

Construction
- Parking: Yes (73 spaces)
- Cycle facilities: Yes (202 spaces)
- Accessible: Yes

Other information
- Station code: 8507008 (KI)
- Fare zone: 710 (Libero)

Passengers
- 2023: 730 per weekday (BLS)

Services
Preceding station	Bern S-Bahn	Following station
Wichtrach towards Fribourg/Freiburg	S1	Uttigen towards Thun
Location

Kiesen railway station (German: Bahnhof Kiesen) is a railway station in the municipality of Kiesen, in the Swiss canton of Bern. It is an intermediate stop on the standard gauge Bern–Thun line of Swiss Federal Railways.

== Services ==
As of the December 2024 timetable change, the following services stop at Kiesen:

- Bern S-Bahn S1: half-hourly service between Fribourg/Freiburg and Thun.
