= Wichtrach railway station =

Railway station in Wichtrach, Switzerland

Wichtrach
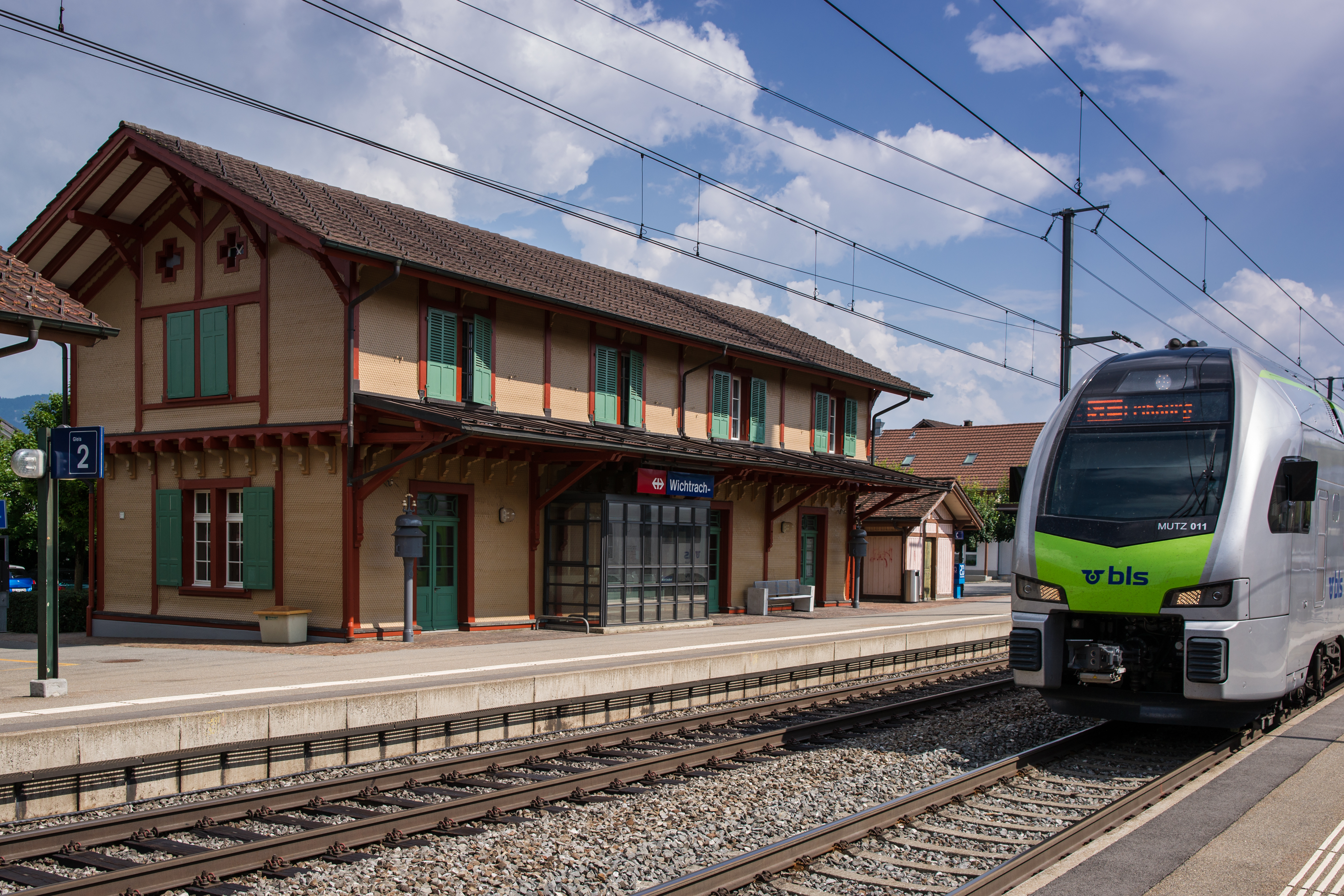
- A BLS train passes the station building in 2013

General information
- Location: Wichtrach; Switzerland
- Coordinates: 46°50′30″N 7°34′08″E
- Elevation: 530 m (1,740 ft)
- Owner: Swiss Federal Railways
- Line: Bern–Thun line
- Platforms: 2 side platforms
- Tracks: 2
- Train operators: BLS AG
- Connections: BERNMOBIL buses

Construction
- Parking: Yes (42 spaces)
- Cycle facilities: Yes (225 spaces)
- Accessible: Yes

Other information
- Station code: 8507007 (WCH)
- Fare zone: 626/710 (Libero)

Passengers
- 2023: 1'800 per weekday (BLS)

Services
Preceding station	Bern S-Bahn	Following station
Münsingen towards Fribourg/Freiburg	S1	Kiesen towards Thun
Location

Wichtrach railway station (German: Bahnhof Wichtrach) is a railway station in the municipality of Wichtrach, in the Swiss canton of Bern. It is an intermediate stop on the standard gauge Bern–Thun line of Swiss Federal Railways.

== Services ==
As of the December 2024 timetable change, the following services stop at Wichtrach:

- Bern S-Bahn S1: half-hourly service between Fribourg/Freiburg and Thun.
