= Rubigen railway station =

Railway station in Rubigen, Switzerland

Rubigen
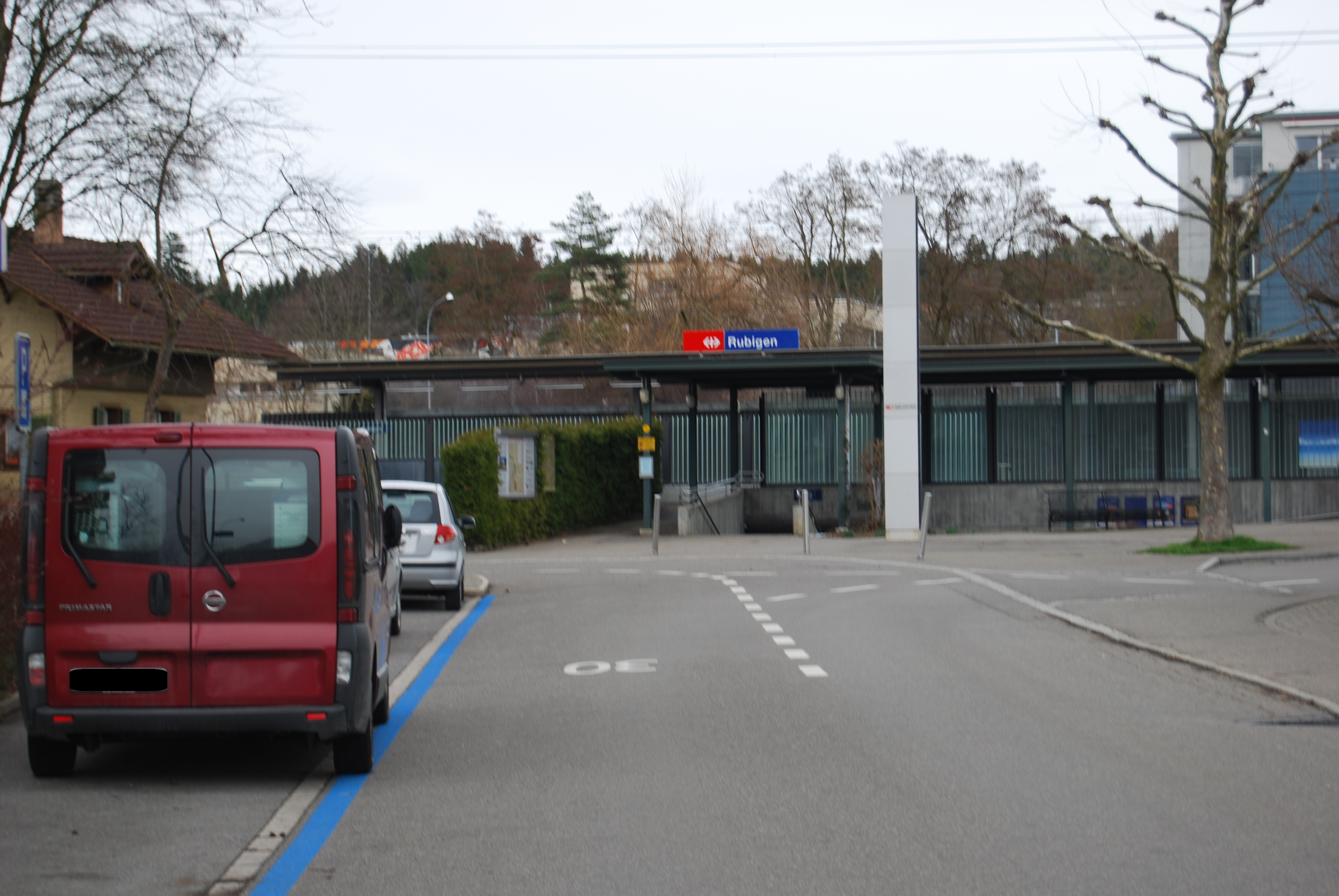
- The station in 2010

General information
- Location: Rubigen; Switzerland
- Coordinates: 46°53′57″N 7°32′43″E
- Elevation: 549 m (1,801 ft)
- Owner: Swiss Federal Railways
- Line: Bern–Thun line
- Platforms: 2 side platforms
- Tracks: 2
- Train operators: BLS AG
- Connections: BERNMOBIL buses; PostAuto Schweiz buses

Construction
- Parking: Yes (39 spaces)
- Cycle facilities: Yes (121 spaces)
- Accessible: Yes

Other information
- Station code: 8507005 (RUB)
- Fare zone: 115/126 (Libero)

Passengers
- 2023: 2'000 per weekday (BLS)

Services
Preceding station	Bern S-Bahn	Following station
Gümligen towards Fribourg/Freiburg	S1	Münsingen towards Thun
Gümligen towards Bern	S11 Rush-hour service	Münsingen One-way operation
Location

Rubigen railway station (German: Bahnhof Rubigen) is a railway station in the municipality of Rubigen, in the Swiss canton of Bern. It is an intermediate stop on the standard gauge Bern–Thun line of Swiss Federal Railways.

== Services ==
As of the December 2024 timetable change, the following services stop at Rubigen:

- Bern S-Bahn:
  - S1: half-hourly service between Fribourg/Freiburg and Thun.
  - S11: two daily rush-hour services on weekdays to Bern.
