= Schmitten FR railway station =

Railway station in Schmitten, Canton of Fribourg, Switzerland

Schmitten FR
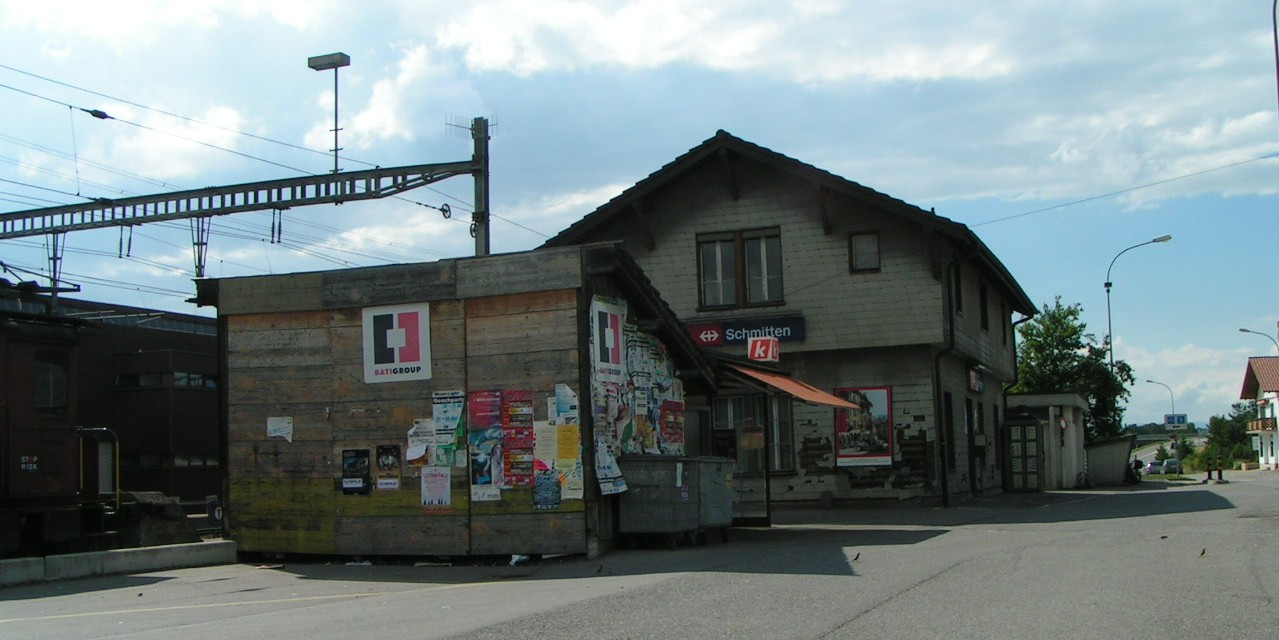
- The station building in 2005

General information
- Location: Schmitten; Switzerland
- Coordinates: 46°51′47″N 7°15′14″E
- Elevation: 606 m (1,988 ft)
- Owner: Swiss Federal Railways
- Line: Lausanne–Bern line
- Distance: 77.9 km (48.4 mi) from Lausanne
- Platforms: 2: 1 island platform; 1 side platform
- Tracks: 3
- Train operators: BLS AG
- Connections: tpf buses

Construction
- Parking: Yes (99 spaces)
- Cycle facilities: Yes (53 spaces)
- Accessible: Partly

Other information
- Station code: 8504102 (SCMI)
- Fare zone: 13 (frimobil)

Passengers
- 2023: 1'600 per weekday (BLS)

Services
Preceding station	Bern S-Bahn	Following station
Düdingen towards Fribourg/Freiburg	S1	Wünnewil towards Thun
Location

Schmitten FR railway station (German: Bahnhof Schmitten FR) is a railway station in the municipality of Schmitten, in the Swiss canton of Fribourg. It is an intermediate stop on the standard gauge Lausanne–Bern line of Swiss Federal Railways.

== Services ==
As of the December 2024 timetable change, the following services stop at Schmitten FR:

- Bern S-Bahn S1: half-hourly service between Fribourg/Freiburg and Thun.
