= Uttigen railway station =

Railway station in Uttigen, Switzerland

Uttigen
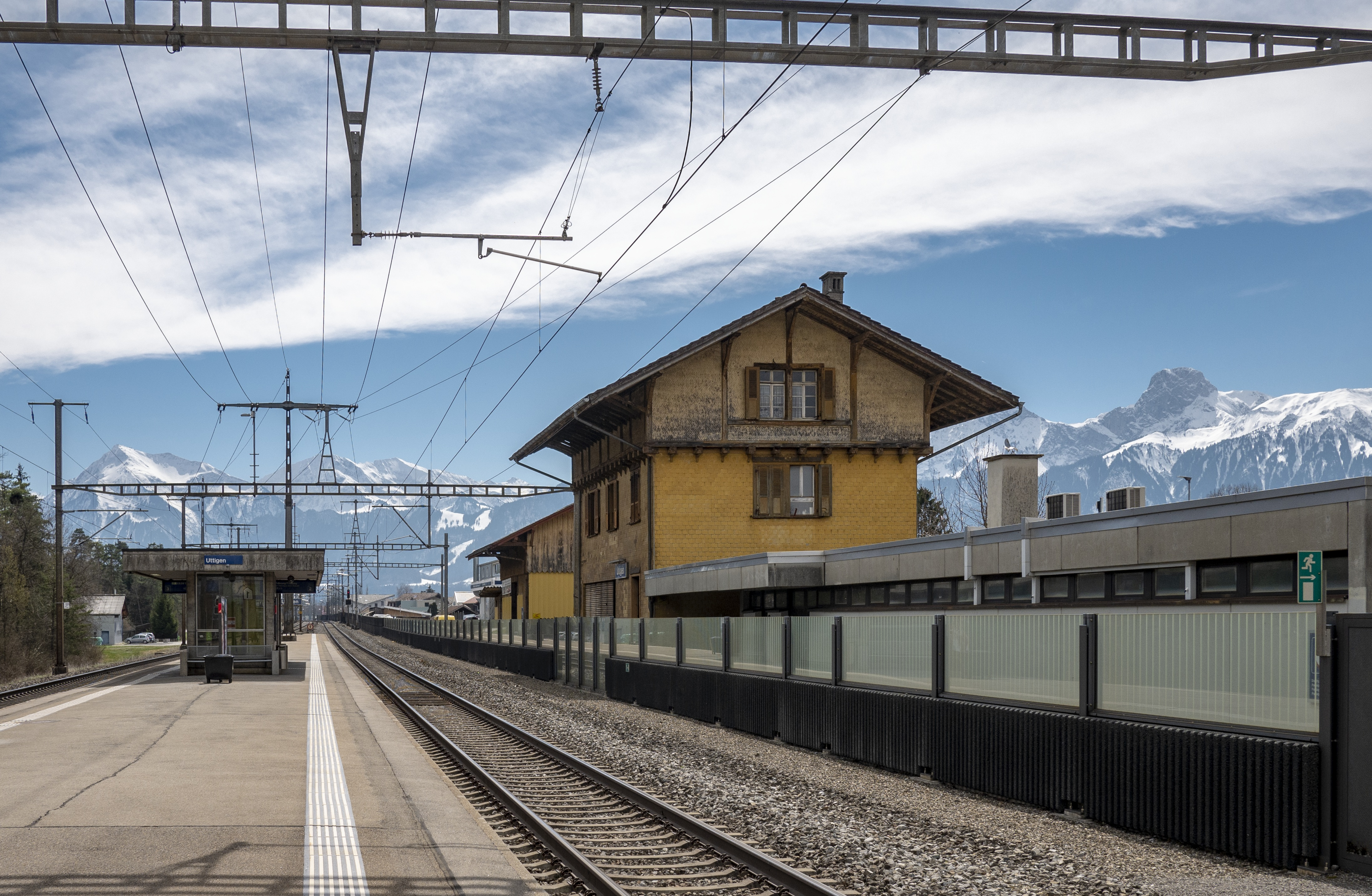
- The station platform in 2019

General information
- Location: Uttigen; Switzerland
- Coordinates: 46°47′39″N 7°34′57″E
- Elevation: 545 m (1,788 ft)
- Owner: Swiss Federal Railways
- Line: Bern–Thun line
- Platforms: 2 (1 island platform)
- Tracks: 2
- Train operators: BLS AG

Construction
- Parking: Yes (62 spaces)
- Cycle facilities: Yes (140 spaces)
- Accessible: Yes

Other information
- Station code: 8507009 (UTI)
- Fare zone: 701/710 (Libero)

Passengers
- 2023: 950 per weekday (BLS)

Services
Preceding station	Bern S-Bahn	Following station
Kiesen towards Fribourg/Freiburg	S1	Thun Terminus
Location

Uttigen railway station (German: Bahnhof Uttigen) is a railway station in the municipality of Uttigen, in the Swiss canton of Bern. It is an intermediate stop on the standard gauge Bern–Thun line of Swiss Federal Railways.

== Services ==
As of the December 2024 timetable change, the following services stop at Uttigen:

- Bern S-Bahn S1: half-hourly service between Fribourg/Freiburg and Thun.
