= Gümligen railway station =

Railway station in Muri bei Bern, Switzerland

Gümligen
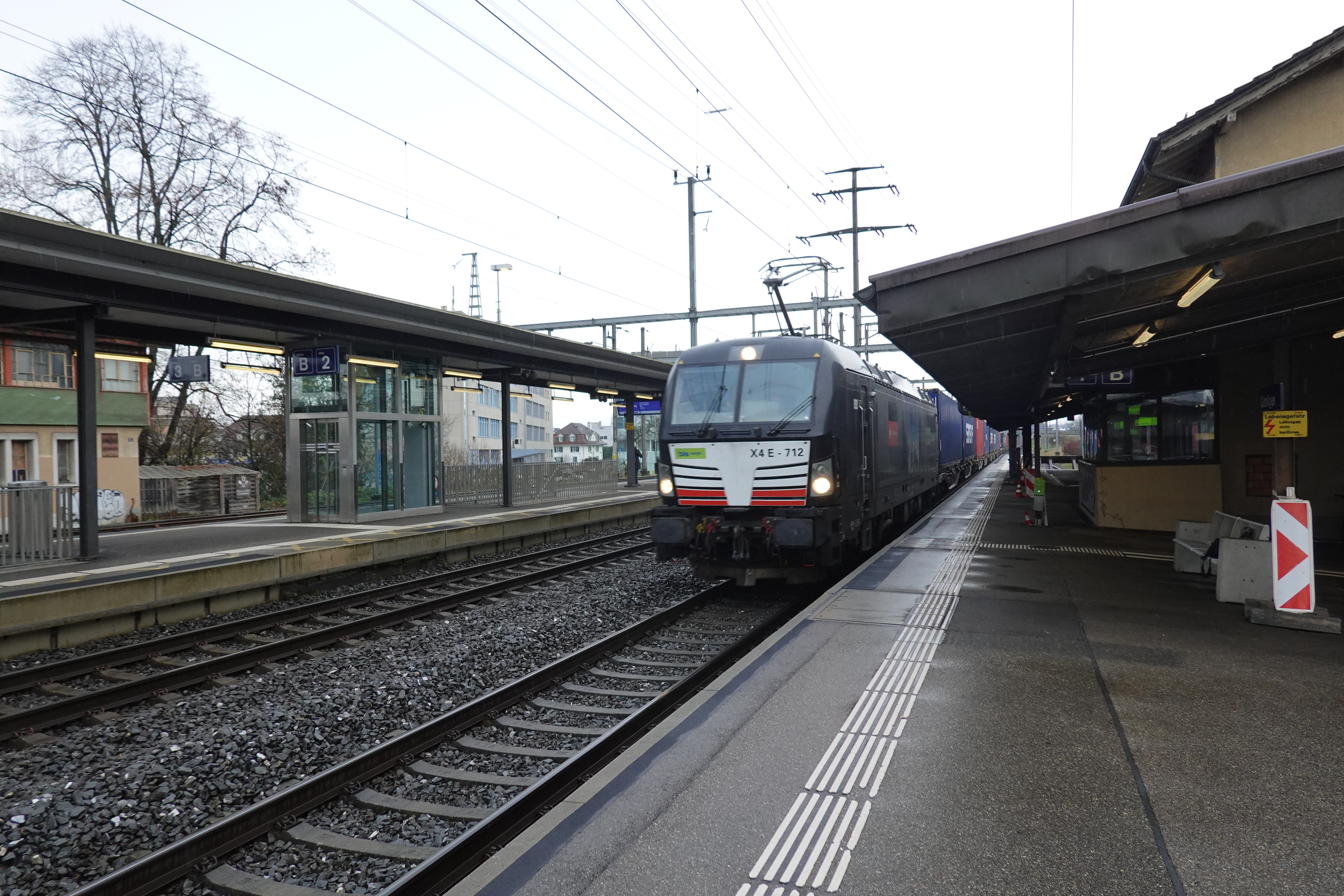
- A freight train passing the station in 2023

General information
- Location: Muri bei Bern; Switzerland
- Coordinates: 46°56′04″N 7°30′20″E
- Elevation: 562 m (1,844 ft)
- Owner: Swiss Federal Railways
- Lines: Bern–Lucerne line; Bern–Thun line
- Platforms: 3: 1 side platform; 1 island platform
- Tracks: 5
- Train operators: BLS AG
- Connections: Tram line 6; BERNMOBIL bus line; RBS buses

Construction
- Parking: Yes (23 spaces)
- Cycle facilities: Yes (164 spaces)
- Accessible: Yes

Other information
- Station code: 8507003 (GUE)
- Fare zone: 101/115 (Libero)

Passengers
- 2023: 4'800 per weekday (BLS, SBB)

Services
Preceding station	Bern S-Bahn	Following station
Ostermundigen towards Fribourg/Freiburg	S1	Rubigen towards Thun
Ostermundigen towards Bern	S11 Rush-hour service	Rubigen One-way operation
Ostermundigen towards Laupen BE	S2	Worb SBB towards Langnau i.E.
Preceding station	BLS	Following station
Zollikofen towards Biel/Bienne	RE11 Saturdays only	Münsingen towards Brig
Ostermundigen towards Biel/Bienne	RE11 Weekends only	Münsingen towards Brig
Location

Gümligen railway station (German: Bahnhof Gümligen) is a railway station in the municipality of Muri bei Bern, in the Swiss canton of Bern. It is located at the junction of the standard gauge Bern–Lucerne and Bern–Thun lines of Swiss Federal Railways.

== Services ==
As of the December 2024 timetable change, the following services stop at Gümligen:

- Bern S-Bahn:
  - S1: half-hourly service between Fribourg/Freiburg and Thun.
  - S11: two daily rush-hour services on weekdays to Bern.
  - S2: half-hourly service between Laupen BE and Langnau.
- RegioExpress : daily service on weekends during the high season between Biel/Bienne and Brig.

== Gallery ==
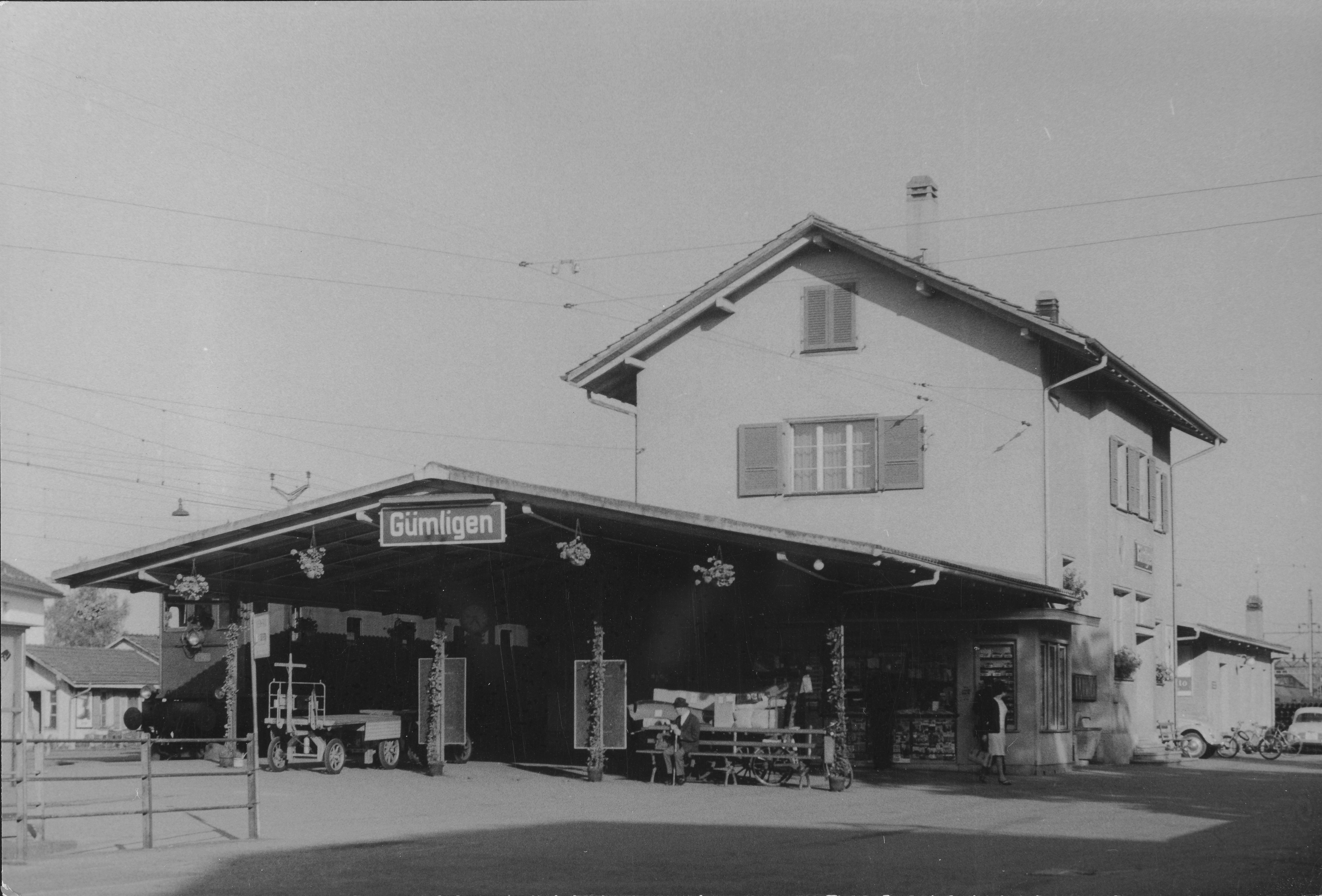
station building (1966)

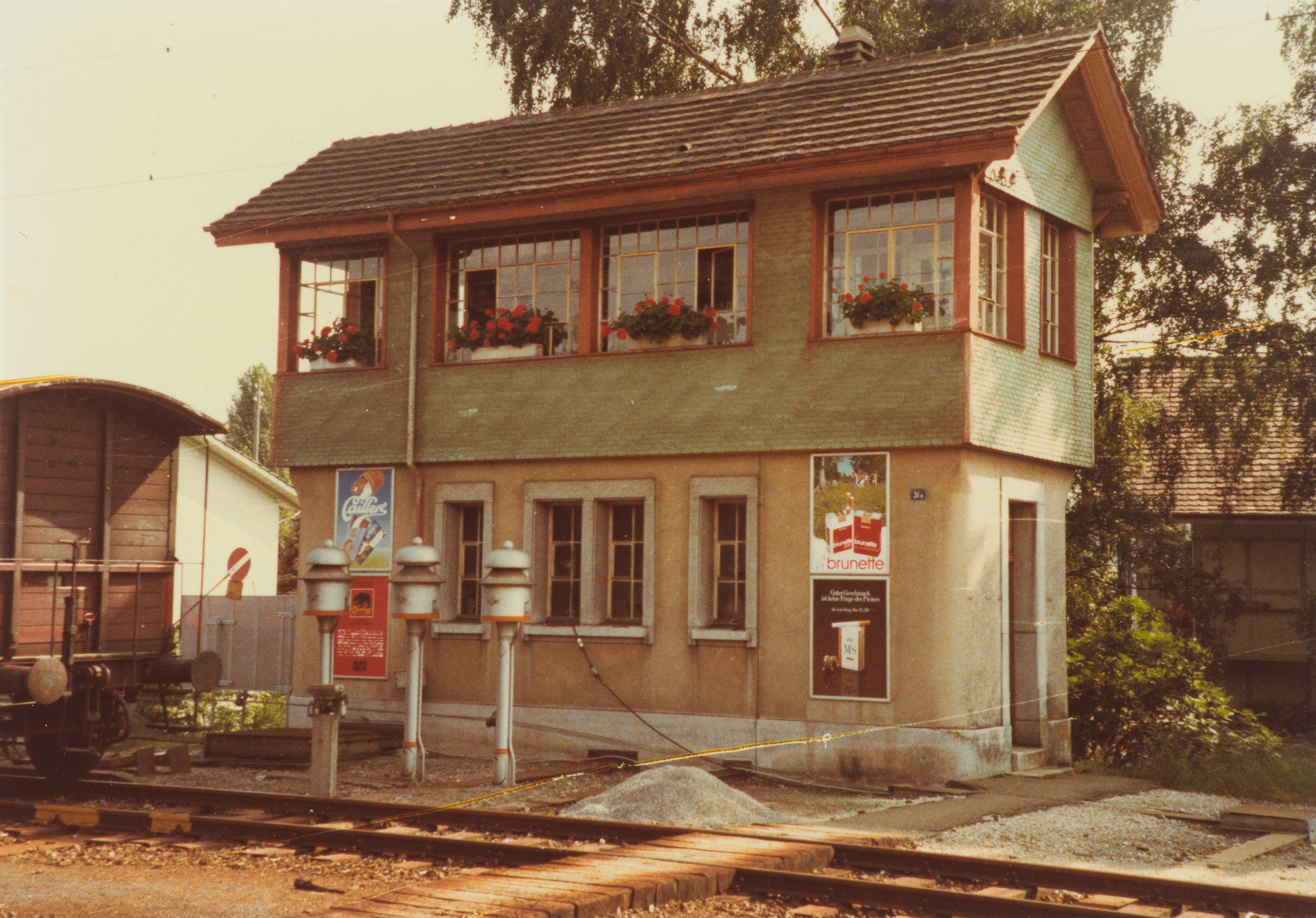
signal box (1978)
