= Wünnewil railway station =

Railway station in Wünnewil-Flamatt, Switzerland

Wünnewil
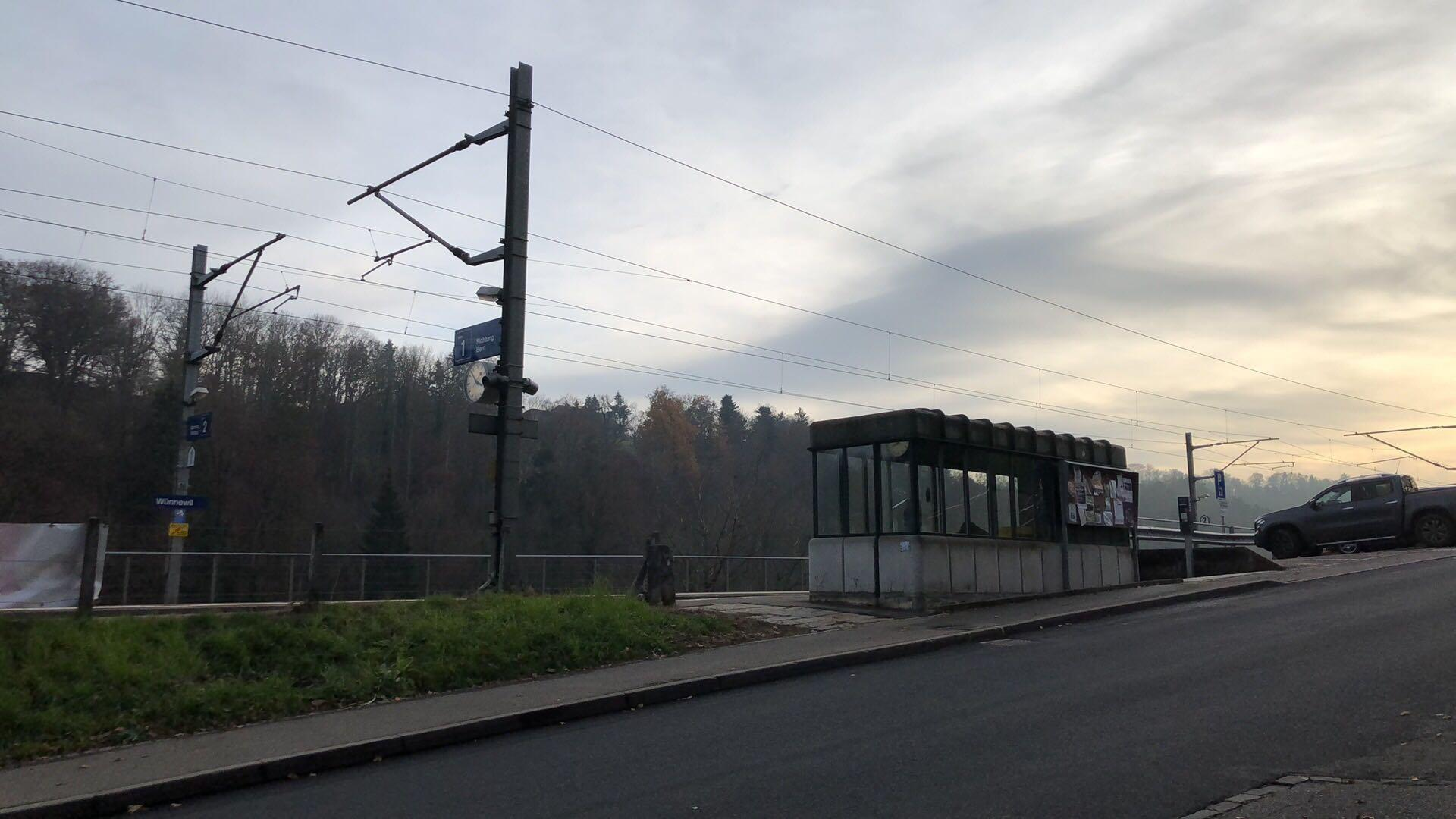
- The station in 2018

General information
- Location: Wünnewil-Flamatt; Switzerland
- Coordinates: 46°52′19″N 7°16′50″E
- Elevation: 588 m (1,929 ft)
- Owner: Swiss Federal Railways
- Line: Lausanne–Bern line
- Distance: 80.3 km (49.9 mi) from Lausanne
- Platforms: 2 side platforms
- Tracks: 2
- Train operators: BLS AG

Construction
- Parking: Yes (5 spaces)
- Cycle facilities: Yes (20 spaces)
- Accessible: No

Other information
- Station code: 8504113 (WUE)
- Fare zone: 13 and 14 (frimobil); 699 (Libero)

Passengers
- 2023: 830 per weekday (BLS)

Services
Preceding station	Bern S-Bahn	Following station
Schmitten FR towards Fribourg/Freiburg	S1	Flamatt towards Thun
Location

Wünnewil railway station (German: Bahnhof Wünnewil) is a railway station in the municipality of Wünnewil-Flamatt, in the Swiss canton of Fribourg. It is an intermediate stop on the standard gauge Lausanne–Bern line of Swiss Federal Railways.

== Services ==
As of the December 2024 timetable change, the following services stop at Wünnewil:

- Bern S-Bahn S1: half-hourly service between Fribourg/Freiburg and Thun.
