= Münsingen railway station =

Railway station in Münsingen, Switzerland

Münsingen
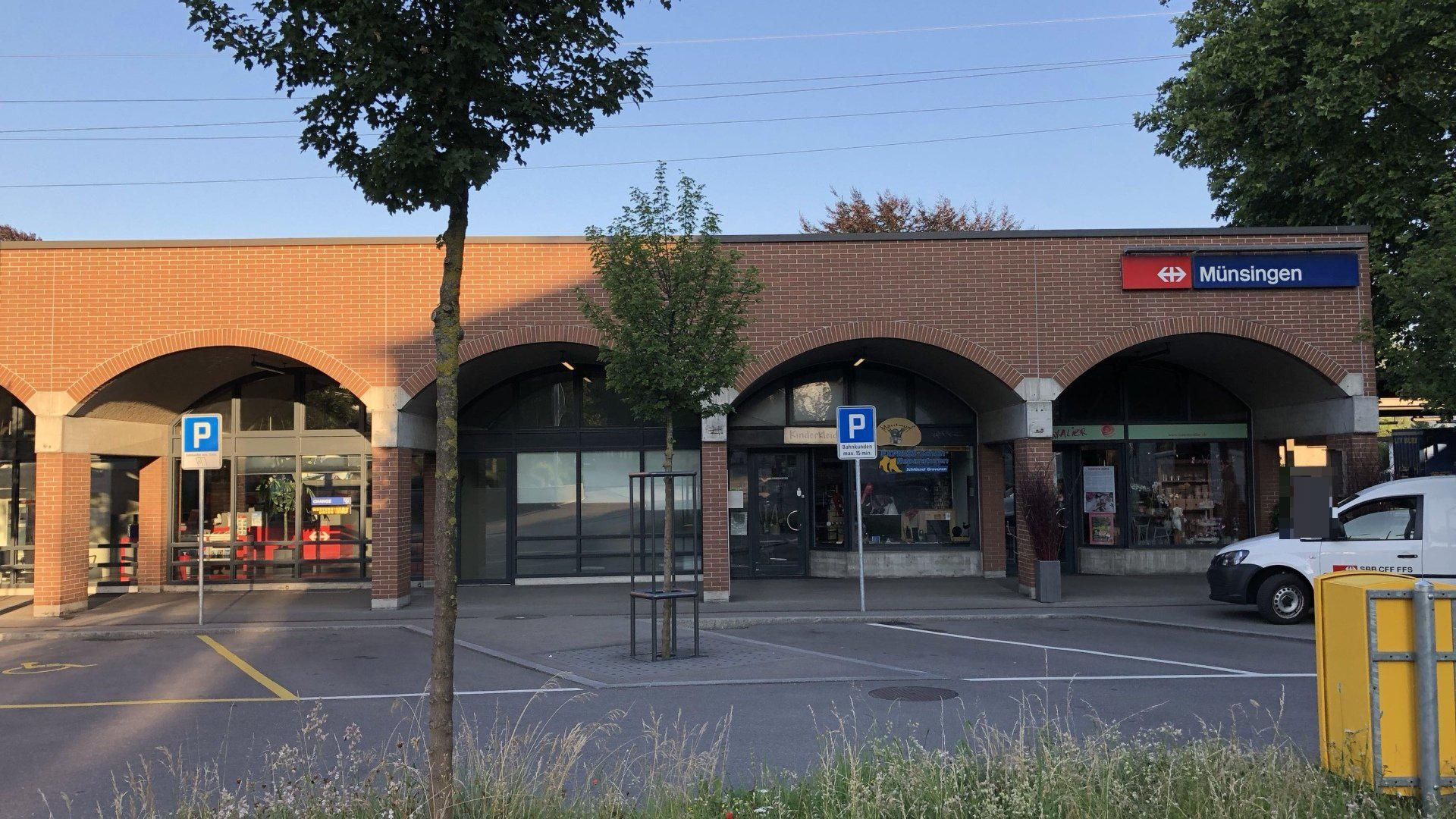
- The station building in 2018

General information
- Location: Münsingen; Switzerland
- Coordinates: 46°52′24″N 7°33′34″E
- Elevation: 531 m (1,742 ft)
- Owner: Swiss Federal Railways
- Line: Bern–Thun line
- Platforms: 3: 1 side platform; 1 island platform
- Tracks: 3
- Train operators: BLS AG
- Connections: BERNMOBIL buses

Construction
- Parking: Yes (74 spaces)
- Cycle facilities: Yes (70 spaces)
- Accessible: No

Other information
- Station code: 8507006 (MS)
- Fare zone: 126/626 (Libero)

Passengers
- 2023: 7'300 per weekday (BLS, SBB)

Services
Preceding station	Bern S-Bahn	Following station
Rubigen towards Fribourg/Freiburg	S1	Wichtrach towards Thun
Rubigen towards Bern	S11 Rush-hour service	Thun One-way operation
Preceding station	BLS	Following station
Bern Terminus	RE1	Thun towards Brig, Domodossola or Zweisimmen
Gümligen towards Biel/Bienne	RE11 Weekends only	Thun towards Brig
Location

Münsingen railway station (German: Bahnhof Münsingen) is a railway station in the municipality of Münsingen, in the Swiss canton of Bern. It is an intermediate stop on the standard gauge Bern–Thun line of Swiss Federal Railways.

== Services ==
As of the December 2024 timetable change, the following services stop at Münsingen:

- RegioExpress:
  - hourly service between Bern and Zweisimmen or Brig/Domodossola; the train splits at Spiez.
  - daily service on weekends during the high season between Biel/Bienne and Brig.
- Bern S-Bahn:
  - S1: half-hourly service between Fribourg/Freiburg and Thun.
  - S11: two daily rush-hour services on weekdays to Bern.
