= Wünnewil-Flamatt =

- Municipality
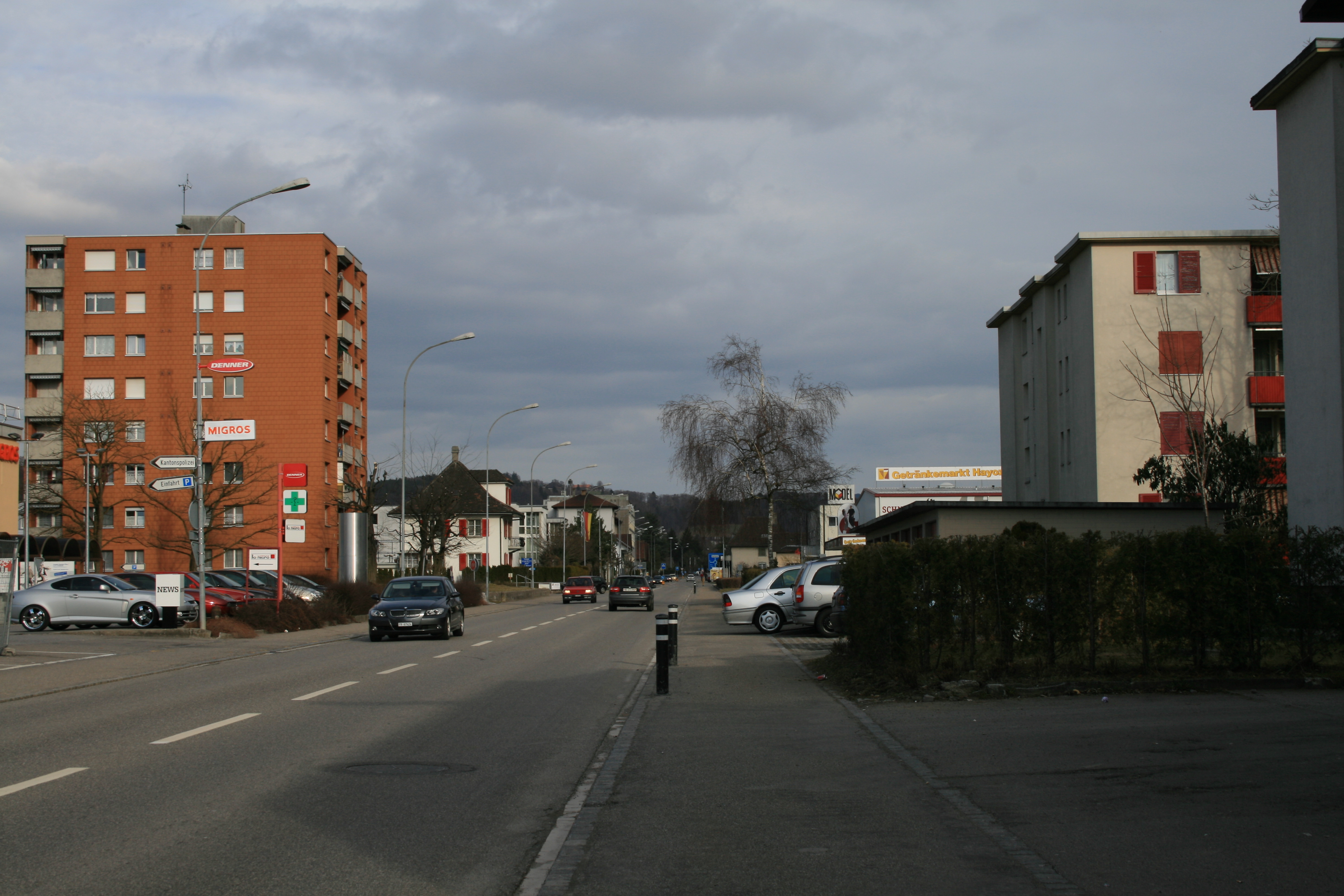
- Flamatt village

- Flag Coat of arms
- Location of Wünnewil-Flamatt
- Location within Switzerland Location within Canton of Fribourg
- Coordinates: 46°52′N 7°17′E
- Country: Switzerland
- Canton: Fribourg
- District: Sense

Government
  - Mayor: Gemeindeammann

Area
  - Total: 13.21 km^{2} (5.10 sq mi)
- Elevation: 628 m (2,060 ft)

Population (December 2020)
  - Total: 5,559
  - Density: 420.8/km^{2} (1,090/sq mi)
- Time zone: UTC+01:00 (CET)
  - Summer (DST): UTC+02:00 (CEST)
- Postal codes: 3184 Wünnewil; 3175 Flamatt
- SFOS number: 2309
- ISO 3166 code: CH-FR
- Surrounded by: Bösingen, Neuenegg (BE), Sankt Antoni, Schmitten, Ueberstorf
- Website: www.wuennewil-flamatt.ch

Wünnewil-Flamatt is a municipality in the district of Sense in the canton of Fribourg in the western part of Switzerland. It is one of the municipalities with a large majority of German speakers in the mostly French speaking Canton of Fribourg.

== Geography ==
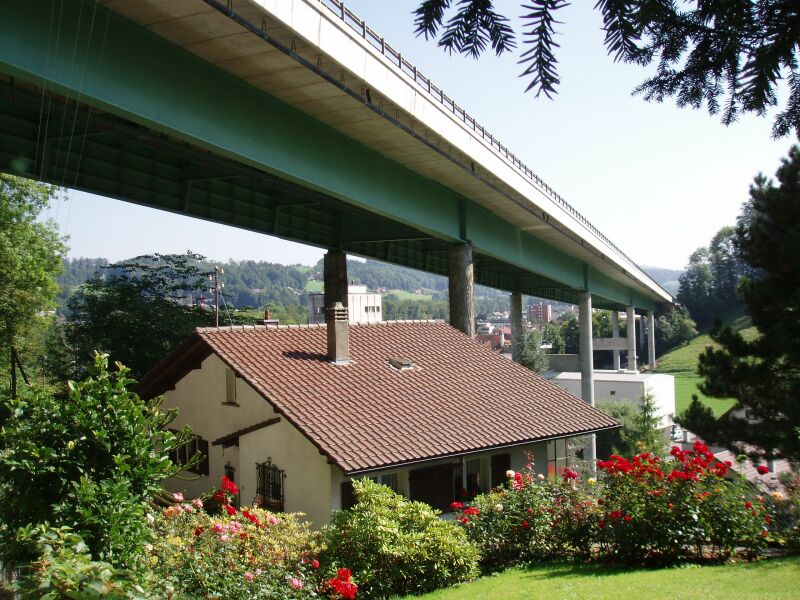
A12 Motorway at Flamatt

Aerial view (1958)

Wünnewil-Flamatt has an area of 13.27 km^{2} (5.12 sq mi). Of this area, 8.34 km^{2} (3.22 mi^{2}) or 63.0% is used for agricultural purposes, while 2.24 km^{2} (0.86 mi^{2}) or 16.9% is forested. Of the rest of the land, 2.56 km^{2} (0.99 mi^{2}) or 19.3% is settled (buildings or roads), 0.06 km^{2} (15 acres) or 0.5% is either rivers or lakes and 0.01 km^{2} (2.5 acres) or 0.1% is unproductive land.

Of the built up area, industrial buildings made up 1.4% of the total area while housing and buildings made up 7.0% and transportation infrastructure made up 7.6%. while parks, green belts and sports fields made up 3.4%. Out of the forested land, 15.0% of the total land area is heavily forested and 2.0% is covered with orchards or small clusters of trees. Of the agricultural land, 44.8% is used for growing crops and 16.3% is pastures, while 1.9% is used for orchards or vine crops. All the water in the municipality is flowing water.

== Coat of arms ==
The blazon of the municipal coat of arms is Sable a Bar Argent raised and in base a Grape Or slipped and leaved Vert.

== Demographics ==
Wünnewil-Flamatt has a population (as of December 2020) of 5,559. As of 2008, 16.8% of the population are resident foreign nationals. Over the last 10 years (2000–2010) the population has changed at a rate of 6.6%. Migration accounted for 3%, while births and deaths accounted for 5.1%.

Most of the population (as of 2000) speaks German (4,398 or 89.5%) as their first language, Albanian is the second most common (232 or 4.7%) and French is the third (89 or 1.8%). There are 52 people who speak Italian and 3 people who speak Romansh.

As of 2008, the population was 49.2% male and 50.8% female. The population was made up of 2,055 Swiss men (39.5% of the population) and 501 (9.6%) non-Swiss men. There were 2,220 Swiss women (42.7%) and 423 (8.1%) non-Swiss women. Of the population in the municipality, 1,568 or about 31.9% were born in Wünnewil-Flamatt and lived there in 2000. There were 957 or 19.5% who were born in the same canton, while 1,478 or 30.1% were born somewhere else in Switzerland, and 732 or 14.9% were born outside of Switzerland.

As of 2000, children and teenagers (0–19 years old) make up 26.9% of the population, while adults (20–64 years old) make up 61.8% and seniors (over 64 years old) make up 11.3%.

As of 2000, there were 2,068 people who were single and never married in the municipality. There were 2,403 married individuals, 218 widows or widowers and 227 individuals who are divorced.

As of 2000, there were 1,965 private households in the municipality, and an average of 2.5 persons per household. There were 543 households that consist of only one person and 167 households with five or more people. In 2000, a total of 1,902 apartments (91.7% of the total) were permanently occupied, while 90 apartments (4.3%) were seasonally occupied and 82 apartments (4.0%) were empty. As of 2009, the construction rate of new housing units was 5.7 new units per 1000 residents. The vacancy rate for the municipality, in 2010, was 0.92%.

The historical population is given in the following chart:

== Heritage sites of national significance ==
The De Weck country manor, the chapel of St. Beatus, the apartment buildings Flamatt 1 and 2 and the Zollhaus are listed as Swiss heritage site of national significance.

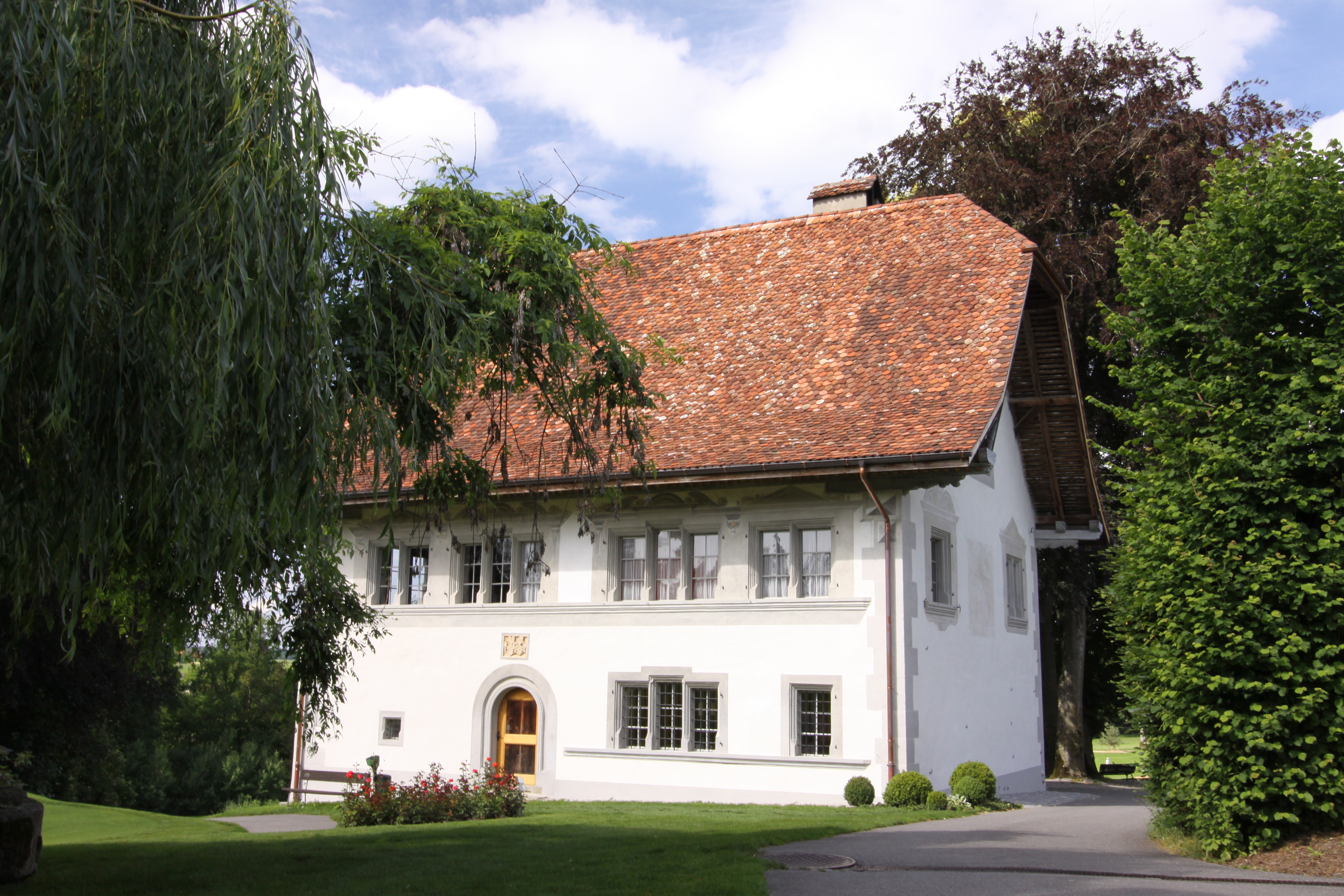
De Weck country estate

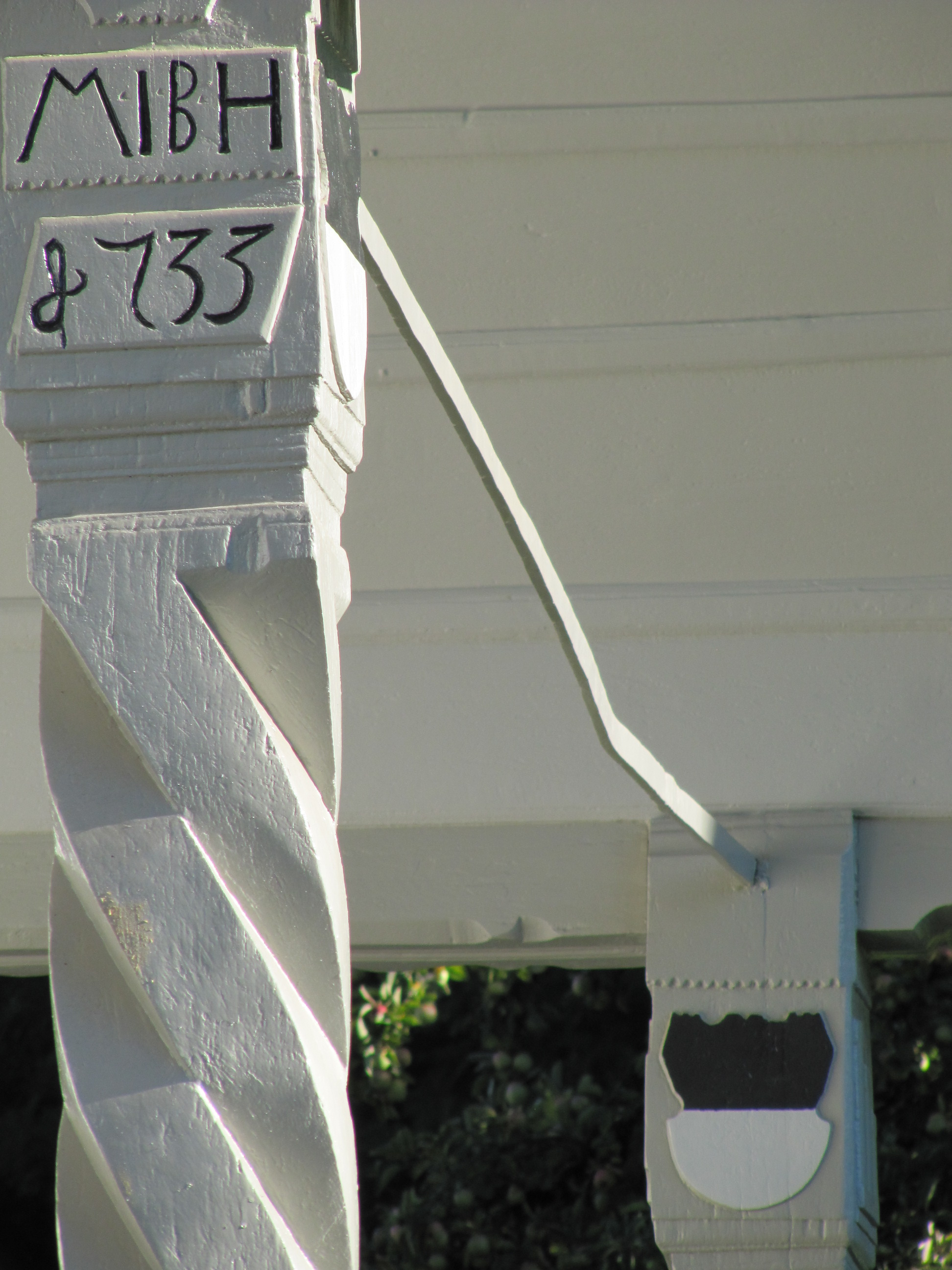
Chapel of St. Beatus

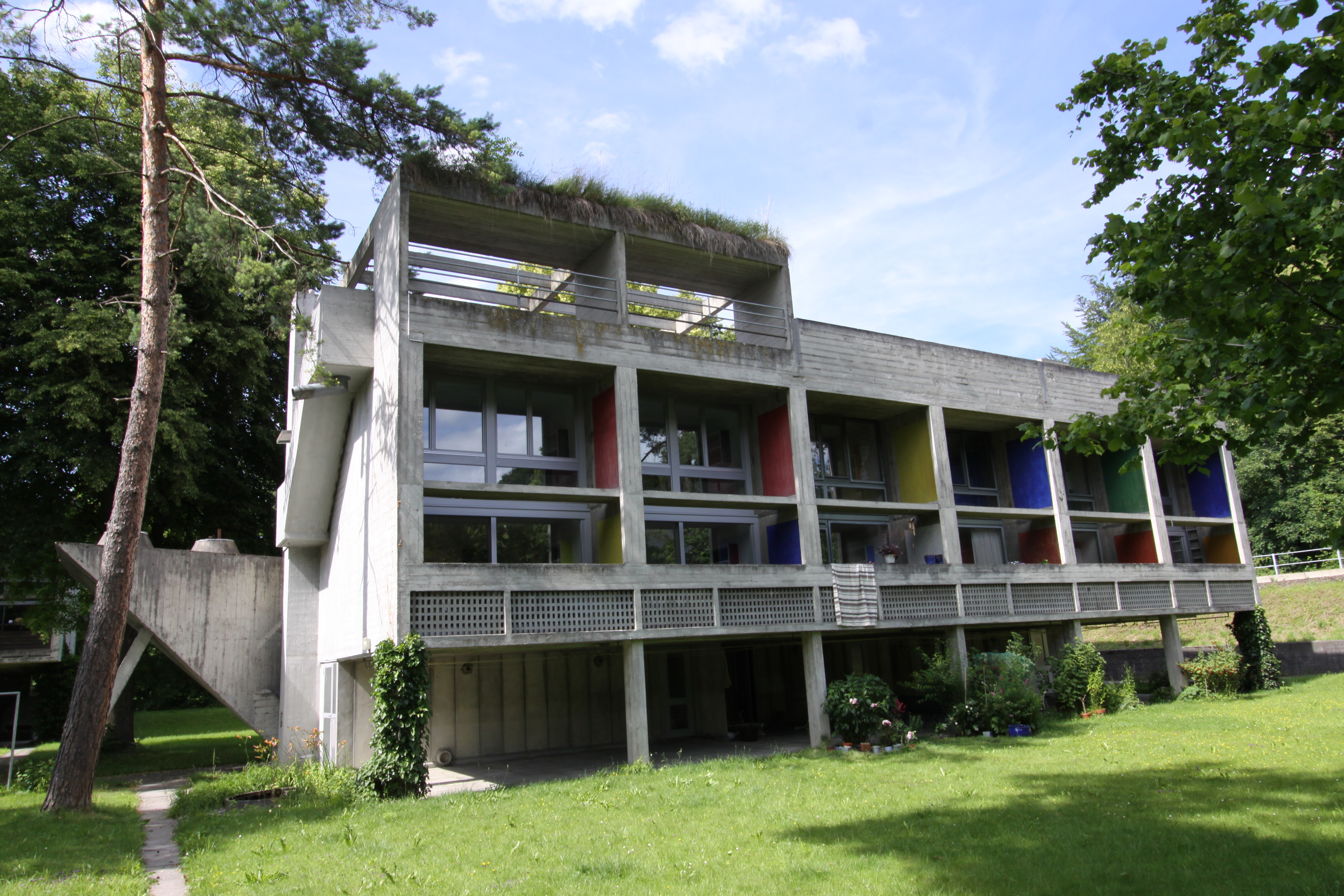
Apartment buildings Flamatt 1 and 2 at Neueneggstrasse 6–10

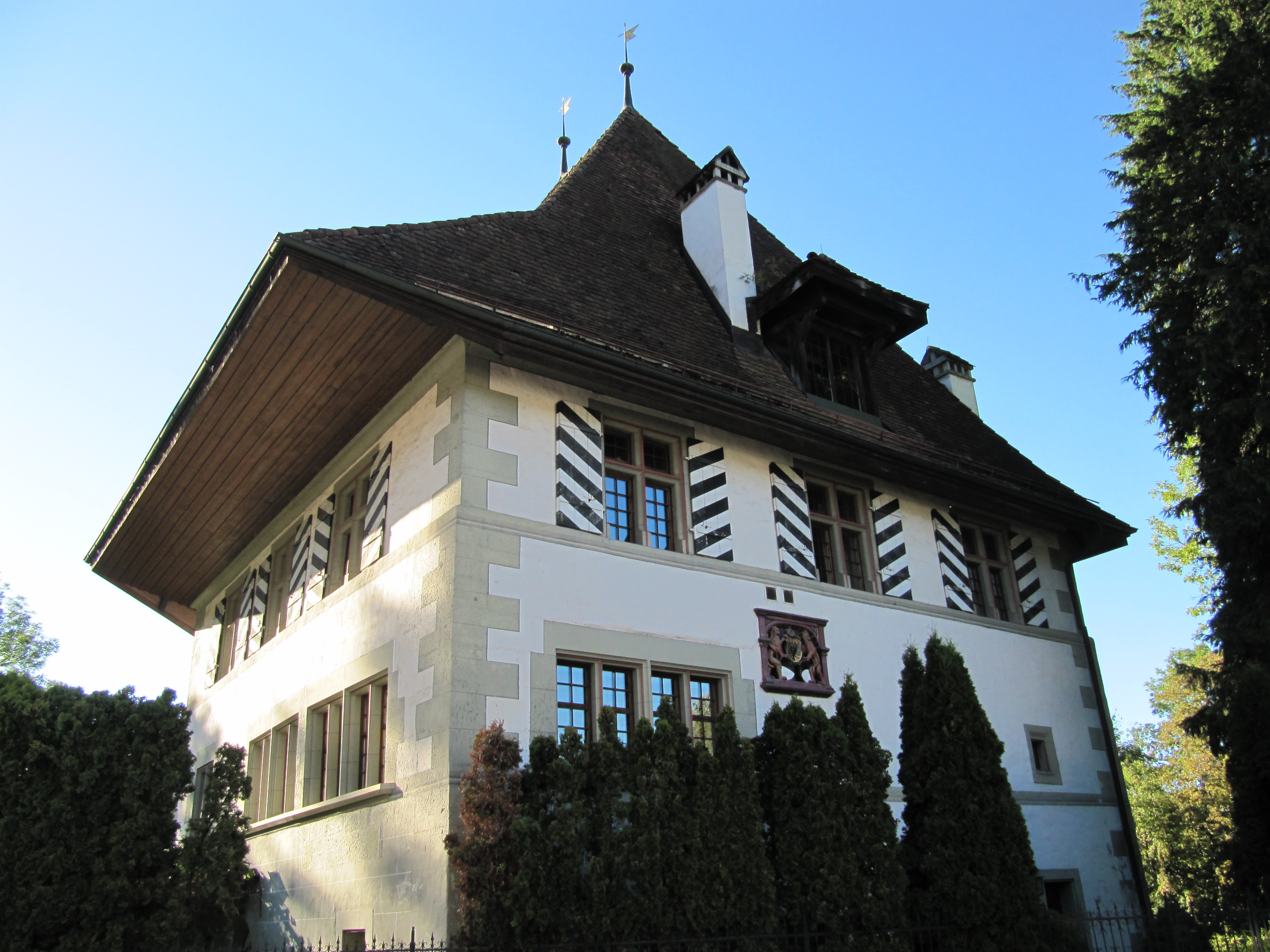
Zollhaus

== Politics ==
In the 2011 federal election the most popular party was the SVP which received 21.6% of the vote. The next three most popular parties were the SPS (20.1%), the CVP (19.1%) and the CSP (13.7%).

The SVP improved their position in Wünnewil-Flamatt rising to first, from second in 2007 (with 21.7%) The SPS moved from third in 2007 (with 17.4%) to second in 2011, the CVP moved from first in 2007 (with 23.4%) to third and the CSP retained about the same popularity (16.0% in 2007). A total of 1,542 votes were cast in this election, of which 20 or 1.3% were invalid.

== Economy ==
As of 2010, Wünnewil-Flamatt had an unemployment rate of 3.2%. As of 2008, there were 121 people employed in the primary economic sector and about 45 businesses involved in this sector. 753 people were employed in the secondary sector and there were 71 businesses in this sector. 1,020 people were employed in the tertiary sector, with 153 businesses in this sector. There were 2,639 residents of the municipality who were employed in some capacity, of which females made up 43.3% of the workforce.

In 2008 the total number of full-time equivalent jobs was 1,554. The number of jobs in the primary sector was 81, all of which were in agriculture. The number of jobs in the secondary sector was 713 of which 449 or (63.0%) were in manufacturing and 264 (37.0%) were in construction. The number of jobs in the tertiary sector was 760. In the tertiary sector; 212 or 27.9% were in wholesale or retail sales or the repair of motor vehicles, 41 or 5.4% were in the movement and storage of goods, 58 or 7.6% were in a hotel or restaurant, 52 or 6.8% were in the information industry, 22 or 2.9% were the insurance or financial industry, 115 or 15.1% were technical professionals or scientists, 61 or 8.0% were in education and 106 or 13.9% were in health care.

In 2000, there were 807 workers who commuted into the municipality and 1,944 workers who commuted away. The municipality is a net exporter of workers, with about 2.4 workers leaving the municipality for every one entering. Of the working population, 24% used public transportation to get to work, and 55.3% used a private car.

== Religion ==
From the 2000 census, 2,536 or 51.6% were Roman Catholic, while 1,423 or 28.9% belonged to the Swiss Reformed Church. Of the rest of the population, there were 31 members of an Orthodox church (or about 0.63% of the population), there were 5 individuals (or about 0.10% of the population) who belonged to the Christian Catholic Church, and there were 126 individuals (or about 2.56% of the population) who belonged to another Christian church. There were 441 (or about 8.97% of the population) who were Islamic. There were 20 individuals who were Buddhist, 5 individuals who were Hindu and 4 individuals who belonged to another church. 230 (or about 4.68% of the population) belonged to no church, are agnostic or atheist, and 155 individuals (or about 3.15% of the population) did not answer the question.

== Education ==
In Wünnewil-Flamatt about 1,850 or (37.6%) of the population have completed non-mandatory upper secondary education, and 445 or (9.1%) have completed additional higher education (either university or a Fachhochschule). Of the 445 who completed tertiary schooling, 71.5% were Swiss men, 22.5% were Swiss women, 4.5% were non-Swiss men and 1.6% were non-Swiss women.

The Canton of Fribourg school system provides one year of non-obligatory Kindergarten, followed by six years of Primary school. This is followed by three years of obligatory lower Secondary school where the students are separated according to ability and aptitude. Following the lower Secondary students may attend a three or four year optional upper Secondary school. The upper Secondary school is divided into gymnasium (university preparatory) and vocational programs. After they finish the upper Secondary program, students may choose to attend a Tertiary school or continue their apprenticeship.

During the 2010-11 school year, there were a total of 751 students attending 41 classes in Wünnewil-Flamatt. A total of 802 students from the municipality attended any school, either in the municipality or outside of it. There were 6 kindergarten classes with a total of 111 students in the municipality. The municipality had 17 primary classes and 333 students. During the same year, there were 17 lower secondary classes with a total of 297 students. There were no upper Secondary classes or vocational classes, but there were 76 upper Secondary students and 63 upper Secondary vocational students who attended classes in another municipality. The municipality had one special Tertiary class, with 10 specialized Tertiary students.

As of 2000, there were 110 students in Wünnewil-Flamatt who came from another municipality, while 144 residents attended schools outside the municipality.

== Transportation ==
The municipality has three railway stations: Flamatt and Wünnewil on the Lausanne–Bern line and Flamatt Dorf on the Flamatt–Laupen line. All three are served by the Bern S-Bahn.

== Notable people ==
- Tristan Scherwey, ice hockey player for the SC Bern
- Johan Vonlanthen, football player for the Servette FC

== Pictures ==
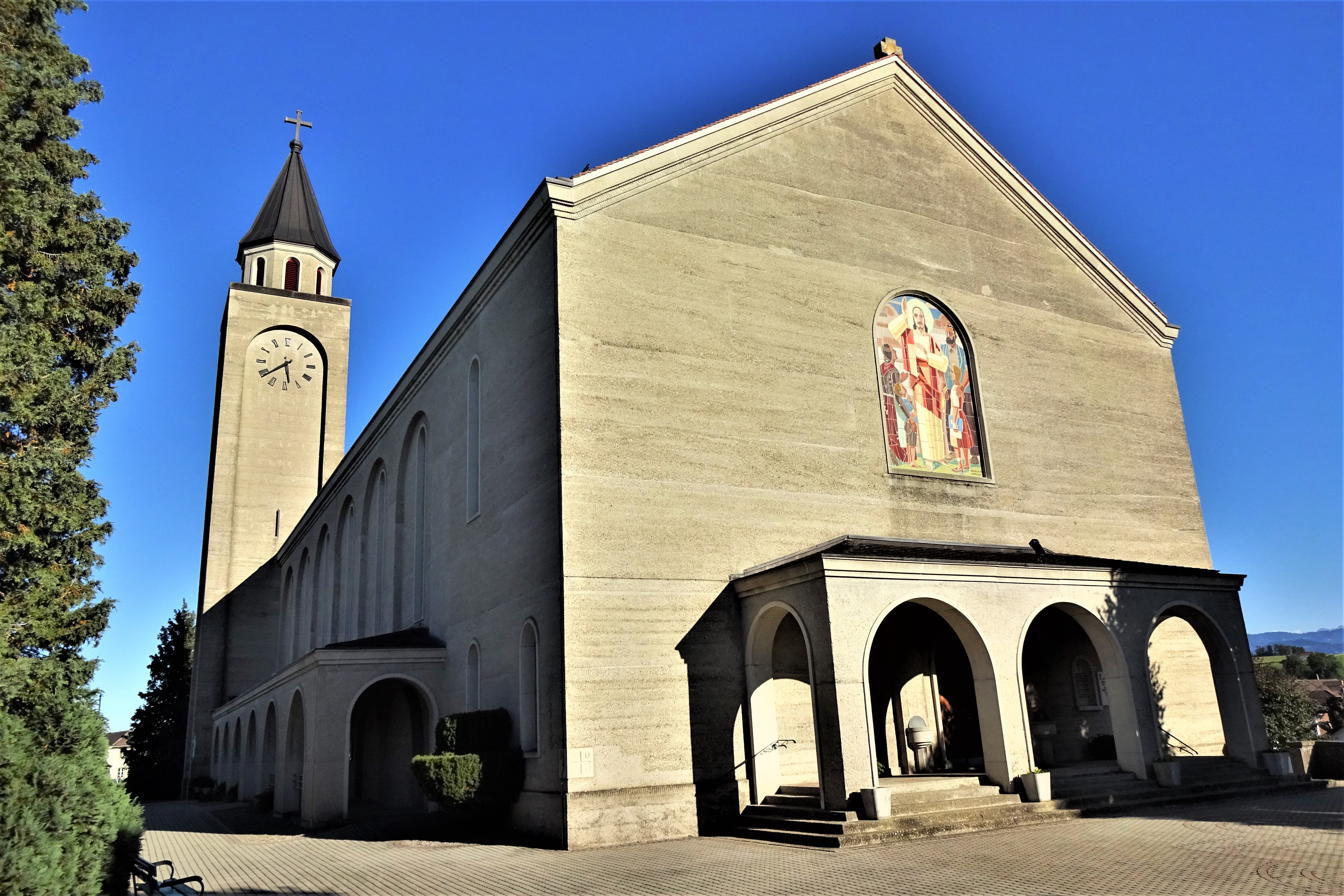
Wünnewil, Parish Church St. Margaretha (Augustin Genoud-Eggis, 1932): north façade with clocktower & main façade

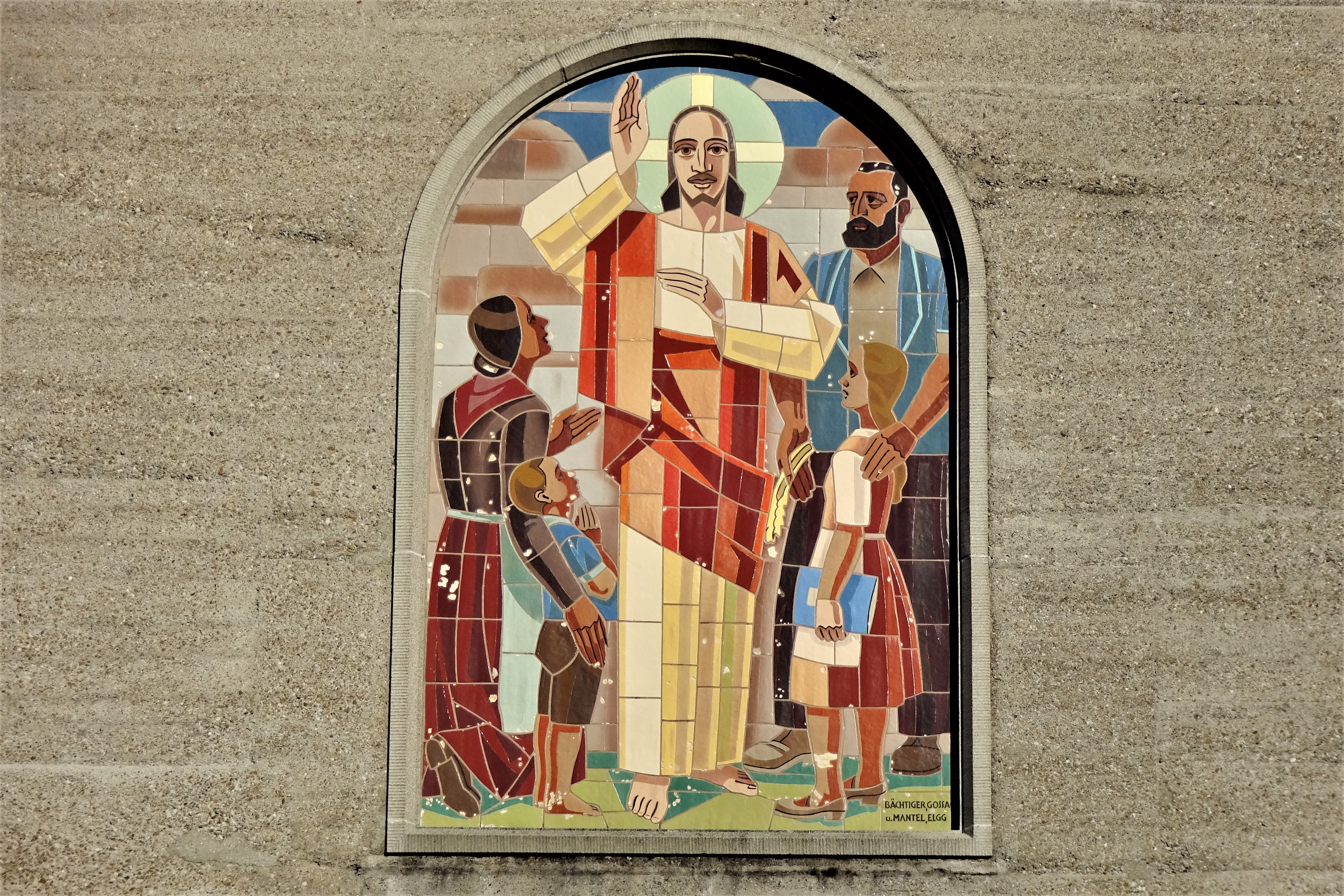
Wünnewil, Parish Church St. Margaretha (Augustin Genoud-Eggis, 1932): main façade with ceramic mosaic (Augustin Meinrad Bächtiger, 1937)

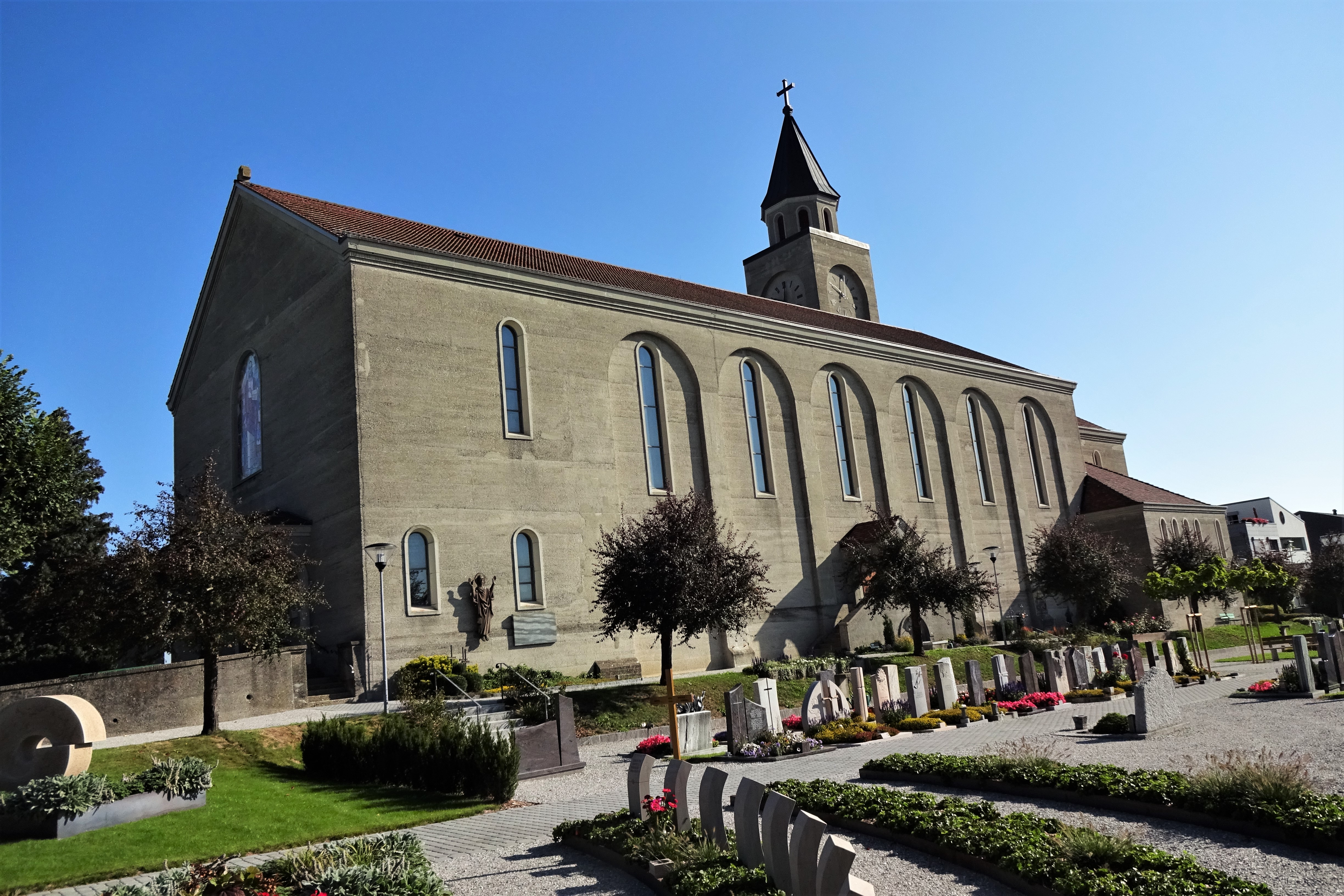
Wünnewil, Parish Church St. Margaretha (Augustin Genoud-Eggis, 1932): south façade & main façade

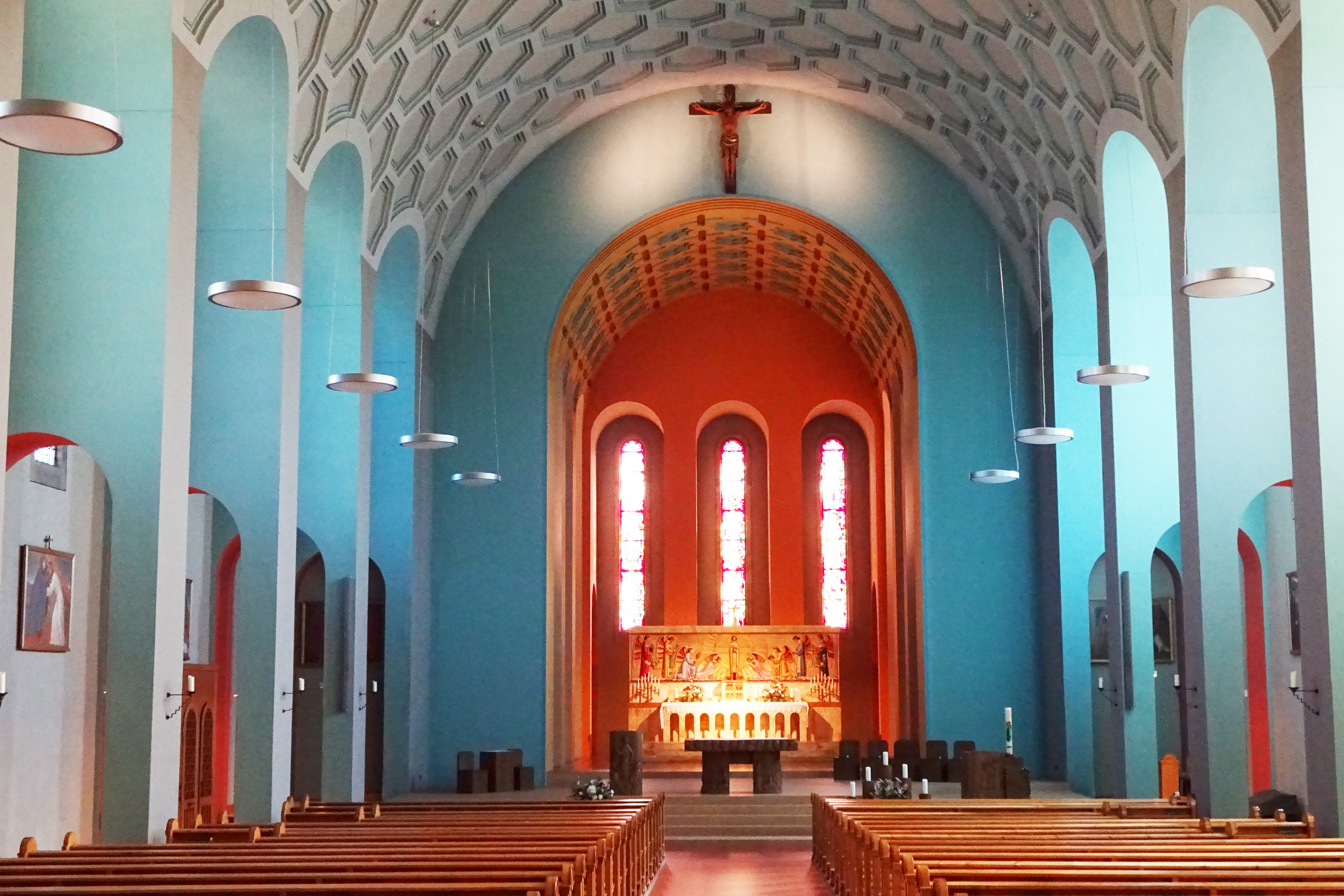
Wünnewil, Parish Church St. Margaretha (Augustin Genoud-Eggis, 1932): interior view

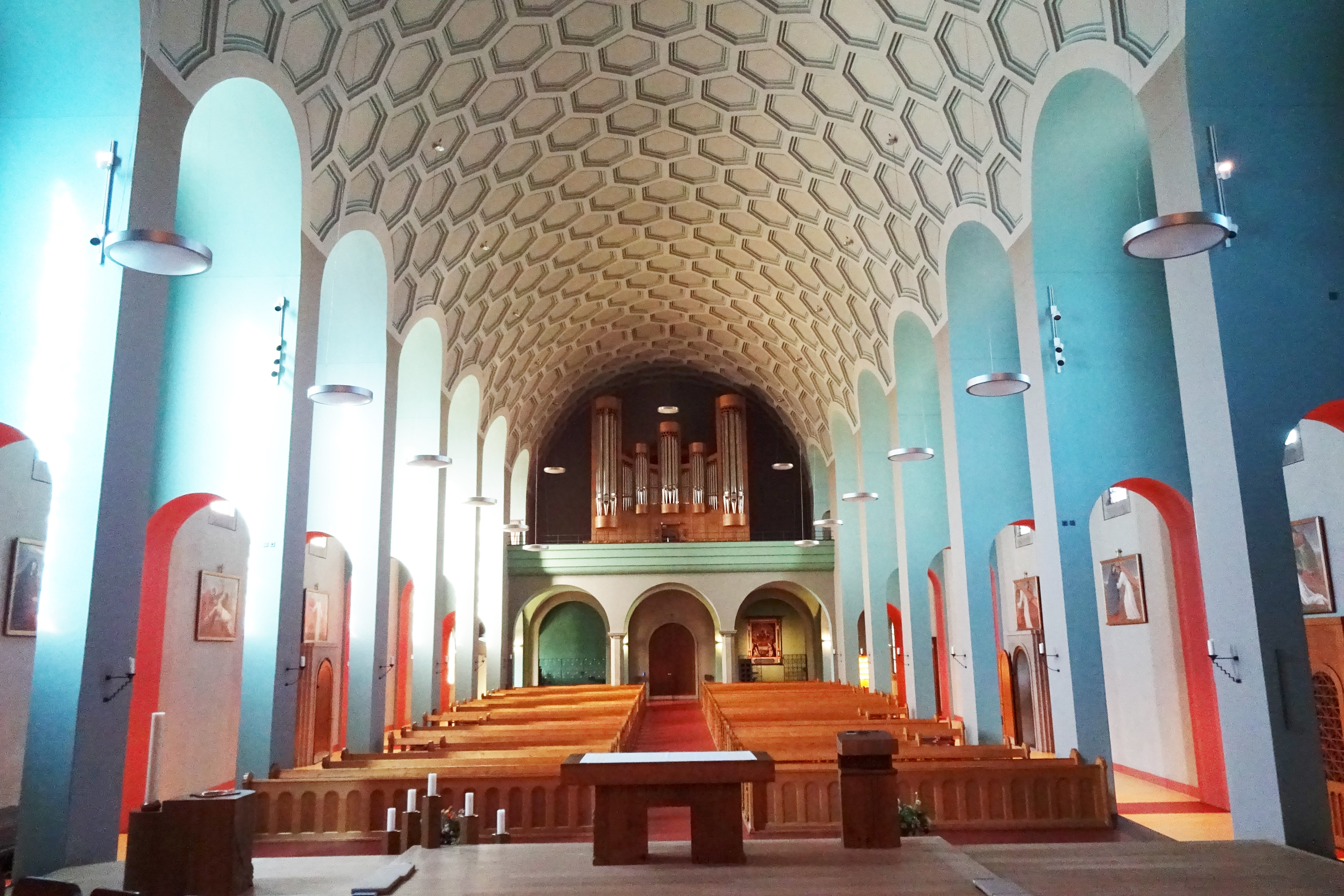
Wünnewil, Parish Church St. Margaretha (Augustin Genoud-Eggis, 1932): interior view

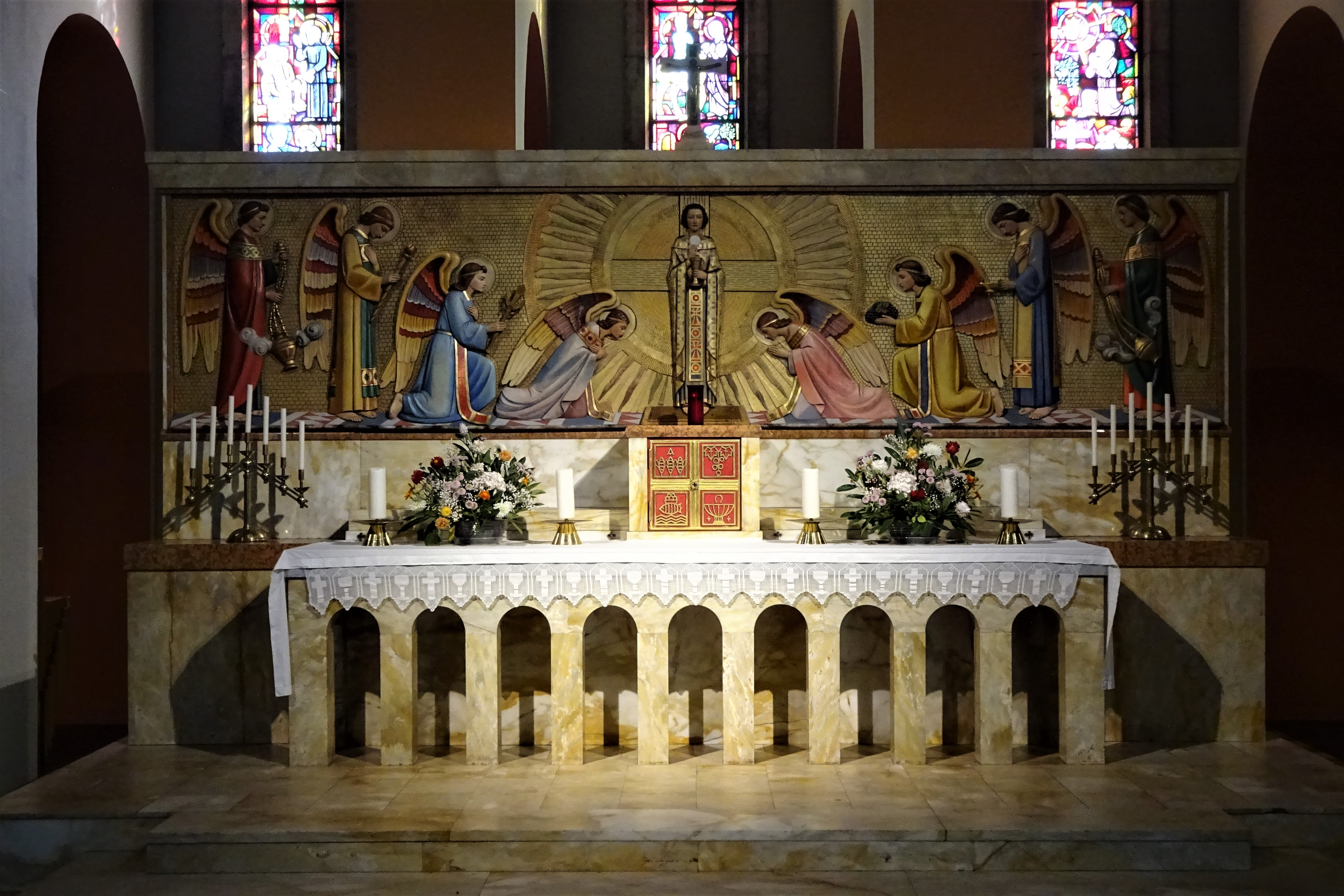
Wünnewil, Parish Church St. Margaretha (Augustin Genoud-Eggis, 1932): interior, high altar

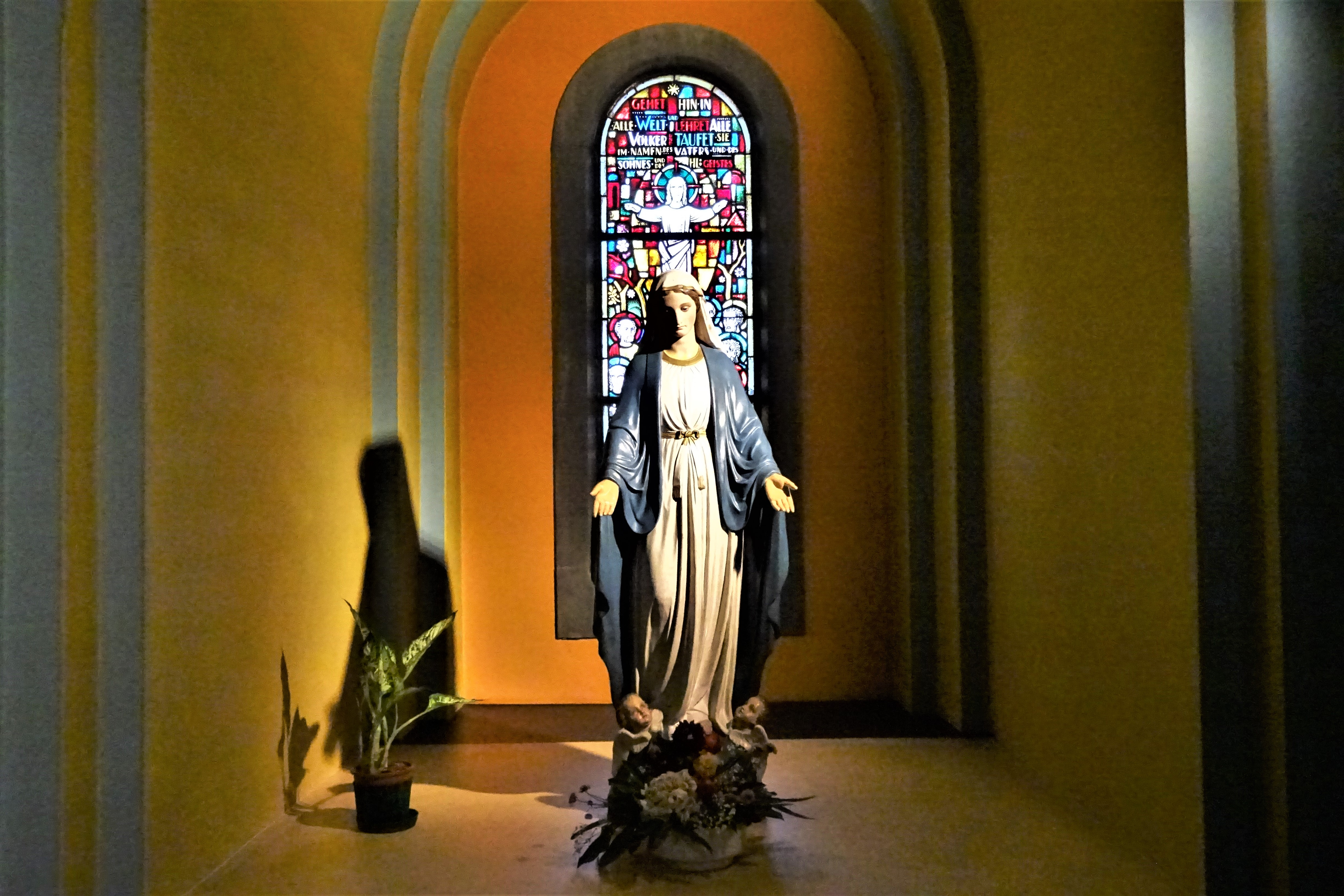
Wünnewil, Parish Church St. Margaretha (Augustin Genoud-Eggis, 1932): interior, side chapel

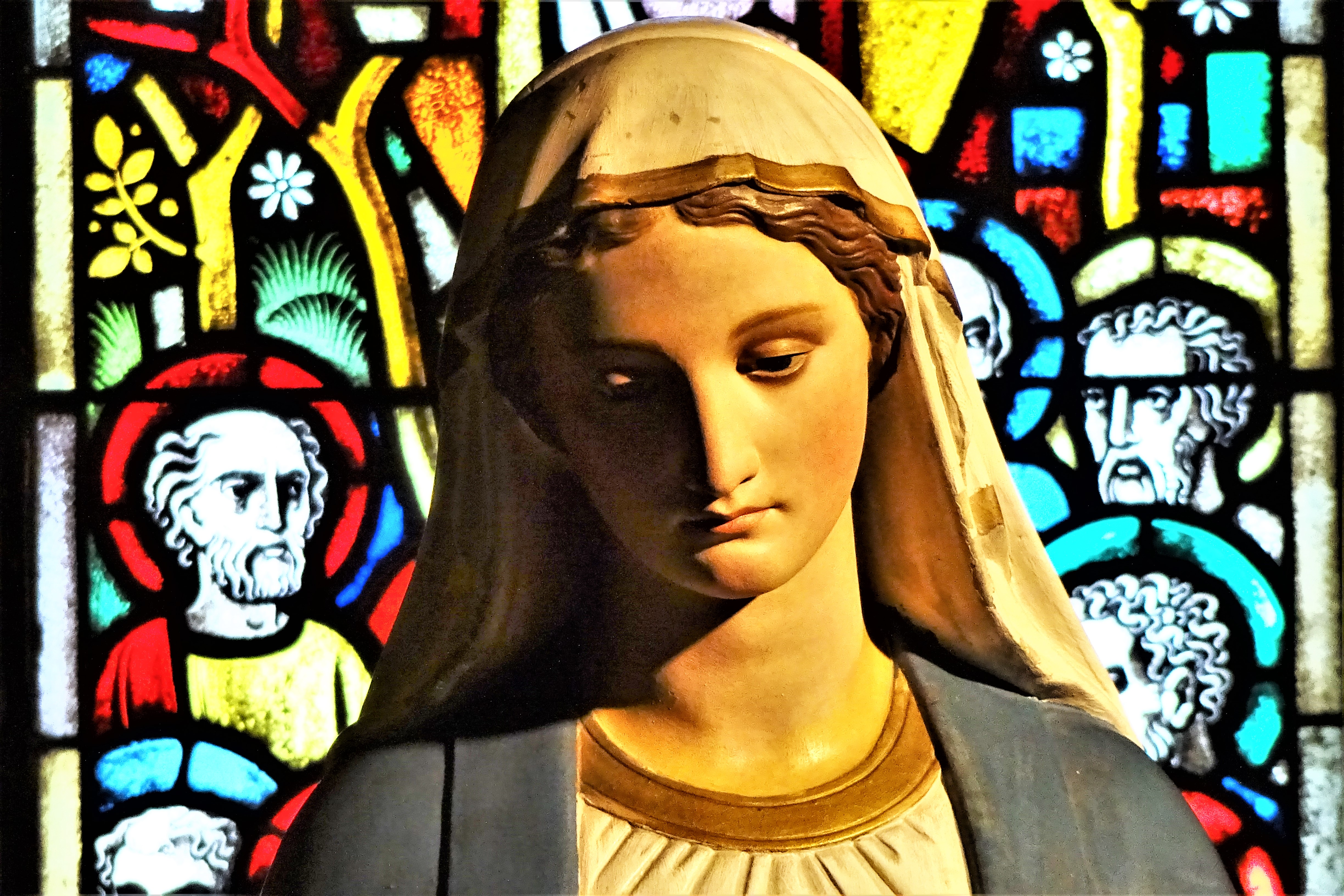
Wünnewil, Parish Church St. Margaretha (Augustin Genoud-Eggis, 1932): interior, side chapel (detail)
