= Thun railway station =

Railway station in Thun, Switzerland

Thun
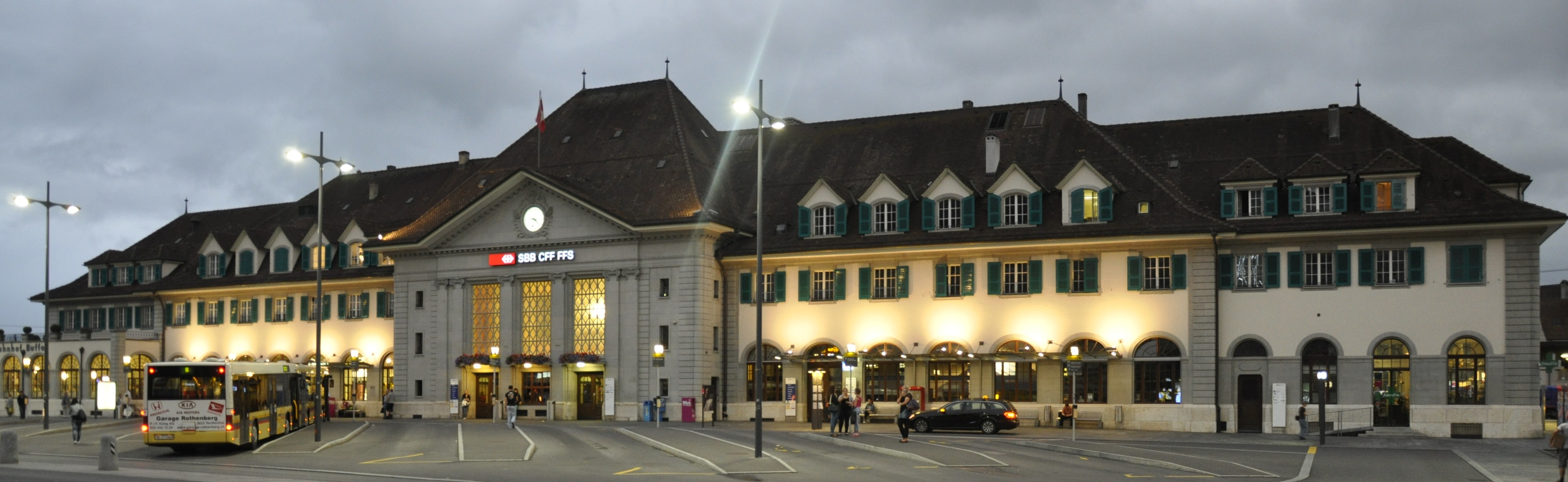
- The station in 2011

General information
- Location: Thun; Switzerland
- Coordinates: 46°45′17″N 7°37′47″E
- Elevation: 559 m (1,834 ft)
- Owner: Swiss Federal Railways
- Lines: Bern–Thun line; Burgdorf–Thun line; Gürbetal line; Lake Thun line
- Distance: 33.8 km (21.0 mi) from Hasle-Rüegsau; 34.5 km (21.4 mi) from Bern; 137.0 km (85.1 mi) from Bern
- Platforms: 1 side platform; 3 island platforms
- Tracks: 7 (passenger)
- Train operators: BLS AG; Deutsche Bahn; Swiss Federal Railways
- Connections: Verkehrsbetriebe STI buses; BLS AG on Lake Thun

Construction
- Parking: Yes (129 spaces)
- Cycle facilities: Yes
- Accessible: Yes

Other information
- Station code: 8507100 (TH)
- Fare zone: 700 (Libero)

Passengers
- 2025: 32,800 per day (BLS, SBB)
- Rank: 20 out of 1,095
Services
Preceding station	SBB CFF FFS	Following station
Bern towards Hamburg-Altona	EuroCity	Spiez towards Interlaken Ost
Bern towards Basel SBB	EuroCity	Spiez towards Milano Centrale
Bern towards Basel SBB	IC 6	Spiez towards Brig
Bern towards Basel SBB	IC 61	Spiez towards Interlaken Ost
Bern towards Romanshorn	IC 8	Spiez towards Brig
Bern towards Romanshorn	IC 81	Spiez towards Interlaken Ost
Preceding station	DB Fernverkehr	Following station
Bern towards Berlin Ostbahnhof	ICE 12	Spiez towards Brig or Interlaken Ost
Preceding station	Bern S-Bahn	Following station
Uttigen towards Fribourg/Freiburg	S1	Terminus
Münsingen towards Bern	S11 Rush-hour service	Terminus
Steffisburg towards Konolfingen	S21	Terminus
Uetendorf Allmend towards Langnau i.E.	S4	Terminus
Steffisburg towards Solothurn	S41	Terminus
Schwäbis towards Hasle-Rüegsau	S42	Terminus
Uetendorf Allmend towards Solothurn or Sumiswald-Grünen	S44	Terminus
Preceding station	BLS	Following station
Münsingen towards Bern	RE1	Spiez towards Brig, Domodossola or Zweisimmen
Münsingen towards Biel/Bienne	RE11 Weekends only	Spiez towards Brig
Location
- Location within Switzerland Location within Canton of Bern

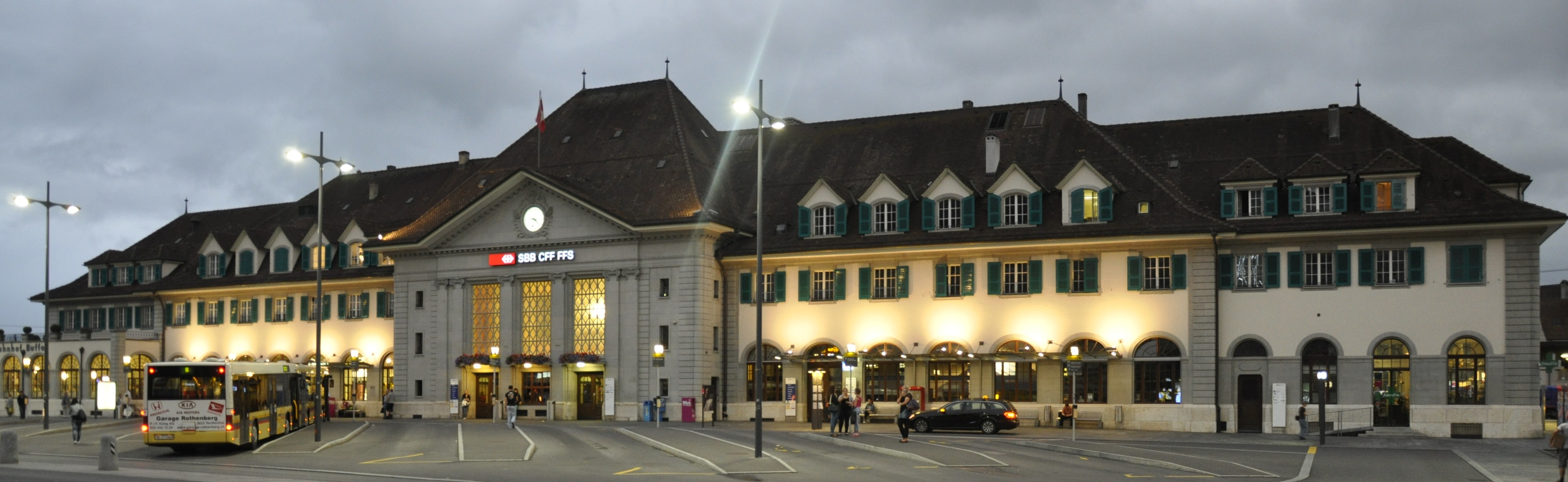
The station in 2011

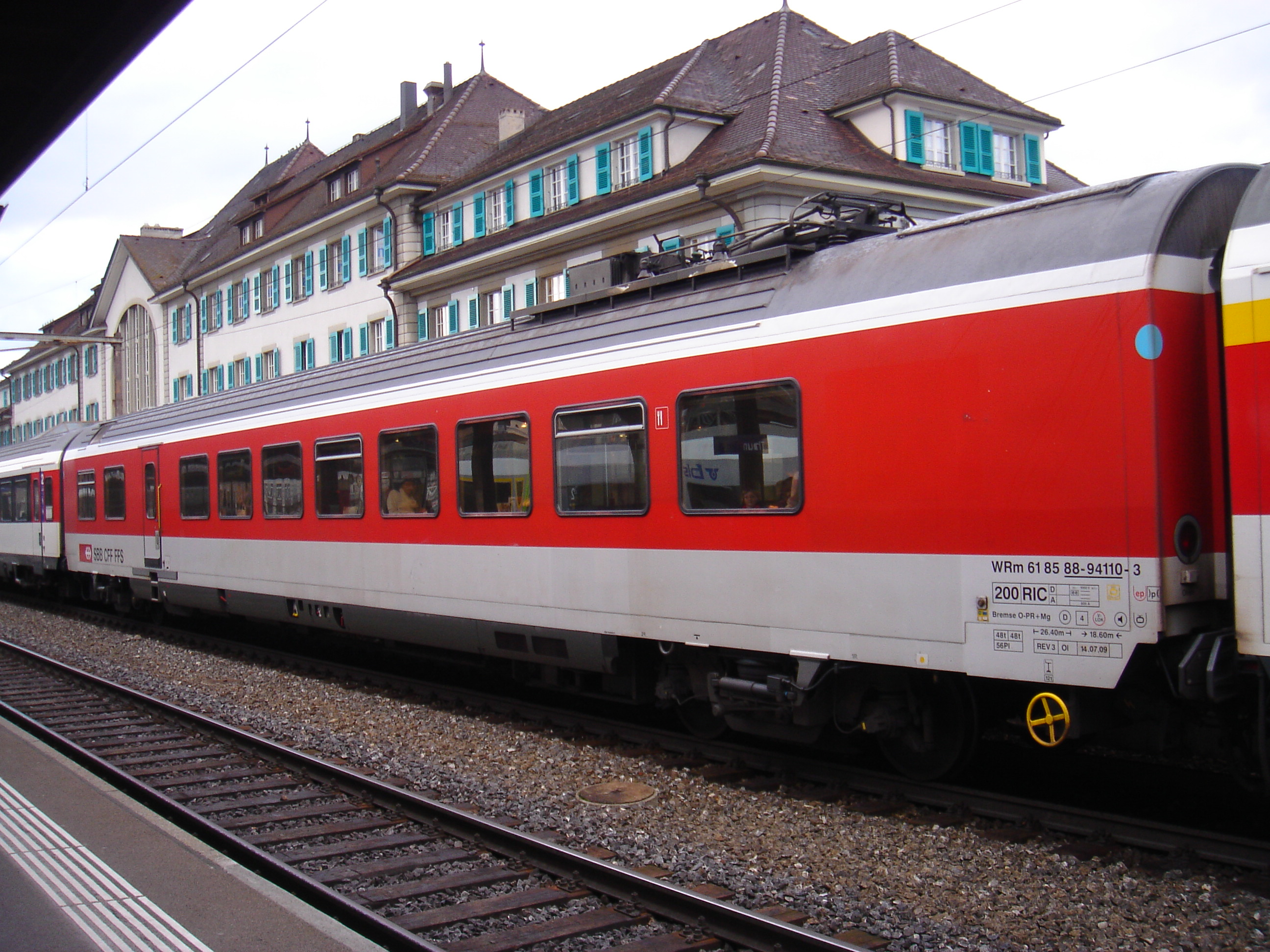
A train at the station

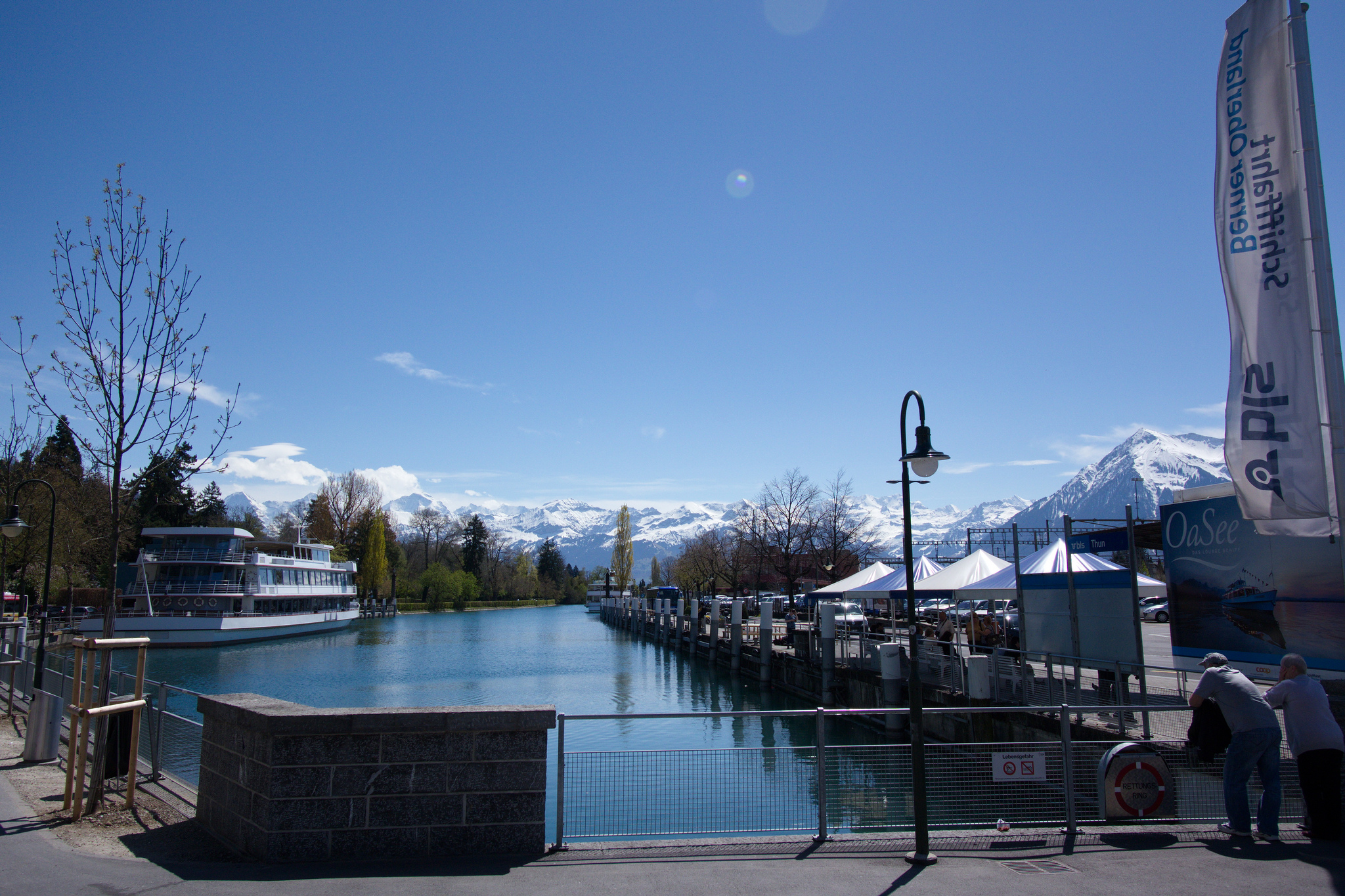
The quay at Thun station; the rail platforms are to the right

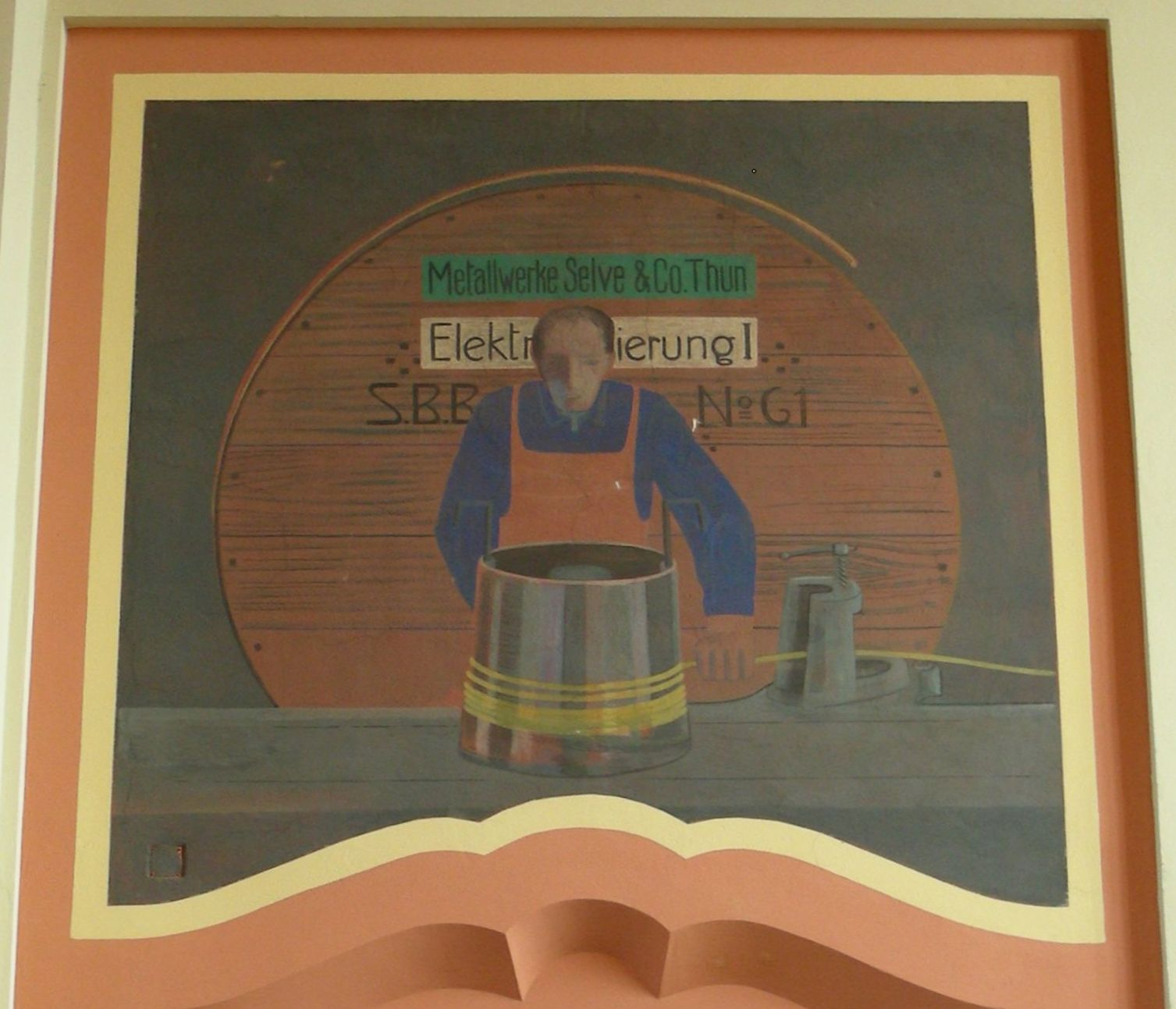
Wall painting in Thun station concourse

Thun is a railway station in the town of Thun, in the Swiss canton of Bern. At the station, the Swiss Federal Railways owned Bern to Thun main line makes a junction with the other lines, all owned by the BLS AG. These lines are the Gürbetal line from Bern via Belp, the Burgdorf to Thun line from Burgdorf via Konolfingen, and the Lake Thun line to Spiez and Interlaken.

The station is served by various operators, including BLS, Swiss Federal Railways (SBB) and Deutsche Bahn.

The station also provides an interchange with the local bus network provided by the Verkehrsbetriebe STI. Ships of the BLS-owned fleet on Lake Thun serve a quay at the station, which they access via a navigable stretch of the Aare and the Thun ship canal.

== Services ==
As of the December 2024 timetable change, the following services stop at Thun:

- EuroCity / InterCity / Intercity Express (ICE): half-hourly service between Basel SBB and Spiez. Most northbound trains terminate in Basel; a single EuroCity continues to Hamburg-Altona and two ICEs continue to Berlin Ostbahnhof. Most southbound trains continue to Interlaken Ost; one train every two hours continues to Brig.
- EuroCity / InterCity: trains every two hours between Basel SBB and Brig; EuroCity trains continue from Brig to Milano Centrale via Domodossola.
- InterCity: hourly service between Romanshorn and Brig.
- RegioExpress:
  - hourly service between Bern and Zweisimmen or Brig/Domodossola; the train splits at Spiez.
  - daily service on weekends during the high season between Biel/Bienne and Brig.
- Bern S-Bahn:
  - S1: half-hourly service to Fribourg/Freiburg.
  - S11: two daily rush-hour services on weekdays to Bern.
  - S21 / S41 / S42 : three trains per hour to Konolfingen, from Konolfingen, half-hourly service to Hasle-Rüegsau, with every other train continuing to Solothurn.
  - S4: hourly service to Langnau.
  - S44: hourly service to Solothurn or Sumiswald-Grünen.

== See also ==
- Rail transport in Switzerland
