= Bern–Thun railway line =

Key western Swiss transport link

Bern–Thun
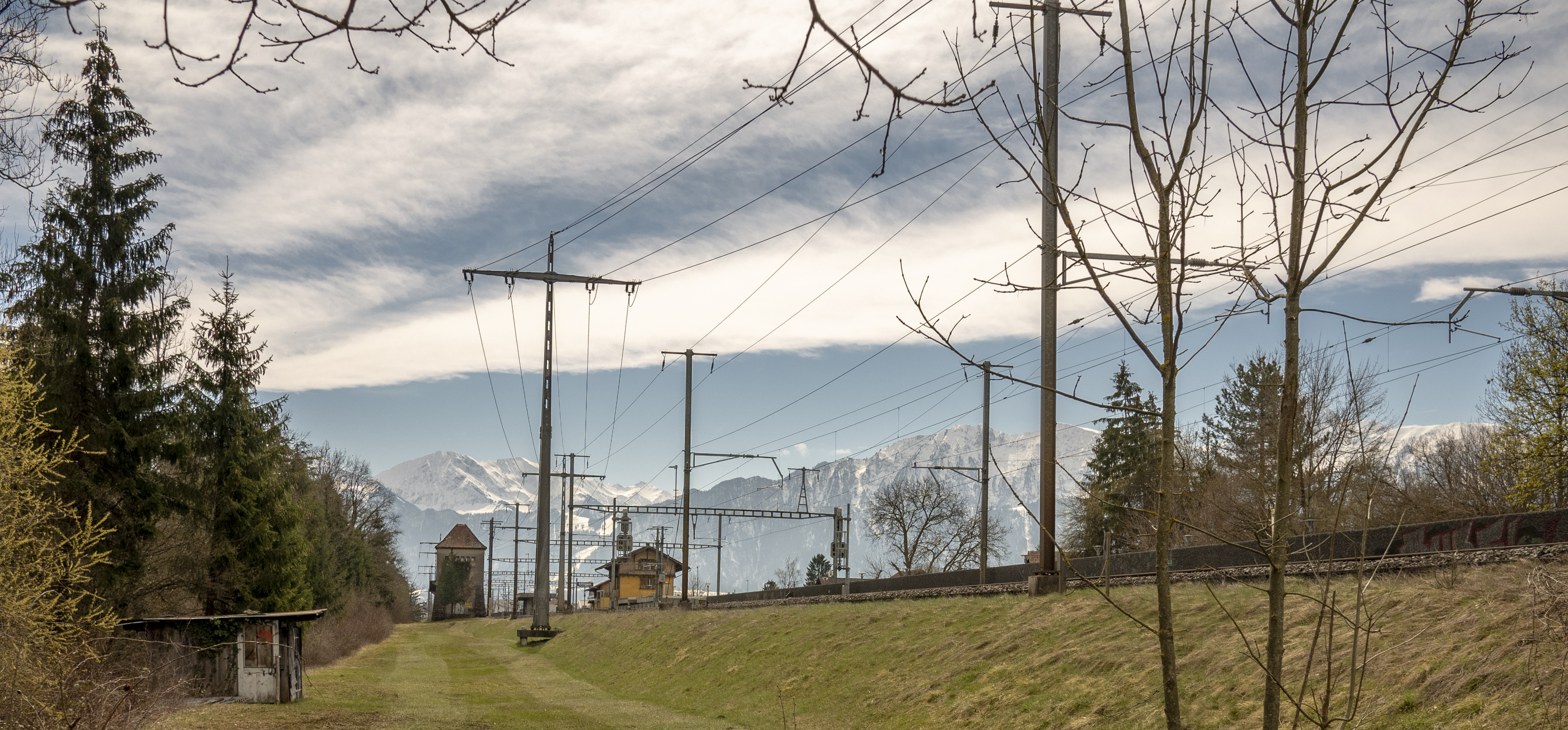
- Bern–Thun railway

Overview
- Locale: Switzerland
- Termini: Bern; Thun

Technical
- Line length: 31 km (19 mi)
- Number of tracks: 2
- Track gauge: 1,435 mm (4 ft 8 1/2 in)
- Electrification: 15 kV/16.7 Hz AC overhead catenary
- Operating speed: 160 km/h (99 mph)

The Bern–Thun railway line is a double-tracked, electrified railway line that runs through the Aare valley in the Swiss canton of Bern. It is part of the Lötschberg-Simplon axis between Germany and Italy. It was opened in 1859 by the Swiss Central Railway (Schweizerische Centralbahn).

== History ==
The line from Bern to Thun was opened by the Swiss Central Railway on 1 July 1859. The line began in Wylerfeld and used the line opened from Olten to Bern station in 1858. In 1861, it was extended by a little over a kilometre from Thun to Scherzligen, where there was a connection to the steamboats on Lake Thun. These were initially the only way for passengers to continue their trips. From 1873, freight wagons were carried on a ferry service to Därligen station on the Bödeli Railway (Bödelibahn), which at that time was operated as an island operation. It was not until 1893 that the Lake Thun Railway (Thunerseebahn) opened a connection to Därligen. With the construction of Thun station (1923) between the two old Thun stations and the building of the navigation canal between the lakes (1925), the two old stations lost their former function. The old Thun station was converted into a carriage depot. Passenger services at Scherzligen station were abandoned and it was converted into sidings for the new station.

The Central Railway was one of the major private railways that were nationalised and the line passed into the possession of the Swiss Federal Railways (Schweizerische Bundesbahnen, SBB) on 1 January 1902.

The route between Bern Wylerfeld and Ostermundigen was relocated in 1912. The new line, which had been built as double track, was put into operation on 20 May 1912. The old line ran from the points at the western approach to the carriage sidings at Wylerfeld, continuing south of the grosse Allmend to Ostermundigen.

With the opening of the Lötschberg mountain railway in 1913, the line gained importance as a feeder to the Simplon Railway for transit traffic to Italy. It was then gradually converted to double track up to 1921 and electrified in 1918/1919. The first part of the Thun–Scherzligen line was electrified from 2 December 1918 to allow BLS trains to enter Thun station. Electrification of the rest of the line to Bern followed on 7 July 1919. It was the first electrified line of the SBB that was not operated only as a test track and it was the first line electrified with single-phase alternating current at 15,000 Volt and a frequency of 16.7 Herz. The reason why the track was electrified before the Gotthard Railway, was that the BLS had already completed a power station in 1913, while a power station had to be built before electrical operations could commence on the Gotthard.

With the construction and commissioning of the Lorraine viaduct and the building of the approach to Bern station along Dammstrasse/West Ring in 1941, the line via the Red Bridge was abandoned. The new line was built with two tracks. Since 1941, four mainline tracks have operated between Bern station and Wylerfeld.

The Löchligut–Wankdorf connecting line was put into operation on 21 May 1967. This ended the reversal of (through) freight trains at the oblique junction in Bern Wylerfeld, because freight trains are now able to run directly from Zollikofen to Ostermundigen.

Allmendingen station, which had been opened on 20 July 1922, was closed at the timetable change in 1982 and public transport services to the community were replaced by a VBW/SZB bus service.

== Operations ==
In long-distance traffic, the line is served by InterCity services on the Interlaken–Basel and Brig–Basel/–Zürich–Romanshorn routes as well as EuroCity services on the Milan–Basel route. In local traffic, BLS AG operates line S1 of the Bern S-Bahn and the Bern–Brig/–Zweisimmen RegioExpress service (using Lötschberger sets). Freight transport is dominated by through freight trains to Italy, including those on the rolling highway.

== Sources ==
- Trüb, Walter (1988). 100 Jahre elektrische Bahnen in der Schweiz (in German). Orell Füssli. p. 79.
- Wägli, Hans G.; Jacobi, Sébastien (2010). Schienennetz Schweiz - Bahnprofil Schweiz CH+ [Swiss rail network] (in German) (3rd ed.). Zürich: AS Verlag. ISBN 978-3-909111-74-9.
