= S1 (Bern S-Bahn) =

Railway in Bern, Switzerland

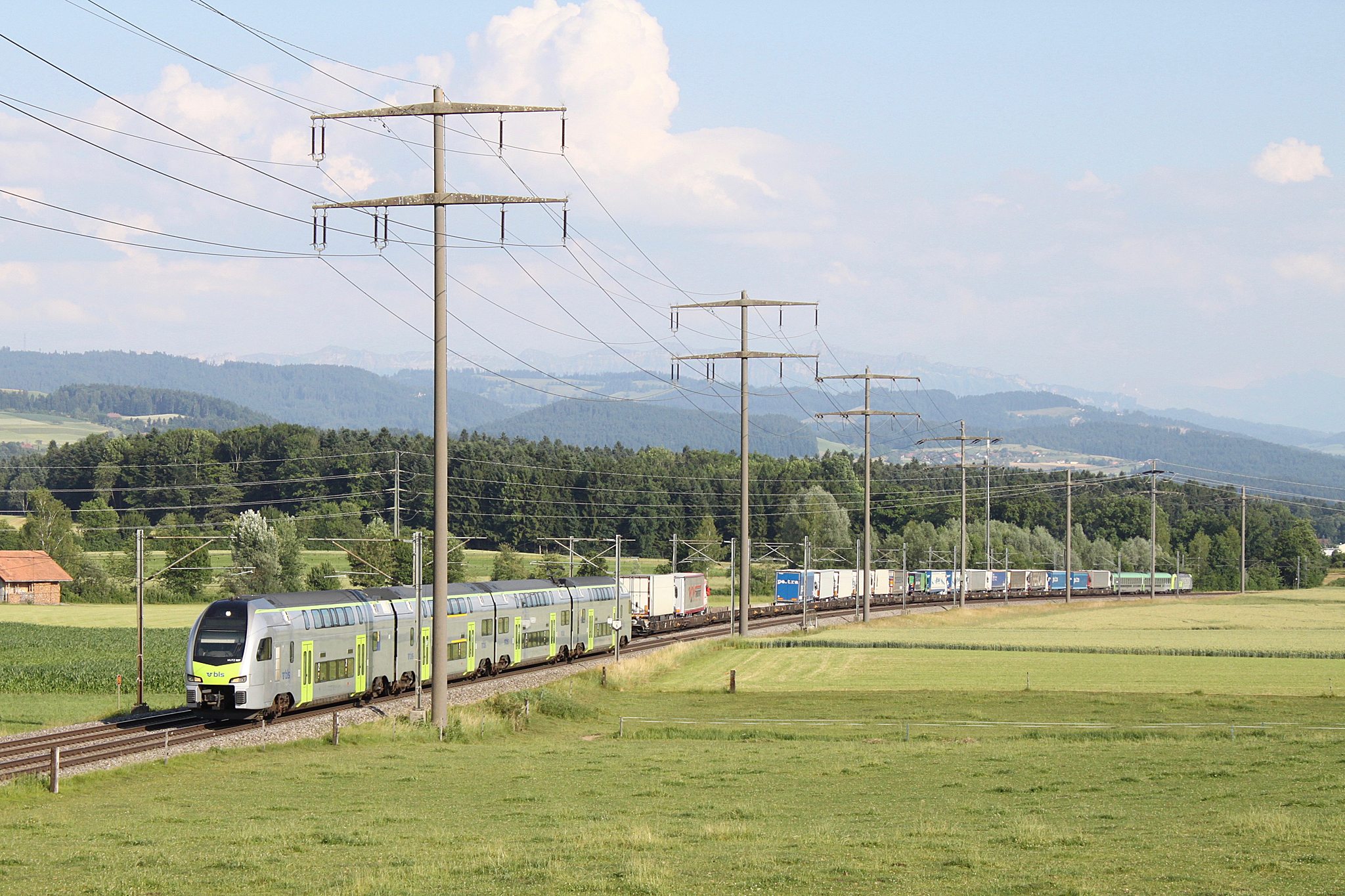
- BLS RABe 515 near Allmendingen bei Bern in 2017

Overview
- First service: 28 May 1995
- Current operator(s): BLS AG
- Former operator(s): Swiss Federal Railways (1995–2005); BLS Lötschbergbahn (2005–2006)

Route
- Termini: Fribourg/Freiburg; Thun
- Stops: 20
- Distance travelled: 63 km (39 mi)
- Average journey time: 1 hour 4 minutes
- Service frequency: Every 30 minutes
- Line(s) used: Lausanne–Bern; Bern–Thun

Technical
- Rolling stock: BLS RABe 515

The S1 is a railway service of the Bern S-Bahn that provides half-hourly service between Fribourg/Freiburg and Thun via Bern. BLS AG, a private company primarily owned by the federal government and the canton of Bern, operates the service. The S1 is the oldest of the Bern S-Bahn routes, tracing its roots back to 1987.

== Operations ==
The S1 operates every half hour between Fribourg/Freiburg and Thun via Bern. In Fribourg, the S1 makes a connection with the IC 1 or IR 15 for Lausanne. In Thun, the S1 makes a connection with the IC 6 or IC 8 for Spiez and Brig. The S1 is joined between Flamatt and Gümligen by the S2, for a total of four trains per hour between those stops. The S2 makes local stops between Thörishaus Dorf and Niederwangen, which the S1 skips. As of 2022, most services are operated by BLS RABe 515 multiple units.

== History ==
Swiss Federal Railways (SBB) had run trains on a half-hourly schedule over the Lausanne–Bern and Bern–Thun railway lines since 1987. Trains ran between Thun and Flamatt every 30 minutes, continuing to either Laupen BE or Fribourg. The service gained the designation "S1" on 28 May 1995 when the S2 began operating.

The S1 has continued relatively unchanged since then. The Bern-Lötschberg-Simplon-Bahn (BLS) assumed operation from the SBB in December 2004, and the S11 began running as a rush-hour supplement between Bern and Fribourg. Beginning in December 2008, the S11 was eliminated, and the S1 ceased serving Laupen BE: all trains continued to Fribourg on a half-hourly schedule. The re-routed S2 took over service between Flamatt and Laupen BE.
