= Heimberg railway station =

Railway station in Heimberg, Switzerland

Heimberg
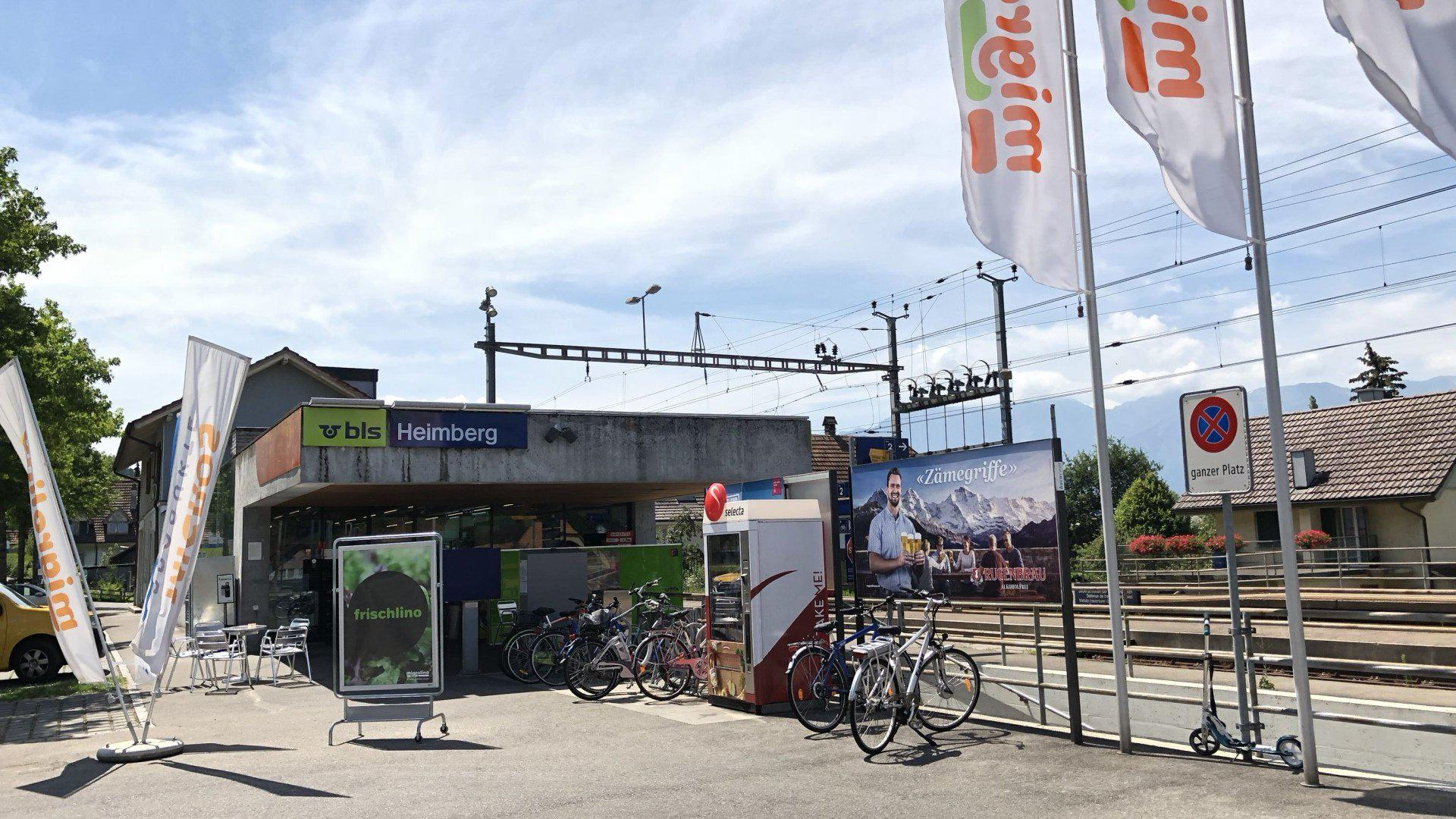
- The station in 2018 before the overhaul

General information
- Location: Heimberg; Switzerland
- Coordinates: 46°47′27″N 7°36′22″E
- Elevation: 552 m (1,811 ft)
- Owner: BLS AG
- Line: Burgdorf–Thun line
- Distance: 29.4 km (18.3 mi) from Hasle-Rüegsau
- Platforms: 2 side platforms
- Tracks: 2
- Train operators: BLS AG
- Connections: STI Bus AG bus line

Construction
- Parking: Yes (20 spaces)
- Accessible: Yes

Other information
- Station code: 8508253 (HMB)
- Fare zone: 701 (Libero)

History
- Rebuilt: January 2023 - December 2024

Passengers
- 2023: 660 per weekday (BLS)

Services
Preceding station	Bern S-Bahn	Following station
Lädeli towards Thun	S21	Brenzikofen towards Konolfingen
Lädeli towards Thun	S41	Oberdiessbach towards Solothurn
Lädeli towards Thun	S42	Brenzikofen towards Hasle-Rüegsau
Location

Heimberg railway station (German: Bahnhof Heimberg) is a railway station in the municipality of Heimberg, in the Swiss canton of Bern. It is located on the standard gauge Burgdorf–Thun line of BLS AG.

== Services ==
As of the December 2024 timetable change, the following services stop at Heimberg:

- Bern S-Bahn S21 / S41 / S42: three trains per hour between Thun and Konolfingen, from Konolfingen, half-hourly service to Hasle-Rüegsau, with every other train continuing to Solothurn.
