= Lädeli railway station =

Railway station in Heimberg, Switzerland

Lädeli
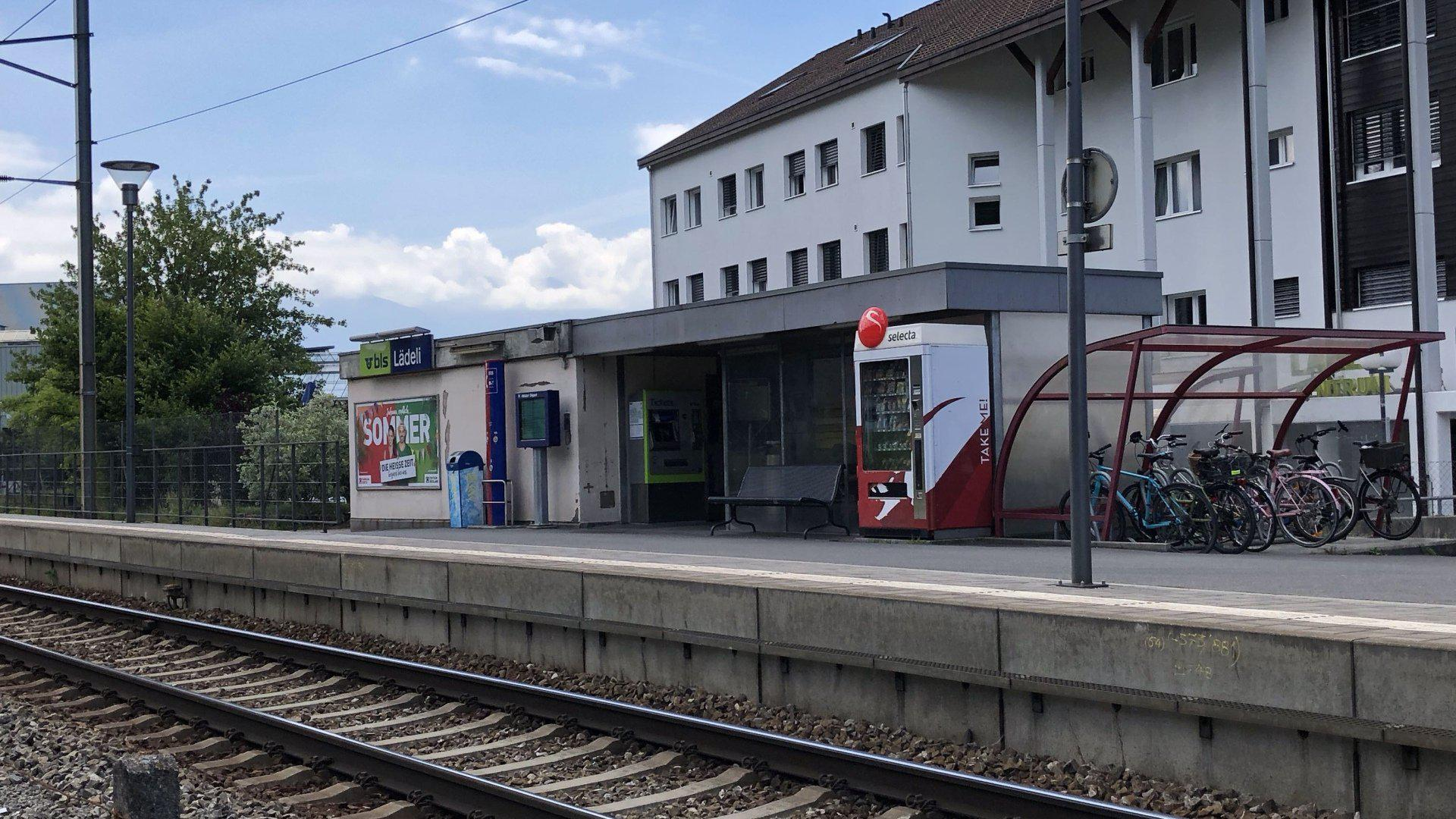
- The station in 2018

General information
- Location: Heimberg; Switzerland
- Coordinates: 46°46′54″N 7°36′33″E
- Elevation: 553 m (1,814 ft)
- Owner: BLS AG
- Line: Burgdorf–Thun line
- Distance: 30.3 km (18.8 mi) from Hasle-Rüegsau
- Platforms: 1 side platform
- Tracks: 1
- Train operators: BLS AG
- Connections: STI Bus AG buses

Construction
- Accessible: Yes

Other information
- Station code: 8508252 (LAED)
- Fare zone: 701 (Libero)

Passengers
- 2023: 840 per weekday (BLS)

Services
| Preceding station | Bern S-Bahn | Following station |
|---|---|---|
| Steffisburg towards Thun | S21 | Heimberg towards Konolfingen |
| Steffisburg towards Thun | S41 | Heimberg towards Solothurn |
| Steffisburg towards Thun | S42 | Heimberg towards Hasle-Rüegsau |
Location

Lädeli railway station (German: Bahnhof Lädeli) is a railway station in the municipality of Heimberg, in the Swiss canton of Bern. It is located on the standard gauge Burgdorf–Thun line of BLS AG.

== Services ==
As of the December 2024 timetable change, the following services stop at Lädeli:

- Bern S-Bahn: S21 / S41 / S42 : three trains per hour between Thun and Konolfingen, from Konolfingen, half-hourly service to Hasle-Rüegsau, with every other train continuing to Solothurn.
