= Oberdiessbach railway station =

Railway station in Oberdiessbach, Switzerland

Oberdiessbach
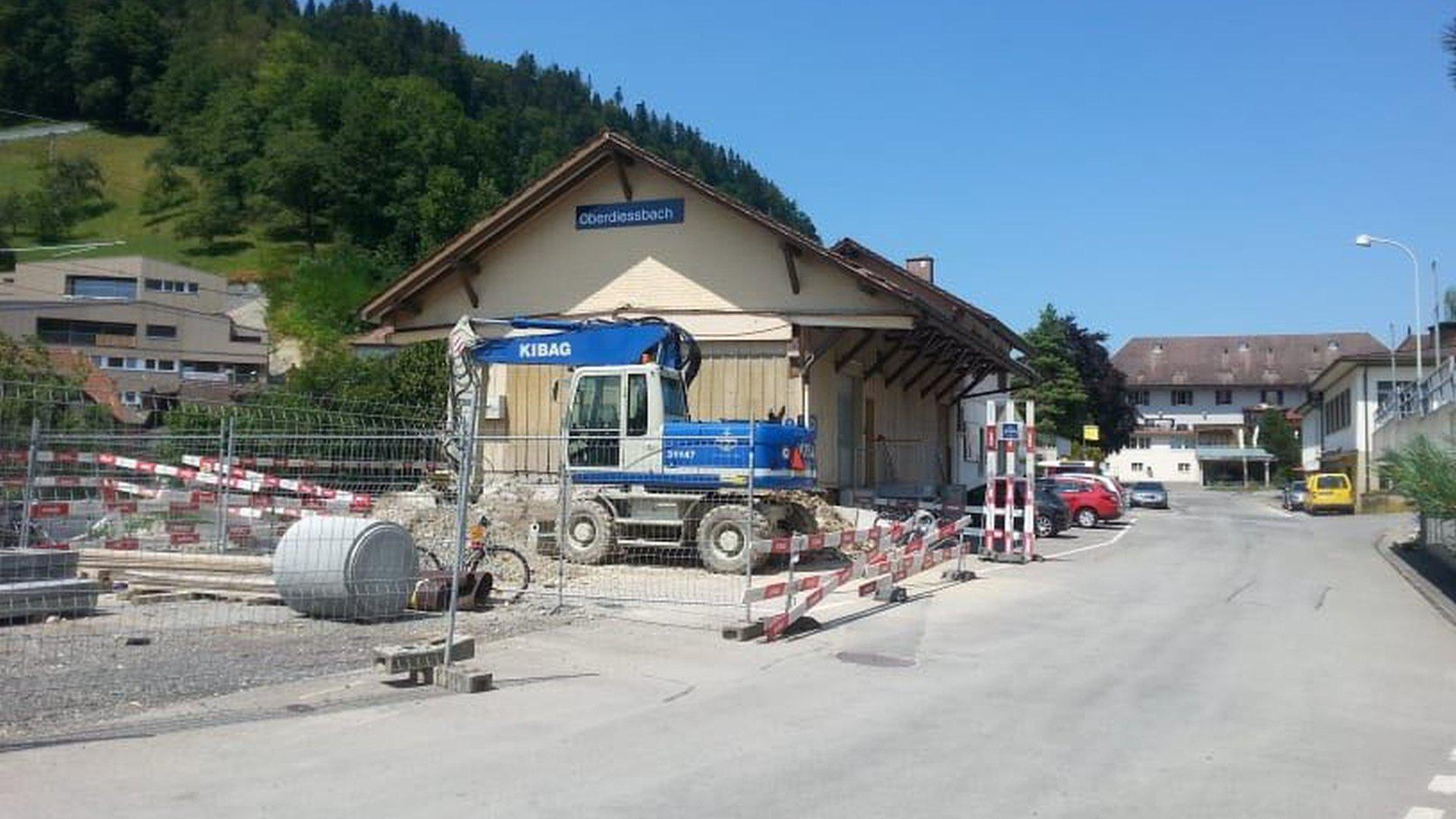
- The station building in 2018

General information
- Location: Oberdiessbach; Switzerland
- Coordinates: 46°50′21″N 7°37′04″E
- Elevation: 604 m (1,982 ft)
- Owner: BLS AG
- Line: Burgdorf–Thun line
- Distance: 23.7 km (14.7 mi) from Hasle-Rüegsau
- Platforms: 2 side platforms
- Tracks: 2
- Train operators: BLS AG
- Connections: BERNMOBIL bus line; STI Bus AG bus line

Construction
- Parking: Yes (18 spaces)
- Accessible: Yes

Other information
- Station code: 8508255 (OD)
- Fare zone: 711 (Libero)

Passengers
- 2023: 1'100 per weekday (BLS)

Services
Preceding station	Bern S-Bahn	Following station
Brenzikofen towards Thun	S21	Stalden i.E. towards Konolfingen
Heimberg towards Thun	S41	Konolfingen towards Solothurn
Brenzikofen towards Thun	S42	Stalden i.E. towards Hasle-Rüegsau
Location

Oberdiessbach railway station (German: Bahnhof Oberdiessbach) is a railway station in the municipality of Oberdiessbach, in the Swiss canton of Bern. It is located on the standard gauge Burgdorf–Thun line of BLS AG.

== Services ==
As of the December 2024 timetable change, the following services stop at Oberdiessbach:

- Bern S-Bahn S21 / S41 / S42: three trains per hour between Thun and Konolfingen, from Konolfingen, half-hourly service to Hasle-Rüegsau, with every other train continuing to Solothurn.
