= Brenzikofen railway station =

Railway station in Brenzikofen, Switzerland

Brenzikofen
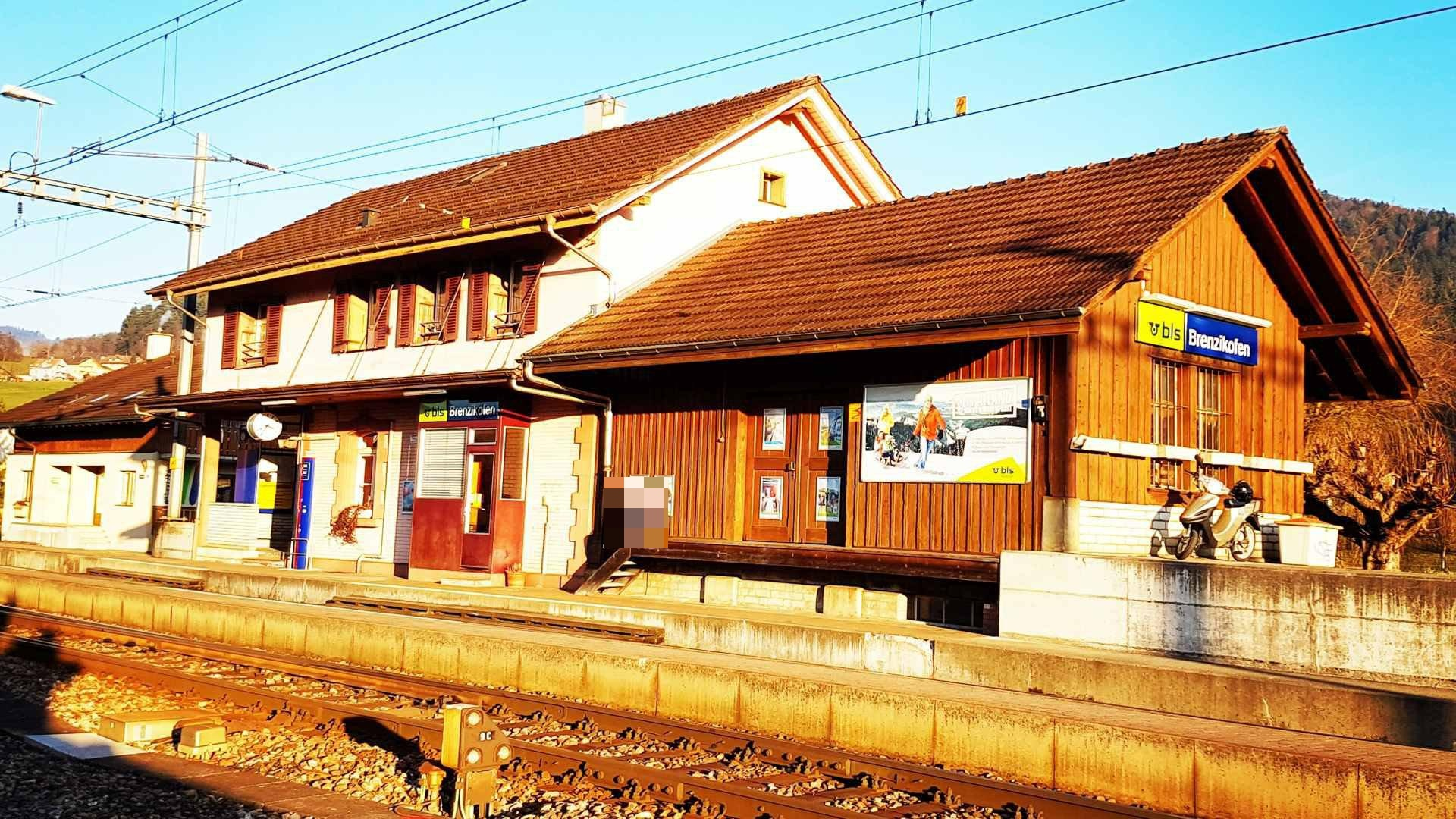
- The station building in 2016

General information
- Location: Brenzikofen; Switzerland
- Coordinates: 46°49′06″N 7°36′39″E
- Elevation: 577 m (1,893 ft)
- Owner: BLS AG
- Line: Burgdorf–Thun line
- Distance: 26.1 km (16.2 mi) from Hasle-Rüegsau
- Platforms: 1 side platform
- Tracks: 3
- Train operators: BLS AG

Construction
- Parking: Yes (10 spaces)
- Accessible: Yes

Other information
- Station code: 8508254 (BK)
- Fare zone: 701 and 711 (Libero)

Passengers
- 2023: 140 per weekday (BLS)

Services
Preceding station	Bern S-Bahn	Following station
Heimberg towards Thun	S21	Oberdiessbach towards Konolfingen
Heimberg towards Thun	S42	Oberdiessbach towards Hasle-Rüegsau
Location

Brenzikofen railway station (German: Bahnhof Brenzikofen) is a railway station in the municipality of Brenzikofen, in the Swiss canton of Bern. It is located on the standard gauge Burgdorf–Thun line of BLS AG. This station is served as a request stop by local trains only.

== Services ==
As of the December 2024 timetable change, the following services stop at Brenzikofen:

- Bern S-Bahn S21 / S42: two per hour between Thun and Konolfingen, with every other train continuing from Konolfingen to Hasle-Rüegsau.
