= Worb railway station =

Worb railway station could refer to two stations in Worb, Switzerland:

- Worb Dorf railway station
- Worb SBB railway station
