= Schwäbis railway station =

Railway station in Steffisburg, Switzerland

Schwäbis
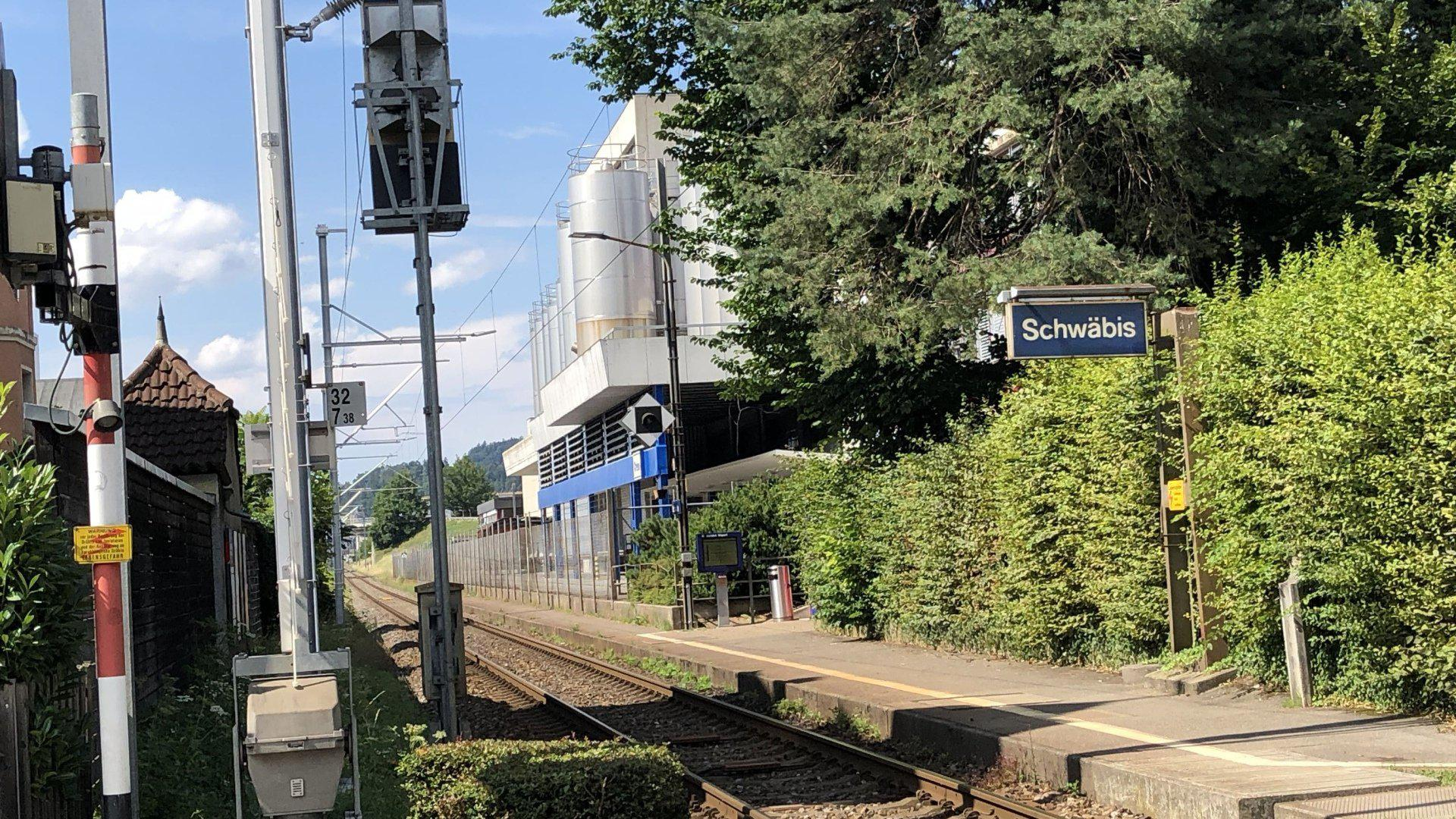
- The station platform in 2018 before the overhaul

General information
- Location: Steffisburg; Switzerland
- Coordinates: 46°45′46″N 7°37′09″E
- Elevation: 556 m (1,824 ft)
- Owner: BLS AG
- Line: Burgdorf–Thun line
- Distance: 32.7 km (20.3 mi) from Hasle-Rüegsau
- Platforms: 1 side platform
- Tracks: 1
- Train operators: BLS AG
- Connections: STI Bus AG bus line

Construction
- Parking: Yes
- Accessible: Yes

Other information
- Station code: 8508250 (SWB)
- Fare zone: 700 (Libero)

Passengers
- 2023: 120 per weekday (BLS)

Services
Preceding station	Bern S-Bahn	Following station
Steffisburg towards Hasle-Rüegsau	S42	Thun Terminus
Location

Schwäbis railway station (German: Bahnhof Schwäbis) is a railway station in the municipality of Steffisburg, in the Swiss canton of Bern. It is located on the standard gauge Burgdorf–Thun line of BLS AG.

== History ==
Between 2023 and 2024, the station was overhauled to be accessible in accordance with the Swiss Disability Discrimination Act.

== Services ==
As of the December 2024 timetable change, the following services stop at Schwäbis:

- Bern S-Bahn S42: hourly service between Thun and Hasle-Rüegsau.
