= Steffisburg railway station =

Railway station in Steffisburg, Switzerland

Steffisburg
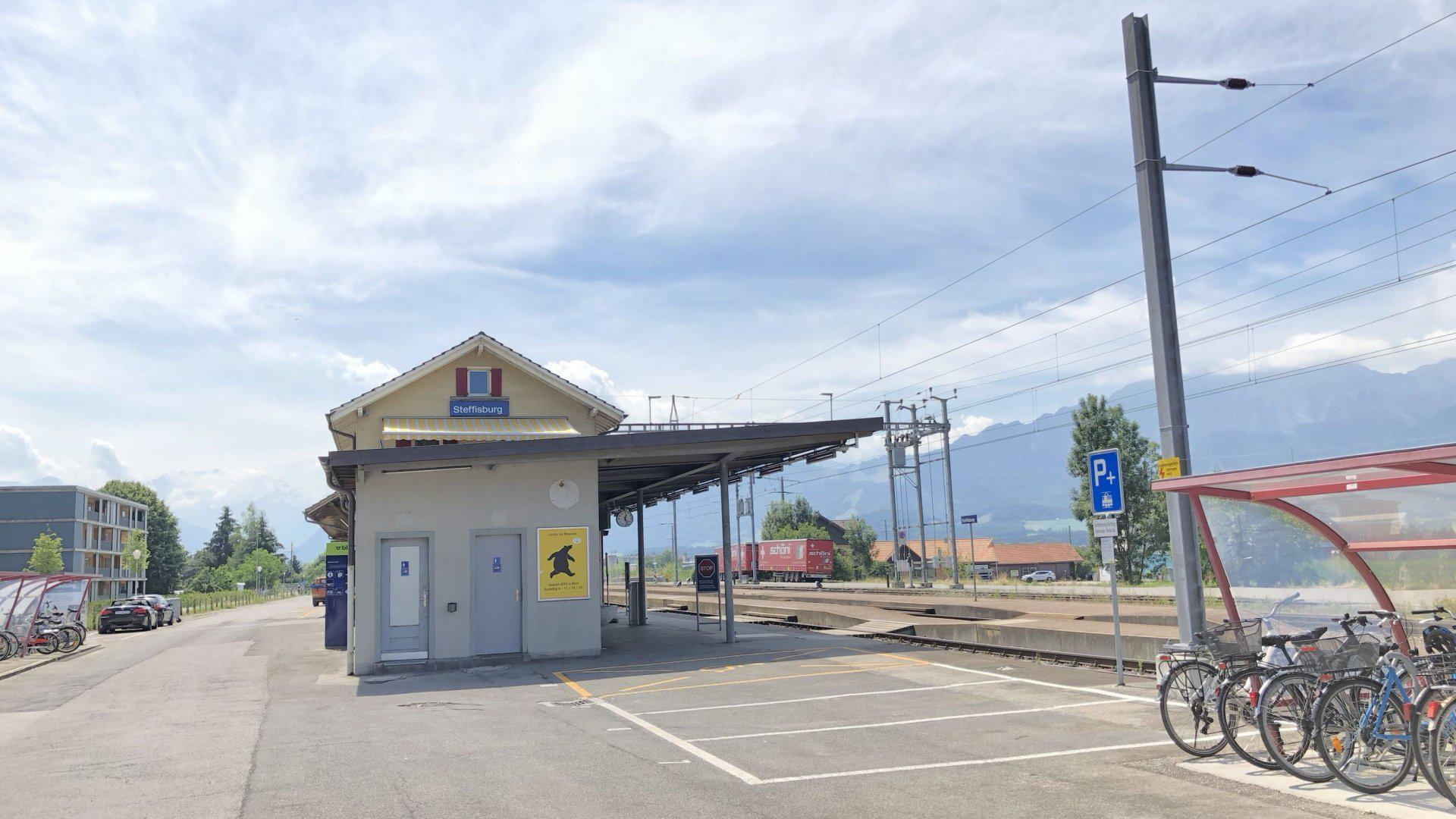
- The station in 2018

General information
- Location: Steffisburg; Switzerland
- Coordinates: 46°46′23″N 7°36′55″E
- Elevation: 563 m (1,847 ft)
- Owner: BLS AG
- Line: Burgdorf–Thun line
- Distance: 31.5 km (19.6 mi) from Hasle-Rüegsau
- Platforms: 2 side platforms
- Tracks: 2
- Train operators: BLS AG

Construction
- Parking: Yes (12 spaces)
- Accessible: Yes

Other information
- Station code: 8508251 (STEF)
- Fare zone: 700 (Libero)

History
- Rebuilt: February 2023 - August 2024

Passengers
- 2023: 390 per weekday (BLS)

Services
Preceding station	Bern S-Bahn	Following station
Thun Terminus	S21	Lädeli towards Konolfingen
Thun Terminus	S41	Lädeli towards Solothurn
Schwäbis towards Thun	S42	Lädeli towards Hasle-Rüegsau
Location

Steffisburg railway station (German: Bahnhof Steffisburg) is a railway station in the municipality of Steffisburg, in the Swiss canton of Bern. It is located on the standard gauge Burgdorf–Thun line of BLS AG.

== Services ==
As of the December 2024 timetable change, the following services stop at Steffisburg:

- Bern S-Bahn: S21 / S41 / S42 : three trains per hour between Thun and Konolfingen, from Konolfingen, half-hourly service to Hasle-Rüegsau, with every other train continuing to Solothurn.
