= Thunersee–Beatenberg Funicular =

Funicular railway in the canton of Bern, Switzerland

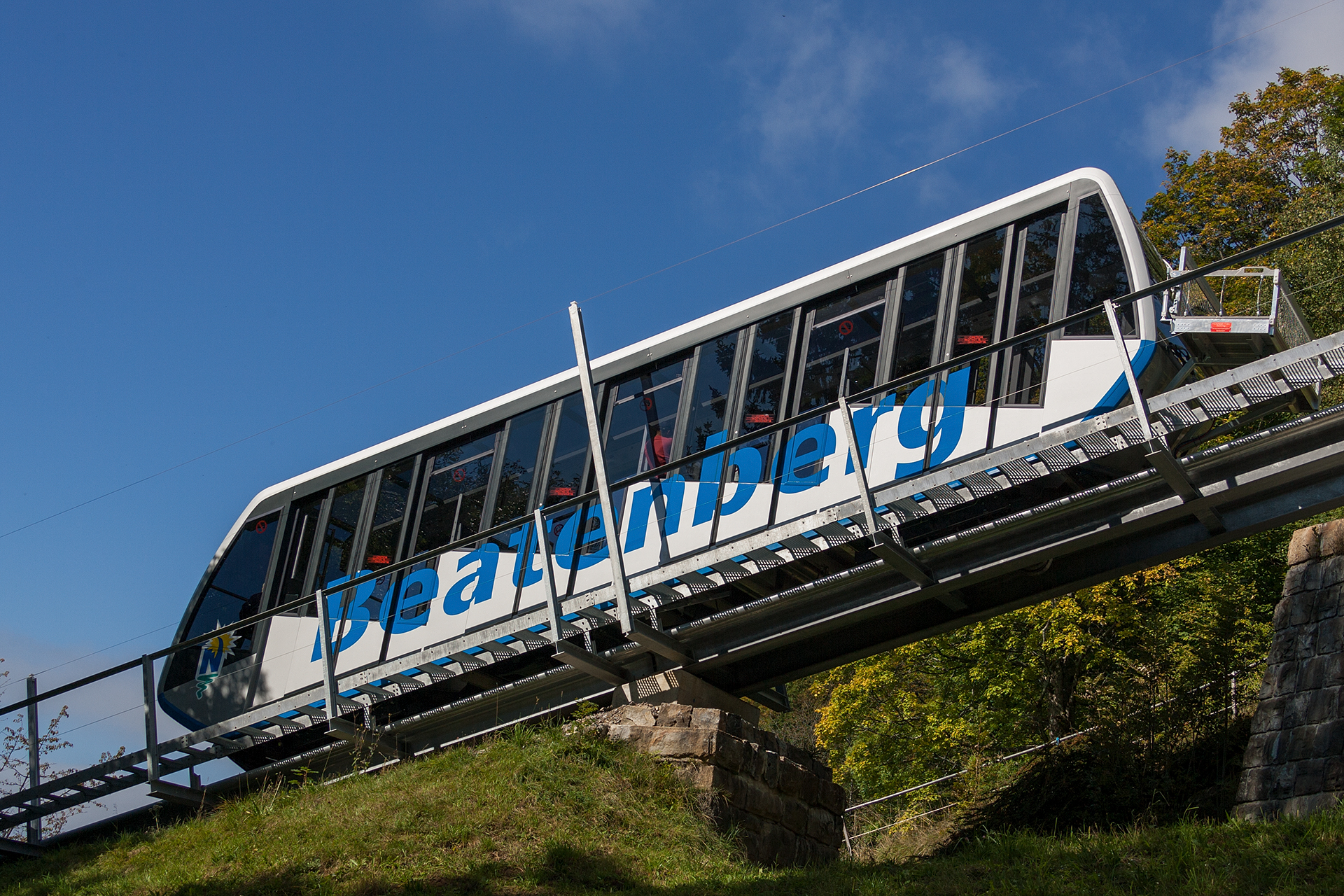
- car (2005)

Overview
- Other name(s): Drahtseilbahn Thunersee-Beatenberg, Beatenbergbahn, Drahtseilbahn Thunersee-St. Beatenberg
- Status: In operation
- Owner: Niederhornbahn AG (since 2014); Previous names: Drahtseilbahn Thunersee-St. Beatenberg (1889–1906), Drahtseilbahn Thunersee-St. Beatenberg (Beatenberbahn) (1906–1947), Drahtseilbahn Thunersee-Beatenberg (Beatenbergbahn) (1947–2010); Beatenbergbahn AG (2010–2014)
- Coordinates: 46.6863°N 7.7590°E
- Termini: "Beatenbucht (Beatenbergbahn)"; Beatenberg
- Stations: 3 (including Birchi)
- Website: niederhorn.ch

Service
- Type: Funicular
- Operator(s): Verkehrsbetriebe STI
- Rolling stock: 2 for 90 passengers each

History
- Opened: 21 June 1889 (136 years ago)
- Concession: 1887, 1967

Technical
- Line length: 1,689 metres (5,541 ft)
- Number of tracks: 1 with passing loop
- Track gauge: 1,200 mm (3 ft 11 1/4 in)
- Electrification: 1911 (water counterbalancing before)
- Operating speed: 4.8 metres per second (16 ft/s)
- Highest elevation: 1,120 m (3,670 ft)
- Maximum incline: 40%

The Thunersee–Beatenberg Funicular (German: Thunersee–Beatenberg Bahn; TBB) is a funicular in the canton of Bern, Switzerland. It links a jetty, at Beatenbucht in the municipality of Sigriswil and on the shores of Lake Thun, to the village of Beatenberg, situated on the plateau above at 1,120 metres (3,675 ft) above sea level.

At Beatenbucht, the funicular connects with shipping services, run by BLS AG, and bus services, run by Verkehrsbetriebe STI. Both shipping and bus services connect Beatenbucht to Interlaken and Thun. At Beatenberg, the funicular connects with the Seilbahnen Beatenberg-Niederhorn, a gondola lift which runs to the summit of the Niederhorn.

== History ==
The funicular was built in 1888 and 1889, and opened on 21 June 1889, by the Drahtseilbahn Thunersee–Beatenberg company. The funicular was converted to electric operation in 1911, and the following year it commenced year round operation. The onward connection to the summit of the Niederhorn by cable car was first opened, by a separate company, in 1946.

The line was completely reconstructed between October 2004 and July 2005, and new modern style cars were provided. In 2014, the funicular and cable car companies were merged, to create the current Niederhornbahn AG company. In the autumn of 2016, a new motor and electronic control system was installed.

Previous company names:

- 1889–1906: Drahtseilbahn Thunersee-St. Beatenberg
- 1906–1947: Drahtseilbahn Thunersee-St. Beatenberg (Beatenberbahn)
- 1947–2010: Drahtseilbahn Thunersee-Beatenberg (Beatenbergbahn)
- 2010–2014: Beatenbergbahn AG

== Operation ==
The funicular has a length of 1,689 metres (5,541 ft) and overcomes a vertical distance of 556 metres (1,824 ft) with an average gradient of 34.6% and a maximum of 40%. The line comprises a single track of 1,200 mm (3 ft 11 1/4 in) gauge with a central passing loop. There is one intermediate stop, at Birchi.

The two modern style cars each accommodate 90 passengers and operate at either 3.2 metres per second (10 ft/s) or 4.8 metres per second (16 ft/s), depending on demand. The journey time is either 10 or 6 minutes, depending on the speed selected, with cars operating every 20 minutes or more frequently. The line has a theoretical maximum capacity of 700 people per hour.

The line is owned by the Niederhornbahn AG and managed by the Verkehrsbetriebe STI.

== See also ==
- List of funicular railways
- List of funiculars in Switzerland

== Gallery ==
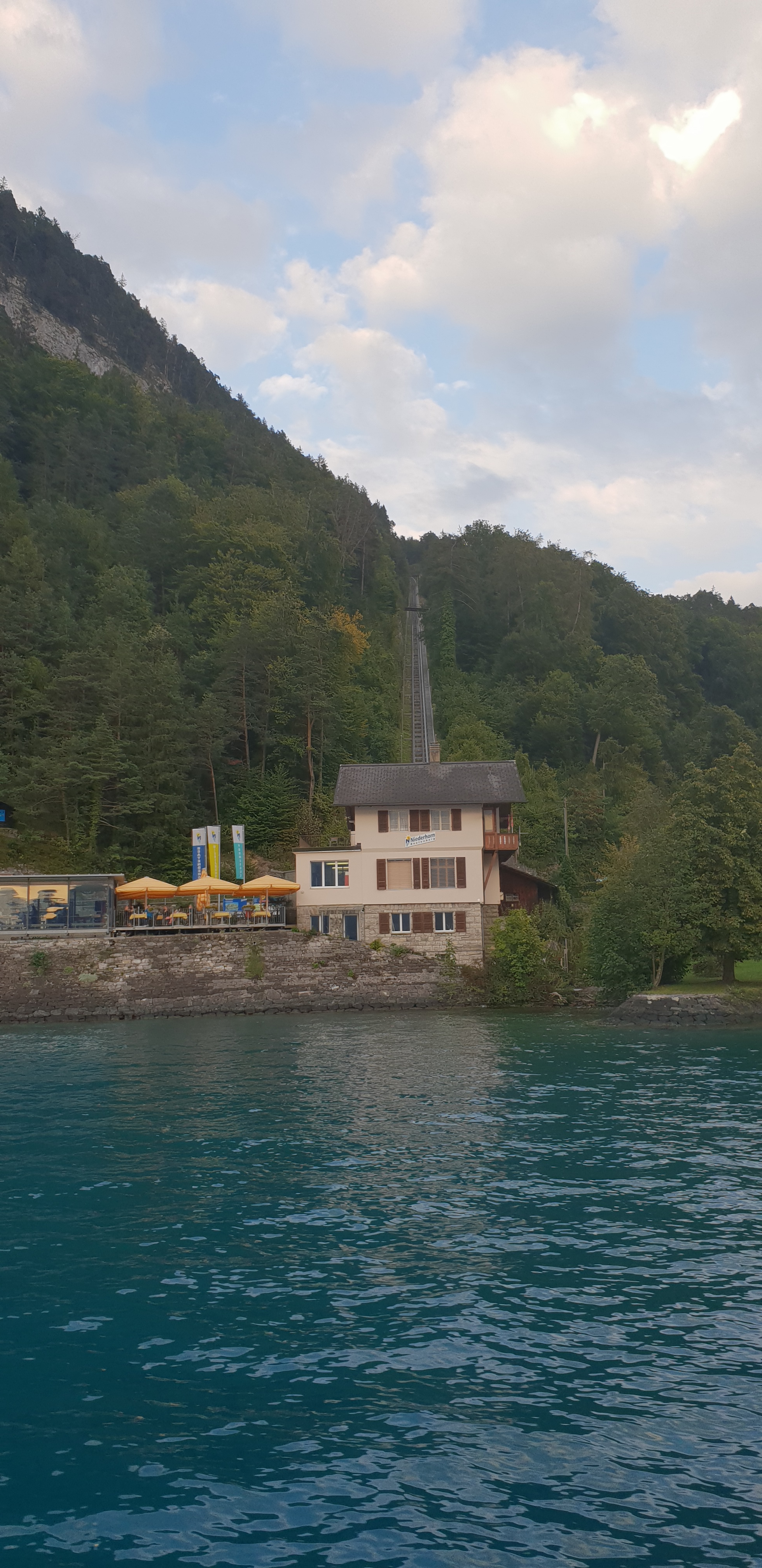
lower station seen from the lake (2018)

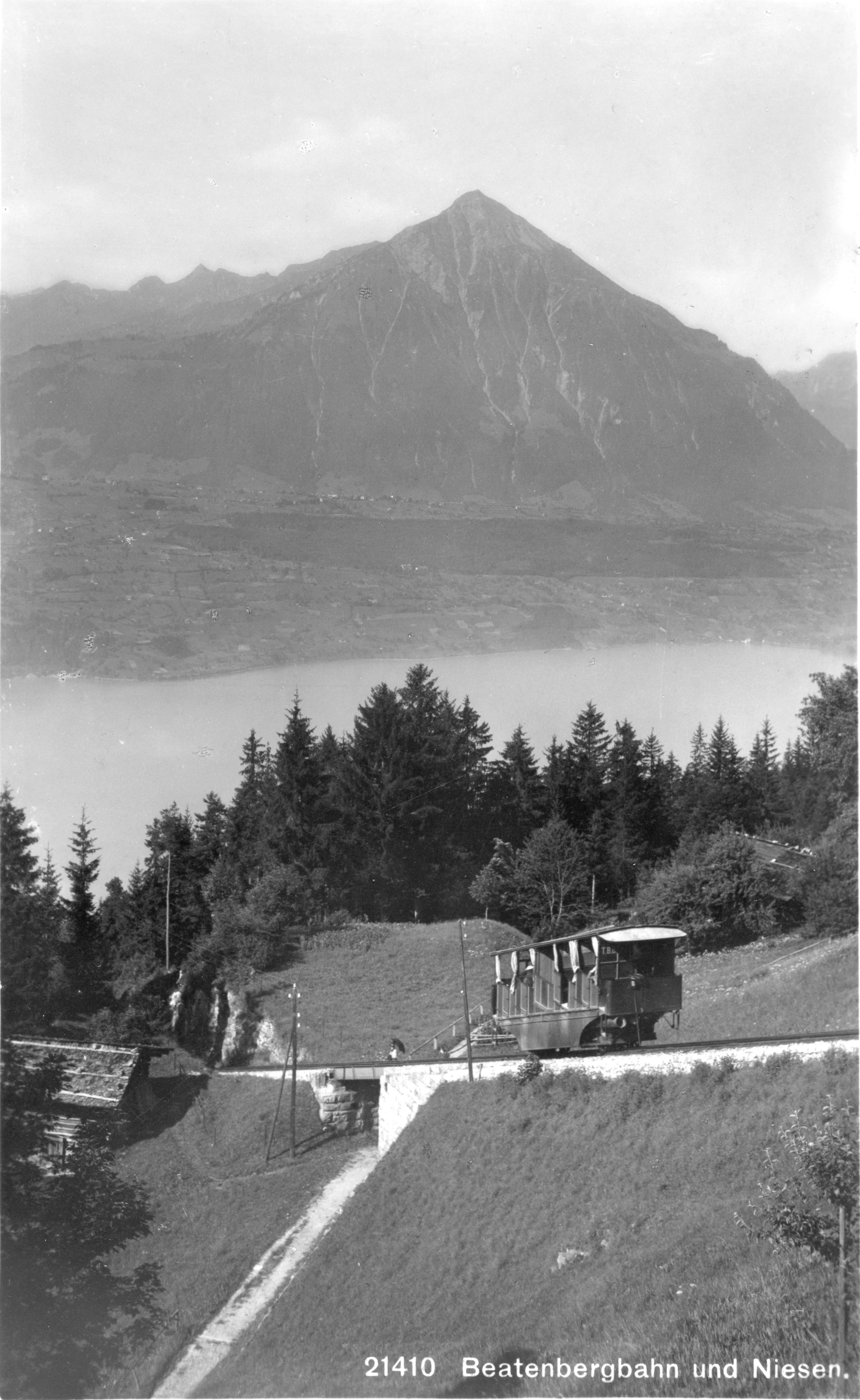
Funicular with Niesen in the background (postcard sent 1933)

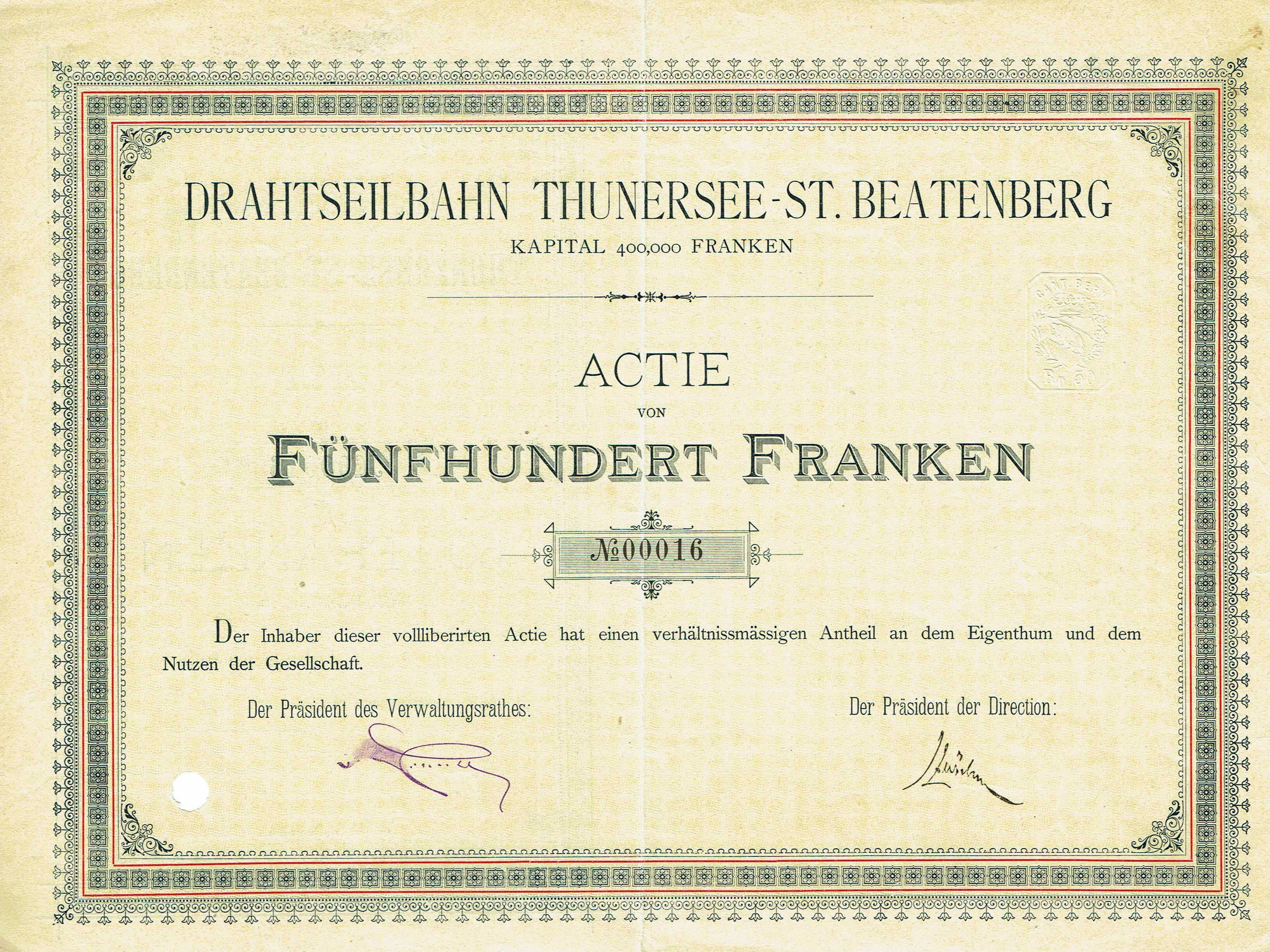
share certificate of 1889 for Drahtseilbahn Thunersee-St.Beatenberg
