= Niederhorn =

Mountain in Switzerland

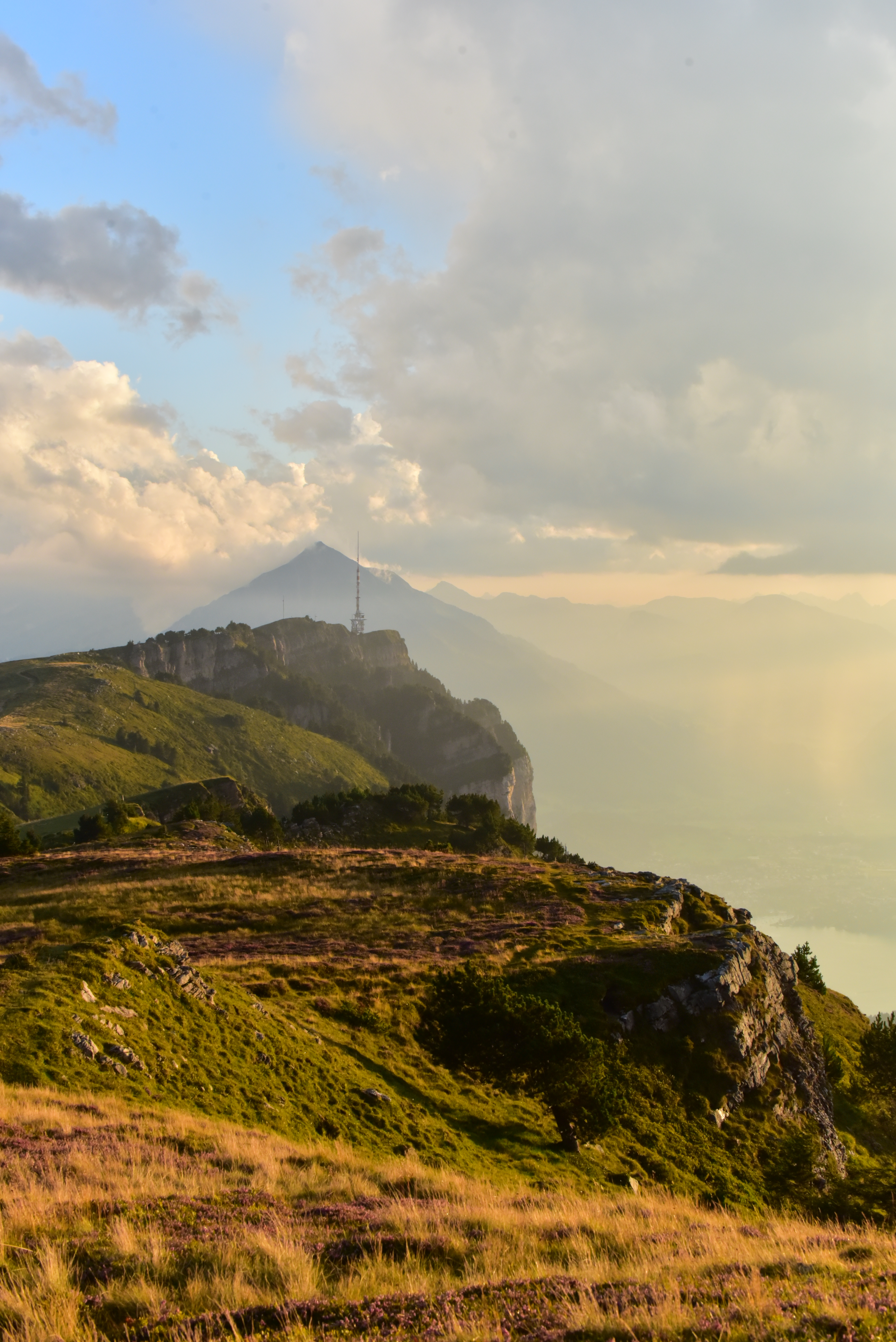
- View from the Güggisgrat (north-east side)

Highest point
- Elevation: 1,963 m (6,440 ft)
- Prominence: 45 m (148 ft)
- Parent peak: Burgfeldstand
- Isolation: 1.2 km (0.75 mi)
- Coordinates: 46°42′39″N 7°46′24″E

Geography
- Location within Switzerland
- Location: Bernese Oberland, Switzerland
- Parent range: Emmental Alps

The Niederhorn (elevation 1963 metres) is a peak of the Emmental Alps in the Bernese Oberland near Beatenberg. It is the peak farthest west in the Güggis ridge. From its summit Lake Thun and the entire Bernese Alps can be seen.

An aerial cable car to the summit was completed in 1946 with a restaurant and children's playground at the top. Today the summit can be reached by the Seilbahnen Beatenberg-Niederhorn, a more modern gondola lift that runs from the village of Beatenberg, where it connects with the Thunersee–Beatenberg Bahn, a funicular with connections to the shipping services on Lake Thun.

A 89 metres (292 ft) high steel lattice antenna tower was built near the restaurant in 1975. It broadcasts FM radio and television.

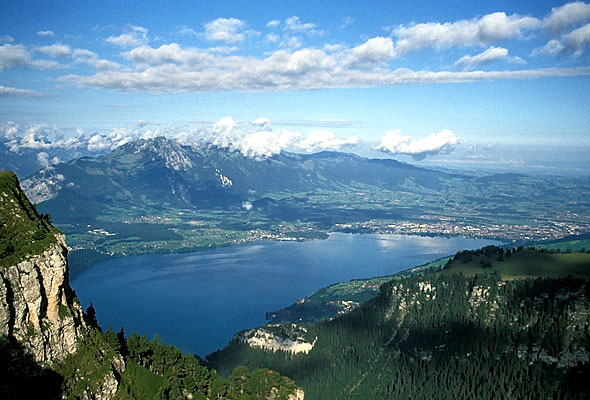
View of Thun and Lake Thun from the Niederhorn

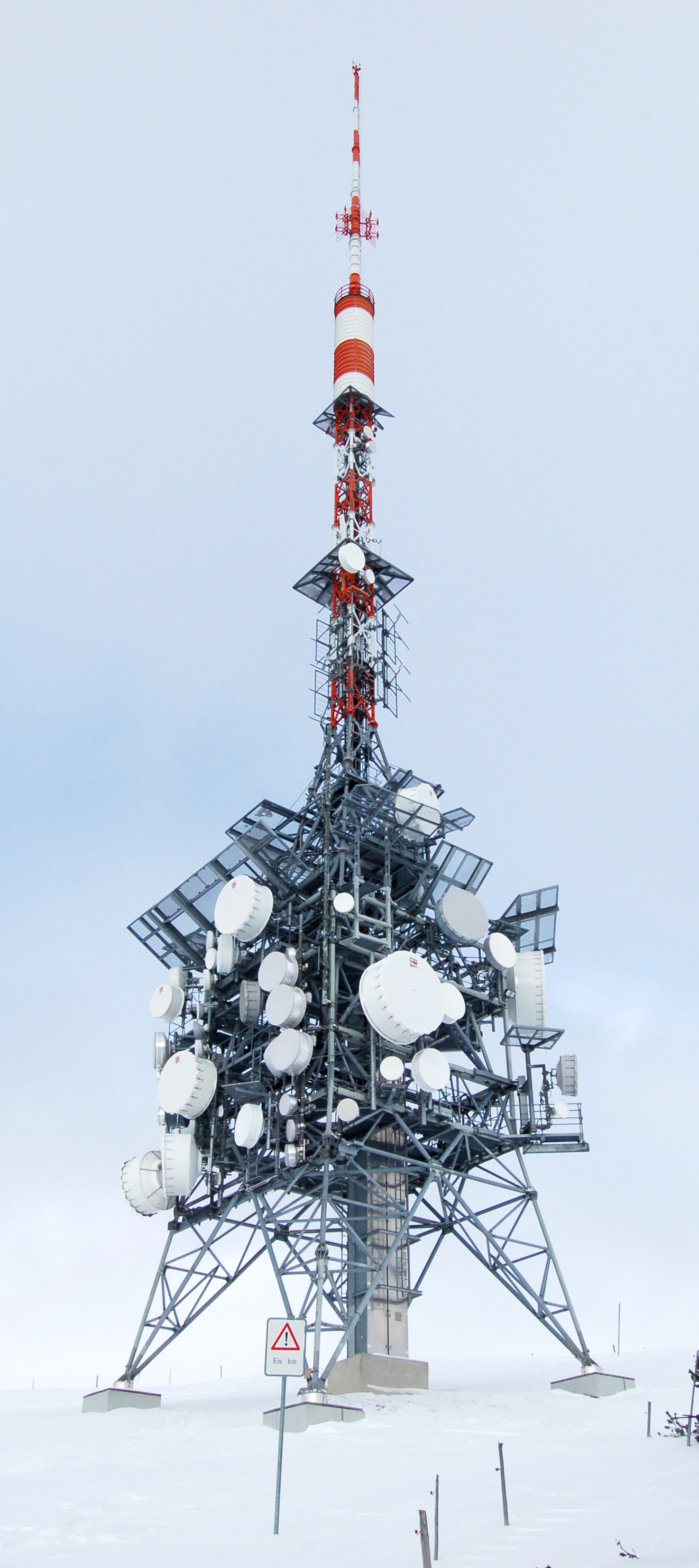
Antenna tower on the Niederhorn

== Fauna ==
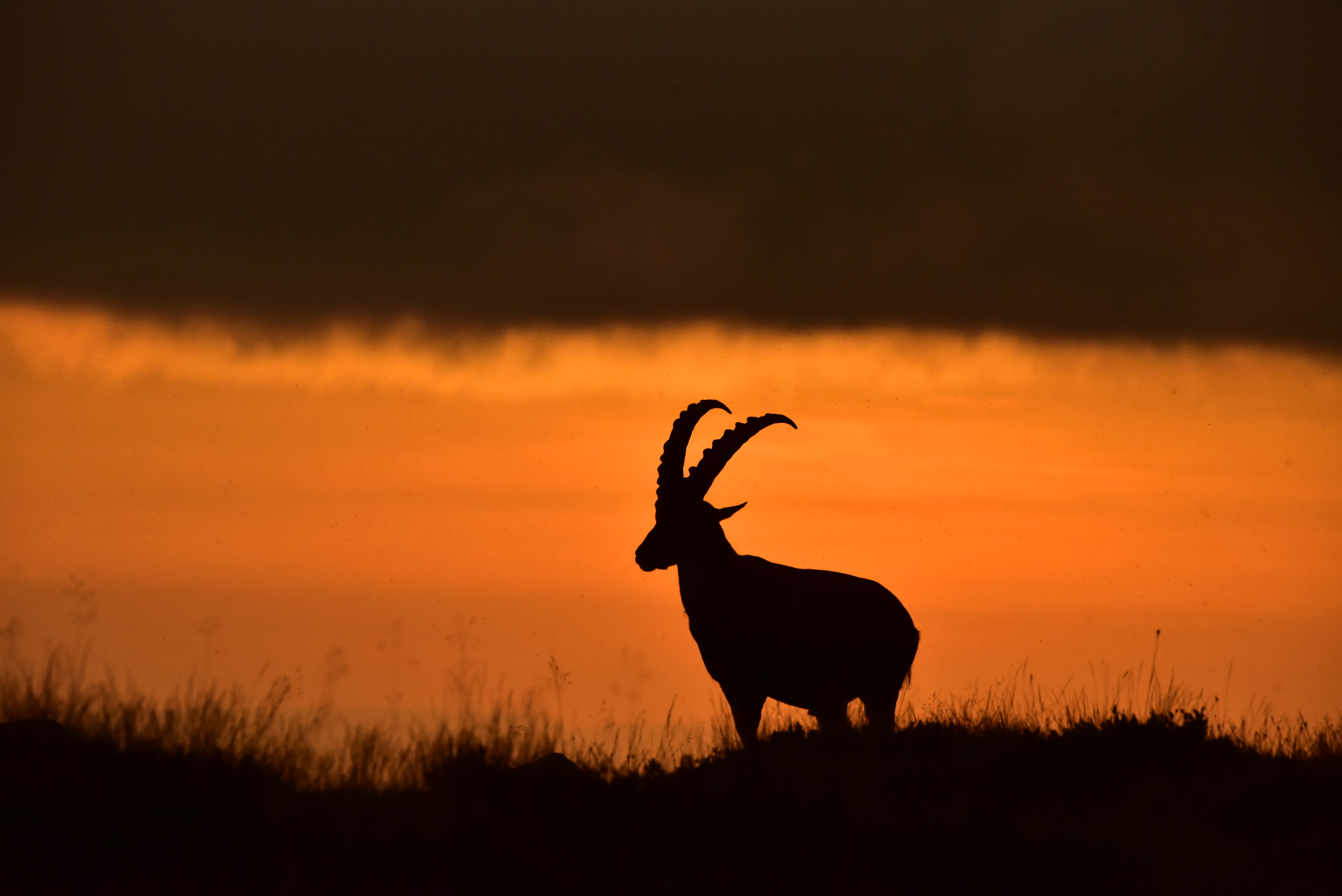
A six-year-old male ibex near Burgfeldstand.

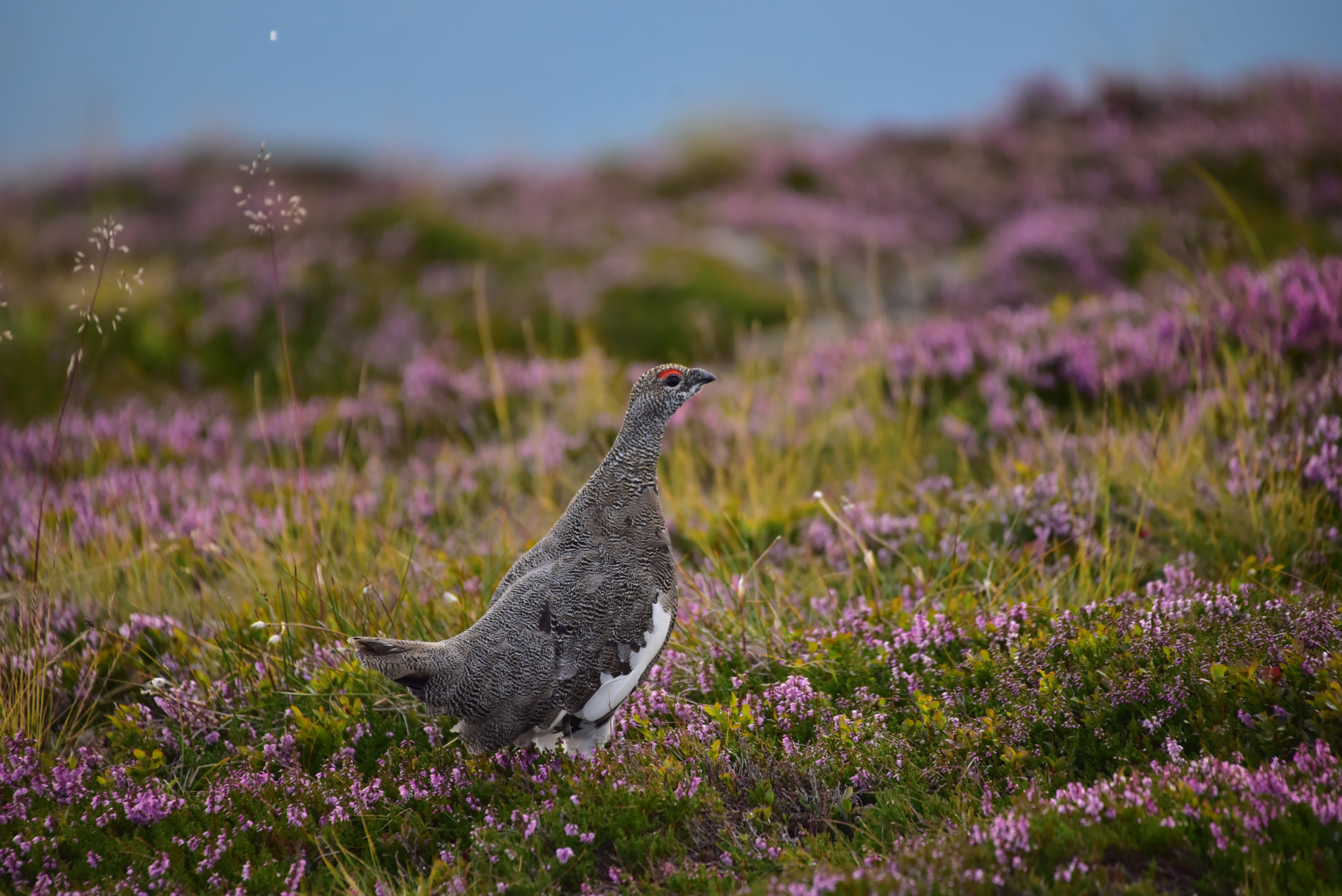
Ptarmigan in late summer on the ridge of the Niederhorn.

The Niederhorn area is a popular destination for wildlife photographers to photograph the alpine fauna. The Niederhorn is particularly well known for the ibex population that stays around the ridge in the summer months. This ibex colony was established in 1949 with the release of three bucks from the Augstmatthorn colony. Over the next eight years, a total of 26 animals were released. In recent years, the population fluctuates between 75 and 100 animals (as of 2018).

From the end of September to mid-October, the red deer gather north of the Niederhorn in the Justistal during the mating season. The roaring of the male deer can be heard clearly from the Niederhorn.

A pair of golden eagles has a hunting area of about 40km2 which includes the Justistal, the Sigriswilergrat and the Güggisgrat.

There are also snow hares, black grouse, rock partridges, ptarmigans, red foxes, chamois and also lynx.

== See also ==
- List of mountains of Switzerland accessible by public transport
