= Stalden i.E. railway station =

Railway station in Konolfingen, Switzerland

Stalden i.E.
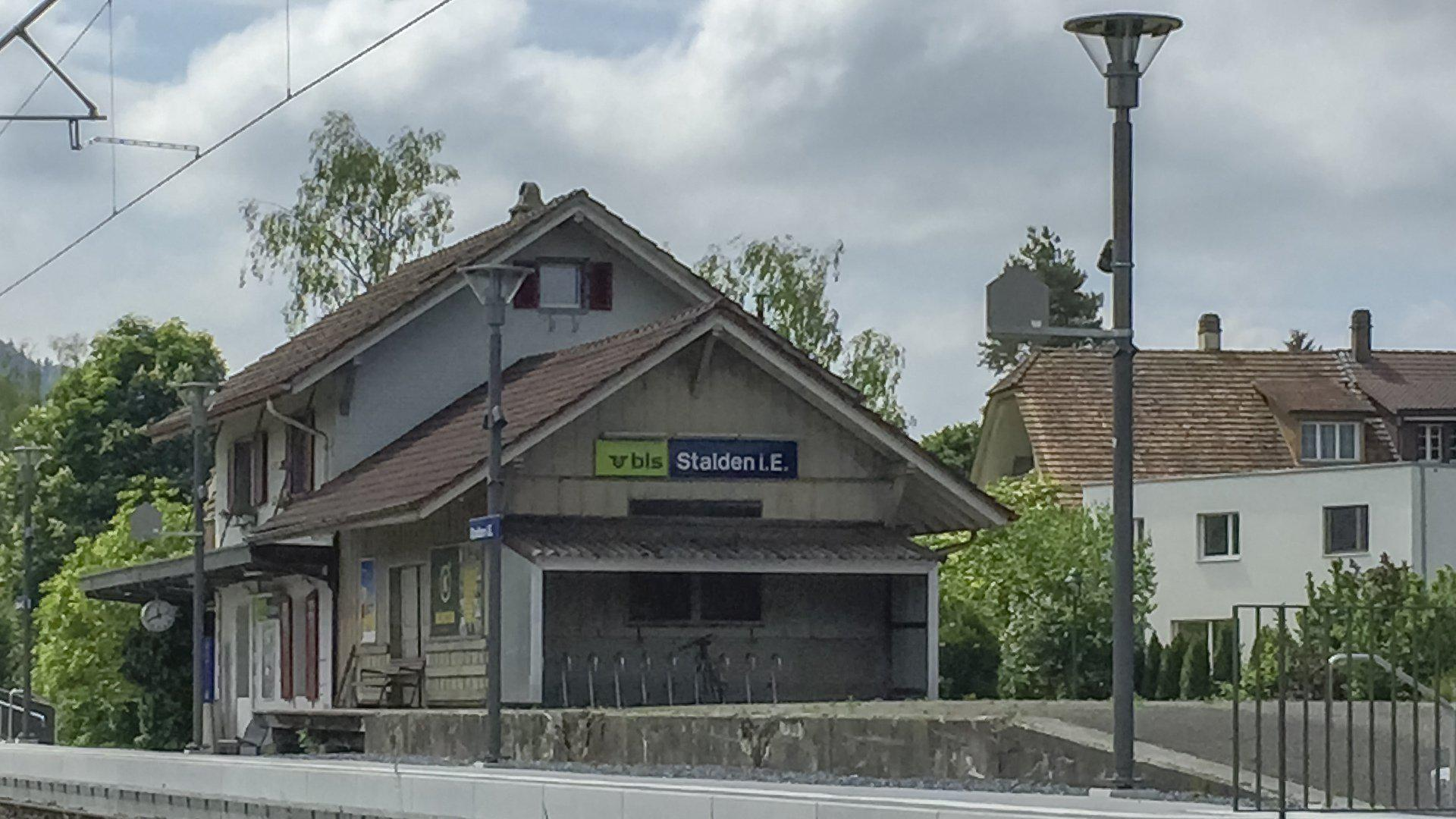
- The station building in 2018

General information
- Location: Konolfingen; Switzerland
- Coordinates: 46°52′15″N 7°37′22″E
- Elevation: 654 m (2,146 ft)
- Owner: BLS AG
- Line: Burgdorf–Thun line
- Distance: 20.0 km (12.4 mi) from Hasle-Rüegsau
- Platforms: 1 side platform
- Tracks: 1
- Train operators: BLS AG

Construction
- Parking: Yes (10 spaces)
- Accessible: Yes

Other information
- Station code: 8508256 (STAL)
- Fare zone: 130 (Libero)

Passengers
- 2023: 180 per weekday (BLS)

Services
Preceding station	Bern S-Bahn	Following station
Oberdiessbach towards Thun	S21	Konolfingen Terminus
Oberdiessbach towards Thun	S42	Konolfingen towards Hasle-Rüegsau
Location

Stalden i.E. railway station (German: Bahnhof Stalden im Emmental), also known as Stalden im Emmental railway station, is a railway station in Stalden im Emmental (municipality of Konolfingen), in the Swiss canton of Bern. It is located on the standard gauge Burgdorf–Thun line of BLS AG. This station is served as a request stop by local trains only.

== Services ==
As of the December 2024 timetable change, the following services stop at Stalden i.E.:

- Bern S-Bahn S21 / S42: two per hour between Thun and Konolfingen, with every other train continuing from Konolfingen to Hasle-Rüegsau.
