= Tägertschi railway station =

Railway station in Münsingen, Switzerland

Tägertschi
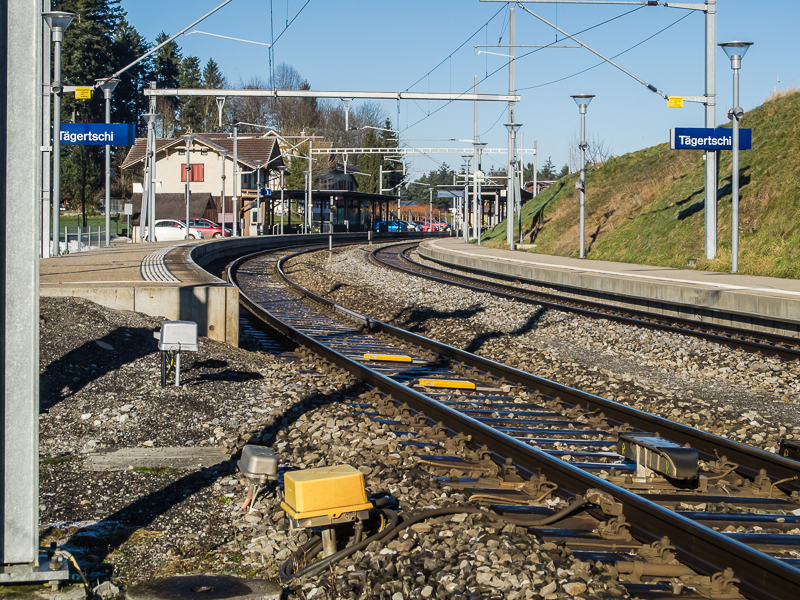
- The station platforms in 2015

General information
- Location: Münsingen; Switzerland
- Coordinates: 46°52′56″N 7°34′51″E
- Elevation: 644 m (2,113 ft)
- Owner: Swiss Federal Railways
- Line: Bern–Lucerne line
- Platforms: 2 side platforms
- Tracks: 2
- Train operators: BLS AG

Construction
- Parking: Yes (12 spaces)
- Cycle facilities: Yes (28 spaces)
- Accessible: Yes

Other information
- Station code: 8508201 (TI)
- Fare zone: 126 (Libero)

Passengers
- 2023: 130 per weekday (BLS)

Services
Preceding station	Bern S-Bahn	Following station
Worb SBB towards Laupen BE	S2	Konolfingen towards Langnau i.E.
Location

Tägertschi railway station (German: Bahnhof Tägertschi) is a railway station in the municipality of Münsingen, in the Swiss canton of Bern. It is an intermediate stop on the standard gauge Bern–Lucerne line of Swiss Federal Railways.

== Services ==
As of the December 2024 timetable change, the following services stop at Tägertschi:

- Bern S-Bahn: S2: half-hourly service between Laupen BE and Langnau.
