= Beatenberg =

- Municipality
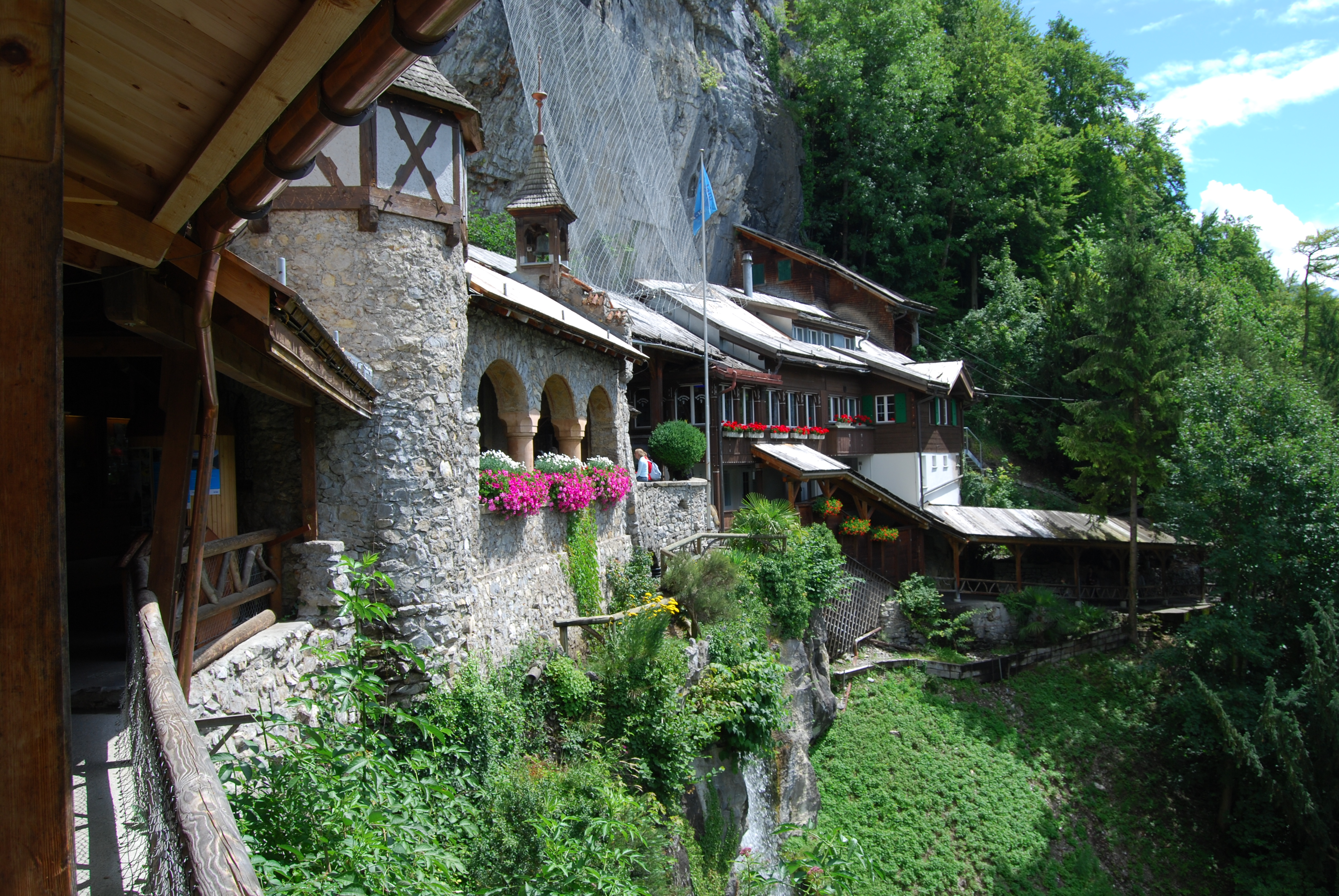
- Restaurant and chapel at the entry of Saint Beatus Caves below Beatenberg

- Flag Coat of arms
- Location of Beatenberg
- Location within Switzerland Location within Canton of Bern
- Coordinates: 46°41′N 7°47′E
- Country: Switzerland
- Canton: Bern
- District: Interlaken

Government
  - Executive: Gemeinderat with 7 members
  - Mayor: Gemeindepräsident(in); Roland Noirjean (as of 2026)

Area
  - Total: 29.2 km^{2} (11.3 sq mi)
- Elevation: 1,129 m (3,704 ft)
- Highest elevation: 2,063 m (6,768 ft)
- Lowest elevation: 559 m (1,834 ft)

Population (December 2020)
  - Total: 1,199
  - Density: 41.1/km^{2} (106/sq mi)
- Time zone: UTC+01:00 (CET)
  - Summer (DST): UTC+02:00 (CEST)
- Postal code: 3803
- SFOS number: 571
- ISO 3166 code: CH-BE
- Surrounded by: Habkern, Sigriswil, Unterseen
- Website: https://beatenberg.ch/

Beatenberg (Highest Alemannic: Baatebärg) is a municipality in the Interlaken district of the canton of Bern in Switzerland.

== History ==
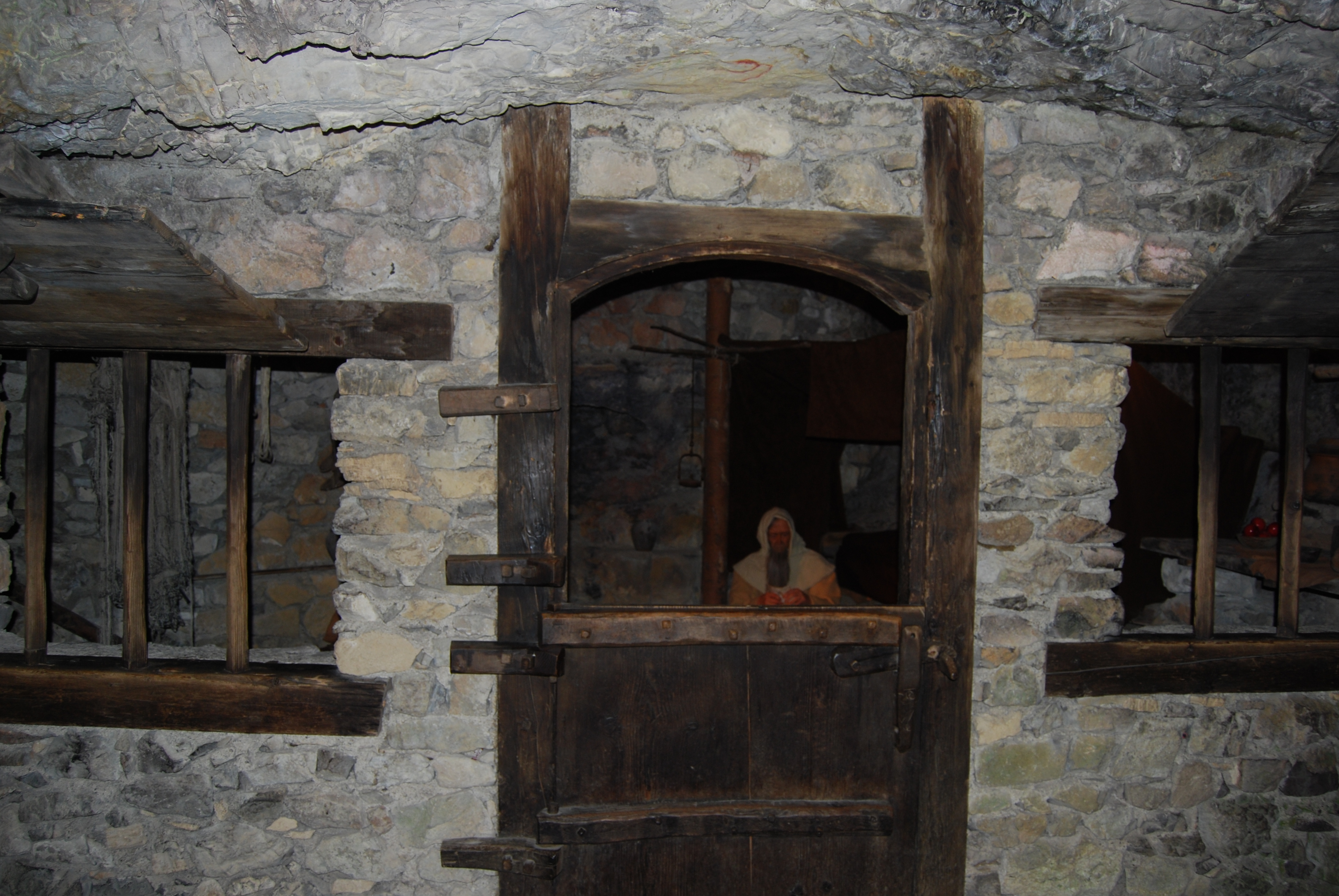
Saint Beatus' cell in the Beatushöhlen

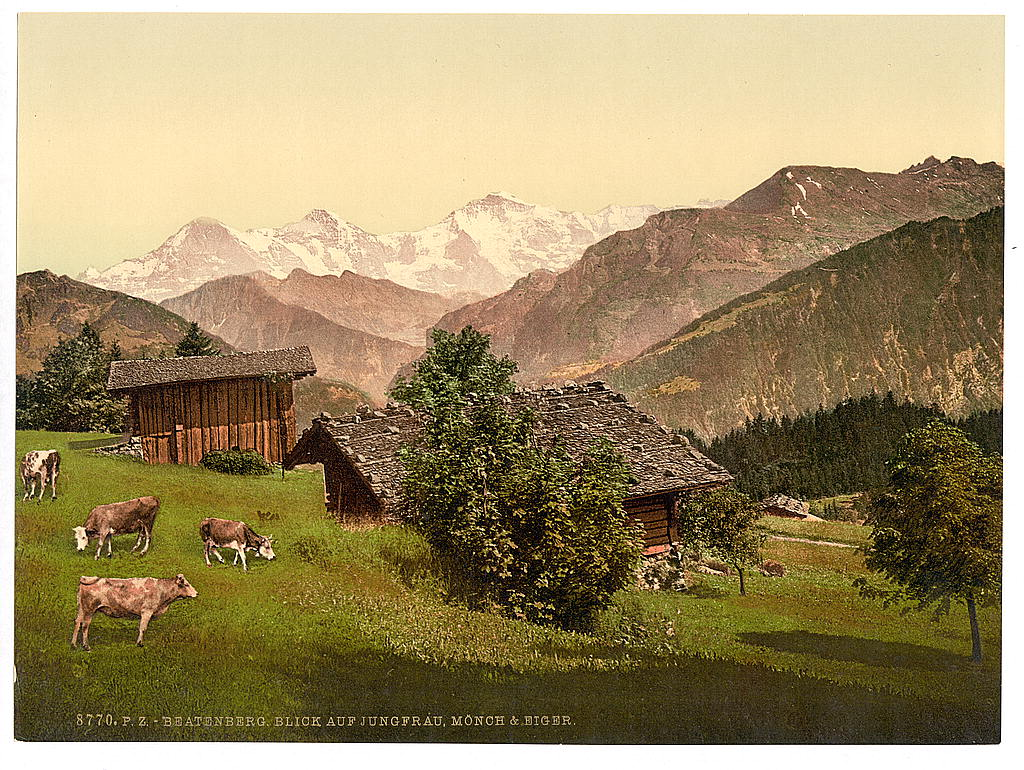
Early 20th century postcard of the Bernese Oberland from Beatenburg

Beatenberg is first mentioned in 1275 as super rupes. In 1281 it was mentioned as ob den fluen and in 1357 as Sant Beaten berge.

The earliest trace of a settlement in the area are some early medieval graves near the Beatushöhlen (Saint Beatus cave). According to legend, Saint Beatus was a Scottish or Irish monk who was sent to evangelize the Helvetii. After finding success in the Jura Mountains, he moved into the Beatenberg area where he defeated a dragon and established a hermitage in the cave overlooking Thun Lake. While the story is probably legendary, the caves became a pilgrimage destination. A chapel was built by the cave for the visiting pilgrims. By 1230 the chapel had grown into a parish church, which in the following century was brought under the control of Interlaken Monastery.

During the 13th century a number of local nobles owned land or rights in and around the area. In 1334 Interlaken Monastery acquired some land in the village. The monastery eventually grew into the largest landlord in Beatenburg. However, in 1528, Bern adopted the Protestant Reformation and secularized Interlaken Monastery. The village was acquired by Bern and placed in the bailiwick of Interlaken. The Catholic pilgrimage chapel was promptly closed and the cave was walled up. The reformed leaders built a wooden reformed church on a nearby hill in 1534–40.

In 1762 the village became part of the district of Unterseen. Following the 1798 French invasion and the Act of Mediation in 1803, Beatenberg became part of the newly recreated Interlaken District.

The municipality is made up of several scattered farming hamlets. Traditionally they lived from seasonal alpine herding along with small farms. In the 18th century several wool spinning mills moved into the village and provided additional income. A coal mine opened on the Gemmenalp in 1771, followed by another at Niederhorn in 1795. However, both mines closed in 1856. The municipality's first health spa opened in the rectory building. The first spa was so successful that by 1866 several hotels and spas had opened. It became a luxury destination which flourished until the beginning of World War I in 1914. The tourism industry remained depressed until 1959, when Beatenberg rebuilt itself as a place for vacation homes and weekend visits. By 1980 there were over 250 vacation or second apartments. Today, about 70% of the working population works in the tourism industry.

== Geography ==
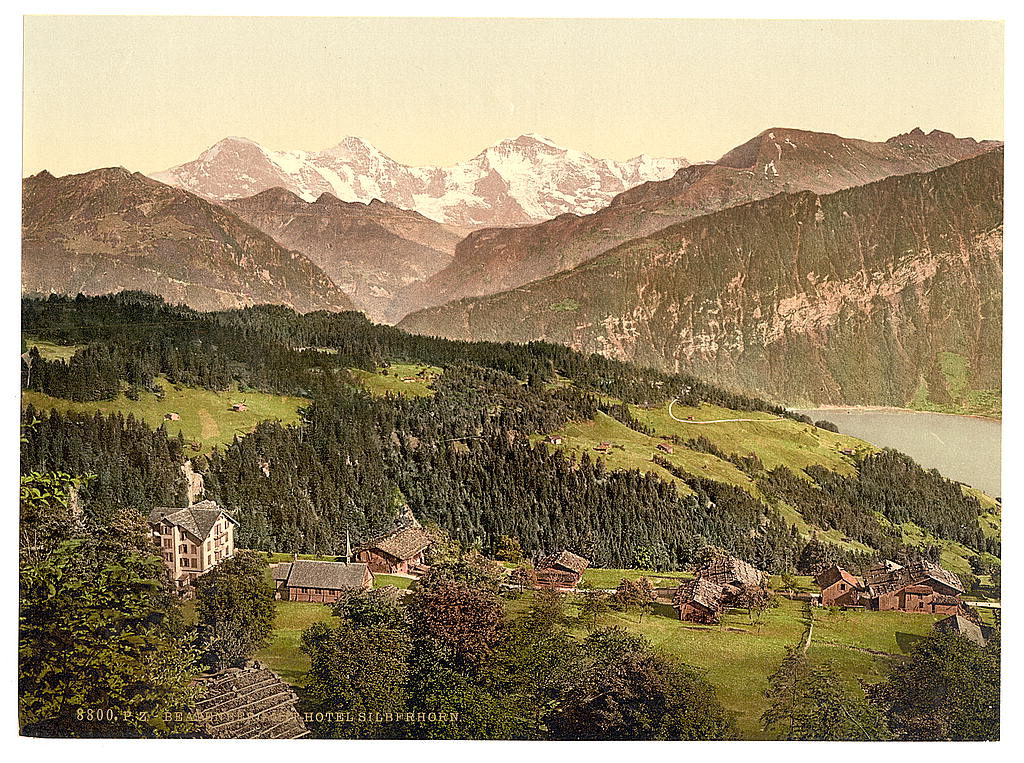
Beatenberg village and Hotel Silberhorn, between 1890 and 1900

Beatenberg is located in the Bernese Oberland on a steppe beneath the Niederhorn and high above Lake Thun. Beatenberg affords good views of the Jungfrau Group (Eiger, Mönch and Jungfrau). Beatenberg is linked to Beatenbucht on Lake Thun by the Thunersee–Beatenberg funicular, which connects with shipping services on the lake. The Beatenberg-Niederhorn gondola lift runs to the summit of the Niederhorn.

Aerial view (1952)

Beatenberg has an area of 29.17 km^{2} (11.26 sq mi). Of this area, 9.62 km^{2} (3.71 mi^{2}) or 32.9% is used for agricultural purposes, while 15.68 km^{2} (6.05 mi^{2}) or 53.6% is forested. Of the rest of the land, 1.23 km^{2} (0.47 mi^{2}) or 4.2% is settled (buildings or roads), 0.1 km^{2} (25 acres) or 0.3% is either rivers or lakes and 2.59 km^{2} (1.00 mi^{2}) or 8.9% is unproductive land.

Of the built up area, housing and buildings made up 2.1% and transportation infrastructure made up 1.5%. Out of the forested land, 46.6% of the total land area is heavily forested and 6.7% is covered with orchards or small clusters of trees. Of the agricultural land, 9.5% is pastures and 23.2% is used for alpine pastures. All the water in the municipality is flowing water. Of the unproductive areas, 5.6% is unproductive vegetation and 3.3% is too rocky for vegetation.

It includes the farming coops of Schmocken, Spirenwald, Waldegg and several scattered independent farms as well as the village of Sundlauenen am See.

On 31 December 2009 Amtsbezirk Interlaken, the municipality's former district, was dissolved. On the following day, 1 January 2010, it joined the newly created Verwaltungskreis Interlaken-Oberhasli.

== Coat of arms ==
The blazon of the municipal coat of arms is Argent a Wyvern rampant Vert langued Gules on dexter and Saint Beatus clad Sable haloed Or with holding in sinister a Book leathered Gules and in dexter raised a stick Sable.

== Demographics ==
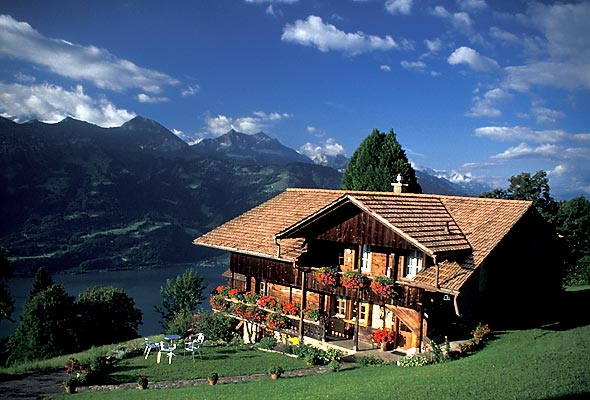
Traditional house

Beatenberg has a population (as of December 2020) of 1,199. As of 2010, 12.9% of the population are resident foreign nationals. Over the last 10 years (2000-2010) the population has changed at a rate of -4.9%. Migration accounted for 0.5%, while births and deaths accounted for -4%.

Most of the population (as of 2000) speaks German (1,185 or 92.7%) as their first language, Serbo-Croatian is the second most common (20 or 1.6%) and Dutch is the third (15 or 1.2%). There are 12 people who speak French, 6 people who speak Italian and 1 person who speaks Romansh.

As of 2008, the population was 50.0% male and 50.0% female. The population was made up of 495 Swiss men (43.2% of the population) and 77 (6.7%) non-Swiss men. There were 502 Swiss women (43.8%) and 71 (6.2%) non-Swiss women. Of the population in the municipality, 445 or about 34.8% were born in Beatenberg and lived there in 2000. There were 345 or 27.0% who were born in the same canton, while 246 or 19.2% were born somewhere else in Switzerland, and 206 or 16.1% were born outside of Switzerland.

As of 2010, children and teenagers (0–19 years old) make up 16.2% of the population, while adults (20–64 years old) make up 59% and seniors (over 64 years old) make up 24.7%.

As of 2000, there were 535 people who were single and never married in the municipality. There were 580 married individuals, 96 widows or widowers and 68 individuals who are divorced.

As of 2000, there were 187 households that consist of only one person and 28 households with five or more people. In 2000, a total of 496 apartments (44.0% of the total) were permanently occupied, while 536 apartments (47.5%) were seasonally occupied and 96 apartments (8.5%) were empty. As of 2010, the construction rate of new housing units was 3.5 new units per 1000 residents.

The historical population is given in the following chart:

== Points of interest ==
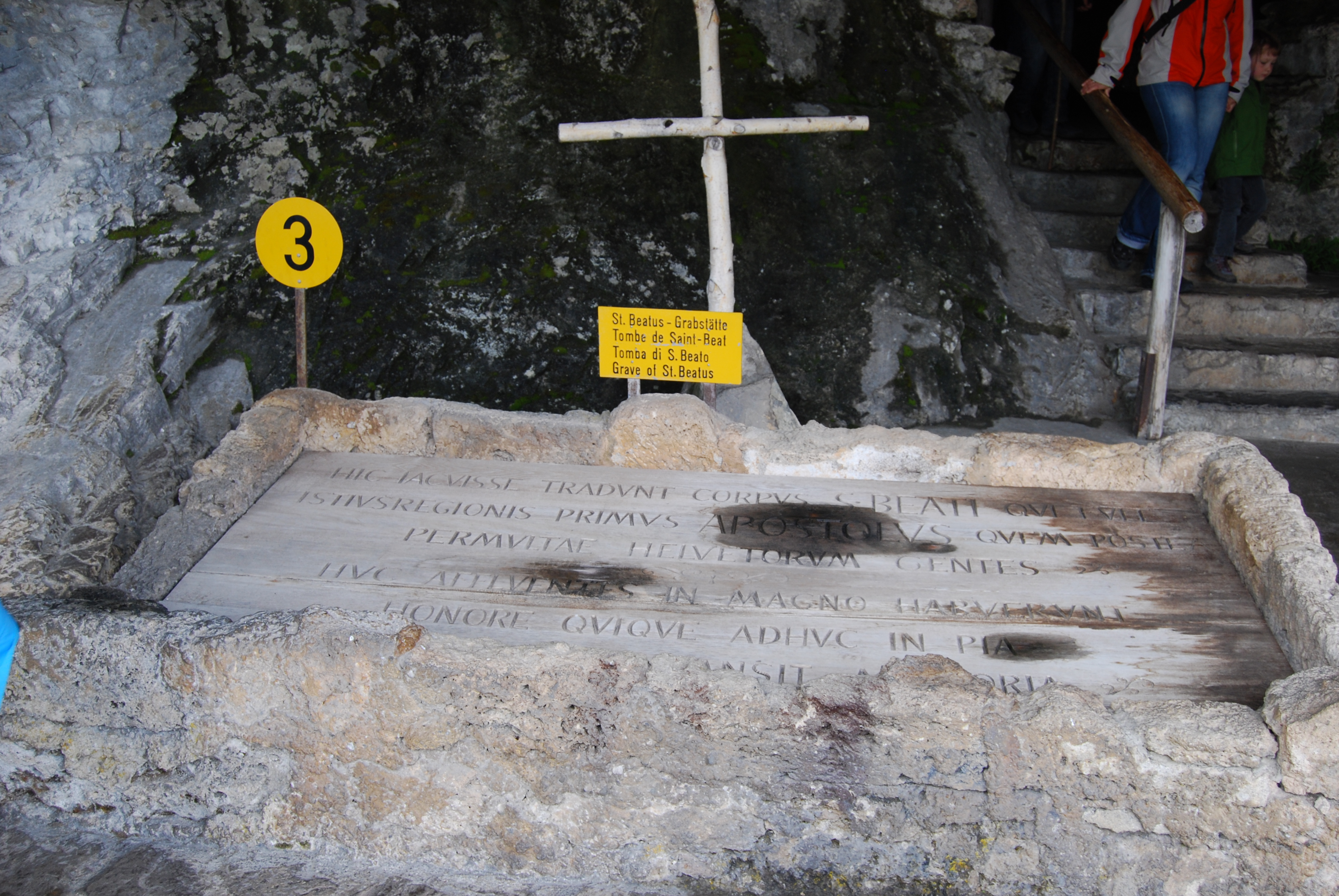
Grave of St. Beatus

The local saint is Saint Beatus. According to legend, Beatus was a missionary who came from Ireland to Lake Thun and who there expelled a dragon from the caves above Sundlauenen. His domicile in the dragon's cave has become a place of pilgrimage. Even today, the kilometer-long limestone cave with its subterranean lakes is a main tourist attraction of the locality.

== Politics ==
In the 2011 federal election the most popular party was the Swiss People's Party (SVP) which received 46.5% of the vote. The next three most popular parties were the Conservative Democratic Party (BDP) (13.7%), the Social Democratic Party (SP) (9.9%) and the Federal Democratic Union of Switzerland (EDU) (6.7%). In the federal election, a total of 470 votes were cast, and the voter turnout was 52.9%.

== Economy ==
As of 2011, Beatenberg had an unemployment rate of 1.6%. As of 2008, there were a total of 578 people employed in the municipality. Of these, there were 93 people employed in the primary economic sector and about 34 businesses involved in this sector. 89 people were employed in the secondary sector and there were 22 businesses in this sector. 396 people were employed in the tertiary sector, with 61 businesses in this sector. There were 634 residents of the municipality who were employed in some capacity, of which females made up 48.4% of the workforce.

In 2008 there were a total of 414 full-time equivalent jobs. The number of jobs in the primary sector was 43, all of which were in agriculture. The number of jobs in the secondary sector was 84 of which 3 or (3.6%) were in manufacturing, 35 or (41.7%) were in mining and 45 (53.6%) were in construction. The number of jobs in the tertiary sector was 287. In the tertiary sector; 21 or 7.3% were in wholesale or retail sales or the repair of motor vehicles, 19 or 6.6% were in the movement and storage of goods, 130 or 45.3% were in a hotel or restaurant, 7 or 2.4% were technical professionals or scientists, 10 or 3.5% were in education and 69 or 24.0% were in health care.

In 2000, there were 126 workers who commuted into the municipality and 212 workers who commuted away. The municipality is a net exporter of workers, with about 1.7 workers leaving the municipality for every one entering. Of the working population, 12.6% used public transportation to get to work, and 44% used a private car.

== Religion ==
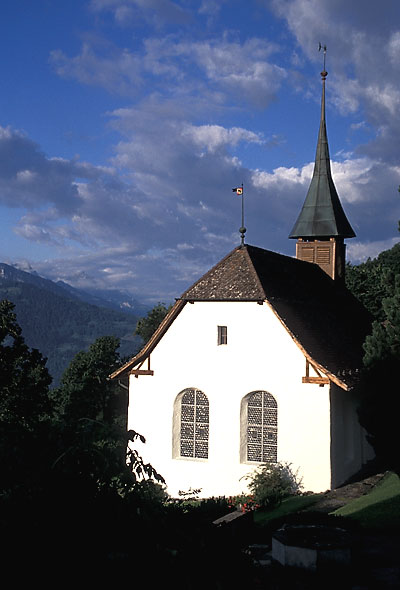
Reformed church

From the 2000 census, 118 or 9.2% were Roman Catholic, while 888 or 69.4% belonged to the Swiss Reformed Church. Of the rest of the population, there were 34 members of an Orthodox church (or about 2.66% of the population), there were 2 individuals (or about 0.16% of the population) who belonged to the Christian Catholic Church, and there were 120 individuals (or about 9.38% of the population) who belonged to another Christian church. There were 20 (or about 1.56% of the population) who were Islamic. There were 2 individuals who were Buddhist and 1 individual who belonged to another church. 115 (or about 8.99% of the population) belonged to no church, are agnostic or atheist, and 37 individuals (or about 2.89% of the population) did not answer the question.

== Education ==
In Beatenberg about 546 or (42.7%) of the population have completed non-mandatory upper secondary education, and 134 or (10.5%) have completed additional higher education (either university or a Fachhochschule). Of the 134 who completed tertiary schooling, 57.5% were Swiss men, 18.7% were Swiss women, 12.7% were non-Swiss men and 11.2% were non-Swiss women.

The Canton of Bern school system provides one year of non-obligatory Kindergarten, followed by six years of Primary school. This is followed by three years of obligatory lower Secondary school where the students are separated according to ability and aptitude. Following the lower Secondary students may attend additional schooling or they may enter an apprenticeship.

During the 2010–11 school year, there were a total of 133 students attending classes in Beatenberg. There was one kindergarten class with a total of 11 students in the municipality. Of the kindergarten students, 9.1% were permanent or temporary residents of Switzerland (not citizens) and 9.1% have a different mother language than the classroom language. The municipality had 3 primary classes and 49 students. Of the primary students, 6.1% were permanent or temporary residents of Switzerland (not citizens) and 4.1% have a different mother language than the classroom language. During the same year, there were 2 lower secondary classes with a total of 27 students. There were 11.1% who were permanent or temporary residents of Switzerland (not citizens) and 14.8% have a different mother language than the classroom language.

As of 2000, there were 3 students in Beatenberg who came from another municipality, while 20 residents attended schools outside the municipality.

Beatenberg is home to the Bibliothek Mediothek Beatenberg library. The library has (as of 2008) 5,696 books or other media. It was open a total of 130 days with average of 6 hours per week during that year.

== Famous inhabitants ==
- Albert Gatschet (1832–1907), ethnologist and linguist, born in Beatenberg
- Erich von Däniken (born 1935), author, currently living in Beatenberg
- Maria Ivogün (1891–1987), soprano singer, German (born Hungarian)
- Michael Raucheisen (1889–1984), German pianist
