= Worb SBB railway station =

Railway station in Worb, Switzerland

Worb SBB
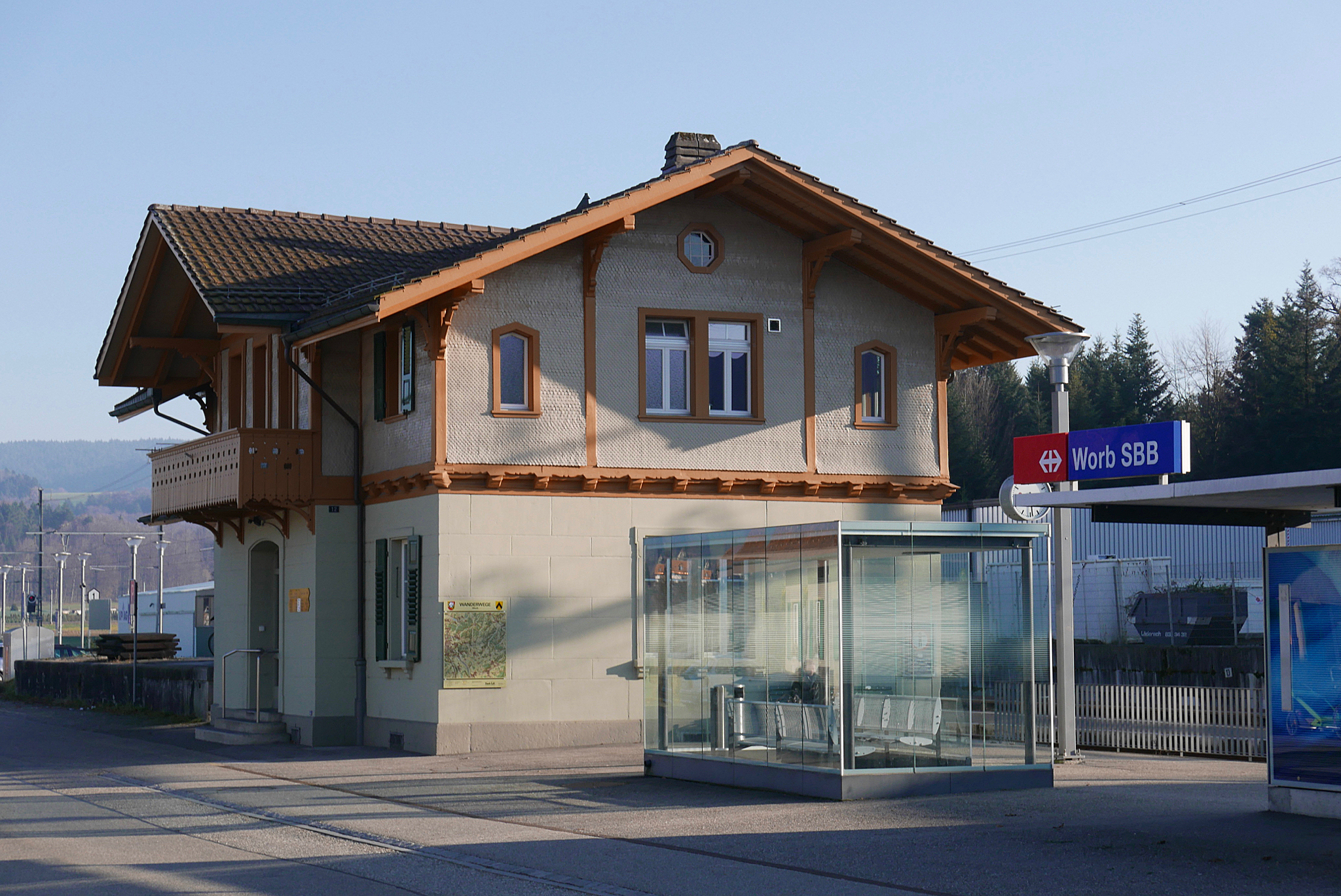
- The station building in 2016

General information
- Location: Worb; Switzerland
- Coordinates: 46°54′55″N 7°33′53″E
- Elevation: 607 m (1,991 ft)
- Owner: Swiss Federal Railways
- Line: Bern–Lucerne line
- Platforms: 2 side platforms
- Tracks: 1
- Train operators: BLS AG
- Connections: BERNMOBIL bus line; PostAuto AG bus services

Construction
- Parking: Yes (40 spaces)
- Cycle facilities: Yes
- Accessible: Yes

Other information
- Station code: 8508100 (WB)
- Fare zone: 115 (Libero)

Passengers
- 2023: 570 per weekday (BLS)

Services
Preceding station	Bern S-Bahn	Following station
Gümligen towards Laupen BE	S2	Tägertschi towards Langnau i.E.
Bern Wankdorf towards Bern	S22 Rush-hour service	Konolfingen One-way operation
Location

Worb SBB railway station (German: Bahnhof Worb SBB) is a railway station in the municipality of Worb, in the Swiss canton of Bern. It is an intermediate stop on the standard gauge Bern–Lucerne line of Swiss Federal Railways. The station is located outside Worb, some 1.8 kilometres (1.1 mi) south from the Worb Dorf station in the city center.

== Services ==
As of the December 2024 timetable change, the following services stop at Worb SBB:

- Bern S-Bahn:
  - S2: half-hourly service between Laupen BE and Langnau.
  - S22: daily morning rush-hour service on weekdays to Bern.
