= Seilbahnen Beatenberg-Niederhorn =

Pulsed movement gondola lift

The Seilbahnen Beatenberg-Niederhorn is a pulsed movement gondola lift in the canton of Bern, Switzerland. It links the village of Beatenberg with the summit of the Niederhorn. At Beatenberg, the lift connects with the Thunersee–Beatenberg Bahn, a funicular which links with the shipping services on Lake Thun.

The lift, opened in 1997, replaces an earlier aerial cable car on a similar route that was completed in 1946. The line operates four groups of three cabins, which are moved by an endless cable whilst supported by two further cables. Each cabin accommodates up to 17 passengers. There is one intermediate stop, at Vorsass.
