= Verkehrsbetriebe STI =

Bus operator in the Swiss canton of Bern

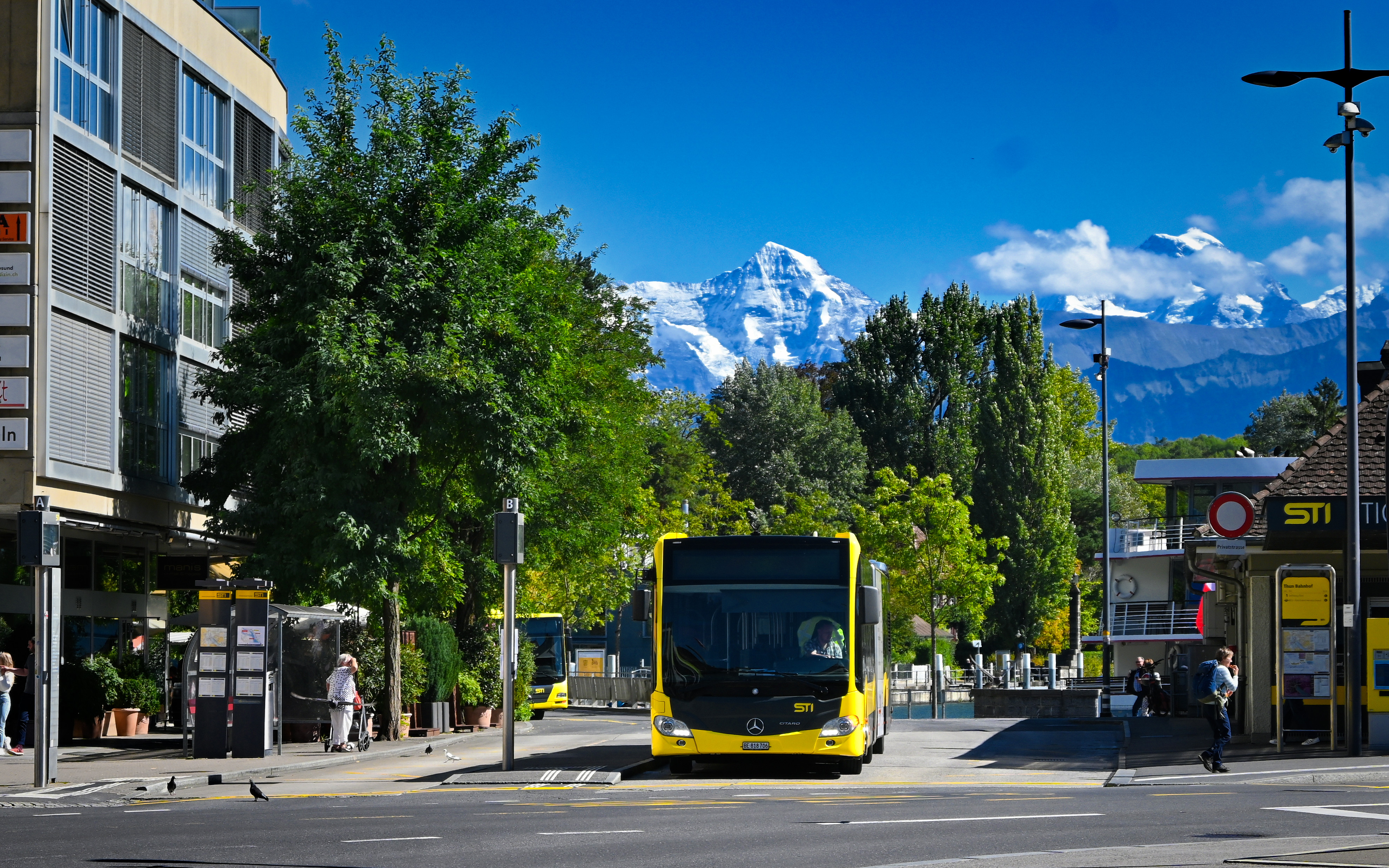
- Locale: Steffisburg, Thun, Interlaken
- Routes: 20
- Website: www.stibus.ch
System map
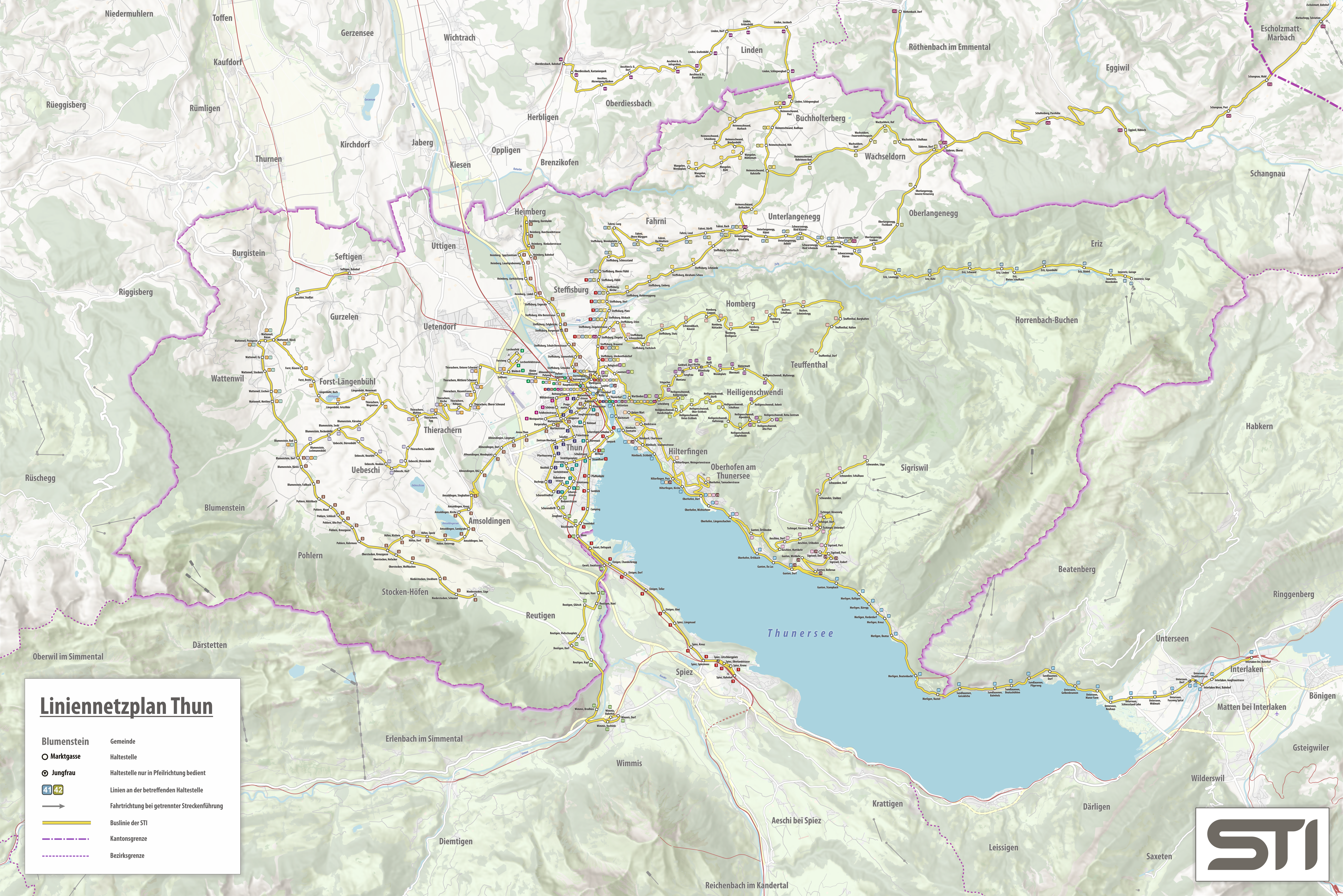

Verkehrsbetriebe STI (Steffisburg-Thun-Interlaken) is a bus operator in the Swiss canton of Bern. It is a private company based in the city of Thun, and operates bus services in that city, as well as routes linking Thun with the neighbouring towns and villages including the tourist hubs of Interlaken and Steffisburg.

The company also manages the Thunersee–Beatenberg Funicular and the Seilbahnen Beatenberg-Niederhorn.

== History ==
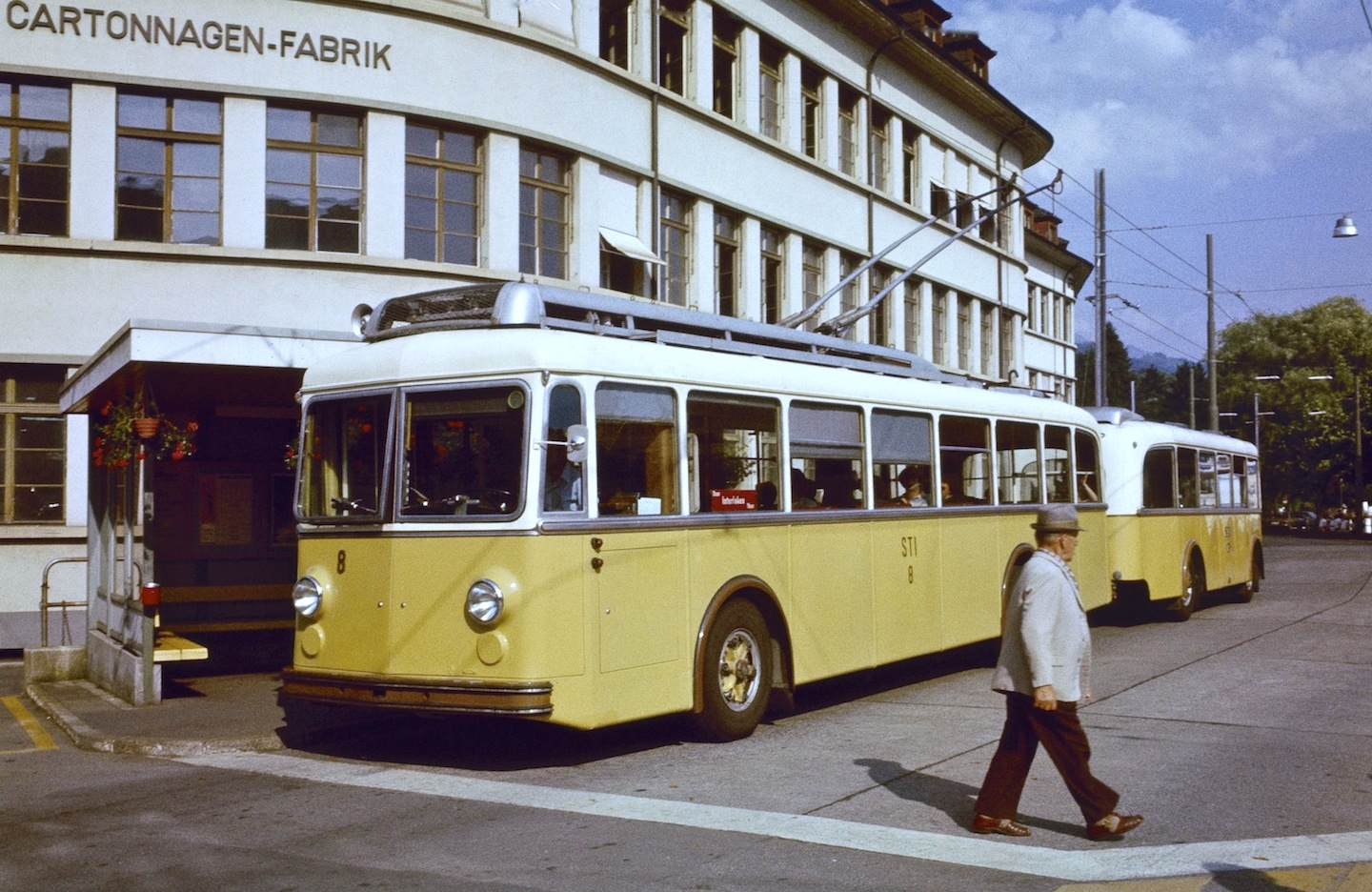
A trolleybus and trailer at the Thun STI station in 1979.

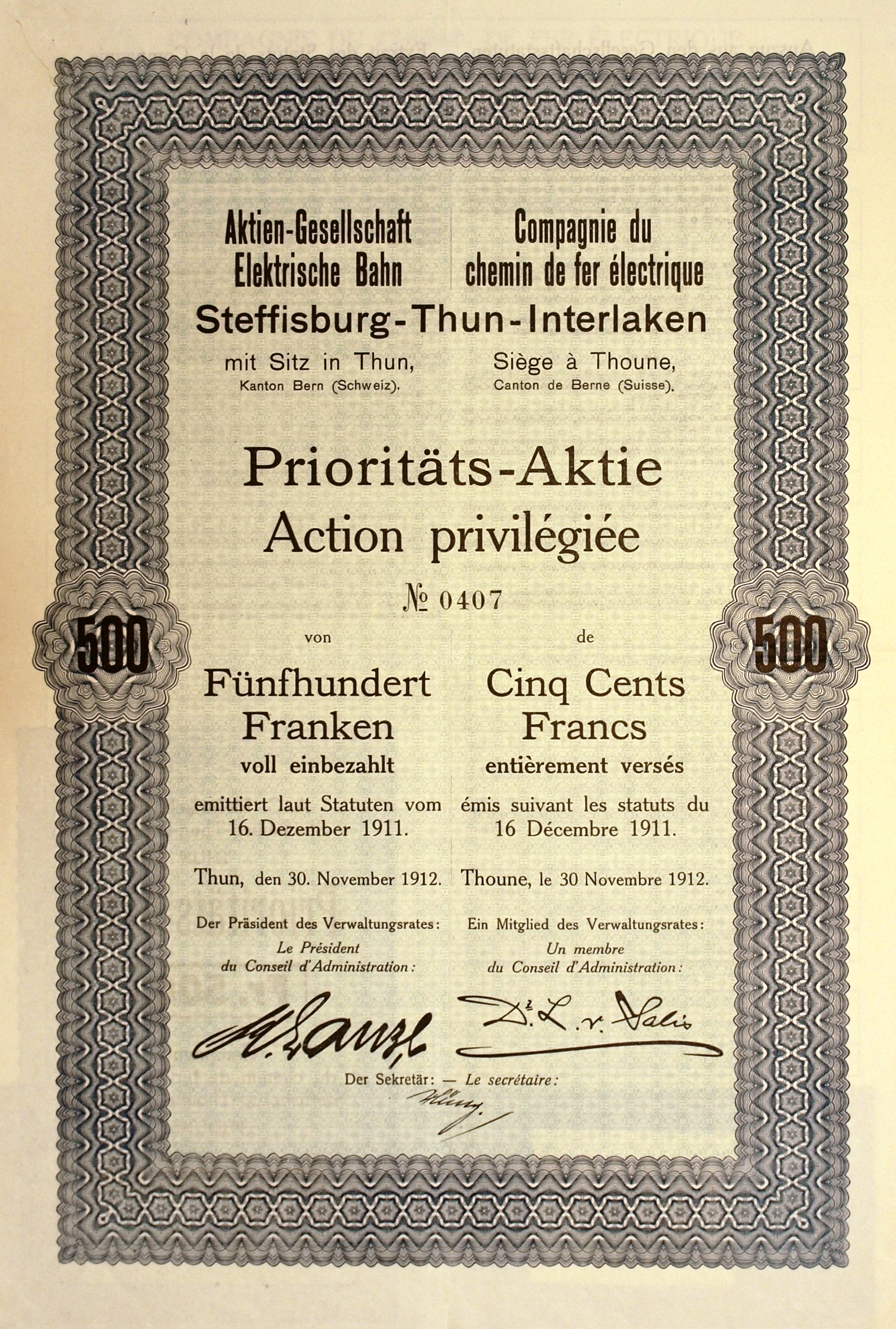
Share of the AG Elektrische Bahn Steffisburg-Thun-Interlaken, issued 30. November 1912

STI was formed in December 1911, originally as the Elektrische Bahn Steffisburg-Thun-Interlaken (English: Steffisburg–Thun–Interlaken Electric Railway), and began carrying passengers on 10 October 1913, with the opening of a tram line between Steffisburg and Oberhofen (via Thun), which was later extended to Beatenbucht and finally to Interlaken. Plans for road rebuilding led to the closure of the Beatenbucht–Interlaken section of tramway in 1939, but trams continued to provide the Thun–Beatenbucht service, STI's main line, until 1952. The Thun–Steffisburg tram line closed in 1958, and since then the STI network has been covered exclusively by buses. Trolleybuses, powered by electricity drawn from overhead wires, were used on the main line, Thun–Beatenbucht, connecting at Beatenbucht with the Thunersee–Beatenberg funicular and with a motorbus route covering the section to Interlaken. In 1982, the trolleybuses were replaced with conventional, diesel-powered buses. STI introduced its first night service in 1993, between Thun and Bern called the Moonliner. Further extensions made to the network in 1999 and 2001 took STI buses into areas such as Gwatt, which had seen railway station closures. In 2022, STI moved headquarters to the Cremo building in Schwäbis.

== Lines ==
Line	Route
1	Steffisburg Flühli – Thun – Gwatt Deltapark – Spiez (section Thun Bhf – Gwatt Deltapark formerly SAT, section Einen – Spiez formerly ASKA (Spiez local bus))
2	Thun – Neufeld – Schorenfriedhof (formerly SAT)
3	Blumenstein – Allmendingen – Thun – Alte Bernstrasse – Heimberg Dornhalde (section Thun Bhf – Allmendingen formerly SAT and Thun Bhf – Stocken – Blumenstein formerly TSG)
4	Thun – Lerchenfeld (formerly SAT)
5	Thun – Dürrenast – Schorenfriedhof (formerly SAT)
6	Thun – Westquartier
21	Thun – Oberhofen – Beatenbucht – Interlaken Ost
22	Untere Wart – Hünibach – Höhenweg – Hilterfingen – Friedhof – Oberhofen – Tannacker ("Hangbus")
24	Oberhofen – Aeschlen – Schwanden – Sigriswil (formerly AGS)
25	Thun – (express route) Gunten – Sigriswil (section Gunten – Sigriswil formerly AGS)
31	Thun – Goldiwil – Heiligenschwendi (formerly ATGH)
31	Thun – Dörfli – Heiligenschwendi (formerly ATGH)
33	Thun – Steffisburg – Teuffenthal (formerly Postbus )
41	Thun – Fahrni bei Thun – Schwarzenegg – Innereriz (formerly AvH)
42	Thun – Fahrni bei Thun – Schwarzenegg – Süderen – Heimenschwand (formerly AvH)
43	Thun – Emberg – Heimenschwand (formerly AvH)
44	Oberdiessbach – Linden – Heimenschwand (formerly AvH)
50	Thun – Uebeschi – Blumenstein (formerly TSG)
51	Thun – Wattenwil – Blumenstein (formerly TSG)
53	Blumenstein - Wattenwil - Seftigen, Bahnhof (formerly TSG)
55	Thun – Wimmis (formerly TSG and even earlier section Thun – Reutigen PTT)
M13	Kiesen–Oberdiessbach–Linden–Heimenschwand (night bus)
M15	Bern – Thun – Spiez – Interlaken (night bus)

== Fleet ==
As of January 2014 the fleet consisted of 65 vehicles

== Colors ==
Since its 100th anniversary the STI vehicles are painted in a light yellow and an anthracite.

== See also ==
- Transport in Switzerland
- List of bus operating companies in Switzerland
