= Konolfingen railway station =

Railway station in Konolfingen, Switzerland

Konolfingen
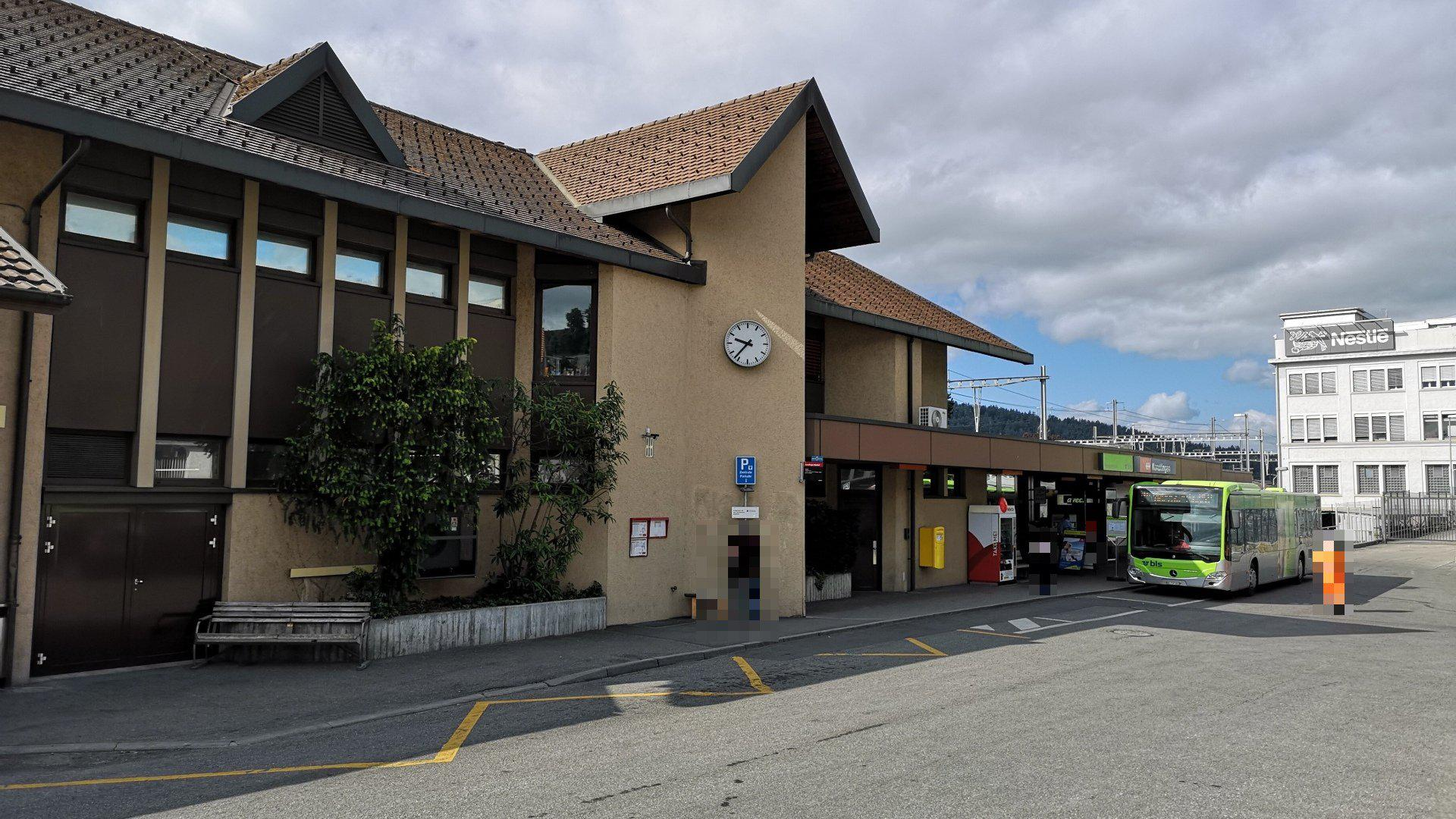
- The station building in 2018

General information
- Location: Konolfingen; Switzerland
- Coordinates: 46°52′51″N 7°37′17″E
- Elevation: 663 m (2,175 ft)
- Owner: Swiss Federal Railways
- Lines: Bern–Lucerne line; Burgdorf–Thun line
- Distance: 18.7 km (11.6 mi) from Hasle-Rüegsau; 20.5 km (12.7 mi) from Bern
- Platforms: 5: 1 side platform; 2 island platforms
- Tracks: 5
- Train operators: BLS AG
- Connections: BERNMOBIL bus line

Construction
- Parking: Yes (64 spaces)
- Cycle facilities: Yes (528 spaces)

Other information
- Station code: 8508202 (KF)
- Fare zone: 130 (Libero)

Passengers
- 2023: 8'300 per weekday (BLS)

Services
Preceding station	Bern S-Bahn	Following station
Tägertschi towards Laupen BE	S2	Zäziwil towards Langnau i.E.
Stalden i.E. towards Thun	S21	Terminus
Worb SBB towards Bern	S22 Rush-hour service	Zäziwil One-way operation
Bern Wankdorf One-way operation	S22 Rush-hour service	Zäziwil towards Langnau i.E.
Oberdiessbach towards Thun	S41	Grosshöchstetten towards Solothurn
Stalden i.E. towards Thun	S42	Grosshöchstetten towards Hasle-Rüegsau
Preceding station	BLS	Following station
Bern Terminus	RE7	Langnau i.E. towards Lucerne
Location

Konolfingen railway station (German: Bahnhof Konolfingen) is a railway station in the municipality of Konolfingen, in the Swiss canton of Bern. It is located at the junction of the standard gauge Bern–Lucerne line of Swiss Federal Railways and the Burgdorf–Thun line of BLS AG.

== Services ==
As of the December 2024 timetable change, the following services stop at Konolfingen:

- RegioExpress: hourly service between Bern and Lucerne.
- Bern S-Bahn:
  - S2: half-hourly service between Laupen BE and Langnau.
  - S22: rush-hour service Monday−Thursday between Bern and Langnau.
  - S21 / S41 / S42: three trains per hour to Thun, half-hourly service to Hasle-Rüegsau, with every other train continuing to Solothurn.
