= Hindelbank railway station =

Railway station in Hindelbank, Switzerland

Hindelbank
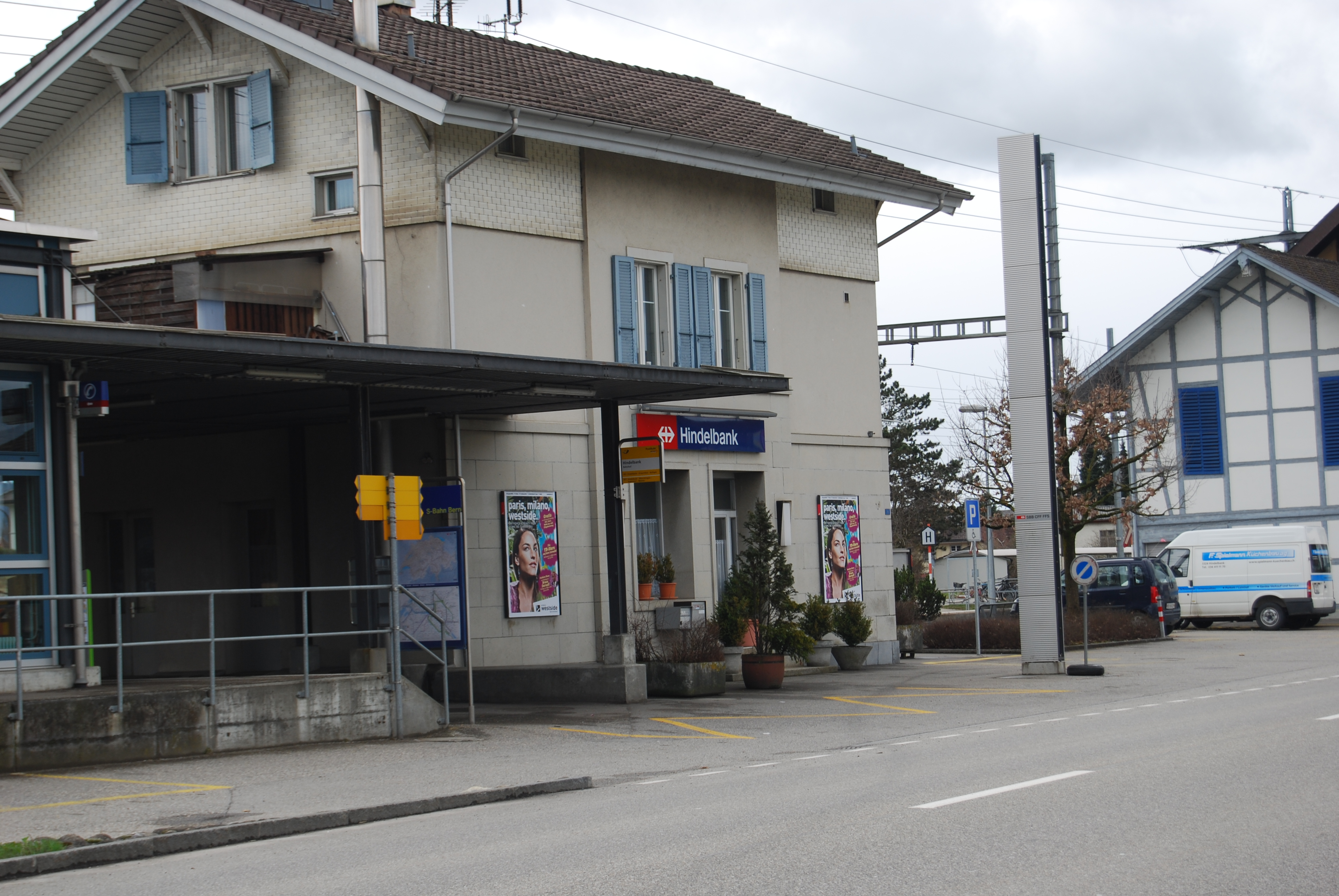
- The station building in 2010

General information
- Location: Hindelbank; Switzerland
- Coordinates: 47°02′58″N 7°32′43″E
- Elevation: 516 m (1,693 ft)
- Owner: Swiss Federal Railways
- Line: Olten–Bern line
- Distance: 89.7 km (55.7 mi) from Basel SBB
- Platforms: 2 side platforms
- Tracks: 2
- Train operators: BLS AG
- Connections: PostAuto AG buses

Construction
- Parking: Yes (33 spaces)
- Cycle facilities: Yes (186 spaces)
- Accessible: Yes

Other information
- Station code: 8508003 (HBK)
- Fare zone: 151 (Libero)

Passengers
- 2023: 1'300 per weekday (BLS)

Services
Preceding station	Bern S-Bahn	Following station
Schönbühl SBB towards Thun	S4	Lyssach towards Langnau i.E.
Bern Wankdorf towards Thun	S44	Lyssach towards Solothurn or Sumiswald-Grünen
Schönbühl SBB towards Ostermundigen	S46 Rush-hour service	Lyssach One-way operation
Location

Hindelbank railway station (German: Bahnhof Hindelbank) is a railway station in the municipality of Hindelbank, in the Swiss canton of Bern. It is an intermediate stop on the standard gauge Olten–Bern line of Swiss Federal Railways.

== Services ==
As of the December 2024 timetable change, the following services stop at Hindelbank:

- Bern S-Bahn
  - S4/S44: half-hourly service between Thun and Burgdorf and hourly service from Burgdorf to Langnau i.E., Solothurn, or Sumiswald-Grünen.
  - S46: morning rush-hour service on weekdays to Ostermundigen.
