= Bern Wankdorf railway station =

Railway station in Bern, Switzerland

Bern Wankdorf
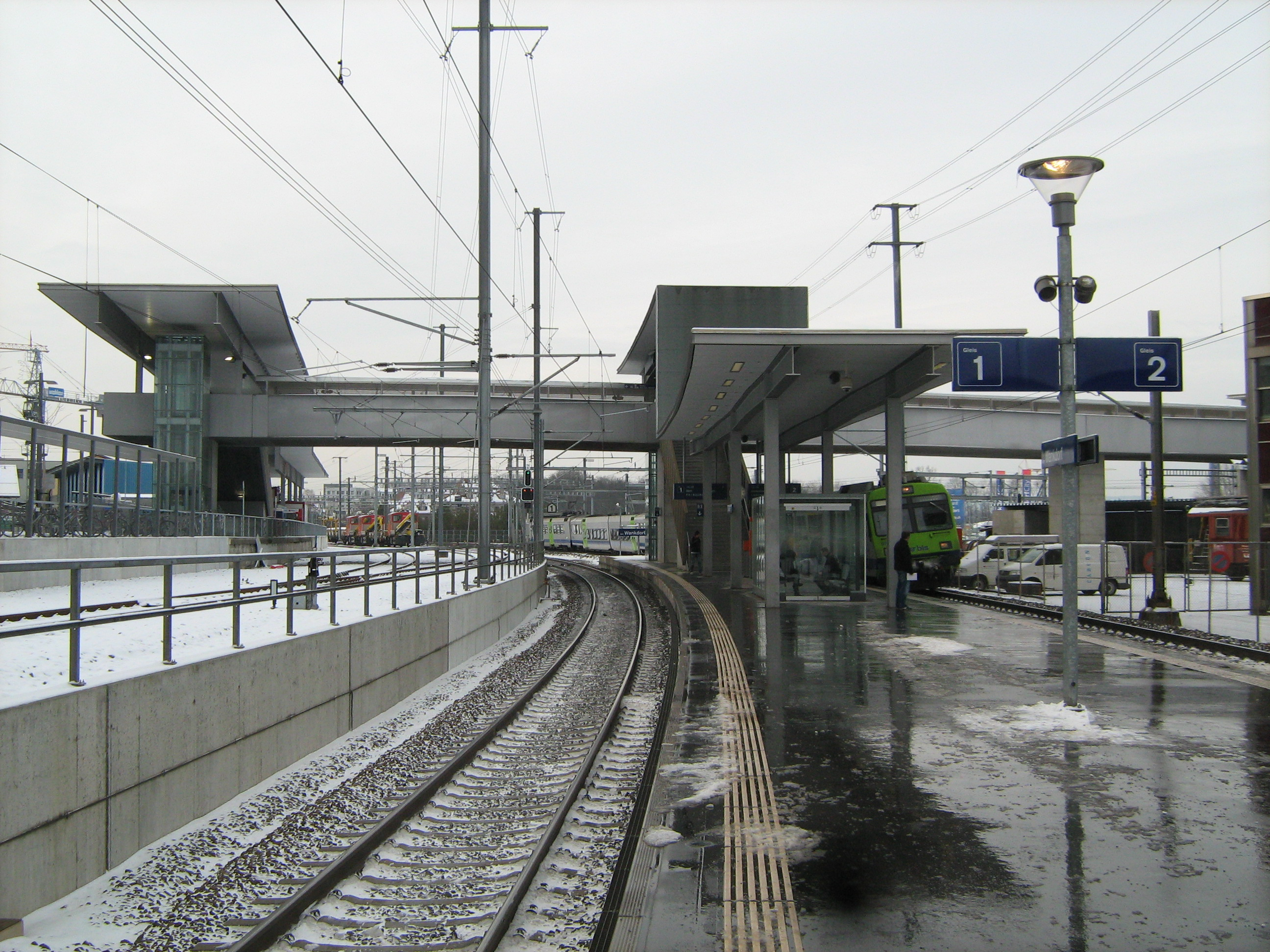
- The station platforms in 2010

General information
- Location: Bern; Switzerland
- Coordinates: 46°58′04″N 7°27′56″E
- Elevation: 549 m (1,801 ft)
- Owner: Swiss Federal Railways
- Lines: Bern–Lucerne line; Bern–Thun line; Biel/Bienne–Bern line; Mittellandlinie; Olten–Bern line
- Distance: 103.0 km (64.0 mi) from Basel SBB
- Platforms: 6: 2 island platforms; 2 side platforms
- Tracks: 6
- Train operators: BLS AG; Swiss Federal Railways
- Connections: Tram line 9; BERNMOBIL buses; RBS buses

Construction
- Parking: Yes
- Cycle facilities: Yes
- Accessible: Yes

Other information
- Station code: 8516161 (BNWD)
- Fare zone: 100 (Libero)

Passengers
- 2025: 15,000 per day (BLS, SBB)
- Rank: 59 out of 1,095

Services
Preceding station	Bern S-Bahn	Following station
Bern towards Fribourg/Freiburg	S1	Ostermundigen towards Thun
Bern Terminus	S11 Rush-hour service	Ostermundigen One-way operation
Bern towards Laupen BE	S2	Ostermundigen towards Langnau i.E.
Bern Terminus	S22 Rush-hour service	Worb SBB One-way operation
Bern One-way operation	S22 Rush-hour service	Konolfingen towards Langnau i.E.
Bern towards Belp	S3	Zollikofen towards Biel/Bienne
Bern towards Belp	S31	Zollikofen towards Münchenbuchsee or Biel/Bienne
Bern towards Thun	S4	Zollikofen towards Langnau i.E.
Bern towards Thun	S44	Hindelbank towards Solothurn or Sumiswald-Grünen
Preceding station	SBB CFF FFS	Following station
Bern Terminus	IC	Zürich Hauptbahnhof towards Zürich HB
Location

Bern Wankdorf railway station (German: Bahnhof Bern Wankdorf) is a railway station in the municipality of Bern, in the Swiss canton of Bern. It is the first station east of Bern and is an intermediate stop on multiple railway lines.

== Layout ==
Bern Wankdorf is an example of a keilbahnhof; the various lines converge west of the station, and it has separate north and south platforms. In the south, adjacent to Max-Dätwyler-Platz, are an island platform and a side platform, serving tracks 1–3. Track 4 is reserved for future expansion. These platforms serve trains on the Bern–Thun line. In the north are another island platform and side platform, serving tracks 5–7. These platforms serve trains on the Biel/Bienne–Bern and Olten–Bern lines.

== History ==
The station was expanded between 2016 and 2023 as part of the Wylerfeld "unbundling" project (German: Entflechtung Wylerfeld), which created a new flying junction for the Bern–Thun line directly west of the station. Another station platform and track were built to accommodate planned additional service, with room for yet another track on the south side of the station.

== Services ==
As of the December 2024 timetable change, the following services stop at Bern Wankdorf:

- Bern S-Bahn:
  - S1: half-hourly service between Fribourg/Freiburg and Thun.
  - S11: two daily rush-hour services on weekdays to Bern.
  - S2: half-hourly service between Laupen BE and Langnau.
  - S22: rush-hour service Monday-Thursday between Bern and Langnau.
  - S3: half-hourly service between Belp and Biel/Bienne.
  - S31: rush-hour service between Münchenbuchsee or Biel/Bienne and Belp.
  - S4: hourly service between Thun and Langnau.
  - S44: hourly service between Thun and Solothurn or Sumiswald-Grünen.
- InterCity: daily rush-hour service to Bern and Zürich Hauptbahnhof.
