= Schönbühl SBB railway station =

Railway station in Urtenen-Schönbühl, Switzerland

Schönbühl SBB
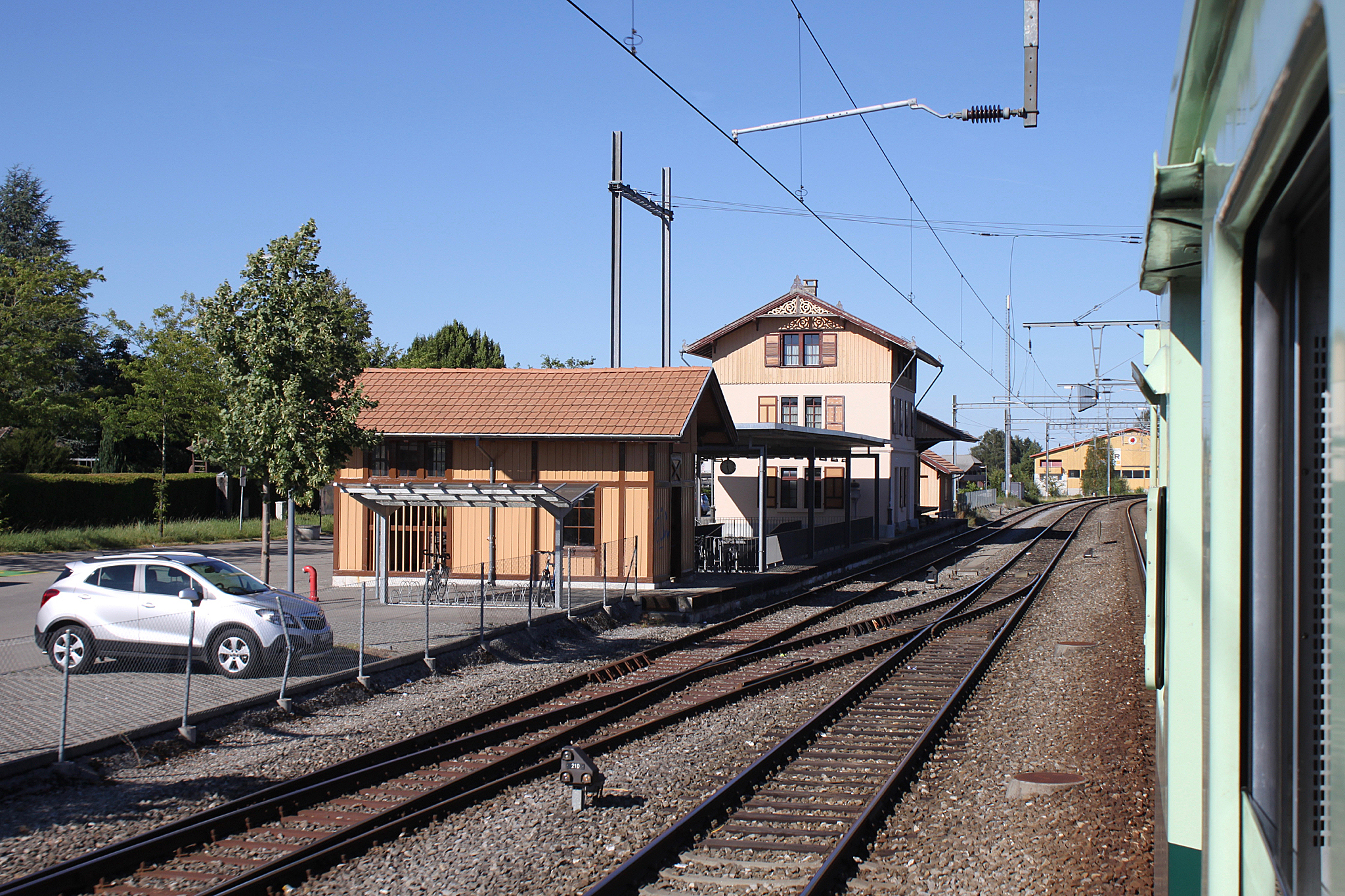
- The station building in 2018

General information
- Location: Urtenen-Schönbühl; Switzerland
- Coordinates: 47°01′08″N 7°29′56″E
- Elevation: 526 m (1,726 ft)
- Owner: Swiss Federal Railways
- Line: Olten–Bern line
- Distance: 94.9 km (59.0 mi) from Basel SBB
- Platforms: 2 (1 island platform)
- Tracks: 4
- Train operators: BLS AG
- Connections: RBS buses

Construction
- Cycle facilities: Yes (52 spaces)
- Accessible: Yes

Other information
- Station code: 8508001 (SCHB)
- Fare zone: 114 (Libero)

Passengers
- 2023: 730 per weekday (BLS (excluding RBS))

Services
Preceding station	Bern S-Bahn	Following station
Zollikofen towards Thun	S4	Hindelbank towards Langnau i.E.
Zollikofen towards Ostermundigen	S46 Rush-hour service	Hindelbank One-way operation
Location

Schönbühl SBB railway station (German: Bahnhof Schönbühl SBB) is a railway station in the municipality of Urtenen-Schönbühl, in the Swiss canton of Bern. It is an intermediate stop on the standard gauge Olten–Bern line of Swiss Federal Railways. The station is approximately 290 metres (950 ft) south of Schönbühl RBS on the 1,000 mm (3 ft 3 3/8 in) gauge Solothurn–Worblaufen line of Regionalverkehr Bern-Solothurn.

== Services ==
As of the December 2024 timetable change, the following services stop at Schönbühl SBB:

- Bern S-Bahn:
  - S4: hourly service between Thun and Langnau i.E..
  - S46: morning rush-hour service on weekdays to Ostermundigen.
