= Lyssach railway station =

Railway station in Lyssach, Switzerland

Lyssach
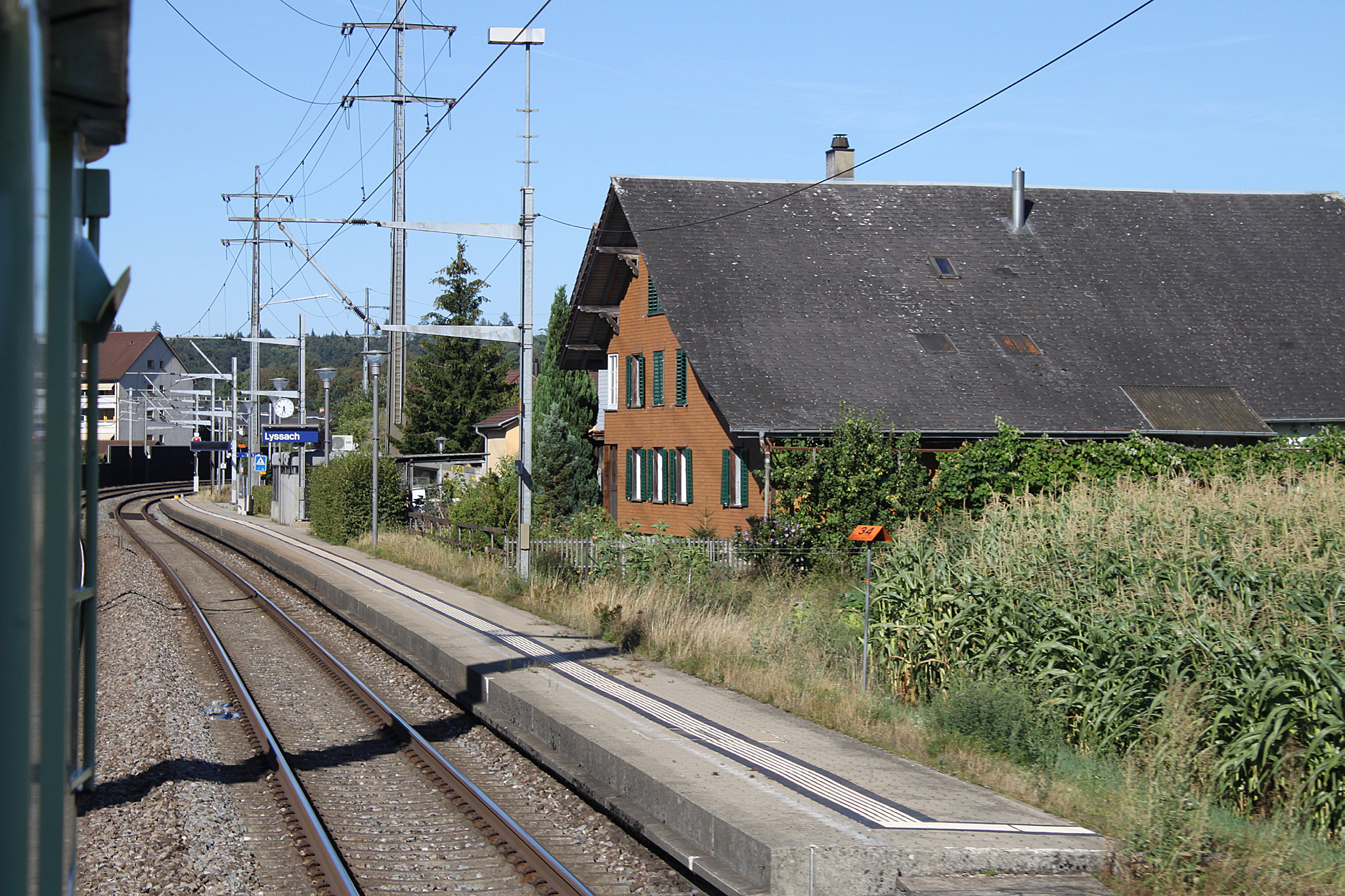
- The station platform in 2018

General information
- Location: Lyssach; Switzerland
- Coordinates: 47°03′50″N 7°34′53″E
- Elevation: 517 m (1,696 ft)
- Owner: Swiss Federal Railways
- Line: Olten–Bern line
- Distance: 86.6 km (53.8 mi) from Basel SBB
- Platforms: 2 side platforms
- Tracks: 2
- Train operators: BLS AG
- Connections: Busland AG bus line

Construction
- Parking: Yes (8 spaces)
- Cycle facilities: Yes (58 spaces)
- Accessible: No

Other information
- Station code: 8508004 (LYS)
- Fare zone: 150 and 151 (Libero)

Passengers
- 2023: 630 per weekday (BLS)

Services
Preceding station	Bern S-Bahn	Following station
Hindelbank towards Thun	S4	Burgdorf towards Langnau i.E.
Hindelbank towards Thun	S44	Burgdorf towards Solothurn or Sumiswald-Grünen
Hindelbank towards Ostermundigen	S46 Rush-hour service	Burgdorf One-way operation
Location

Lyssach railway station (German: Bahnhof Lyssach) is a railway station in the municipality of Lyssach, in the Swiss canton of Bern. It is an intermediate stop on the standard gauge Olten–Bern line of Swiss Federal Railways.

== Services ==
As of the December 2024 timetable change, the following services stop at Lyssach:

- Bern S-Bahn:
  - S4/S44: half-hourly service between Thun and Burgdorf and hourly service from Burgdorf to Langnau i.E., Solothurn, or Sumiswald-Grünen.
  - S46: morning rush-hour service on weekdays to Ostermundigen.
