= Wynigen railway station =

Railway station in Wynigen, Switzerland

Wynigen
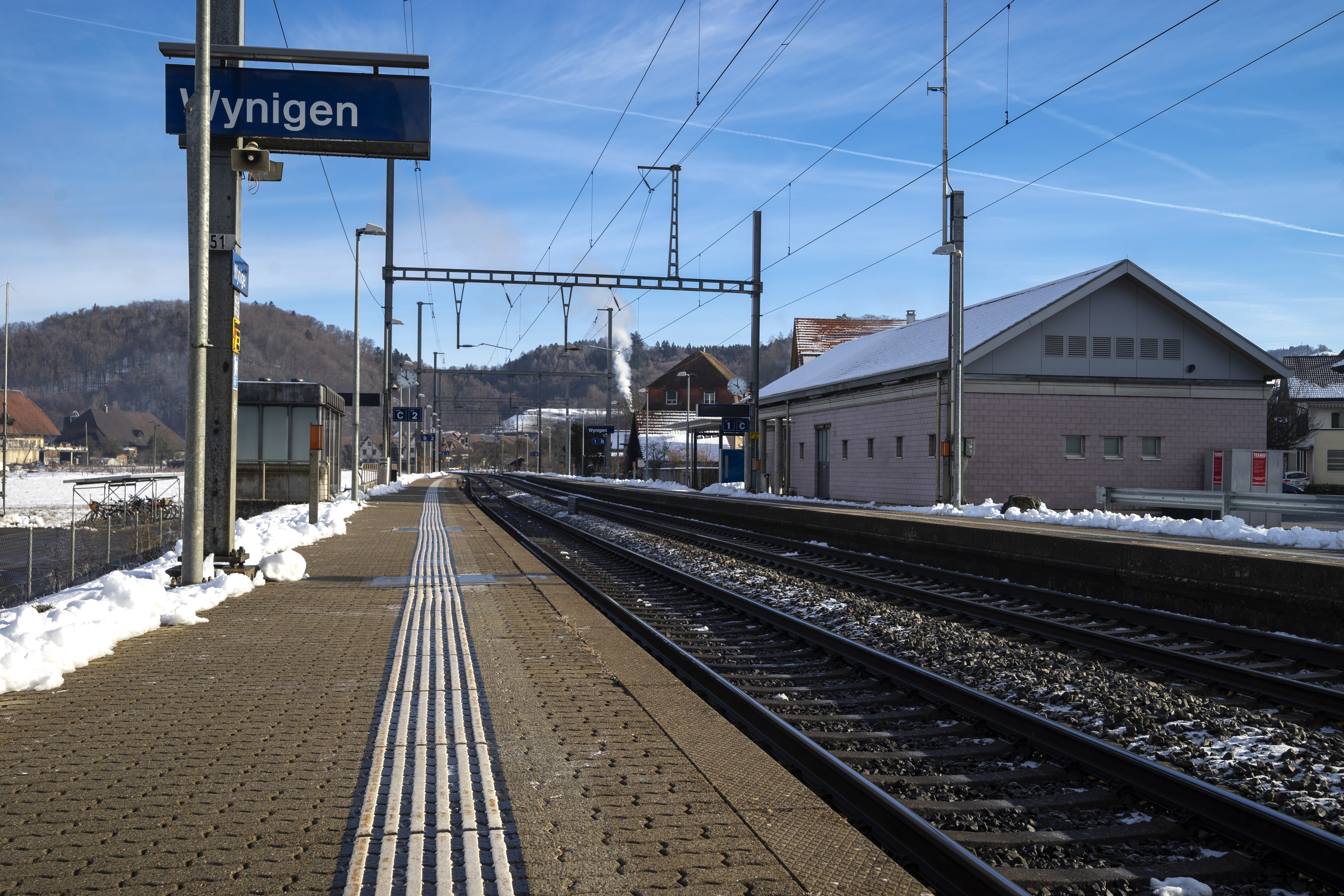
- The station platforms in 2019

General information
- Location: Wynigen; Switzerland
- Coordinates: 47°06′19″N 7°39′49″E
- Elevation: 528 m (1,732 ft)
- Owner: Swiss Federal Railways
- Line: Olten–Bern line
- Distance: 76.9 km (47.8 mi) from Basel SBB
- Platforms: 2 side platforms
- Tracks: 2
- Train operators: BLS AG
- Connections: Aare Seeland mobil bus line; Busland AG bus line

Construction
- Parking: 50
- Cycle facilities: 51
- Accessible: Partly

Other information
- Station code: 8508006 (WY)
- Fare zone: 152 (Libero)

Passengers
- 2023: 980 per weekday (BLS, SBB, SOB)

Services
Preceding station	BLS	Following station
Burgdorf towards Bern	IR 17	Herzogenbuchsee towards Olten
Location

Wynigen railway station (German: Bahnhof Wynigen) is a railway station in the municipality of Wynigen, in the Swiss canton of Bern. It is an intermediate stop on the standard gauge Olten–Bern line of Swiss Federal Railways.

== Services ==
As of the December 2023 timetable change, the following services stop at Wynigen:

- InterRegio: hourly service between Olten and Bern.
