= Burgholz railway station =

Railway station in Diemtigen, Switzerland

Burgholz
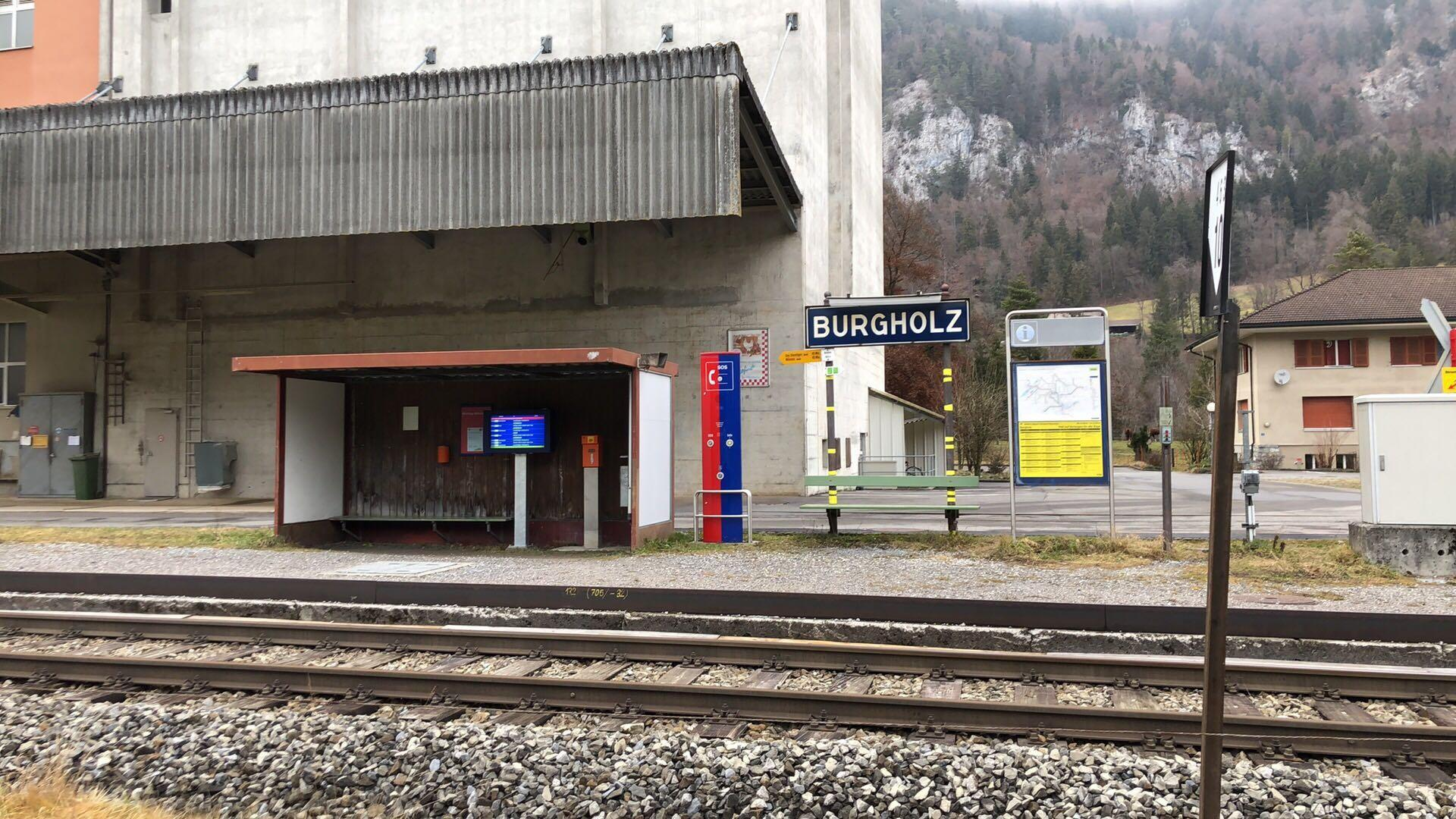
- The station platform and building in 2019, with the Mühle Burgholz AG gristmill behind

General information
- Location: Diemtigen; Switzerland
- Coordinates: 46°39′58″N 7°36′22″E
- Elevation: 644 m (2,113 ft)
- Owner: BLS AG
- Line: Spiez–Zweisimmen line
- Distance: 7.2 km (4.5 mi) from Spiez
- Platforms: 1 side platform
- Tracks: 1
- Train operators: BLS AG

Construction
- Accessible: Yes

Other information
- Station code: 8507287 (BH)
- Fare zone: 840 (Libero)

Passengers
- 2023: 60 per weekday (BLS)

Services
Preceding station	BLS	Following station
Oey-Diemtigen towards Zweisimmen	R11	Wimmis towards Bern
Location

Burgholz railway station (German: Bahnhof Burgholz) is a railway station in the municipality of Diemtigen, in the Swiss canton of Bern. It is an intermediate stop on the Spiez–Zweisimmen line and is served as a request stop by local trains only.

== Services ==
The following services stop at Burgholz:

- Regio: hourly service to Zweisimmen and Bern.
