= Herzogenbuchsee railway station =

Railway station in Herzogenbuchsee, Switzerland

Herzogenbuchsee
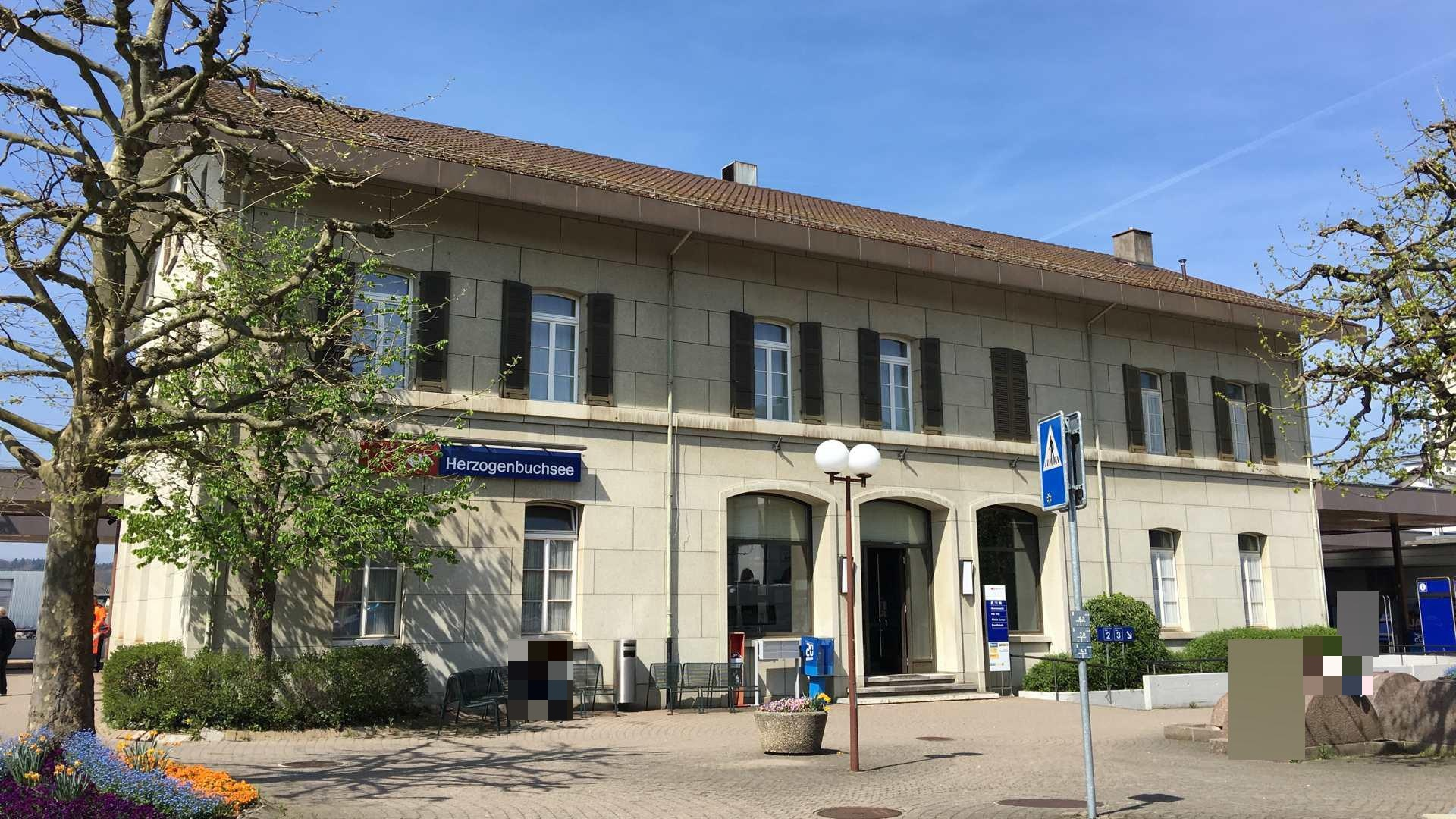
- The station building in 2017

General information
- Location: Herzogenbuchsee; Switzerland
- Coordinates: 47°11′17″N 7°42′03″E
- Elevation: 464 m (1,522 ft)
- Owner: Swiss Federal Railways
- Line: Olten–Bern line
- Distance: 66.8 km (41.5 mi) from Basel SBB
- Platforms: 2: 1 side platform; 1 island platform
- Tracks: 7
- Train operators: BLS AG; Südostbahn; Swiss Federal Railways
- Connections: Aare Seeland mobil buses; Busbetrieb Solothurn und Umgebung buses

Construction
- Parking: 99
- Cycle facilities: 512
- Accessible: Yes

Other information
- Station code: 8508008 (HB)
- Fare zone: 195 (Libero)

Passengers
- 2023: 4'000 per weekday (BLS, SBB, SOB)

Services
Preceding station	Südostbahn	Following station
Burgdorf towards Bern	IR 35 Aare Linth	Langenthal towards Chur
Preceding station	BLS	Following station
Wynigen towards Bern	IR 17	Langenthal towards Olten
Location

Herzogenbuchsee railway station (German: Bahnhof Herzogenbuchsee) is a railway station in the municipality of Herzogenbuchsee, in the Swiss canton of Bern. It is an intermediate stop on the standard gauge Olten–Bern line of Swiss Federal Railways.

== Services ==
As of the 2025 timetable change, there are 2 lines running through Herzogenbuchsee Station.

The IR17 (Olten to Bern/Bern to Olten) departing xx:24 to Bern and xx:34 to Olten.

The IR35 (Chur to Bern/Bern to Chur) departing to Bern at xx:54 and Chur xx:05.
