= Zollikofen railway station =

Railway station in Zollikofen, Switzerland

Zollikofen
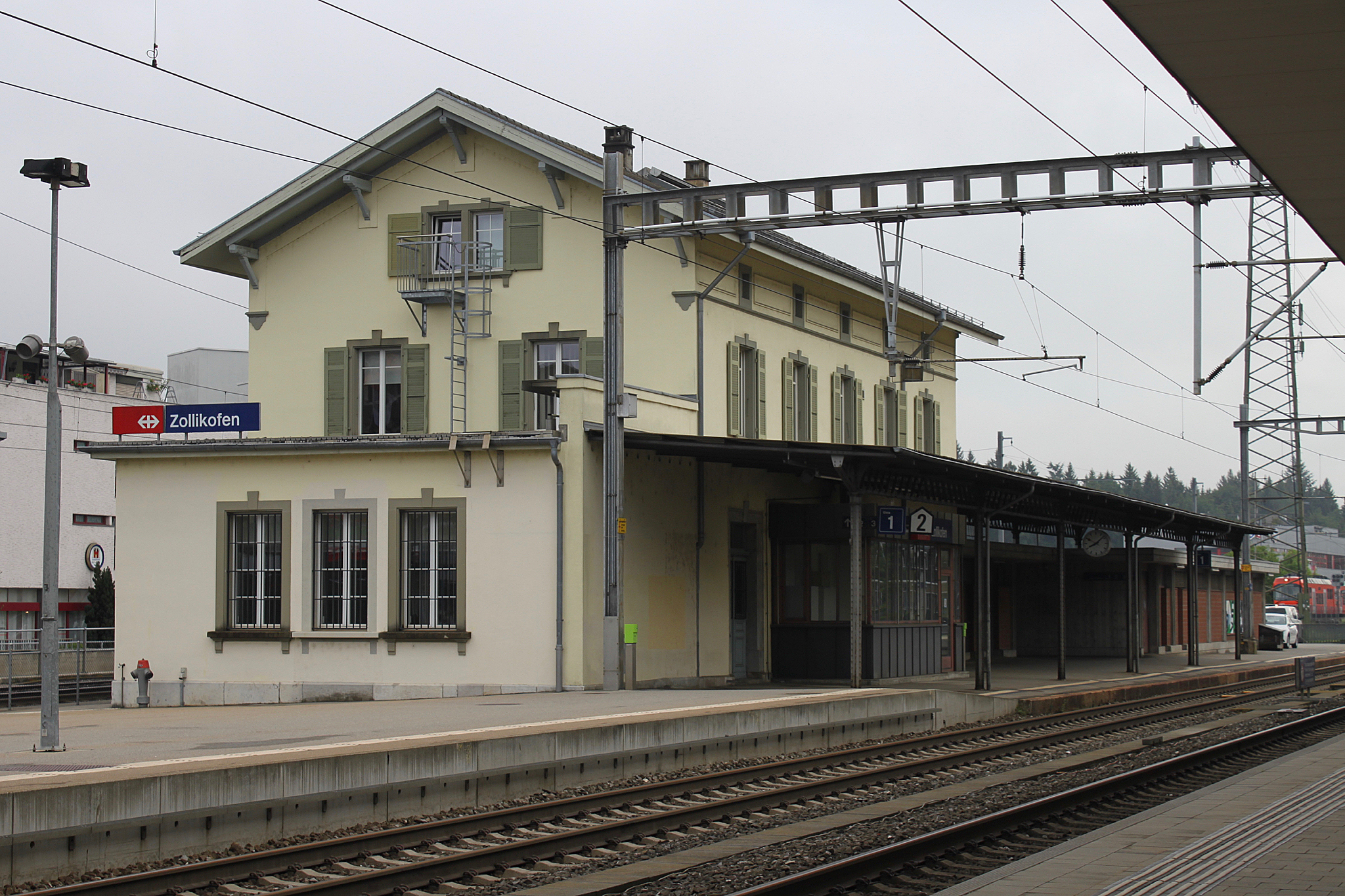
- The station building in 2018

General information
- Location: Zollikofen; Switzerland
- Coordinates: 47°00′N 7°28′E
- Elevation: 560 m (1,840 ft)
- Owner: Swiss Federal Railways
- Lines: Biel/Bienne–Bern line; Olten–Bern line; Solothurn–Worblaufen line
- Distance: 26.9 km (16.7 mi) from Solothurn; 98.8 km (61.4 mi) from Basel SBB
- Platforms: 5: 1 side platform; 2 island platforms
- Tracks: 6
- Train operators: BLS AG; Regionalverkehr Bern-Solothurn
- Connections: PostAuto AG buses; RBS buses

Construction
- Parking: Yes (32 spaces)
- Cycle facilities: Yes (215 spaces)
- Accessible: Yes

Other information
- Station code: 8504410 (ZOL)
- Fare zone: 101 and 114 (Libero)

Passengers
- 2023: 4'800 per weekday (BLS, SBB, SOB (excluding RBS))

Services
| Preceding station | Bern S-Bahn | Following station |
|---|---|---|
| Bern Wankdorf towards Belp | S3 | Münchenbuchsee towards Biel/Bienne |
| Bern Wankdorf towards Belp | S31 | Münchenbuchsee towards Biel/Bienne |
| Bern Wankdorf towards Belp | S31 | Münchenbuchsee Terminus |
| Bern Wankdorf towards Thun | S4 | Schönbühl SBB towards Langnau i.E. |
| Ostermundigen Terminus | S46 Rush-hour service | Schönbühl SBB One-way operation |
| Oberzollikofen towards Bern | S8 | Moosseedorf towards Jegenstorf or Bätterkinden |
| Preceding station | BLS | Following station |
| Gümligen One-way operation | RE11 Saturdays only | Lyss towards Biel/Bienne |
| Ostermundigen towards Brig | RE11 Weekends only | Lyss towards Biel/Bienne |
Location

Zollikofen railway station (German: Bahnhof Zollikofen) is a railway station in the municipality of Münchenbuchsee, in the Swiss canton of Bern. It is an intermediate stop on the standard gauge Biel/Bienne–Bern and Olten–Bern lines of Swiss Federal Railways and the 1,000 mm (3 ft 3 3/8 in) gauge Solothurn–Worblaufen line of Regionalverkehr Bern-Solothurn.

== Services ==
As of the December 2024 timetable change, the following services stop at Zollikofen:

- Bern S-Bahn:
  - S3: half-hourly service between Biel/Bienne and Belp.
  - S31: rush-hour service between Münchenbuchsee or Biel/Bienne and Belp.
  - S4: hourly service between Thun and Langnau.
  - S46: morning rush-hour service on weekdays to Ostermundigen.
  - S8: service every fifteen minutes between Bern and Jegenstorf and half-hourly service from Jegenstorf to Bätterkinden.
- RegioExpress : daily service on weekends during the high season to Biel/Bienne and Brig.
