= Eifeld railway station =

Railway station in Wimmis, Switzerland

Eifeld
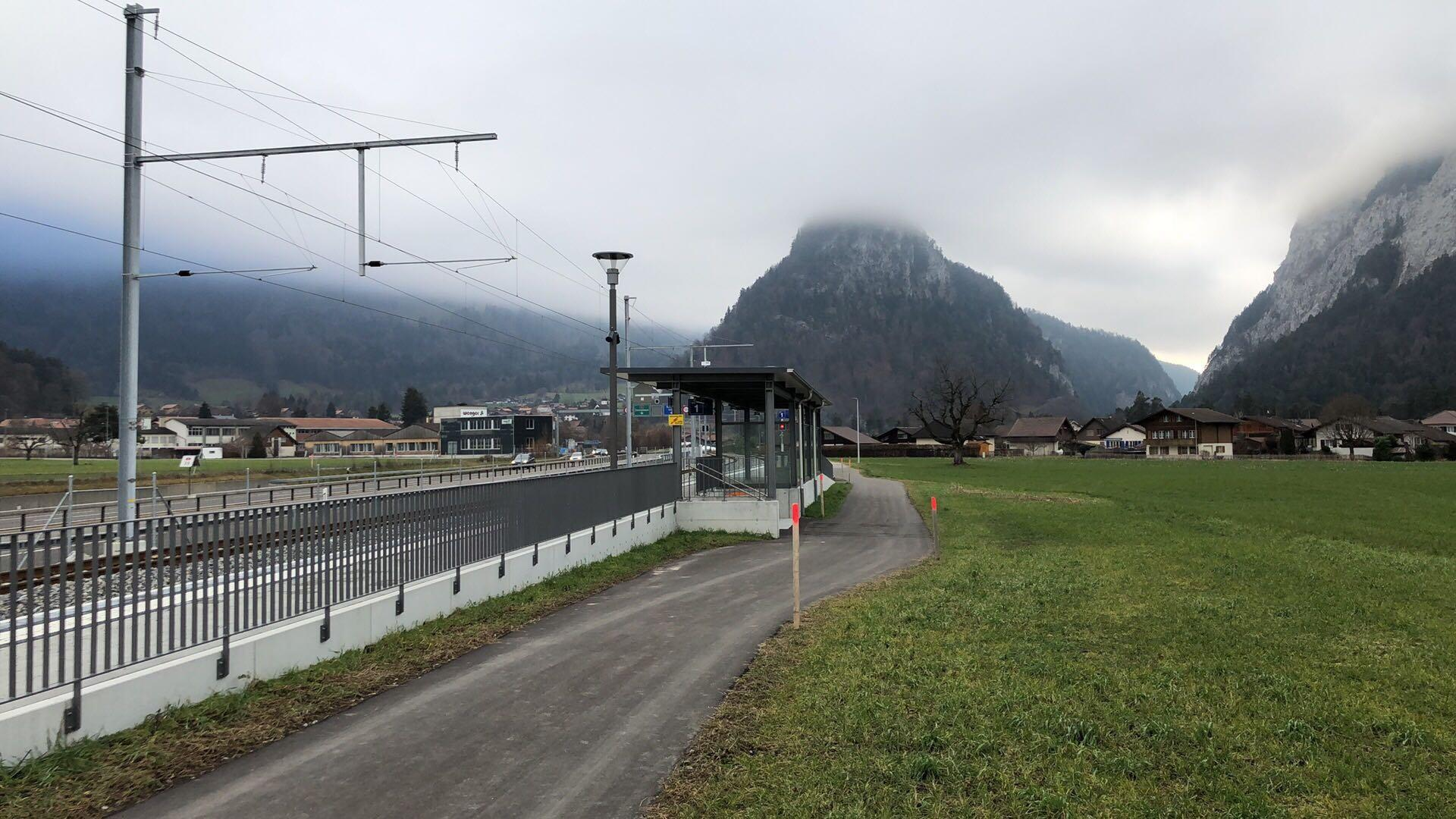
- The station platform and shelter in 2019

General information
- Location: Wimmis; Switzerland
- Coordinates: 46°41′02″N 7°38′31″E
- Elevation: 626 m (2,054 ft)
- Owner: BLS AG
- Line: Spiez–Zweisimmen line
- Distance: 3.5 km (2.2 mi) from Spiez
- Platforms: 1 side platform
- Tracks: 2
- Train operators: BLS AG

Construction
- Accessible: Yes

Other information
- Station code: 8507288 (EIF)
- Fare zone: 720 (Libero)

Passengers
- 2023: 100 per weekday (BLS)

Services
Preceding station	BLS	Following station
Wimmis towards Zweisimmen	R11	Lattigen bei Spiez towards Bern
Location

Eifeld railway station (German: Bahnhof Eifeld) is a railway station in the municipality of Wimmis, in the Swiss canton of Bern. It is an intermediate stop on the Spiez–Zweisimmen line and is served as a request stop by local trains only.

== Services ==
The following services stop at Eifeld:

- Regio: hourly service to Zweisimmen and Bern.
