= BLS RABe 528 =

Swiss passenger trainset

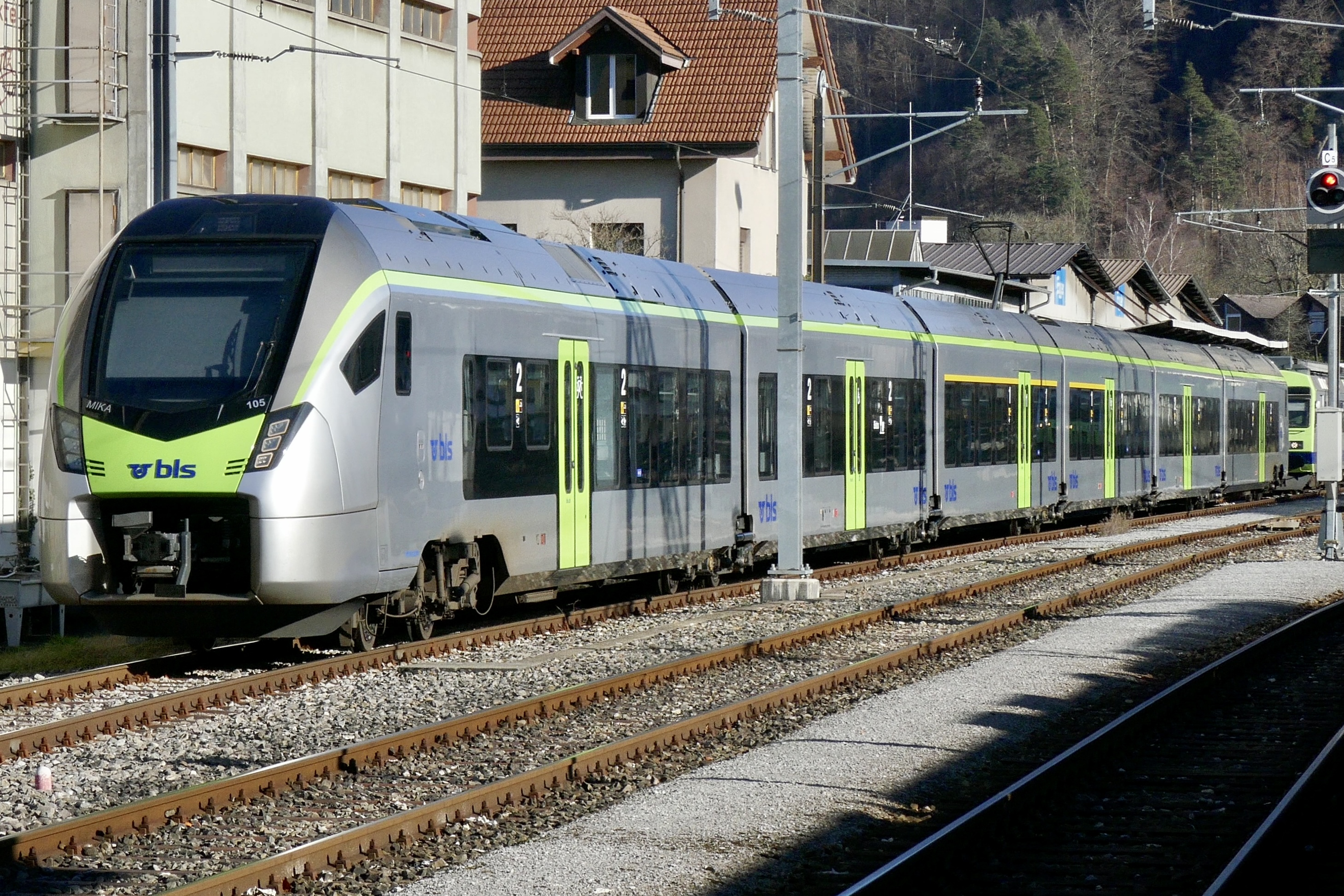
- BLS No. 105 at Burgdorf in 2022

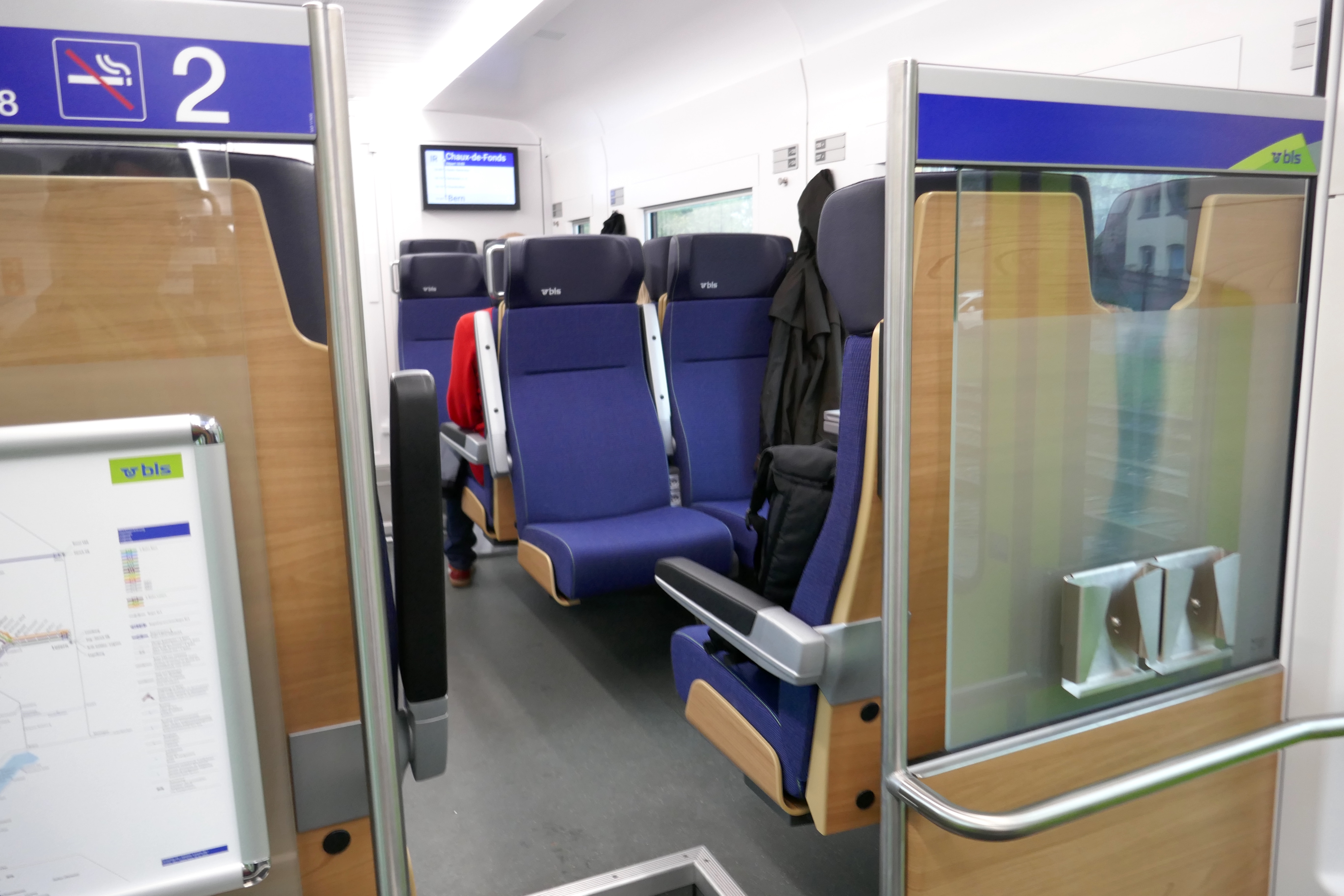
- Second class seating area
- In service: 2021–present
- Manufacturer: Stadler Rail
- Number built: 58
- Fleet numbers: 101–130 (RegioExpress); 201–228 (S-Bahn)
- Capacity: 275 seated + 200 standees
- Operator: BLS AG

Specifications
- Train length: 104,900 mm (344.2 ft)
- Width: 2,880 mm (9.45 ft)
- Height: 4,260 mm (13.98 ft)
- Articulated sections: 6
- Maximum speed: 160 km/h (99 mph)
- Electric system: 15 kV 16.7 Hz AC
- UIC classification: Bo’Bo’2’2'2’Bo’Bo’
- Track gauge: 1,435 mm (4 ft 8 1/2 in)

The BLS RABe 528, also known as MIKA, (Note: German: moderner, innovativer, kompakter Allroundzug, lit. 'modern, innovative, compact all-round train') is a class of passenger electric multiple unit manufactured by Stadler Rail for BLS AG. It is a derivative of the Stadler FLIRT and began entering service in 2021. It is comparable to the Traverso of Südostbahn.

== History ==
BLS AG ordered 58 trainsets from Stadler Rail in 2017 at a cost of CHF 650 million. BLS planned to use the trains on Bern S-Bahn services and on longer RegioExpress services. The RABe 528 will replace locomotive-hauled Einheitswagen III coaches and the RBDe 565 and RBDe 565 multiple units. The first trains entered service on 10 May 2021 on the InterRegio 66 between Bern and Neuchâtel.

== Design ==
Each formation is composed of six cars, with a maximum seating capacity of 275. They can accommodate another 200 standees. Altogether the formation is 104,900 mm (344 ft 1 15/16 in) long. Cars are 2,880 mm (9 ft 5 3/8 in) wide and 4,260 mm (13 ft 11 11/16 in) tall. The design speed is 160 km/h (99 mph). There are different internal layouts for longer-distance trains compared to S-Bahn trains but they are mechanically identical.

== Naming ==
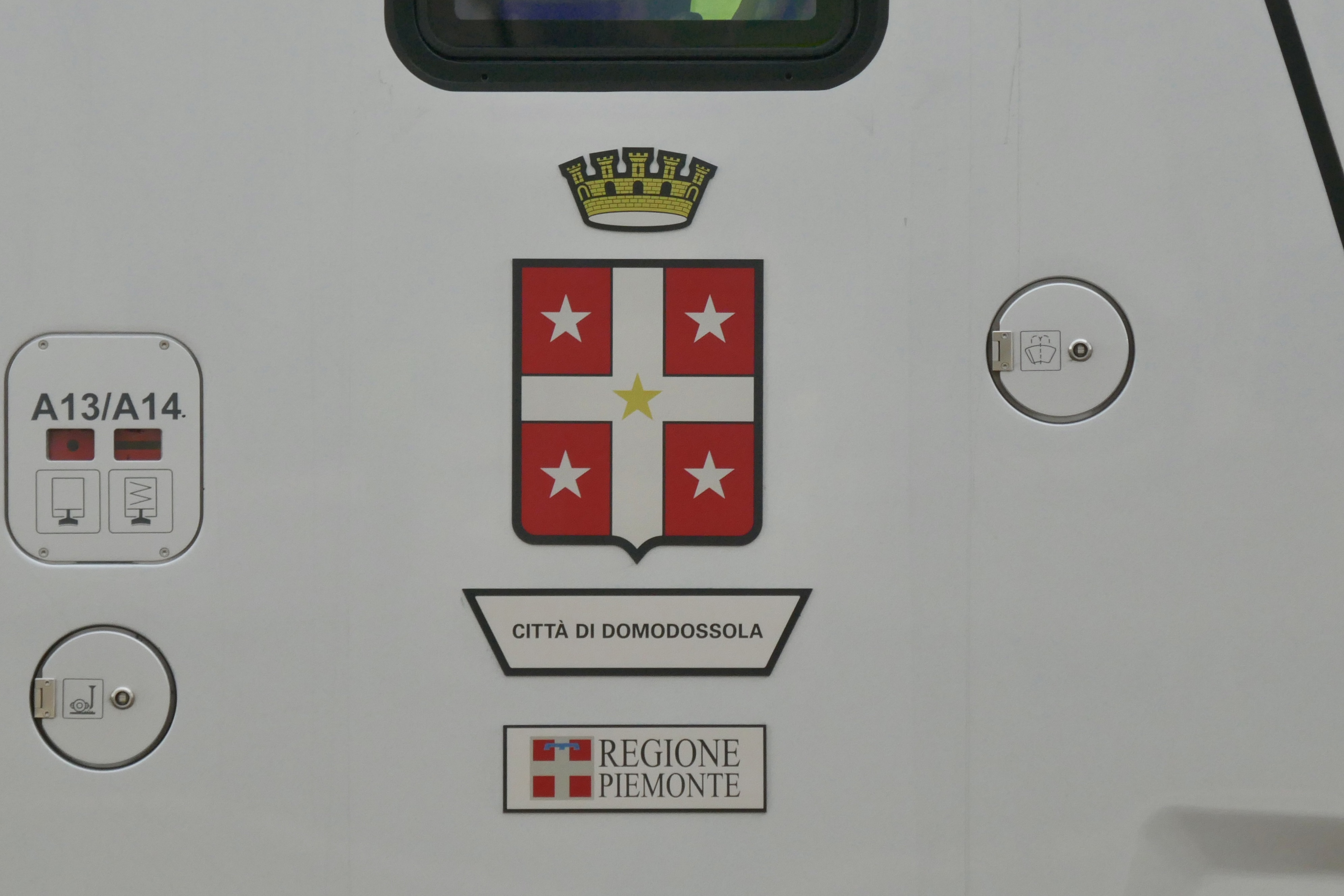
RABe 528 119 is named after Domodossola, Italy

It is common customs for Swiss railway companies to name their locomotives (e.g. SBB Re 620, BLS Re 465) and MUs (e.g. SBB RABe 501, SOB RABe 526, BLS RABe 515, BLS RABe 525). Ten BLS RABe 528 are named after communes in the Swiss cantons of Bern, Lucerne and Neuchâtel, while two additional ones are named after communes in the Italian state of Piedmont. Each train bears the commune's coat of arms (COA) below the driver's window. The list below contains only named trainsets with their respective number (№). As of 2025, RABe 528 110 has a special livery of Kambly.

№	COA	Name	№	COA	Name	№	COA	Name
528 101		Luzern	528 114		Frutigen	528 120		Wimmis
528 104		Entlebuch	528 012		Brig-Glis	528 122		Erlenbach im Simmental
528 110		Trubschachen	528 118		Commune di Varzo	528 123		Boltigen
528 111		La Chaux-de-Fonds	528 119		Città di Domodossola	528 202		Neuenegg

== See also ==
- Rail transport in Switzerland
