= Blümlisalp (ship) =

Paddle-wheel steamer

Coordinates: 46.7541°N 7.6316°E

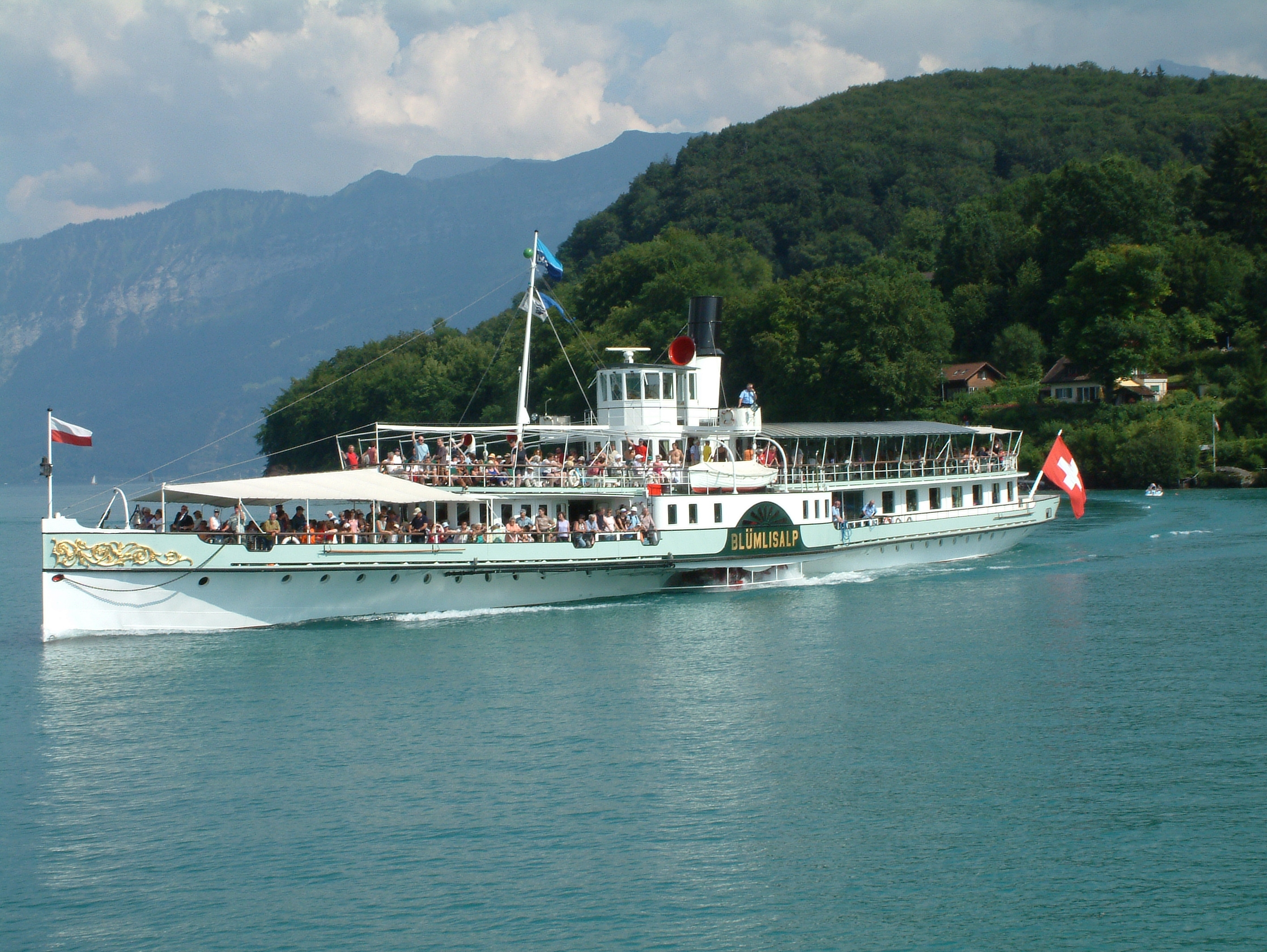
- Blümlisalp on Lake Thun

History
- Name: Blümlisalp
- Operator: BLS AG
- Builder: Escher, Wyss & Co.
- Completed: 1906
- Status: In active service

General characteristics
- Type: Paddle-wheel steamer
- Length: 60.45 m (198 ft 4 in)
- Beam: 13.15 m (43 ft 2 in)
- Draft: 1.57 m (5 ft 2 in)
- Capacity: 750 persons

The horn of the Blümlisalp

SS Blümlisalp is a paddle-wheel steamer built in 1906, used in regular passenger service on Lake Thun. She is named after the Blüemlisalp mountain massif in the Bernese Oberland. The vessel is operated by BLS AG.

== Construction and description ==
The saloon steamer was ordered in 1905 by the Oberländische Dampfschifffahrts-Gesellschaft at the company Escher, Wyss & Co. in Zurich, one of the foremost builders of locomotives and industrial machinery at the time. Ordered at a price of 375,000 Swiss francs, Blümlisalp was destined to overpass all other ships on Lake Thun and Lake Brienz in terms of size, power and elegance. Construction of the ship required some preparations, among them building a covered, 62-metre (203 ft) long shipyard and a 132-metre (433 ft) long launching facility, which together cost 165,000 francs. The ship has a main deck length of 60.45 metres (198 ft 4 in), a width of 13.15 metres (43 ft 2 in), and a draught of 1.57 metres (5 ft 2 in) when fully loaded and carrying seven tons of coal. The ship carries 800 passengers. Blümlisalp's engine, is an inclined compound marine steam engine.

== History ==
On August 1, 1971 Blümlisalp was put out of service and was slated to be scrapped. For about twenty years, the ship remained moored in the delta of the Kander River. A cooperative called "Vaporama" undertook a revision of the ship, and after more than two years of repairs and overhaul, the second maiden voyage took place on May 22, 1992. Ever since, Blümlisalp has been serving in scheduled passenger traffic between April and October.
