= Belp railway station =

Railway station in Belp, Switzerland

Belp Bahnhof Belp
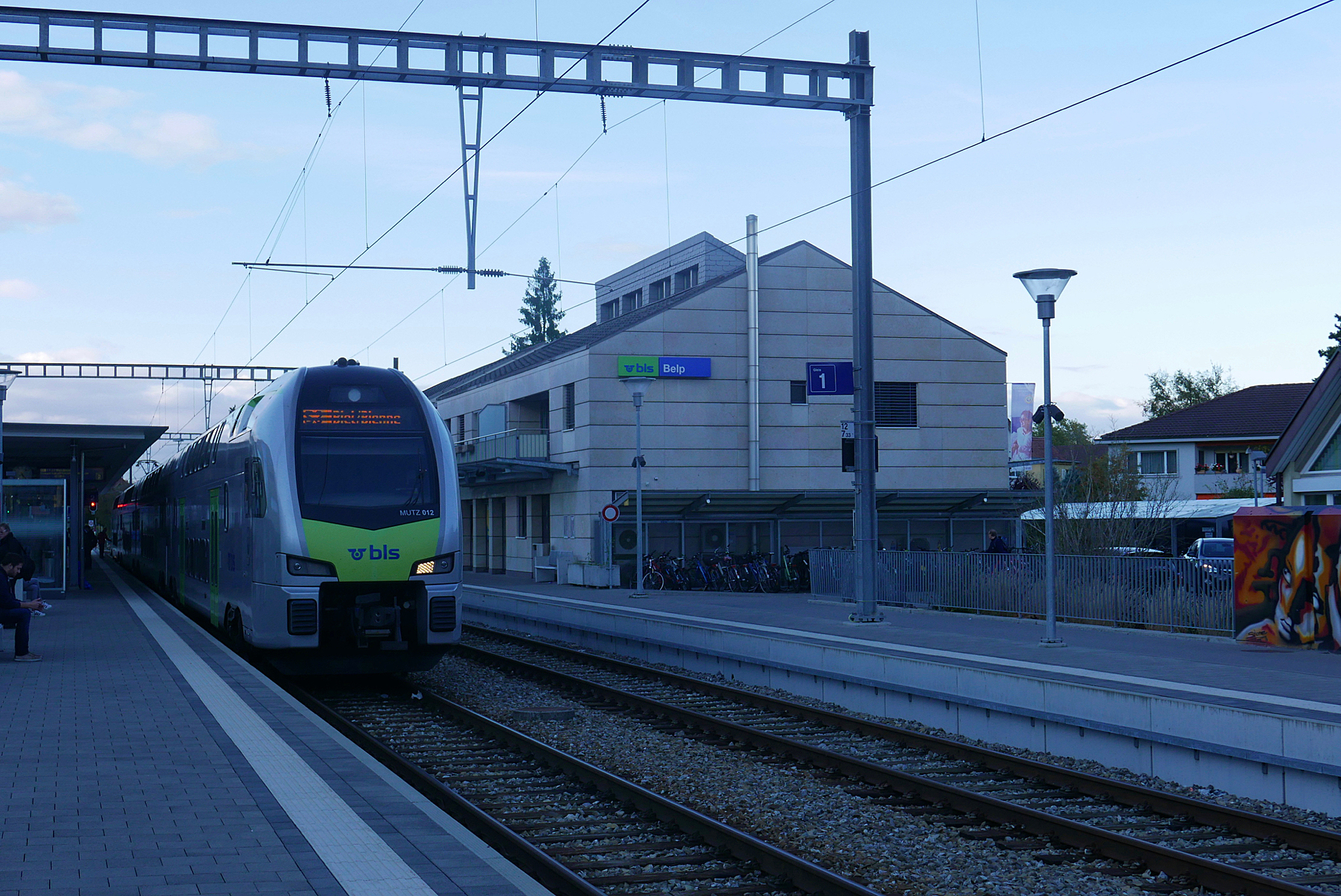
- A train arrives at the station in 2016

General information
- Location: Bahnhofplatz; Belp; Switzerland
- Coordinates: 46°53′N 7°30′E
- Elevation: 523 m (1,716 ft)
- Owner: BLS AG
- Line: Gürbetal line
- Distance: 12.6 km (7.8 mi) from Bern
- Platforms: 3: 1 island platform; 1 side platform
- Tracks: 3
- Train operators: BLS AG
- Connections: BERNMOBIL buses

Construction
- Parking: Yes (17 spaces)
- Accessible: Yes

Other information
- Station code: 8507076 (BP)
- Fare zone: 115 (Libero)

Passengers
- 2023: 5'700 per weekday (BLS)

Services
Preceding station	Bern S-Bahn	Following station
Belp Steinbach towards Biel/Bienne	S3	Terminus
Belp Steinbach towards Münchenbuchsee or Biel/Bienne	S31	Terminus
Bern towards Langnau i.E.	S4	Toffen towards Thun
Bern towards Solothurn or Sumiswald-Grünen	S44	Toffen towards Thun
Location

Belp railway station (German: Bahnhof Belp) is a railway station in the municipality of Belp, in the Swiss canton of Bern. It is an intermediate stop on the standard gauge Gürbetal line of BLS AG. A bus line links it to Bern Belp Airport.

== Services ==
As of the December 2024 timetable change, the following services stop at Belp:

- Bern S-Bahn:
  - S3: half-hourly service to Biel/Bienne.
  - S31: rush-hour service to Münchenbuchsee or Biel/Bienne.
  - S4 / S44: half-hourly service between Thun and Burgdorf and hourly service from Burgdorf to Langnau, Solothurn, or Sumiswald-Grünen.

== Gallery ==
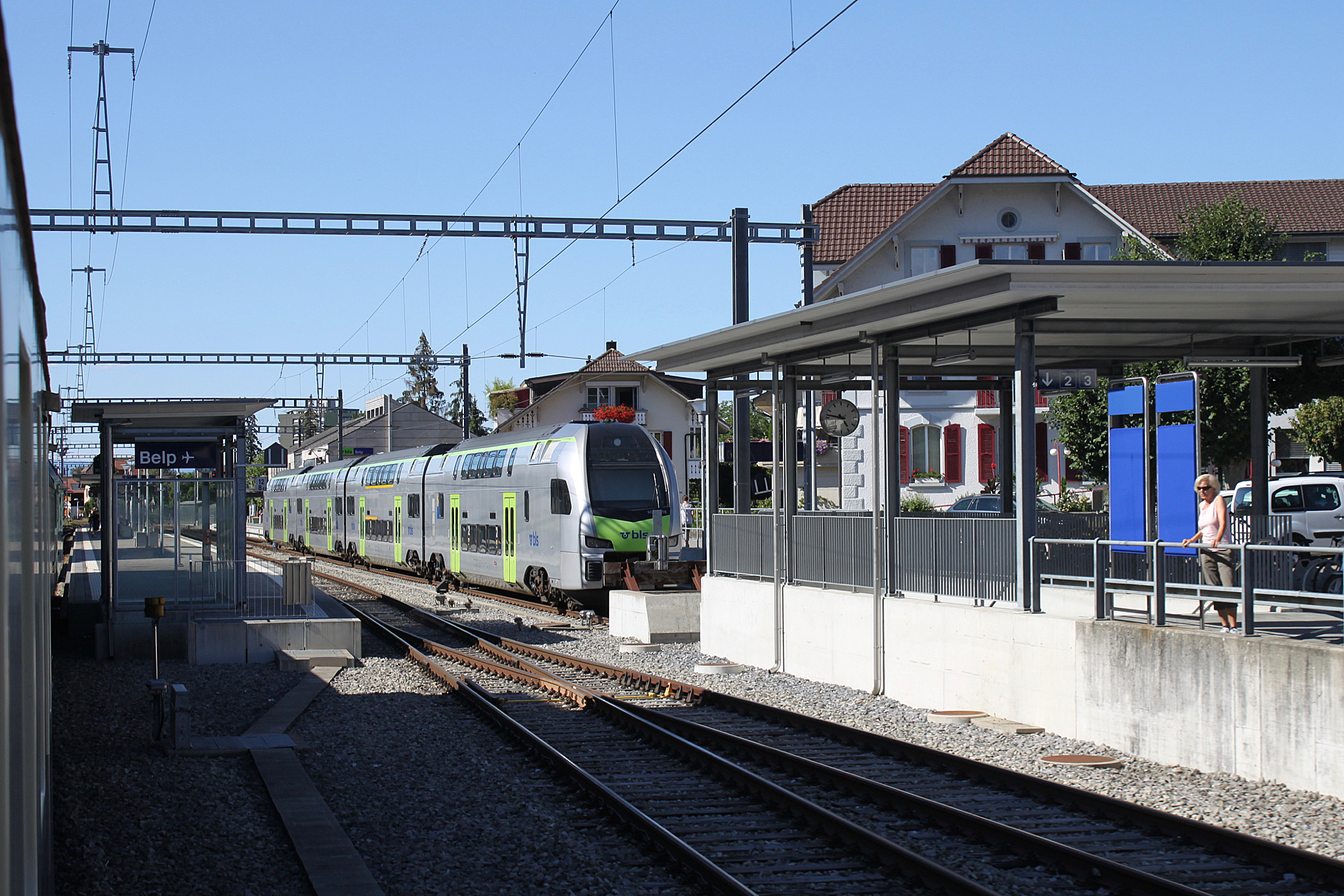
platforms (2018)

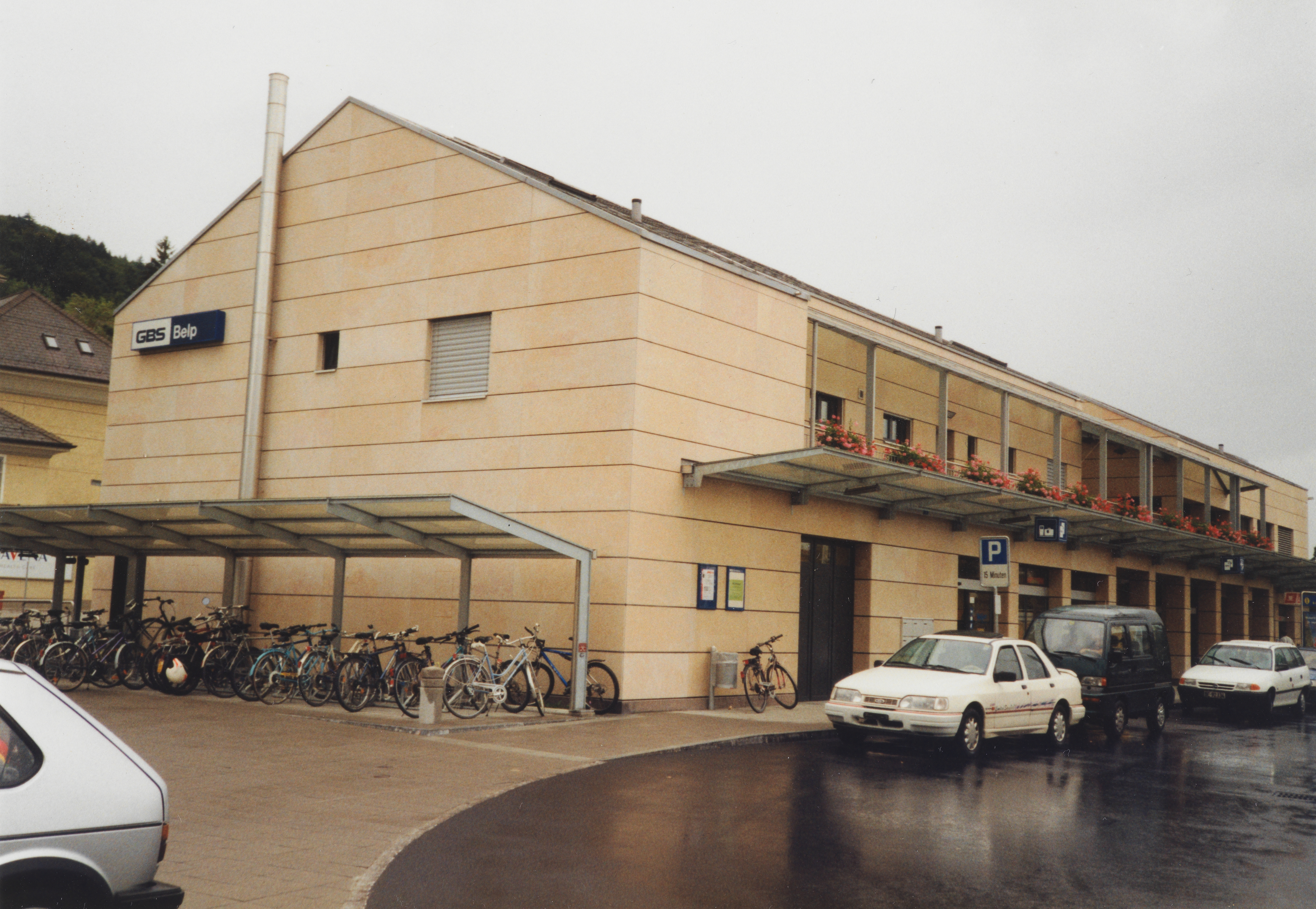
street-side (1998)

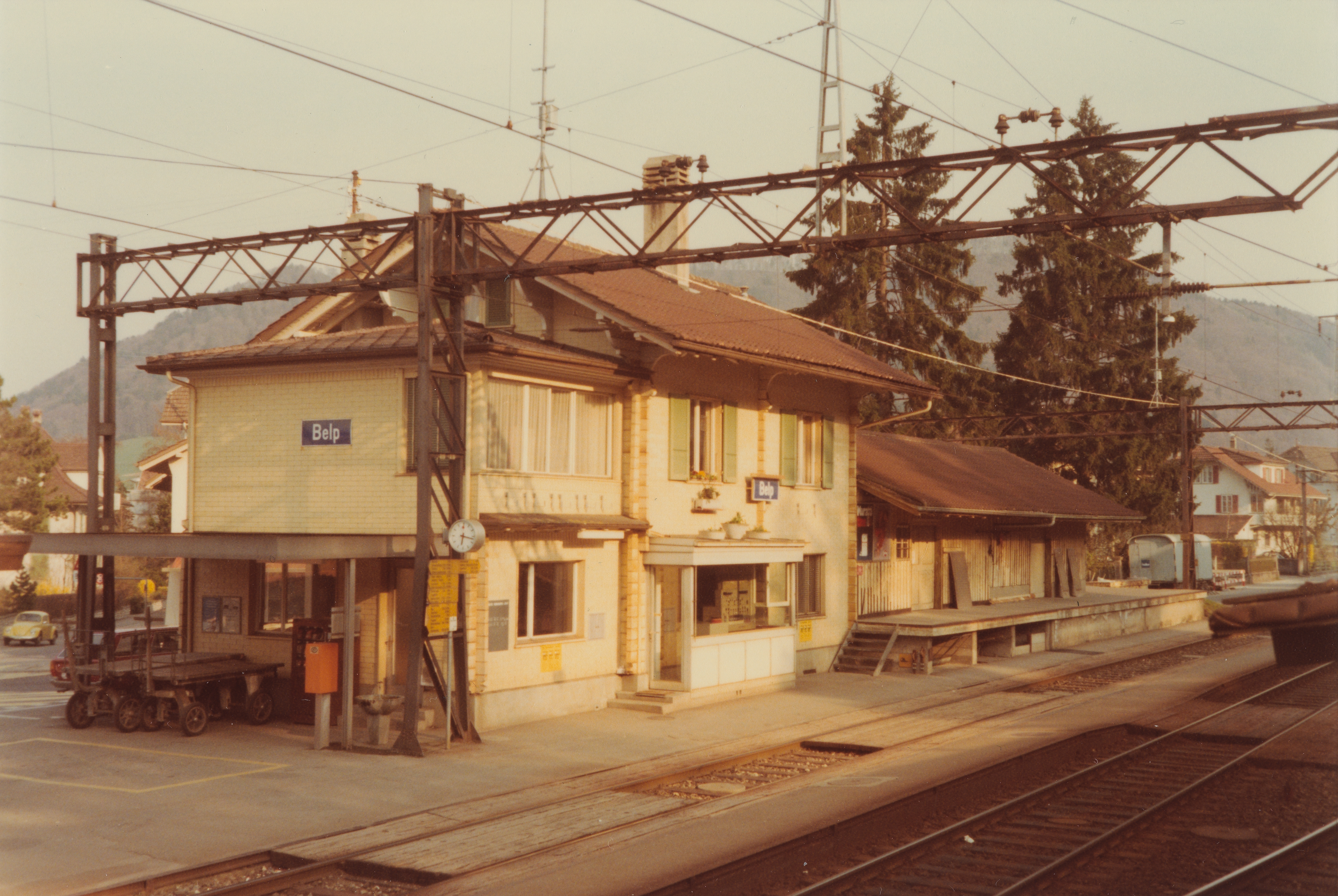
old station building and goods shed (1982)
