= Münchenbuchsee railway station =

Railway station in Münchenbuchsee, Switzerland

Münchenbuchsee
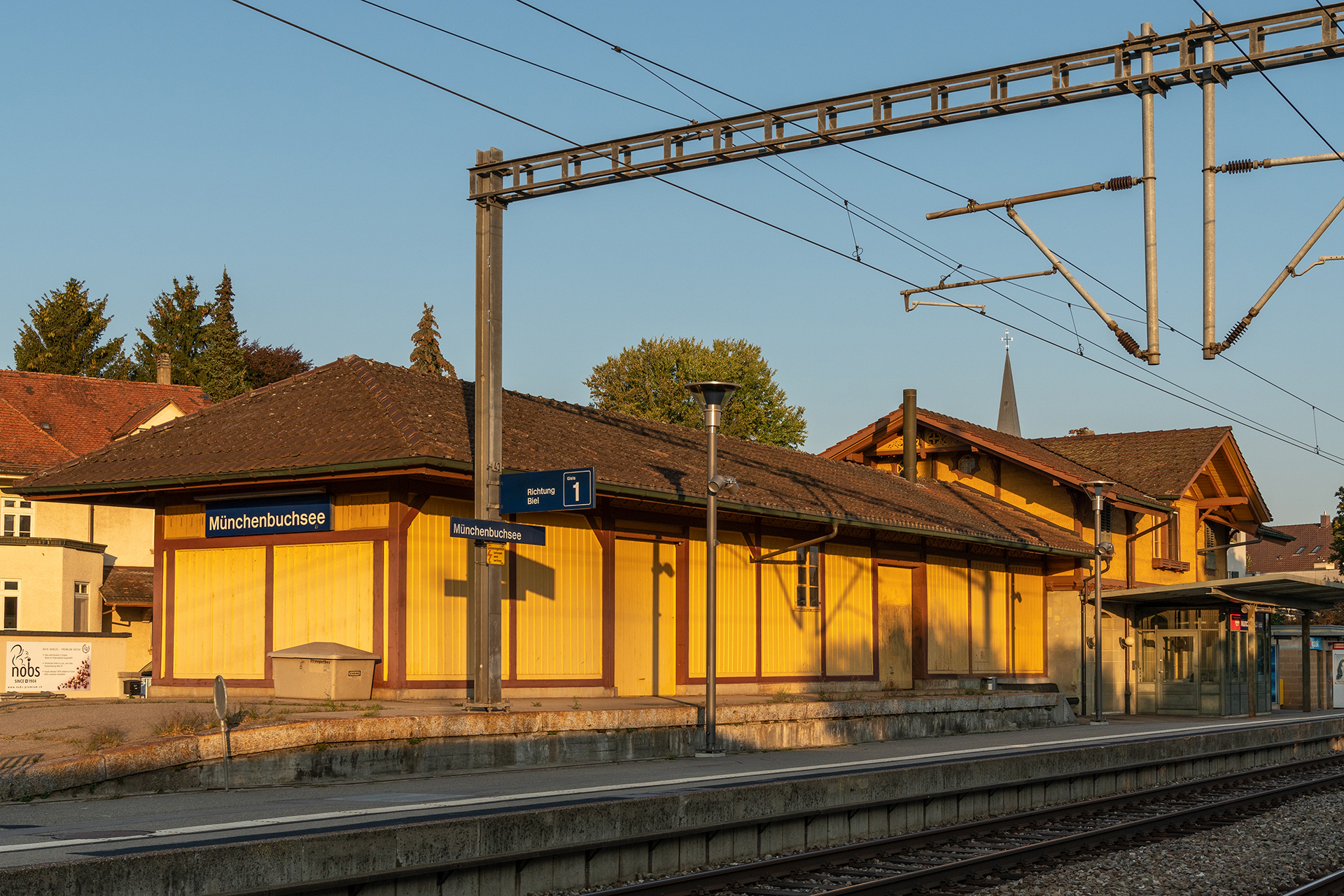
- The station building in 2018

General information
- Location: Münchenbuchsee; Switzerland
- Coordinates: 47°01′17″N 7°27′07″E
- Elevation: 554 m (1,818 ft)
- Owner: Swiss Federal Railways
- Line: Biel/Bienne–Bern line
- Platforms: 2 side platforms
- Tracks: 2
- Train operators: BLS AG
- Connections: RBS bus line

Construction
- Parking: Yes (87 spaces)
- Cycle facilities: Yes (232 spaces)
- Accessible: Yes

Other information
- Station code: 8504411 (MUEB)
- Fare zone: 114 (Libero)

Passengers
- 2023: 4'200 per weekday (BLS)

Services
| Preceding station | Bern S-Bahn | Following station |
|---|---|---|
| Schüpfen towards Biel/Bienne | S3 | Zollikofen towards Belp |
| Schüpfen towards Biel/Bienne | S31 | Zollikofen towards Belp |
| Terminus | S31 | Zollikofen towards Belp |
Location

Münchenbuchsee railway station (German: Bahnhof Münchenbuchsee) is a railway station in the municipality of Münchenbuchsee, in the Swiss canton of Bern. It is an intermediate stop on the standard gauge Biel/Bienne–Bern line of Swiss Federal Railways.

== Services ==
As of the December 2024 timetable change, the following services stop at Münchenbuchsee:

- Bern S-Bahn:
  - S3: half-hourly service between Biel/Bienne and Belp.
  - S31: rush-hour service to Biel/Bienne and Belp.
