= Regionalverkehr Mittelland =

Regionalverkehr Mittelland AG (RM) was a 1997 merger of

- EBT - Emmental–Burgdorf–Thun-Bahn
- VHB - Vereinigte Huttwil-Bahnen
- SMB - Solothurn–Münster-Bahn

which had been under common management since 1943.

In 2006, the main owners of RM and BLS Lötschbergbahn, the canton of Bern and the Swiss Confederation merged the two companies, forming the new BLS AG.
