= Burgdorf railway station =

Railway station in Burgdorf, Switzerland

Burgdorf
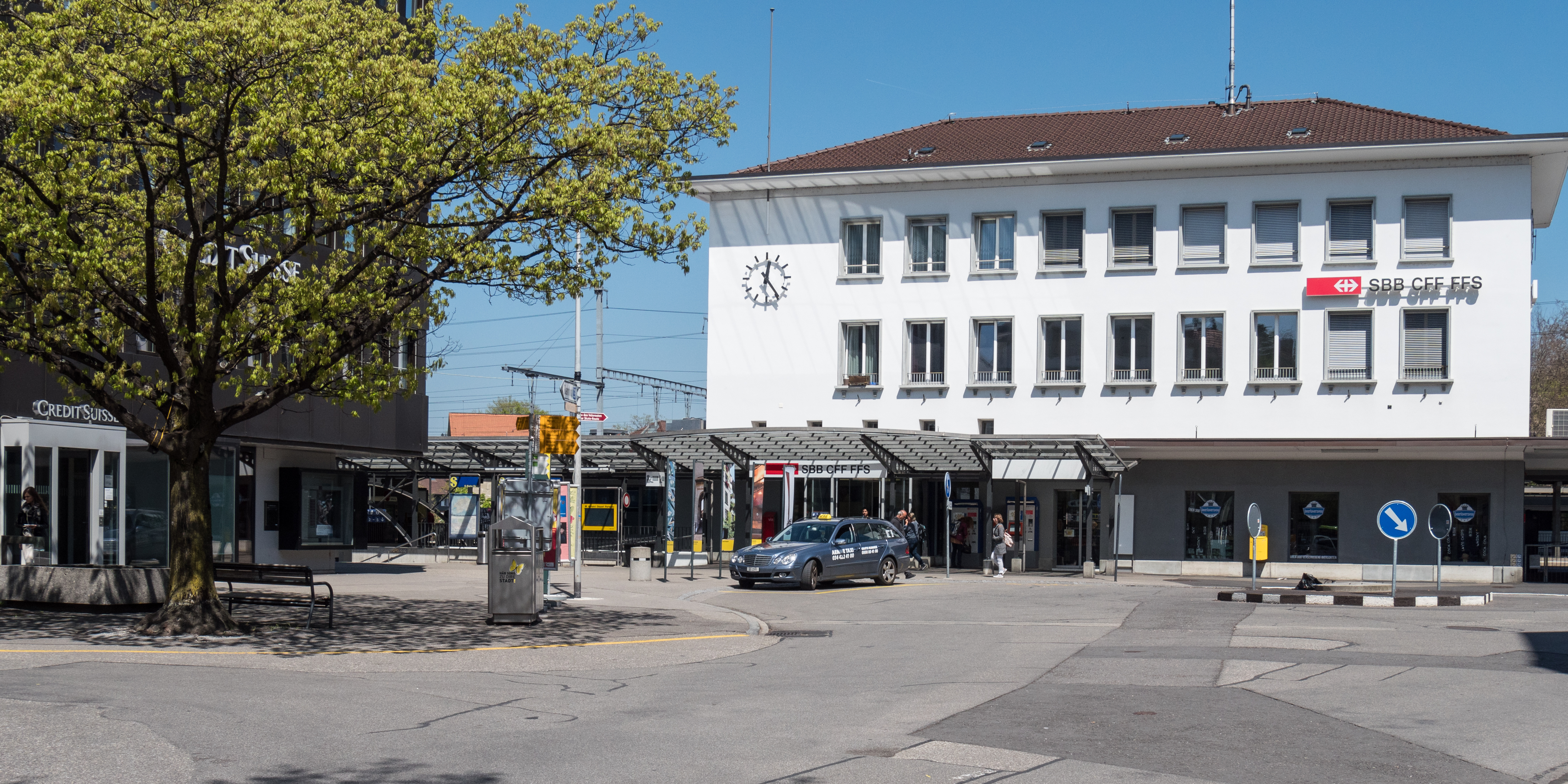
- The station building in 2019

General information
- Location: Burgdorf; Switzerland
- Coordinates: 47°03′38″N 7°37′18″E
- Elevation: 533 m (1,749 ft)
- Owner: Swiss Federal Railways
- Lines: Burgdorf–Thun line; Olten–Bern line; Solothurn–Langnau line
- Distance: 20.7 km (12.9 mi) from Solothurn; 83.4 km (51.8 mi) from Basel SBB
- Platforms: 6 (3 island platforms)
- Tracks: 6
- Train operators: BLS AG; Südostbahn; Swiss Federal Railways
- Connections: Busland AG buses

Construction
- Parking: Yes (108 spaces)
- Cycle facilities: Yes
- Accessible: Partly

Other information
- Station code: 8508005 (BDF)
- Fare zone: 150 (Libero)

Passengers
- 2025: 16,000 per day (BLS, SBB, SOB)
- Rank: 52 out of 1,095 (Note: Tied with Geneva Airport railway station and Sargans railway station.)

Services
Preceding station	Südostbahn	Following station
Bern Terminus	IR 35 Aare Linth	Herzogenbuchsee towards Chur
Preceding station	BLS	Following station
Bern Terminus	IR 17	Wynigen towards Olten
Preceding station	Bern S-Bahn	Following station
Burgdorf Buchmatt towards Solothurn	S41	Reverses direction
Burgdorf Steinhof towards Thun	S41	Reverses direction
Lyssach towards Thun	S4	Reverses direction
Burgdorf Steinhof towards Langnau i.E.	S4	Reverses direction
Burgdorf Steinhof towards Thun	S42 Limited service	Terminus
Burgdorf Buchmatt towards Solothurn	S44	Reverses direction
Lyssach towards Thun	S44	Reverses direction
Burgdorf Steinhof towards Sumiswald-Grünen	S44	Reverses direction
Burgdorf Buchmatt One-way operation	S46 Rush-hour service	Reverses direction
Lyssach towards Ostermundigen	S46 Rush-hour service	Reverses direction
Location

Burgdorf railway station (German: Bahnhof Burgdorf; French: Gare de Berthoud) is a railway station in the municipality of Burgdorf, in the Swiss canton of Bern. It sits at the junction of three the standard gauge railway lines: the Olten–Bern line of Swiss Federal Railways and the Burgdorf–Thun and Solothurn–Langnau lines of BLS AG.

== Services ==
As of the December 2024 timetable change, the following services stop at Burgdorf:

- InterRegio: half-hourly service between Bern and Olten; trains continue to Chur via Zürich Hauptbahnhof every hour.
- Bern S-Bahn S4/S44: half-hourly service to Thun and hourly service to Langnau i.E., Solothurn, or Sumiswald-Grünen.
  - S41: hourly service between Thun and Solothurn.
  - S42: limited service to Thun.
  - S46: morning rush-hour service on weekdays to Ostermundigen.
