= Bern S-Bahn =

Commuter rail network in Switzerland

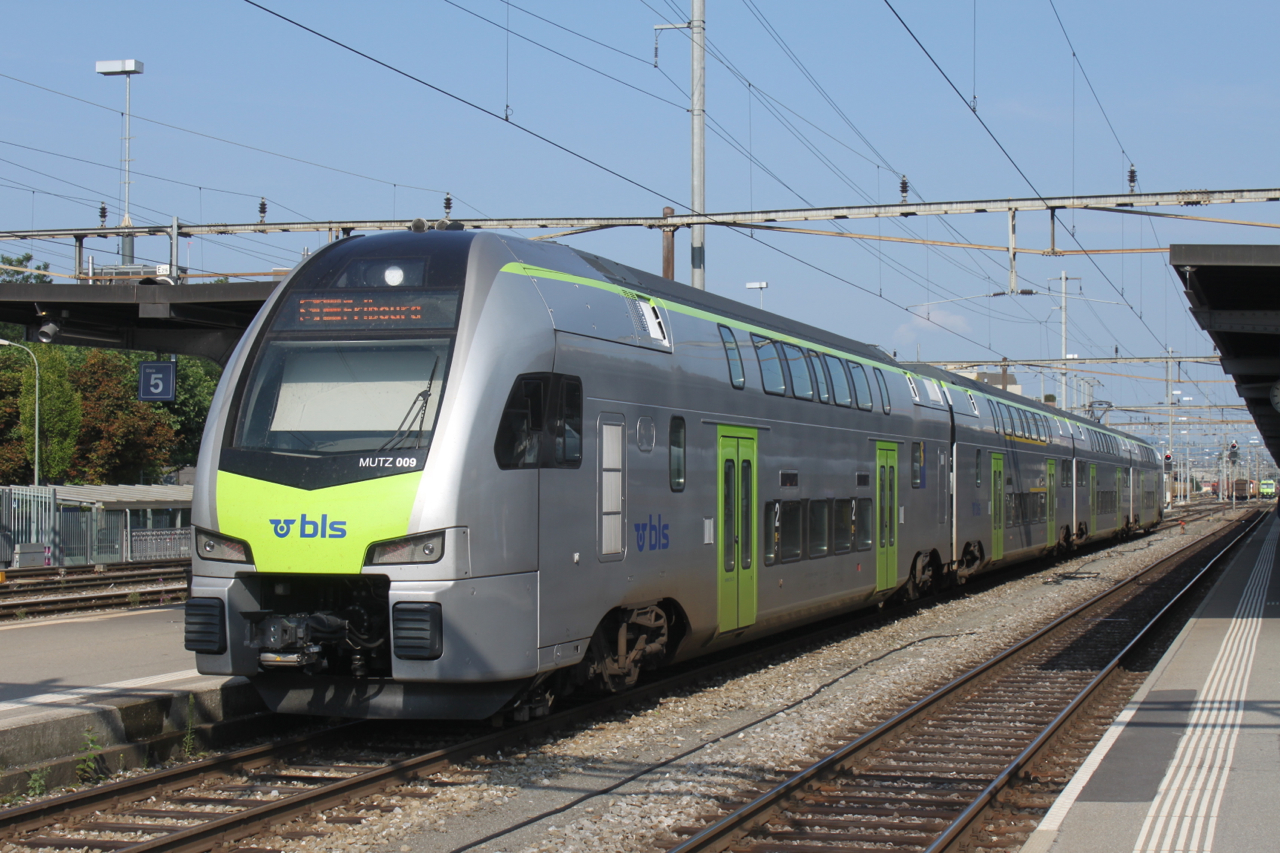
- A BLS S-Bahn train at Thun in 2013

Overview
- Locale: Bern, Switzerland
- Transit type: S-Bahn
- Number of lines: 13
- Daily ridership: 175,000 (weekdays)
- Website: S-Bahn Bern (in German)

Operation
- Began operation: 1974; 52 years ago (Bern); 1995; 31 years ago (regional)
- Operators: BLS AG; Regionalverkehr Bern-Solothurn (RBS)

Technical
- Track gauge: 1,435 mm (4 ft 8 1/2 in) (BLS); 1,000 mm (3 ft 3 3/8 in) (RBS)
Bern S-Bahn

The Bern S-Bahn (German: S-Bahn Bern; French: RER Berne) is an S-Bahn commuter rail network focused on Bern, the federal city of Switzerland. The network is roughly coterminous with Bern's urban agglomeration. Its services connect with those of Lucerne S-Bahn, RER Fribourg, RER Vaud and transN.

With approximately 9 million train kilometres per year, the Bern S-Bahn is the second-largest S-Bahn in Switzerland. It handles around 100,000 passengers daily (175,000 on weekdays), and thus carries the majority of the agglomeration's regional public transport traffic.

== Operations ==
The Bern S-Bahn Bern is operated, under a joint commission from the Canton of Bern, its neighbouring cantons and the Federal Government, by the following railway companies:

- BLS AG (BLS);
- Regionalverkehr Bern-Solothurn (RBS).

Upon the timetable change on 12 December 2004, the Swiss Federal Railways (SBB-CFF-FFS) withdrew from its previous involvement in the operation of the Bern S-Bahn, but also took over all of the long-distance services previously operated by the BLS.

=== Lines ===
As of December 2024, the network consists of the following lines. Unless otherwise stated, the lines are 1,435 mm or 4 ft 8 1/2 in standard gauge.

#	Route	Notes	Operator	Track owner
S1	Fribourg/Freiburg–Bern–Münsingen–Thun		BLS AG	SBB
S11	Thun-Bern	Rush-hour service only in direction of Bern	BLS AG	SBB
S2	Laupen BE–Flamatt–Bern–Konolfingen–Langnau i.E.		BLS AG	SBB
S21	Thun-Konolfingen		BLS AG	BLS AG
S22	Bern-Konolfingen-Langnau i.E.	Rush-hour service	BLS AG	BLS AG
S3	Biel/Bienne–Bern–Belp		BLS AG	SBB/BLS AG
S31	Belp–Bern–Münchenbuchsee(–Biel/Bienne)	Rush-hour service	BLS AG	SBB/BLS AG
S35	Kerzers-Lyss		BLS AG	SBB
S36	Lyss-Büren an der Aare		BLS AG	SBB
S4	Thun–Belp–Bern–Burgdorf–Hasle-Rüegsau–Langnau i.E.		BLS AG	SBB/BLS AG
S41	Thun–Hasle-Rüegsau–Burgdorf–Solothurn		BLS AG	BLS AG
S42	Konolfingen–Hasle-Rüegsau–Thun		BLS AG	BLS AG
S44	Thun–Belp–Bern–Burgdorf–Solothurn/Hasle-Rüegsau-Sumiswald-Grünen	Operates as a single train between Thun and Burgdorf	BLS AG	SBB/BLS AG
S45	Ramsei–Sumiswald-Grünen		BLS AG	BLS AG
S46	Solothurn–Burgdorf–Zollikofen-Ostermundigen	Rush-hour service only in direction of Ostermundigen	BLS AG	SBB/BLS AG
S5	Neuchâtel–Ins/Avenches–Murten/Morat–Kerzers–Bern Brünnen Westside–Bern	Operates as a single train between Bern and Kerzers	BLS AG	BLS AG
S51	Bern Brünnen Westside–Bern		BLS AG	BLS AG
S52	(Ins–)/(Payerne–)Murten/Morat−Kerzers–Bern Brünnen Westside–Bern	Operates between Ins and Kerzers only during rush hour	BLS AG	BLS AG
S6	Schwarzenburg–Bern		BLS AG	BLS AG
S7	Bern–Worb Dorf	Operates over the metre (3 ft 3 3/8 in) gauge Worb Dorf–Worblaufen line	RBS	RBS
S8	Bern–Jegenstorf/Bätterkinden	Operates over the metre (3 ft 3 3/8 in) gauge Solothurn–Worblaufen line	RBS	RBS
S9	Bern–Unterzollikofen	Operates over the metre (3 ft 3 3/8 in) gauge Zollikofen–Bern line	RBS	RBS

== Rolling stock ==
The normal rolling stock rosters for the Bern S-Bahn are:

- S1 BLS RABe 515 ("MUTZ"): up to two units per train (2 x 4- double-decker car EMU)
- S11 BLS RABe 515 ("MUTZ"): (6 car EMU)
- S2 BLS RABe 528 ("MIKA"): (up to two units per train (2 x 6 cars EMU))
- S21 BLS RABe 535 ("Lötschberger")
- S22 BLS RABe 535 ("Lötschberger")
- S3 BLS RABe 515 ("MUTZ"): up to two units per train (2 x 4- double-decker car EMU)
- S31 BLS RABe 515 ("MUTZ"): up to two units per train (2 x 4- double-decker car EMU)
- S35 BLS RBDe 565 ("NPZ") with two "B6 Jumbo" intermediate cars or BLS RBDe 566 II ("NPZ")
- S36 BLS RABe 525 ("NINA")
- S4 BLS RABe 528 ("MIKA") (up to two units per train (2 x 6 cars EMU))
- S41 BLS RABe 535 ("Lötschberger")
- S42 BLS RABe 525 ("NINA")
- S44 BLS RABe 525 ("NINA") or BLS RABe 535 ("Lötschberger"): 1-2 units per train (4 cars EMU)
- S45 BLS RABe 525 ("NINA") or BLS RABe 535 ("Lötschberger")
- S46 BLS RABe 525 ("NINA")
- S5 BLS RABe 525 ("NINA") or : 1–3 units per train (3 cars EMU)
- S51 BLS RBDe 565 ("NPZ") with two "B6 Jumbo" intermediate cars
- S52 BLS RBDe 565 ("NPZ") with two "B6 Jumbo" intermediate cars
- S6 BLS RABe 515 ("MUTZ")
- S7 RBS Be 4/10 ("Worbla"): in peak times 2 x Be 4/10,
- S7 supplementary trains Bern–Bolligen RBS Be 4/10 ("Worbla")
- S8 RBS Be 4/12 ("Seconda"): 2 EMU per train in peak hours, 1 EMU outside of peak hours
- S9 RBS Be 4/12 ("Seconda") or RBS Be 4/10 ("Worbla")

== History ==
=== 1970s & 80s ===
As early as 1974, Vereinigte Bern–Worb-Bahnen (VBW), forerunner of Regionalverkehr Bern-Solothurn (RBS), began operating S-Bahn-style clock-face schedule services in the Bern area. The next step came in 1987, when Swiss Federal Railways (SBB) began running trains from Thun through Bern to Laupen BE or Fribourg/Freiburg on a half-hourly schedule.

=== 1990s ===
The second line began operation on 28 May 1995, operating from Schwarzenburg to Trubschachen. At this time the "S"-style designations were introduced to differentiate the lines.

The next expansion occurred in 1998, with the commissioning of the S3 (Biel/Bienne−Belp) and the S4 (Bern–Bern Bümpliz Nord−Burgdorf and beyond). The S33 and S44 supplemented service on the S3 and S4, while the S5 designation was applied to regional services between Bern and Neuchâtel. Also introduced was the S55 for services from Bern to Murten/Morat via Kerzers.

=== 2005 ===
The December 2004 timetable change saw major expansions of the Bern S-Bahn concept. This was partly enabled by infrastructure improvements carried out under the Rail 2000 program. The three RBS lines were formally incorporated into the network, SBB transferred the operation of the S1 and S3 to the Bern-Lötschberg-Simplon-Bahn (BLS). The network now consisted of the following services:

Number	Route	Frequency	Operator
S1	Fribourg/Laupen BE–Flamatt–Bern–Thun	Every 30 minutes	BLS
S11	Bern–Fribourg	Rush-hour	BLS
S2	Schwarzenburg–Bern–Langnau i.E.	Every 30 minutes	BLS
S22	Schwarzenburg–Bern	Rush-hour	BLS
S3	Biel/Bienne–Bern–Belp	Every 30 minutes	BLS
S33	Bern–Belp–Thun	Every 30 minutes	BLS
S4	Rosshäusern–Bern–Burgdorf–Affoltern-Weier	Every 60 minutes	RM
S44	Rosshäusern–Bern–Burgdorf–Langnau i.E./Wiler	Every 60 minutes	RM
S5	Bern–Kerzers–Neuchâtel/Murten (–Payerne)	Every 60 minutes	BLS
S51	Bern–Bern Bümpliz Nord	Rush-hour	BLS
S7	Bern–Bolligen–Worb Dorf	Every 15 minutes	RBS
S8	Bern–Jegenstorf	Every 15 minutes	RBS
S9	Bern–Unterzollikofen	Every 15 minutes	RBS

=== 2009 ===
The December 2008 timetable change saw several major alterations to the standard gauge part of the network. On the Lausanne–Bern line, the S11 was eliminated, and the S1 began operating half-hourly between Flamatt and Fribourg and skipping most local stops between Flamatt and Niederwangen. The S2's western terminus was changed from Schwarzenburg to Laupen BE. On the Bern–Schwarzenburg railway line, the new S6 replaced the S2 and S22, offering a half-hourly service between Schwarzenburg and Bern. On the Bern–Neuchâtel line, the new S52 replaced the S4 and S44 between Bern and Rosshäusern, and was extended to Kerzers, while the S51 was increased to half-hourly service and extended to the new station at Bern Brünnen Westside. The S4 and S44 were re-routed over the Bern–Belp–Thun line to Thun via Belp, in place of the S33.

Number	Route	Frequency	Operator
S1	Fribourg–Bern–Thun	Every 30 minutes	BLS (Note: BLS Lötschbergbahn and Regionalverkehr Mittelland merged in 2006 to form BLS AG, also commonly known as BLS.)
S2	Laupen BE–Bern–Langnau i.E.	Every 30 minutes	BLS
S3	Biel/Bienne–Bern–Belp (–Thun)	Every 30 minutes	BLS
S4	Thun–Bern–Burgdorf–Affoltern-Weier	Every 60 minutes	BLS
S44	Thun–Bern–Burgdorf–Langnau i.E./Wiler	Every 60 minutes	BLS
S5	Bern–Kerzers–Neuchâtel/Murten (–Payerne)	Every 60 minutes	BLS
S51	Bern–Bern Brünnen Westside	Every 30 minutes	BLS
S52	Bern–Kerzers (–Neuchâtel)	Every 30 minutes	BLS
S6	Schwarzenburg–Bern	Every 30 minutes	BLS
S7	Bern–Bolligen–Worb	Every 15 minutes	RBS
S8	Bern–Jegenstorf	Every 15 minutes	RBS
S9	Bern–Unterzollikofen	Every 15 minutes	RBS

=== 2010–2012 ===
The December 2009 timetable change saw a limited number of changes. The most significant involved the S4 and S44. Service on the Ramsei–Huttwil line was cut back from Affoltern-Weier to Sumiswald-Grünen, and the S4 and S44 swapped termini, with the S4 now going to Sumiswald-Grünen and the S44 going to Langnau i.E. The December 2011 addition of the S31 between Münchenbuchsee and Belp (via Bern) increased the service frequency between those two stations to every fifteen minutes.

== See also ==
- Trams in Bern
- Trolleybuses in Bern
