= Ostermundigen railway station =

Railway station in Ostermundigen, Switzerland

Ostermundigen
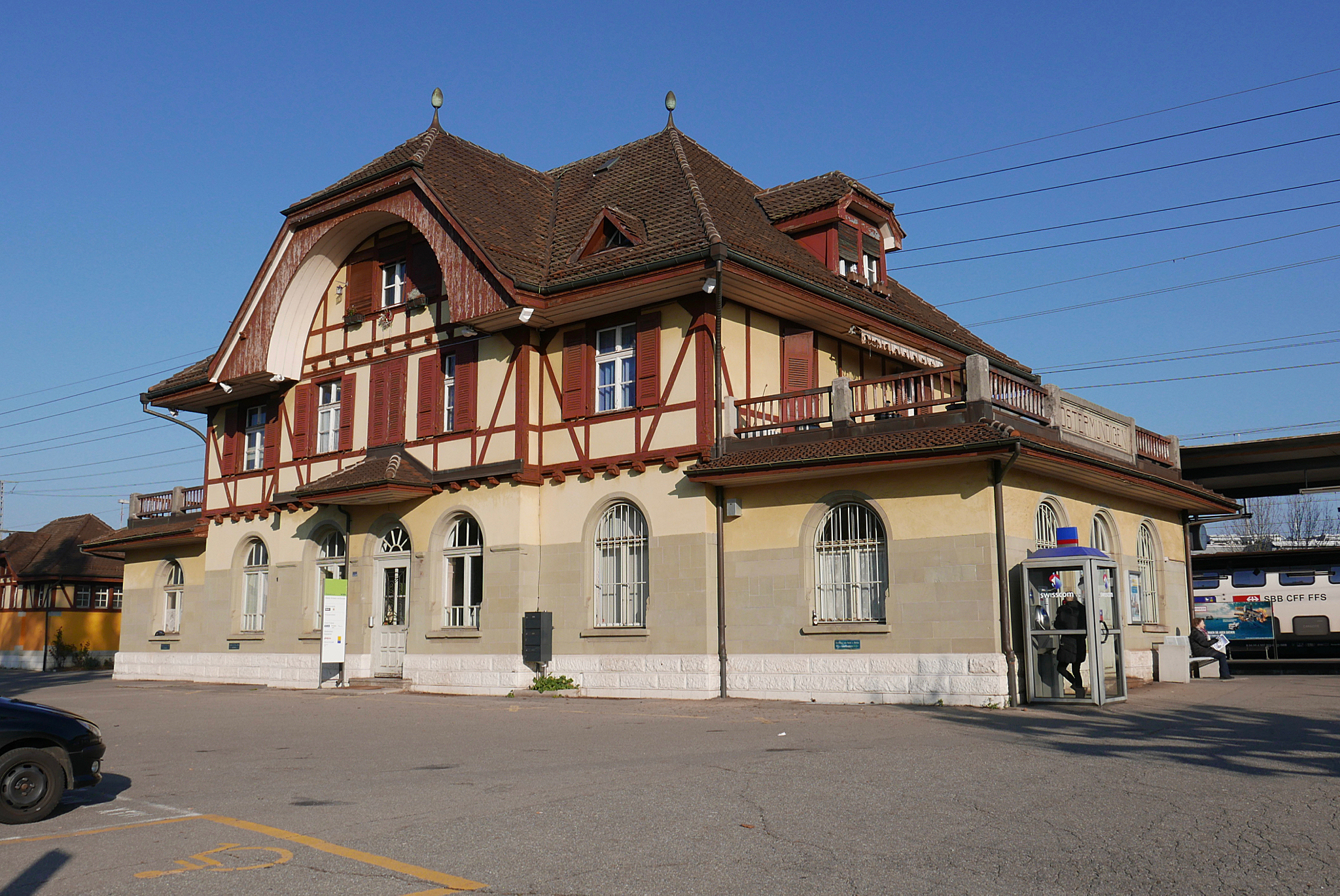
- The station building in 2016

General information
- Location: Ostermundigen; Switzerland
- Coordinates: 46°57′24″N 7°28′53″E
- Elevation: 558 m (1,831 ft)
- Owner: Swiss Federal Railways
- Lines: Bern–Lucerne line; Bern–Thun line
- Platforms: 1 side platform; 1 island platform
- Tracks: 3
- Train operators: BLS AG
- Connections: BERNMOBIL buses; RBS bus line

Construction
- Parking: No
- Cycle facilities: Yes (117 spaces)
- Accessible: No

Other information
- Station code: 8507002 (OST)
- Fare zone: 101 (Libero)

Passengers
- 2023: 4'300 per weekday (BLS, SBB)

Services
Preceding station	Bern S-Bahn	Following station
Bern Wankdorf towards Fribourg/Freiburg	S1	Gümligen towards Thun
Bern Wankdorf towards Bern	S11 Rush-hour service	Gümligen One-way operation
Bern Wankdorf towards Laupen BE	S2	Gümligen towards Langnau i.E.
Zollikofen One-way operation	S46 Rush-hour service	Terminus
Preceding station	BLS	Following station
Zollikofen towards Biel/Bienne	RE11 Weekends only	Gümligen towards Brig
Location

Ostermundigen railway station (German: Bahnhof Ostermundigen) is a railway station in the municipality of Ostermundigen, in the Swiss canton of Bern. It is an intermediate stop on the standard gauge Bern–Lucerne and Bern–Thun lines of Swiss Federal Railways.

== Services ==
As of the December 2024 timetable change, the following services stop at Ostermundigen:

- Bern S-Bahn:
  - S1: half-hourly service between Fribourg/Freiburg and Thun.
  - S11: two daily rush-hour services on weekdays to Bern.
  - S2: half-hourly service between Laupen BE and Langnau.
- RegioExpress: service on weekends during the high season between Biel/Bienne and Brig.
