= Olten–Bern railway line =

Swiss railway line

Olten–Bern
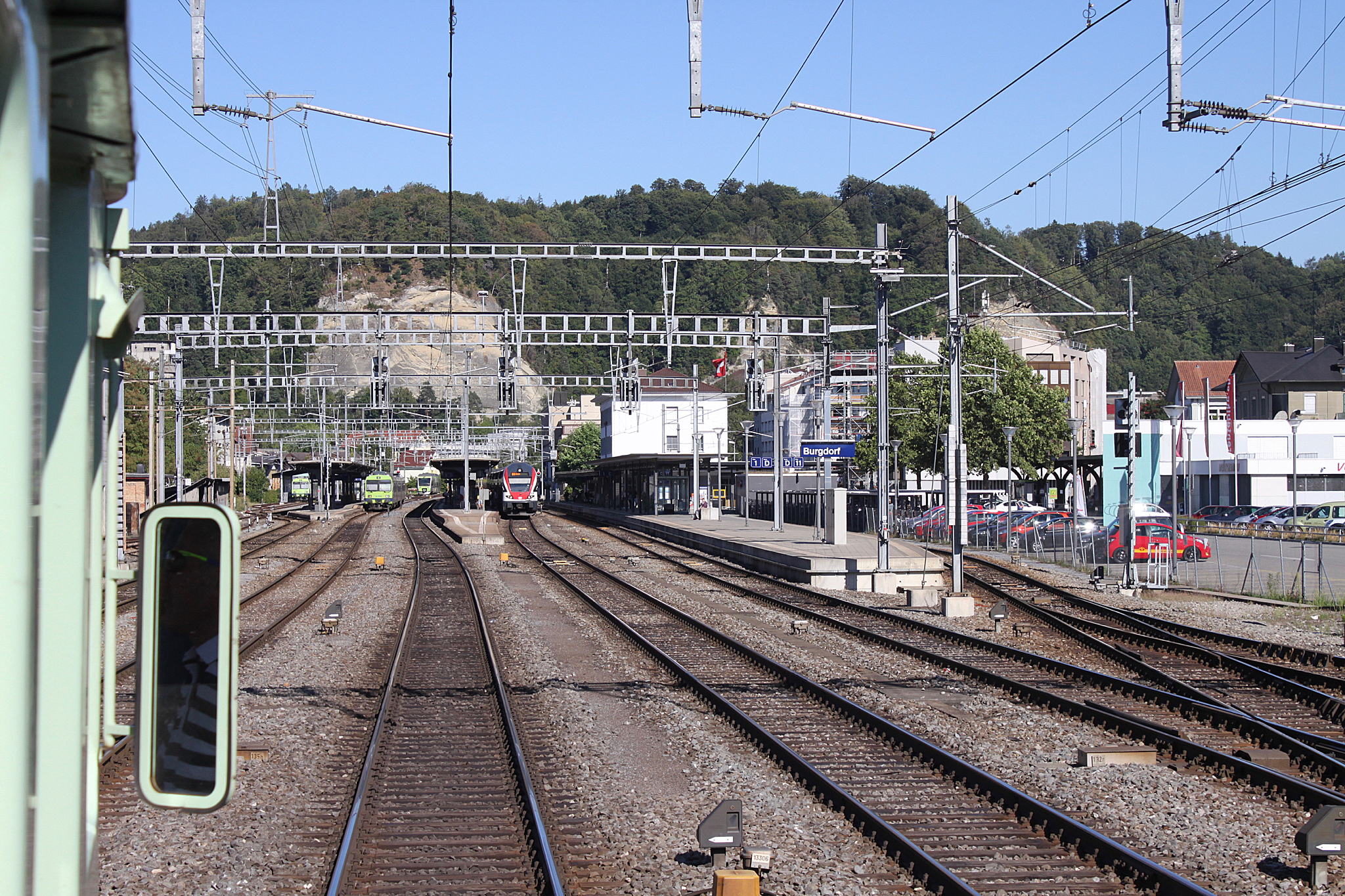
- Burgdorf station

Overview
- Line number: 450
- Locale: Bern and Solothurn
- Termini: Olten; Bern

Technical
- Number of tracks: 2
- Track gauge: 1,435 mm (4 ft 8 1/2 in)
- Minimum radius: 300 m (980 ft)
- Electrification: 15 kV/16.7 Hz AC overhead catenary

The Olten–Bern railway line is one of the major railway lines of Switzerland, running between the major rail hub of Olten—where lines from Zürich, Basel, Bern, Lucerne and Neuchâtel come together—and the Swiss capital of Bern. Together with the Lausanne–Bern railway, it forms the Mittellandlinie ("midland line"), which connects Olten with Lausanne. The first part of the line was opened in 1856 and the original line was completed on 4 September 1858. The line was built by the Swiss Central Railway, which was taken over by the Swiss Federal Railways on its establishment in 1902.

Several important upgrades have been implemented on this line since 1981. The Born line was opened in 1981 to bypass a congested section of line around Aarburg Oftringen station and the longer Grauholz line, including the 6-kilometre-long (3.7 mi) tunnel Grauholz Tunnel, was opened in 1995. This was extended on 12 December 2004, when the first major high-speed Mattstetten–Rothrist line was opened, although it is limited to 200 km/h.

== History ==
The oldest section of the line opened on 9 June 1856 from Olten to Aarburg-Oftringen as part of a line built by the Swiss Central Railway (German: Schweizerische Centralbahn) between Aarau, Olten, Aarburg and Emmenbrücke (near Lucerne). On 16 March 1857, the company opened the section from Aarburg-Oftringen to Herzogenbuchsee; three months later a branch line to Solothurn connecting with the Jura foot line was opened to traffic. Only 15 days later, on 16 June 1857, this was followed by the extension of the line from Herzogenbuchsee to Burgdorf and Zollikofen to the edge of the city of Bern at Wylerfeld. Since the railway bridge over the Aare river had not been built yet, a temporary station was established at Wylerfeld and for over a year, travellers were taken by coach from Wylerfeld to the city. Also a pedestrian link was opened at that time via the Altenbergsteg bridge below the site of the Kornhaus road bridge (which was completed in 1898). Finally, on 15 November 1858, the Aare Bridge (known as the Rote Brücke, German for "red bridge") because of its red lead rust-proof paint) was completed and the first train crossed the bridge and ran into Bern. Since the station building was still under construction, a temporary train shed was built. On 1 May 1860, the permanent Bern station was opened.

== Born line ==
The Born line, named after Born mountain, which it passes, was opened on 2 April 1981, to bypass the Aarburg Oftringen station, connecting Olten station directly with Rothrist station. It is now the access route to the Mattstetten–Rothrist new line.

The line from Olten to Aarburg-Oftringen was limited to 40 km/h and therefore was an obstacle to the operation of express trains between Bern and Zürich. This line also had to absorb all trains to Bern and Lucerne on two tracks and had therefore reached capacity. Therefore, the SBB began the construction of a new line between Olten and Rothrist, coinciding with the modernization of Olten station. Construction started in 1976 and scheduled operations on the line began on 31 May 1981.

The line is designed for a maximum speed of 140 km/h and although it is only 5.5 kilometres (3.4 mi) long it saved 3–4 minutes between Zürich and Bern. In addition, together with the modernization of Olten station, it significantly increased the capacity of the lines from Olten to Bern and Lucerne.

== Grauholz line and tunnel ==
The Grauholz Tunnel is a 6,295 metres (6,884 yd) long, double track tunnel opened in 1995 northeast of Bern, which relieved a bottleneck of the Bern-Zollikofen created by the addition of the traffic from the line from Biel to the mainline from Olten. It starts with a grade-separated branch at Löchligut and then enters the Grauholz Tunnel. At the other end, from 1995–2004 it rejoined the trunk line Bern-Olten line at Mattstetten. Since 2004 there is a grade-separated branch at Äspli, which runs straight on to the Mattstetten–Rothrist new line. For its entire length the tunnel runs on an "s"-shaped curve underneath the wooded Grauholz hill where the Bernese were defeated by French troops at the Battle of Grauholz on 5 March 1798.

== Mattstetten–Rothrist new line ==
On 12 December 2004, a new high-speed rail line was opened between Mattstetten and Rothrist as part of the comprehensive Rail 2000 project. It is almost 52 kilometres (32 mi) long, with one branch to Solothurn and the Jura foot railway line to Neuchâtel, Yverdon and Geneva. The line has a maximum speed of 200 kilometers per hour and reduced the travel time between major Swiss hubs of Bern, Basel and Zürich to under an hour allowing the regular interval timetable (German: Taktfahrplan) to be put into effect, where both express and stopping trains on all lines arrive and leave on the hour at Bern and Zürich stations, allowing a great number of convenient connections. The line was the longest new line built in Switzerland since 1926. Construction began in April 1996 and was planned to be completed date in 2005. On 30 April 2004, the last piece of rail was put into place at the Bern-Solothurn canton border at Inkwil on the connection to Solothurn.
