= BLS AG =

Swiss railway company

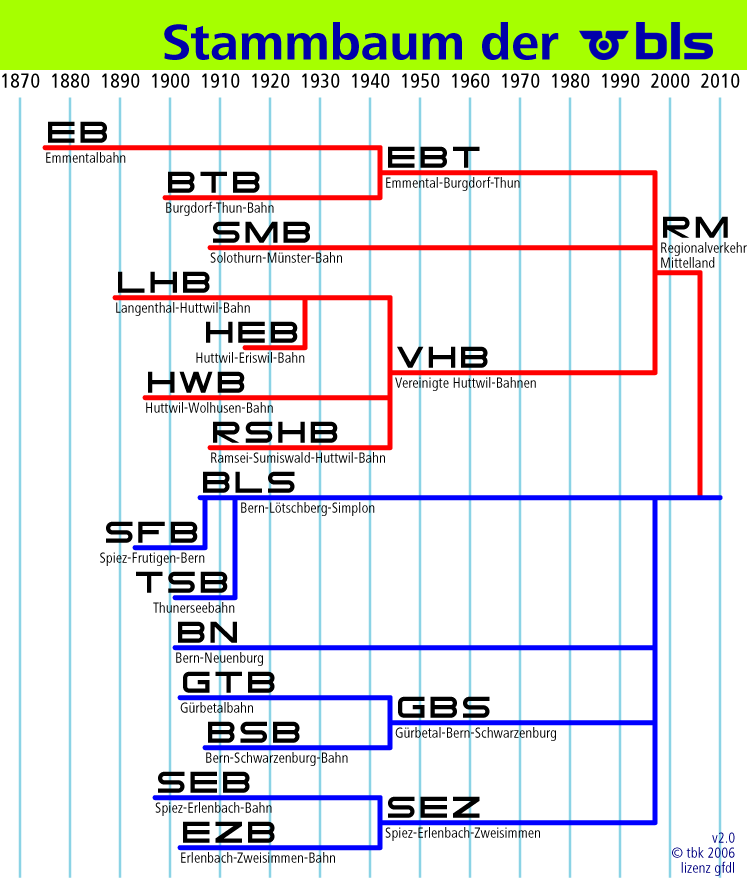
BLS AG family tree

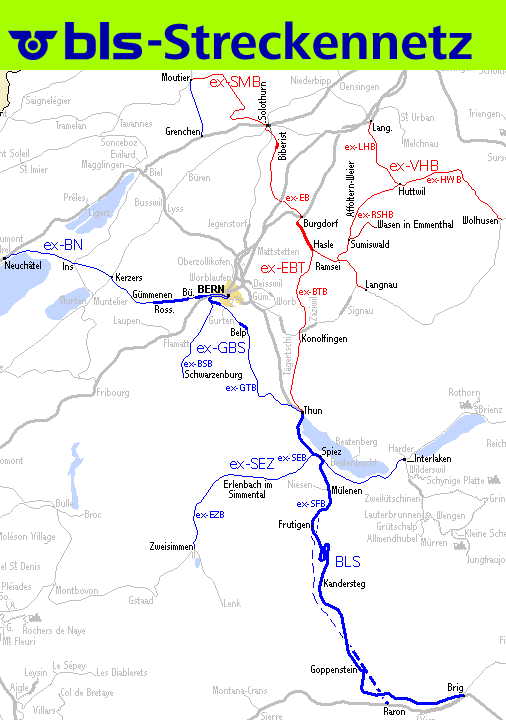
Rail network (infrastructure) after merger: blue lines belonged to BLS Lötschbergbahn, red lines to Regionalverkehr Mittelland

BLS AG is a Swiss railway company created by the 2006 merger of BLS Lötschbergbahn and Regionalverkehr Mittelland AG. Its ownership is divided, with 55.8% of it owned by the canton of Berne, and 21.7% by the Swiss Confederation. It has two main business fields: passenger traffic and infrastructure.

BLS has a subsidiary—BLS Cargo—which is responsible for all freight operations. BLS Cargo works in cooperation with the freight subsidiary of Deutsche Bahn, Railion. However, the staff, apart from management and sales, is employed by BLS AG. Part of the BLS locomotive fleet is owned by BLS Cargo.

Another subsidiary, BLS Fernverkehr AG, is responsible for long-distance passenger transport. BLS Fernverkehr AG is wholly owned by BLS AG.

BLS AG is one of the three major standard gauge railway operators im Switzerland, the other two being Swiss Federal Railways and Südostbahn.

== Infrastructure ==
In 2007 the new, 34.6-kilometre-long (21.5 mi) Lötschberg Base Tunnel opened, which is part of the 449 km of infrastructure owned and operated by BLS AG. The Lötschberg base tunnel was built by a wholly owned subsidiary, BLS AlpTransit AG. By mid-2007 this company handed over the base tunnel to BLS AG. In 2009 this company was renamed BLS Netz AG and the entire BLS infrastructure passed over to this company which is mainly owned by the Swiss Confederation, which has paid for most of the recent investments.

BLS AG owns the following railway lines:

- Bern–Neuchâtel railway line
- Moutier–Lengnau line
- Gürbetal railway line
- Lake Thun railway line
- Lötschberg railway line
- Spiez–Erlenbach–Zweisimmen railway line
- Solothurn–Moutier railway line
- Huttwil–Wolhusen railway line
- Langenthal–Huttwil railway

== Rolling stock ==
Also see Bern–Lötschberg–Simplon railway#Locomotives and multiple units

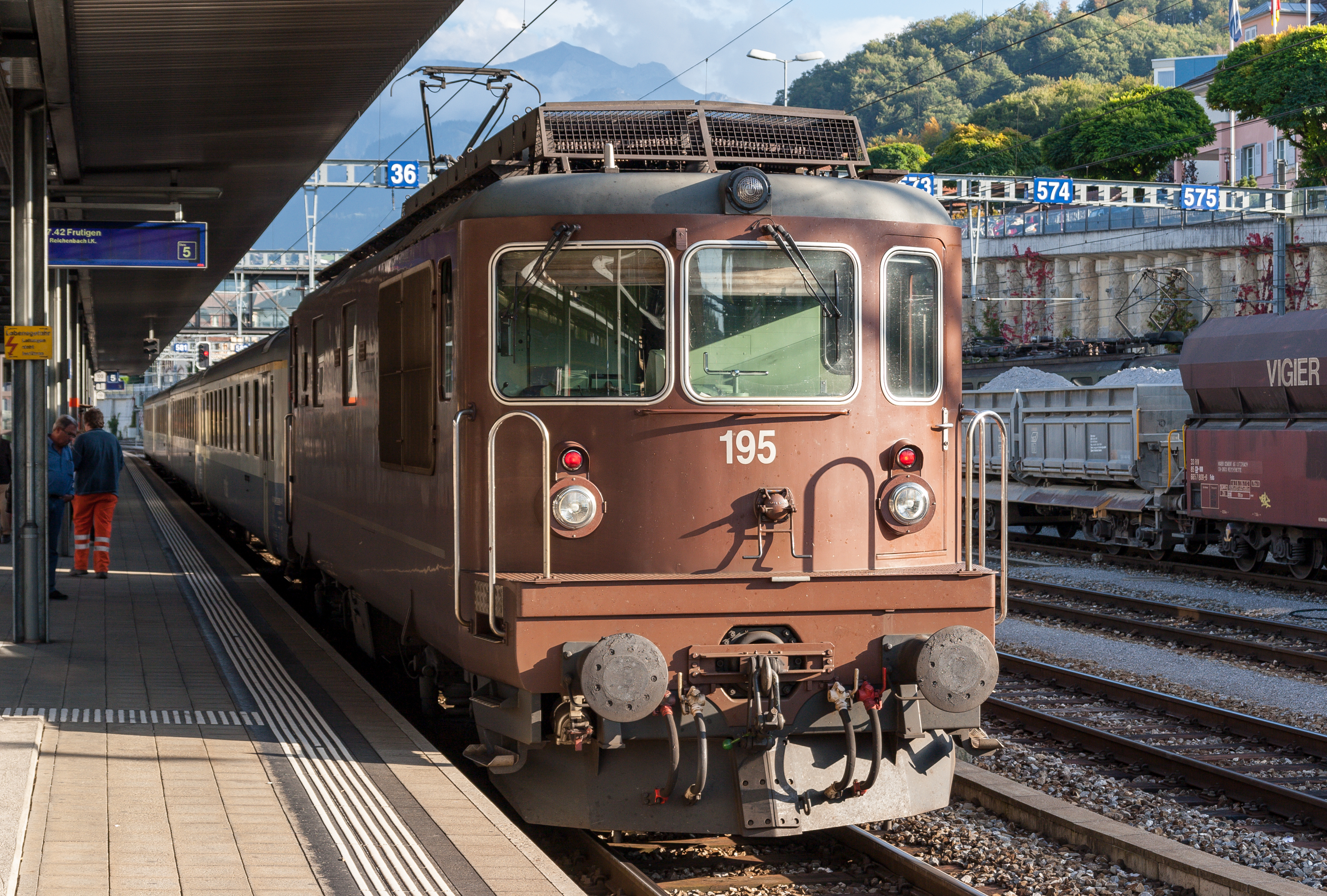
BLS Re 425 in Spiez (2010)

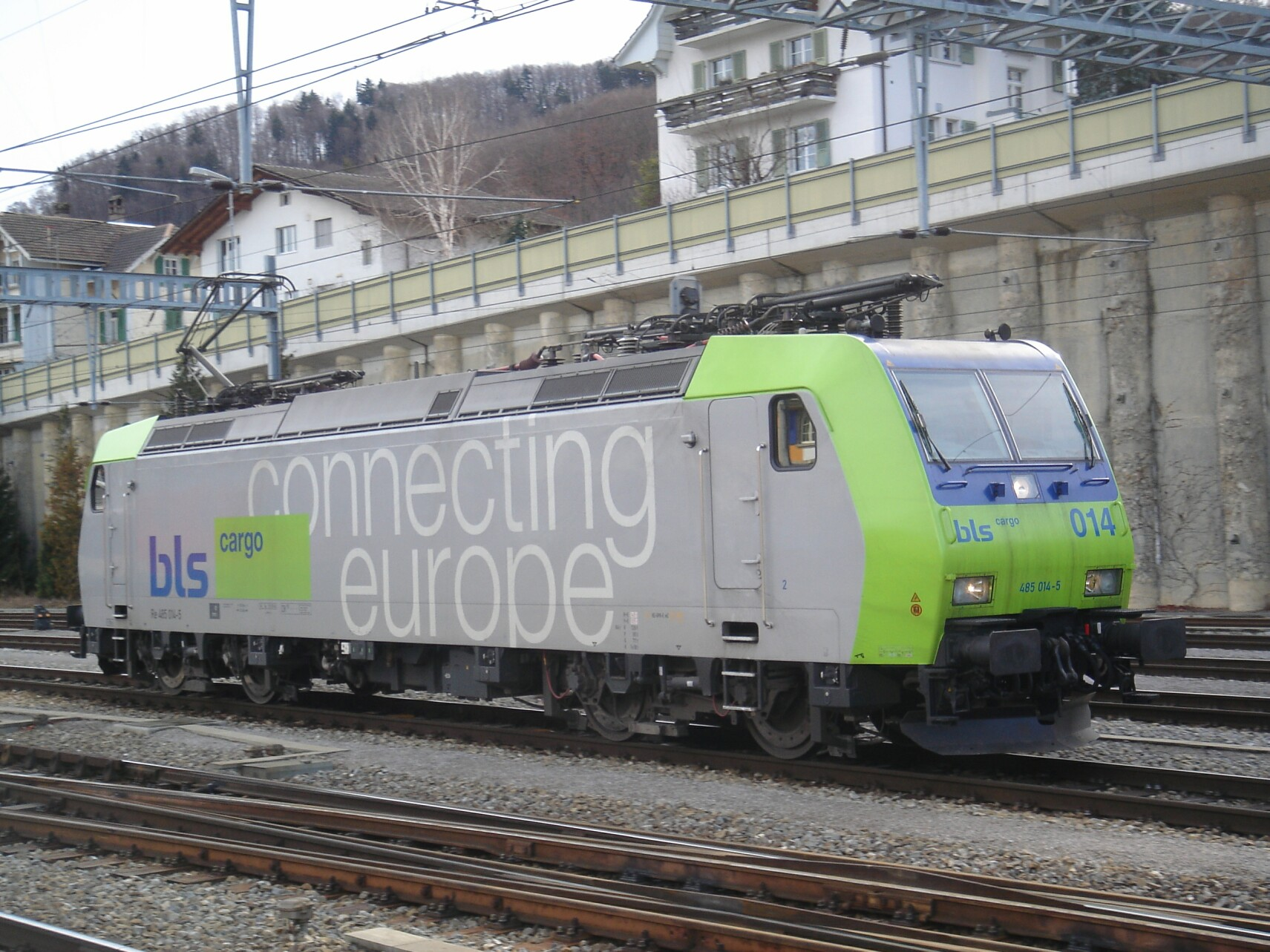
BLS Re 485 014-5 in Spiez, 18 February 2006.

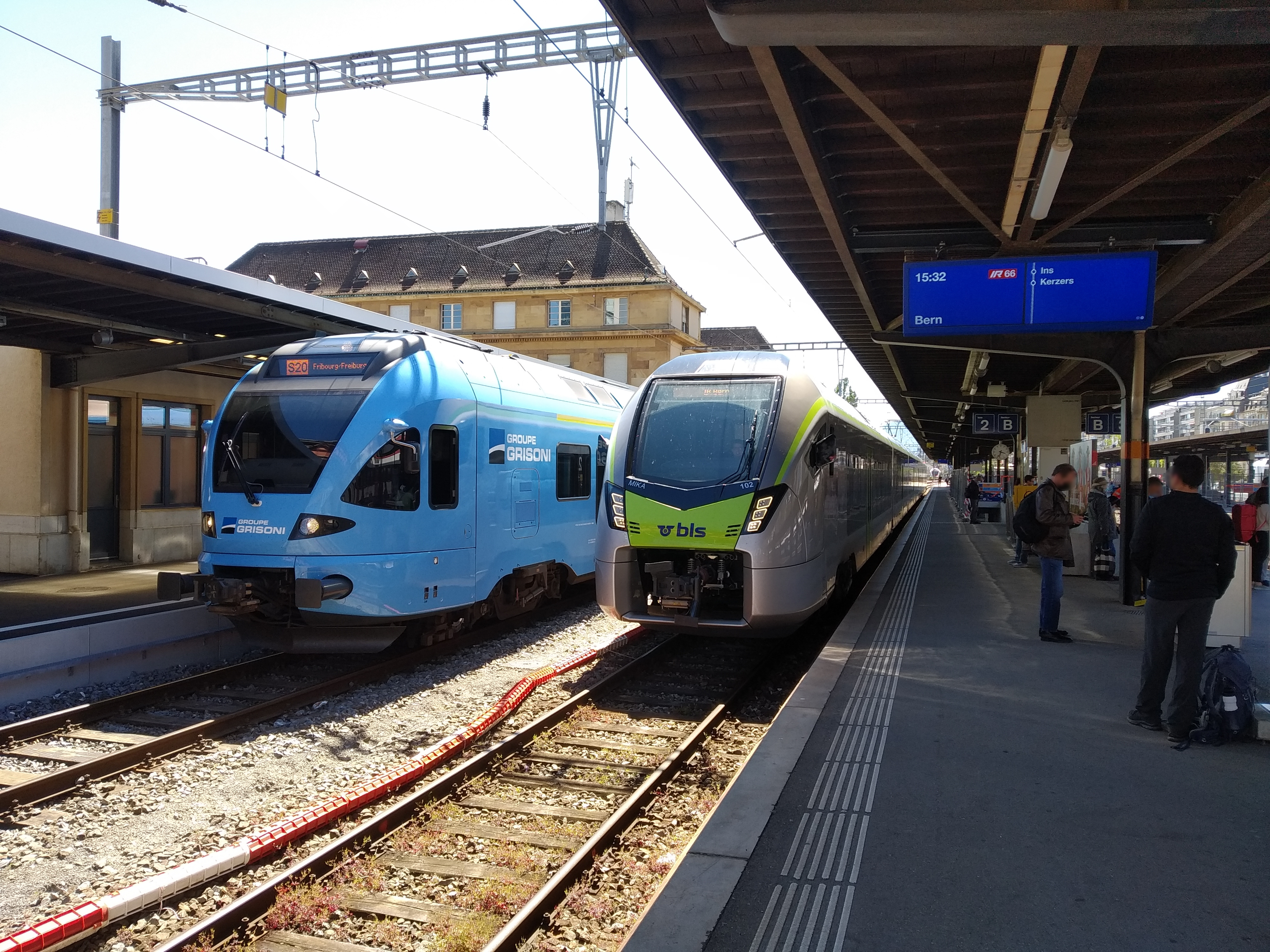
BLS RABe 528 (right) in Neuchâtel, 28 May 2021

- 3 x BLS Re 420
- 33 x BLS Re 425
- 18 x BLS Re 465
- 28 x BLS RABe 515
- 36 x BLS RABe 525
- 13 x BLS RABe 526
- 30 x BLS RABe 528 (+ 28 under delivery)
- 25 x BLS RABe 535
- 21 x BLS RBDe 565
- 13 x BLS RBDe 566

BLS Cargo has the following rolling stock.

- 4 x BLS Re 425
- 2 x BLS Re 456
- 10 x BLS Re 465
- 15 x BLS Re 475
- 20 x BLS Re 485
- 10 x BLS Re 486
- 1 x BLS Am 845

In 2010, 28 Stadler KISS EMUs were ordered; the first was delivered in March 2012. As of 2012, BLS was planning to spend around 1·2bn SFr on new rolling stock by 2025, building a more standardised fleet with fewer different types of train. In 2017, 58 Stadler FLIRT EMUs were ordered, expected to enter service between 2021 and 2026.

== Passenger train services ==
Since the merger, BLS has been the exclusive operator of the standard gauge part of the S-Bahn Bern. This includes open access services over Swiss Federal Railways (SBB) and STB Sensetalbahn tracks. Since December 2007 BLS offers a new RegioExpress (RE) service over the old Lötschberg route while the SBB-operated InterCity (IC), and EuroCity (EC) trains use the new Lötschberg tunnel. As of the December 2024 timetable change, BLS operates the following services:

S-Bahn Bern

- S1 Fribourg/Freiburg – Düdingen – Flamatt – Bern Europaplatz – Bern – Bern Wankdorf – Gümligen – Münsingen – Thun
- S2 Laupen BE – Flamatt – Bern Europaplatz – Bern – Bern Wankdorf – Gümligen –Konolfingen – Langnau i.E.
- S21 Thun – Steffisburg – Konolfingen
- S3 Biel/Bienne – Lyss – Zollikofen – Bern Wankdorf – Bern – Bern Europaplatz – Belp
- S31 (Biel/Bienne – Lyss) – Münchenbuchsee – Zollikofen – Bern Wankdorf – Bern – Bern Europaplatz – Belp
- S35 Kerzers – Lyss
- S36 Lyss – Büren an der Aare
- S4 Thun – Belp – Bern – Bern Wankdorf – Zollikofen – Burgdorf – Langnau i.E.
- S41 Thun – Konolfingen – Hasle-Rüegsau – Burgdorf – Solothurn
- S42 Thun – Konolfingen – Hasle-Rüegsau
- S44 Thun – Belp – Bern – Bern Wankdorf – Burgdorf – Solothurn / Sumiswald-Grünen
- S45 Ramsei – Sumiswald-Grünen
- S5 Bern – Kerzers – Neuchâtel / Avenches
- S51 Bern – Bern Stöckacker – Bern Brünnen Westside
- S52 Bern – Bern Brünnen Westside – Kerzers – Murten/Morat (– Payerne) / (–Ins)
- S6 Bern – Bern Europaplatz – Köniz – Schwarzenburg

S-Bahn Luzern

- S6 Langnau i.E. – Wolhusen – Malters – Luzern
- S7 Langenthal – Huttwil – Willisau – Wolhusen – Luzern (coupled with RE7 between Wolhusen and Luzern)
- S77 Luzern – Malters – Wolhusen – Willisau

RegioExpress (RE)

- RE1 Bern – Spiez – Kandersteg – Brig (– Domodossola)
- RE2 Domodossola – Brig – Visp
- RE7 Bern – Langnau i.E. – Luzern
- RE8 Spiez – Zweisimmen
- RE9 Spiez – Interlaken Ost
- RE11 Biel/Bienne – Lyss – Spiez – Kandersteg – Brig

Regional trains (R)

- R11 Spiez – Zweisimmen
- R12 Spiez – Frutigen

InterRegio (IR)

- Bern – Olten
- Basel SBB – Delémont – Biel/Bienne
- Bern – Biel/Bienne
- Bern – Neuchâtel – La Chaux-de-Fonds

Car Shuttle Train (AV)

- AV 1 Brig – Iselle di Trasquera
- AV 2 Kandersteg – Iselle di Trasquera
- AV 3 Kandersteg – Goppenstein

== BLS Busland ==
BLS Busland operates a fleet of 36 buses over a network that complements the passenger train services. The bus fleet consists of

- Mercedes-Benz Citaro
- Volvo B7L

== BLS Navigation ==
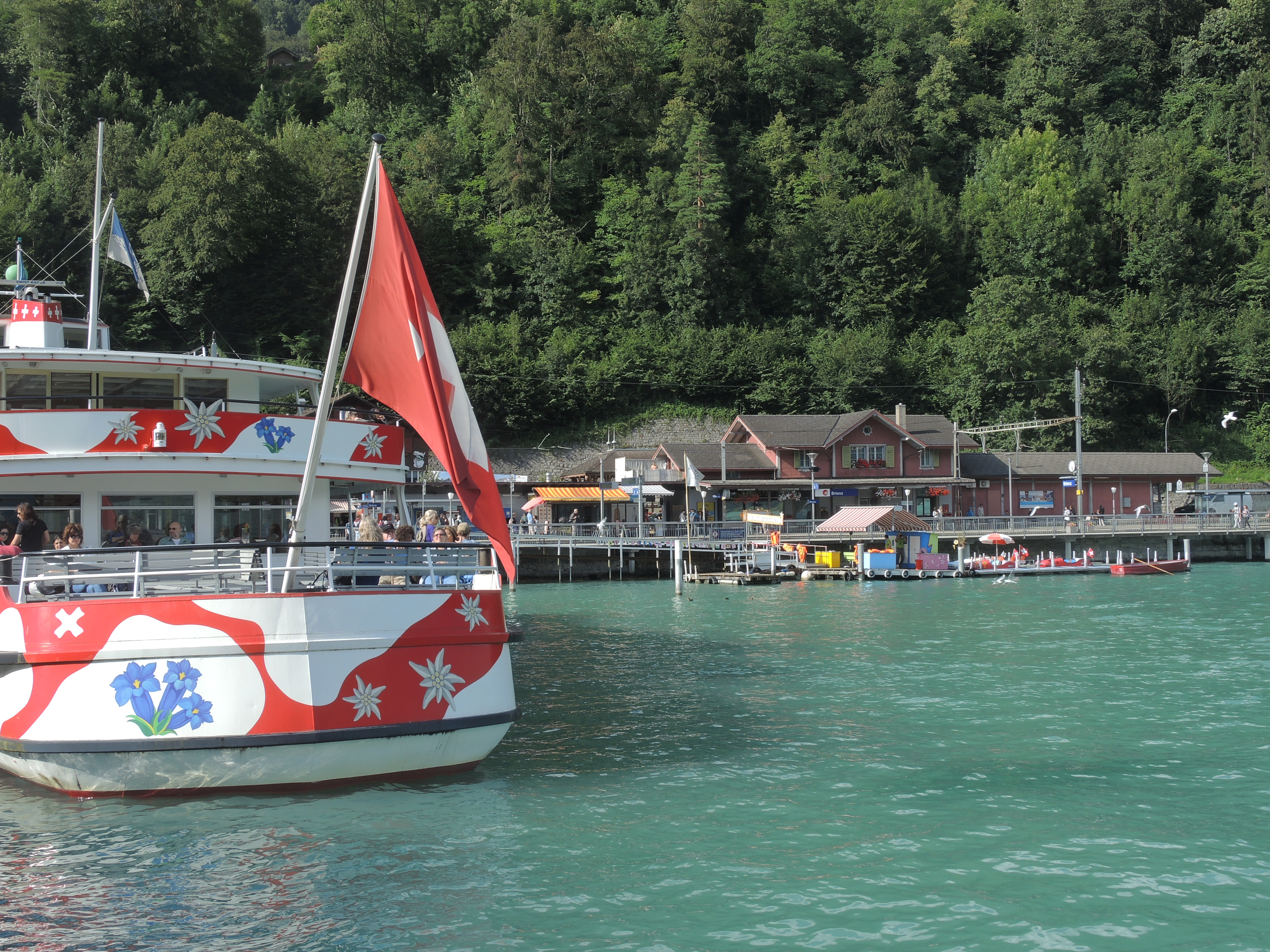
MS Jungfrau on Brienzersee at Brienz

BLS owns and operates steamers on Lake Brienz and Lake Thun under the BLS Navigation brand. These steamers utilise the Interlaken and Thun ship canals.

- Blümlisalp, paddle steamer built in 1906

== See also ==
- Rail transport in Switzerland
