= Neuenegg railway station =

Railway station in Neuenegg, Switzerland

Neuenegg
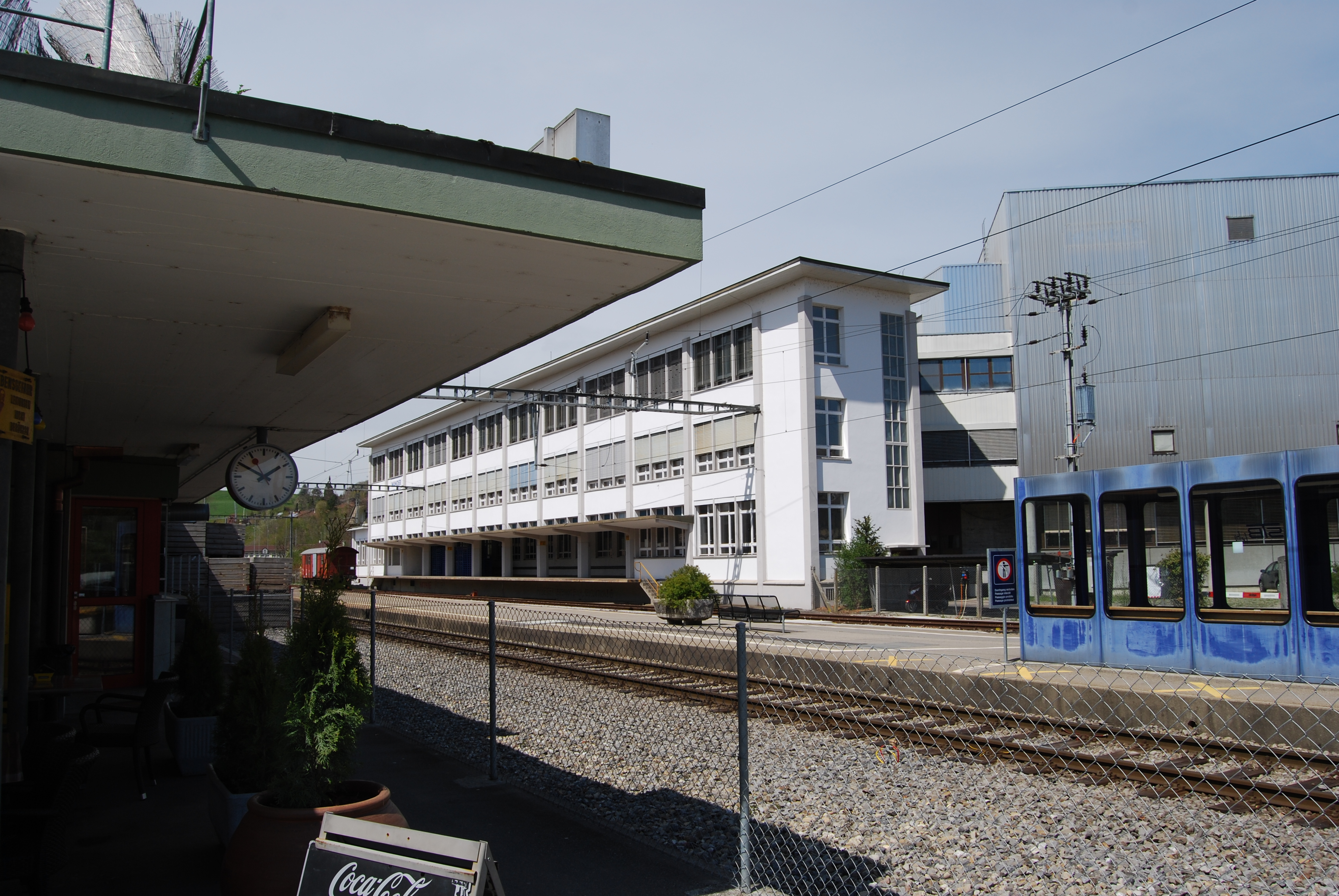
- The station platform in 2012, prior to the renovation

General information
- Location: Neuenegg, Bern; Switzerland
- Coordinates: 46°53′38″N 7°18′00″E
- Elevation: 524 m (1,719 ft)
- Owner: Sensetalbahn
- Line: Flamatt–Laupen line
- Distance: 1.7 km (1.1 mi) from Flamatt
- Platforms: 2 side platforms
- Tracks: 2
- Train operators: BLS AG
- Connections: PostAuto AG buses

Construction
- Cycle facilities: Yes (61 spaces)
- Accessible: Yes

Other information
- Station code: 8504192 (NGG)
- Fare zone: 699 (Libero)

Passengers
- 2023: 840 per weekday (BLS)

Services
Preceding station	Bern S-Bahn	Following station
Laupen BE Terminus	S2	Flamatt Dorf towards Langnau i.E.
Location

Neuenegg railway station (German: Bahnhof Neuenegg) is a railway station in the municipality of Neuenegg, in the Swiss canton of Bern. It is located on the standard gauge Flamatt–Laupen line of the Sensetalbahn.

== History ==
Between 2019 and 2021 the station was rebuilt with two new 230-metre (750 ft)-long side platforms, connected by an underpass. The new platforms are 55 centimetres (22 in) high, permitting barrier-free boarding. The station re-opened, with the rest of the line, in April 2021.

== Services ==
As of the December 2024 timetable change, the following services stop at Neuenegg:

- Bern S-Bahn: S2: half-hourly service between Laupen BE and Langnau.
