= Flamatt Dorf railway station =

Railway station in Wünnewil-Flamatt, Switzerland

Flamatt Dorf
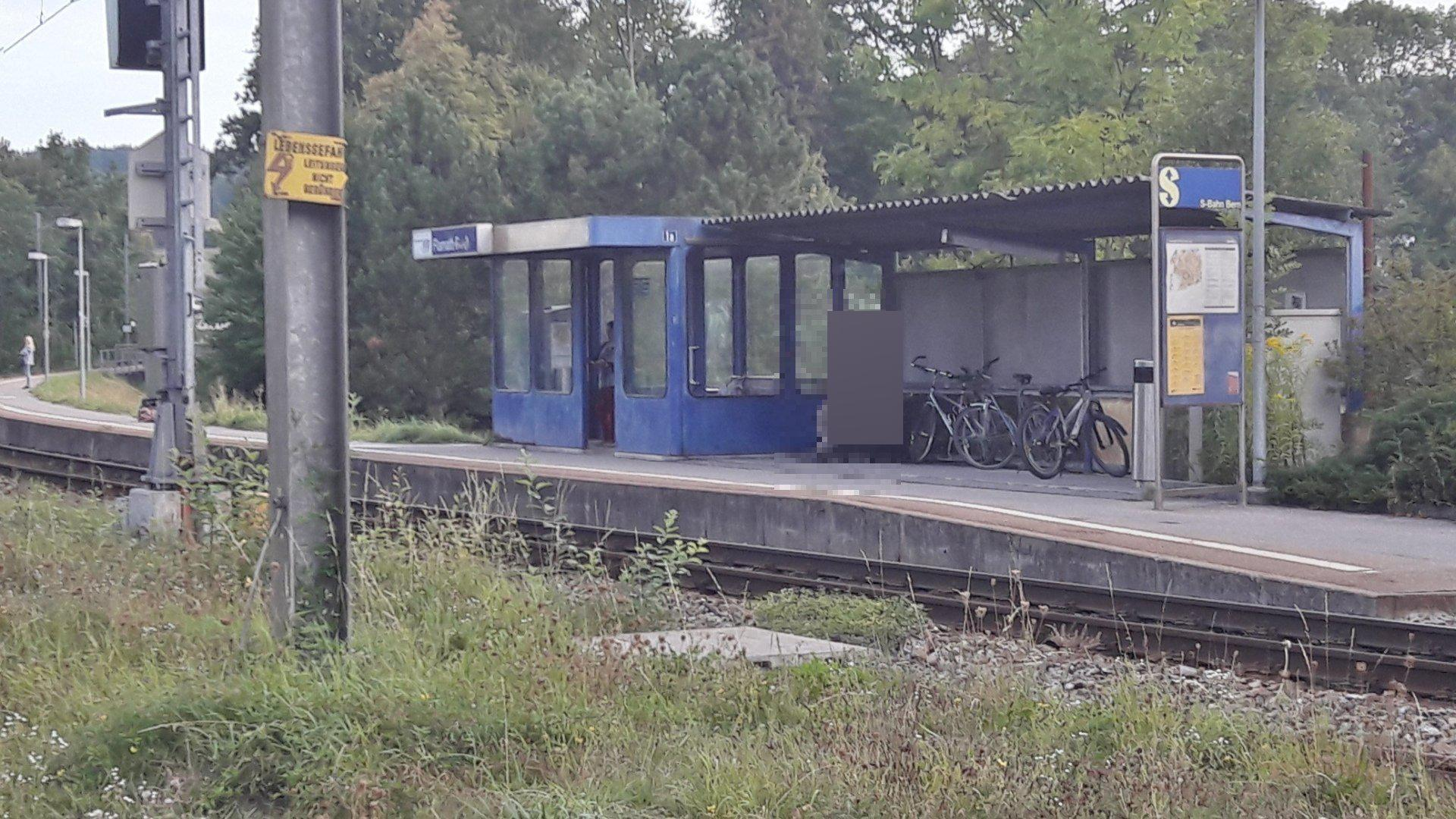
- The station platform in 2018, prior to the renovation

General information
- Location: Wünnewil-Flamatt, Fribourg; Switzerland
- Coordinates: 46°53′24″N 7°18′38″E
- Elevation: 532 m (1,745 ft)
- Owner: Sensetalbahn
- Line: Flamatt–Laupen line
- Distance: 0.7 km (0.43 mi) from Flamatt
- Platforms: 1 side platform
- Tracks: 1
- Train operators: BLS AG

Construction
- Parking: None available
- Cycle facilities: Yes (15 spaces)
- Accessible: Yes

Other information
- Station code: 8504191 (FLMD)
- Fare zone: 14 (frimobil); 699 (Libero)

Passengers
- 2023: 250 per weekday (BLS)

Services
Preceding station	Bern S-Bahn	Following station
Neuenegg towards Laupen BE	S2	Flamatt towards Langnau i.E.
Location

Flamatt Dorf railway station (German: Bahnhof Flamatt Dorf) is a railway station in the municipality of Wünnewil-Flamatt, in the Swiss canton of Fribourg. It is located on the standard gauge Flamatt–Laupen line of the Sensetalbahn.

== History ==
Between 2019 and 2021 the station's side platform was lengthened by 70 metres (230 ft), to accommodate longer trains, and raised to permit barrier-free boarding. The station re-opened, with the rest of the line, in April 2021.

== Services ==
As of the December 2024 timetable change, the following services stop at Flamatt Dorf:

- Bern S-Bahn: S2: half-hourly service between Laupen BE and Langnau.
