= Zäziwil railway station =

Railway station in Zäziwil, Switzerland

Zäziwil
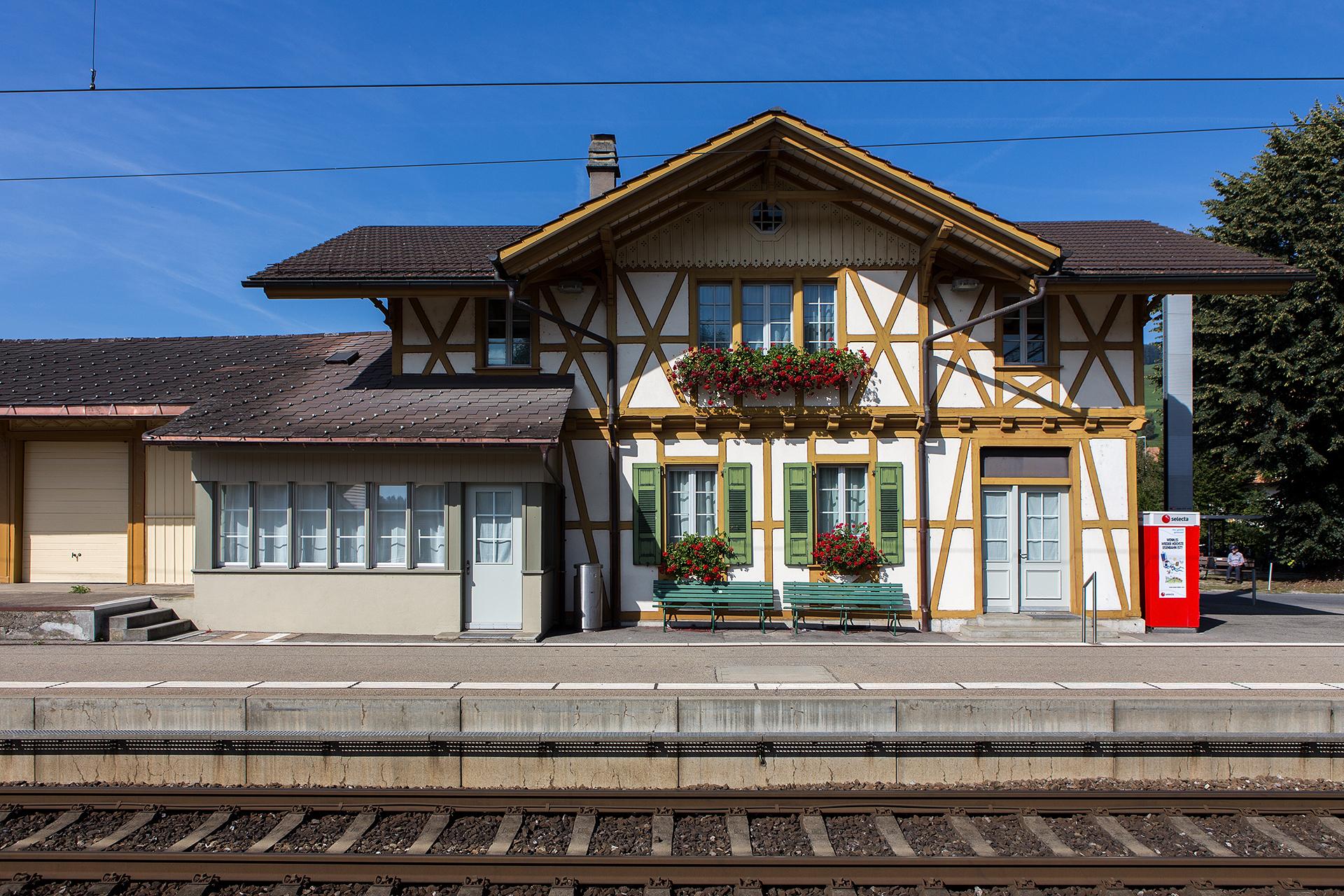
- The station building in 2016

General information
- Location: Zäziwil; Switzerland
- Coordinates: 46°53′59″N 7°39′46″E
- Elevation: 680 m (2,230 ft)
- Owner: Swiss Federal Railways
- Line: Bern–Lucerne line
- Platforms: 2 side platforms
- Tracks: 2
- Train operators: BLS AG

Construction
- Parking: Yes (26 spaces)
- Cycle facilities: Yes (40 spaces)
- Accessible: Yes

Other information
- Station code: 8508203 (ZAE)
- Fare zone: 130 (Libero)

Passengers
- 2023: 660 per weekday (BLS)

Services
| Preceding station | Bern S-Bahn | Following station |
|---|---|---|
| Konolfingen towards Laupen BE | S2 | Bowil towards Langnau i.E. |
| Konolfingen towards Bern | S22 Rush-hour service | Signau One-way operation |
| Konolfingen One-way operation | S22 Rush-hour service | Signau towards Langnau i.E. |
Location

Zäziwil railway station (German: Bahnhof Zäziwil) is a railway station in the municipality of Zäziwil, in the Swiss canton of Bern. It is an intermediate stop on the standard gauge Bern–Lucerne line of Swiss Federal Railways.

== Services ==
As of the December 2024 timetable change, the following services stop at Zäziwil:

- Bern S-Bahn:
  - S2: half-hourly service between Laupen BE and Langnau.
  - S22: rush-hour service on weekdays between Bern and Langnau.
