= Thörishaus railway station =

Thörishaus railway station could refer to two stations in Köniz, Switzerland:

- Thörishaus Dorf railway station
- Thörishaus Station railway station
