= Bowil railway station =

Railway station in Bowil, Switzerland

Bowil
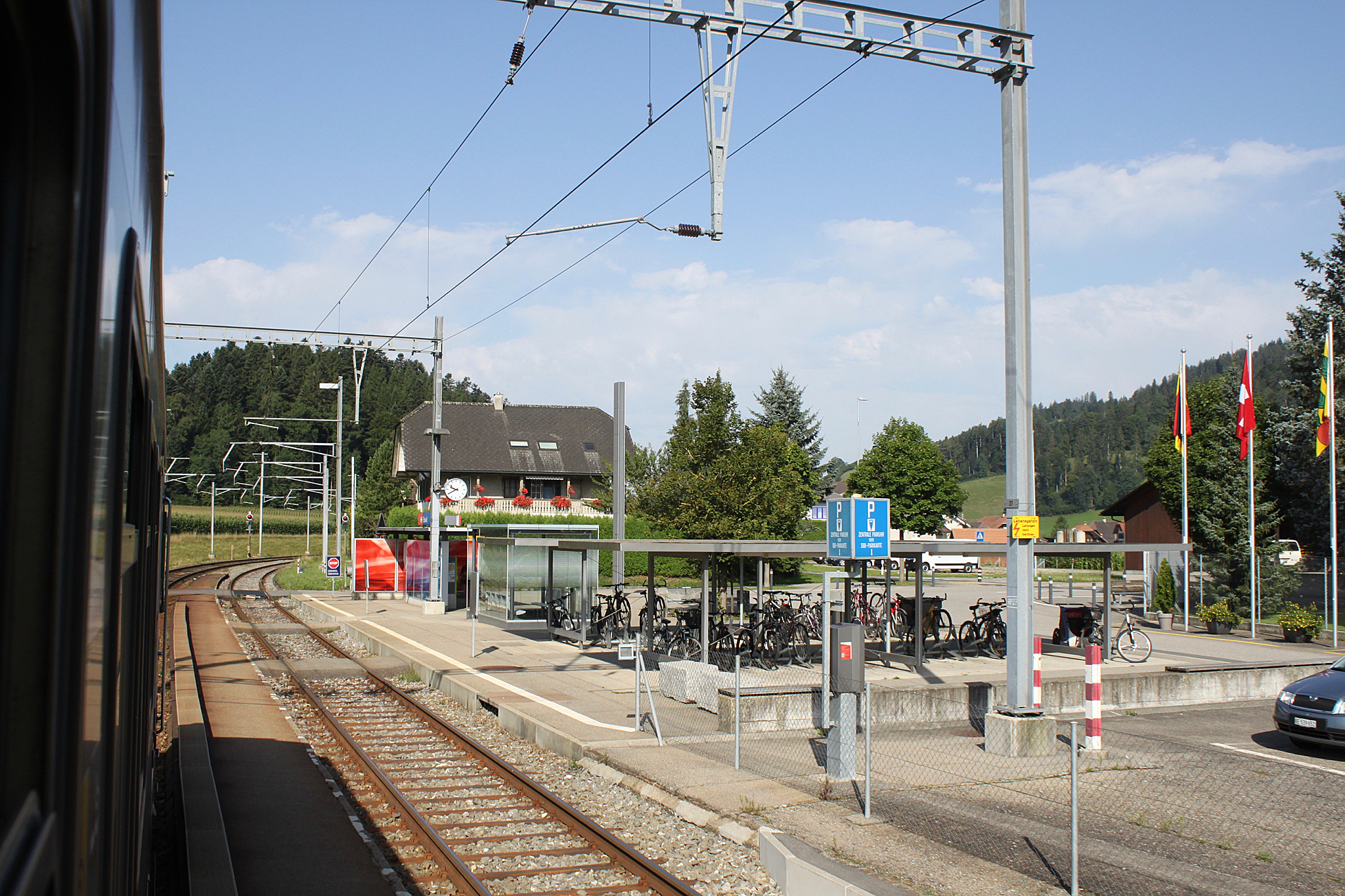
- The station platforms in 2017

General information
- Location: Bowil; Switzerland
- Coordinates: 46°54′00″N 7°41′53″E
- Elevation: 706 m (2,316 ft)
- Owner: Swiss Federal Railways
- Line: Bern–Lucerne line
- Platforms: 1 side platform
- Tracks: 2
- Train operators: BLS AG

Construction
- Parking: Yes (24 spaces)
- Cycle facilities: Yes (64 spaces)
- Accessible: Yes

Other information
- Station code: 8508204 (BOW)
- Fare zone: 147 (Libero)

Passengers
- 2023: 300 per weekday (BLS)

Services
Preceding station	Bern S-Bahn	Following station
Zäziwil towards Laupen BE	S2	Signau towards Langnau i.E.
Zäziwil One-way operation	S22 Rush-hour service	Signau towards Langnau i.E.
Location

Bowil railway station (German: Bahnhof Bowil) is a railway station in the municipality of Bowil, in the Swiss canton of Bern. It is an intermediate stop on the standard gauge Bern–Lucerne line of Swiss Federal Railways.

== Services ==
As of the December 2024 timetable change, the following services stop at Bowil:

- Bern S-Bahn S2: half-hourly service between Laupen BE and Langnau.
