= Thörishaus Station railway station =

Railway station in Köniz, Switzerland

Thörishaus Station
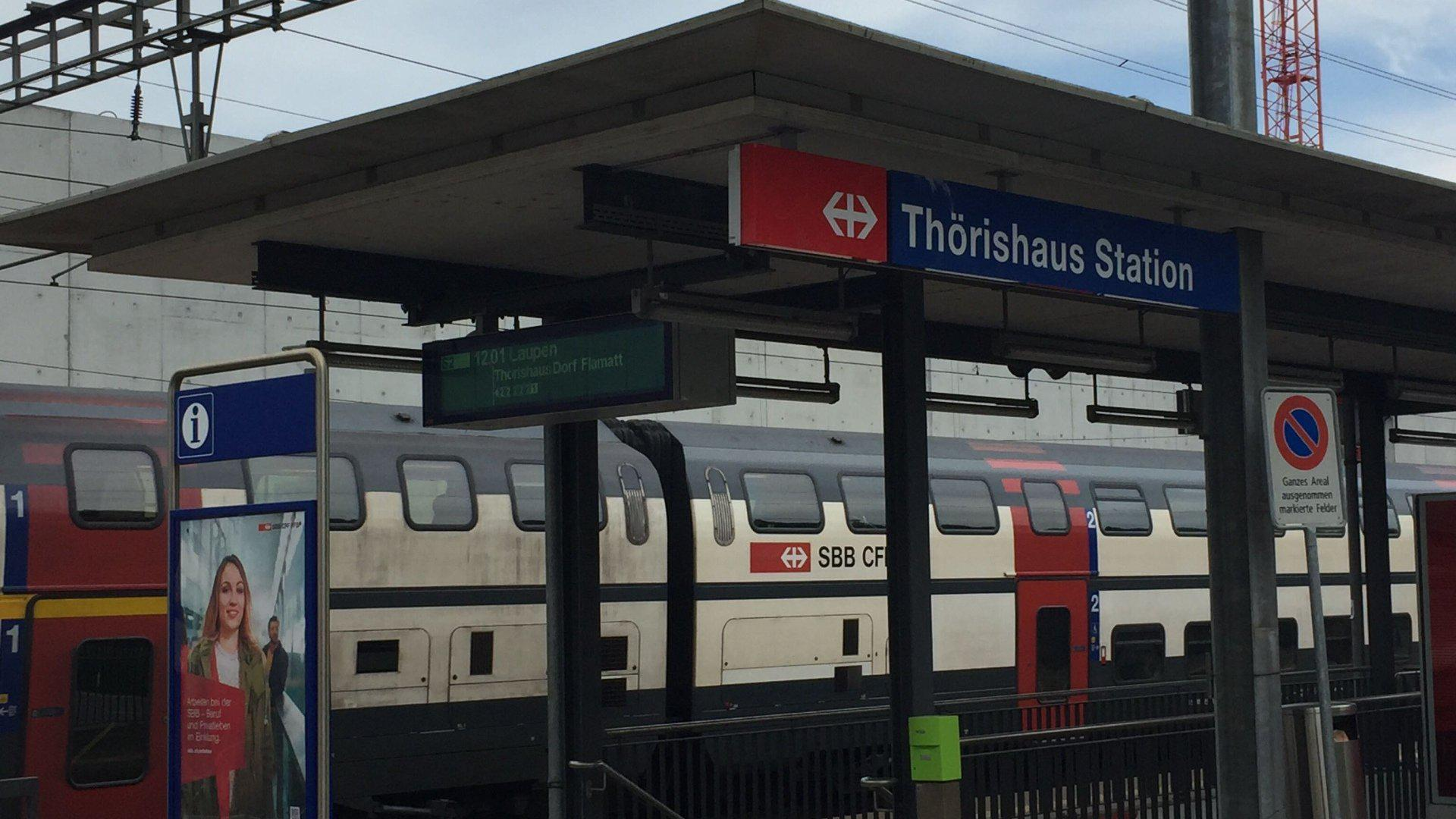
- The station platforms in 2018

General information
- Location: Köniz; Switzerland
- Coordinates: 46°54′17″N 7°21′25″E
- Elevation: 585 m (1,919 ft)
- Owner: Swiss Federal Railways
- Line: Lausanne–Bern line
- Distance: 88.2 km (54.8 mi) from Lausanne
- Platforms: 2: 1 side platform; 1 island platform
- Tracks: 3
- Train operators: BLS AG

Construction
- Parking: Yes (15 spaces)
- Cycle facilities: Yes (10 spaces)
- Accessible: Yes

Other information
- Station code: 8504104 (THO)
- Fare zone: 112 (Libero)

Passengers
- 2023: 330 per weekday (BLS)

Services
Preceding station	Bern S-Bahn	Following station
Thörishaus Dorf towards Laupen BE	S2	Oberwangen towards Langnau i.E.
Location

Thörishaus Station railway station (German: Bahnhof Thörishaus Station) (Note: The station's name is redundant in English but not in either French or German, the two languages of the canton of Bern. Official and unofficial sources always include "Station" as part of the name regardless of language.) is a railway station in the municipality of Köniz, in the Swiss canton of Bern. It is an intermediate stop on the standard gauge Lausanne–Bern line of Swiss Federal Railways.

== Services ==
As of the December 2024 timetable change, the following services stop at Thörishaus Station:

- Bern S-Bahn S2: half-hourly service between Laupen BE and Langnau.
