= Thörishaus Dorf railway station =

Railway station in Köniz, Switzerland

Thörishaus Dorf
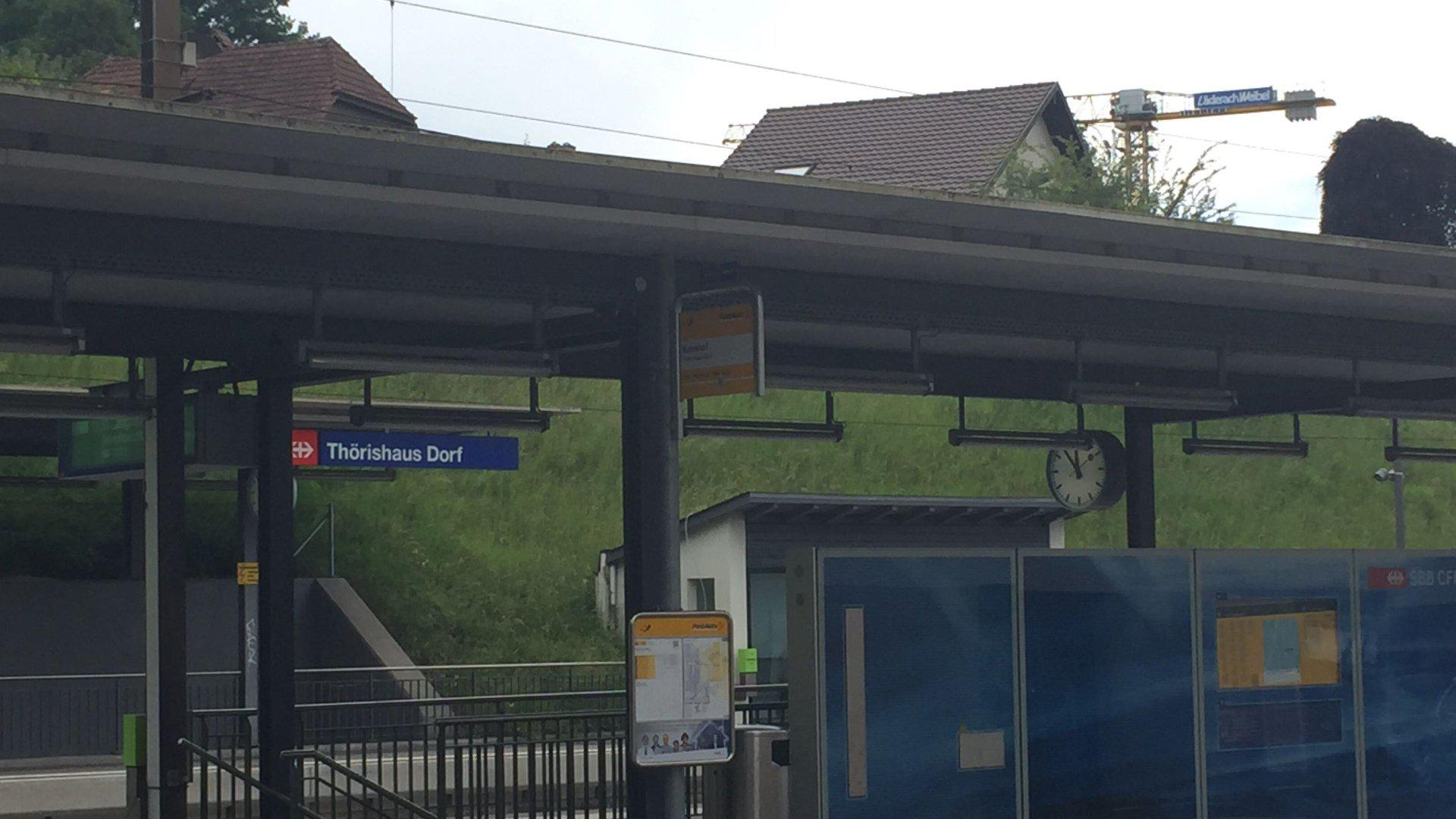
- The station platforms in 2018

General information
- Location: Köniz; Switzerland
- Coordinates: 46°53′37″N 7°21′07″E
- Elevation: 575 m (1,886 ft)
- Owner: Swiss Federal Railways
- Line: Lausanne–Bern line
- Distance: 86.9 km (54.0 mi) from Lausanne
- Platforms: 2 side platforms
- Tracks: 2
- Train operators: BLS AG
- Connections: PostAuto AG buses

Construction
- Parking: Yes (8 spaces)
- Cycle facilities: Yes (47 spaces)
- Accessible: Partly

Other information
- Station code: 8504115 (THOD)
- Fare zone: 112 (Libero)

Passengers
- 2023: 1'800 per weekday (BLS)

Services
Preceding station	Bern S-Bahn	Following station
Flamatt towards Fribourg/Freiburg	S1	Niederwangen towards Thun
Flamatt towards Laupen BE	S2	Thörishaus Station towards Langnau i.E.
Location

Thörishaus Dorf railway station (German: Bahnhof Thörishaus Dorf) is a railway station in the municipality of Köniz, in the Swiss canton of Bern. It is an intermediate stop on the standard gauge Lausanne–Bern line of Swiss Federal Railways.

== Services ==
As of the December 2024 timetable change, the following services stop at Thörishaus Dorf:

- Bern S-Bahn:
  - S1: half-hourly service between Fribourg/Freiburg and Thun.
  - S2: half-hourly service between Laupen BE and Langnau.
