= Zollbrück railway station =

Railway station in Rüderswil, Switzerland

Zollbrück
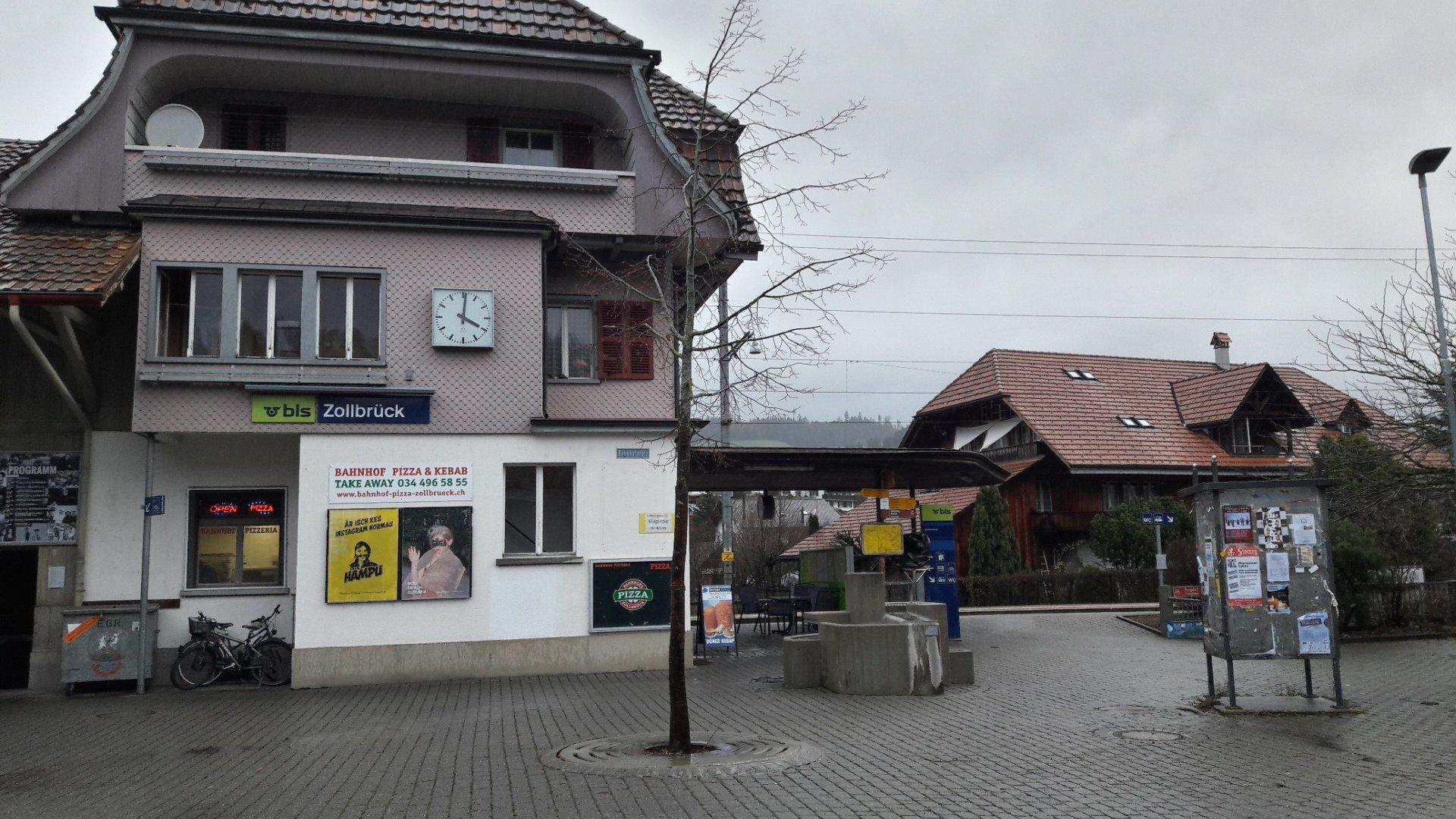
- The station building in 2018

General information
- Location: Rüderswil; Switzerland
- Coordinates: 46°58′34″N 7°44′28″E
- Elevation: 625 m (2,051 ft)
- Owner: BLS AG
- Line: Solothurn–Langnau line
- Distance: 36.4 km (22.6 mi) from Solothurn
- Platforms: 1 side platform
- Tracks: 1
- Train operators: BLS AG
- Connections: Busland AG bus line; Bürgerbus Rüderswil bus line

Construction
- Parking: Yes (5 spaces)
- Accessible: Yes

Other information
- Station code: 8508268 (ZO)
- Fare zone: 141 (Libero)

Passengers
- 2023: 230 per weekday (BLS)

Services
Preceding station	Bern S-Bahn	Following station
Ramsei towards Thun	S4	Neumühle towards Langnau i.E.
Location

Zollbrück railway station (German: Bahnhof Zollbrück) is a railway station in the municipality of Rüderswil, in the Swiss canton of Bern. It is an intermediate stop on the standard gauge Solothurn–Langnau line of BLS AG.

== Services ==
As of the December 2024 timetable change, the following services stop at Zollbrück:

- Bern S-Bahn S4: hourly service between Thun and Langnau.
