= Signau railway station =

Railway station in Signau, Switzerland

Signau
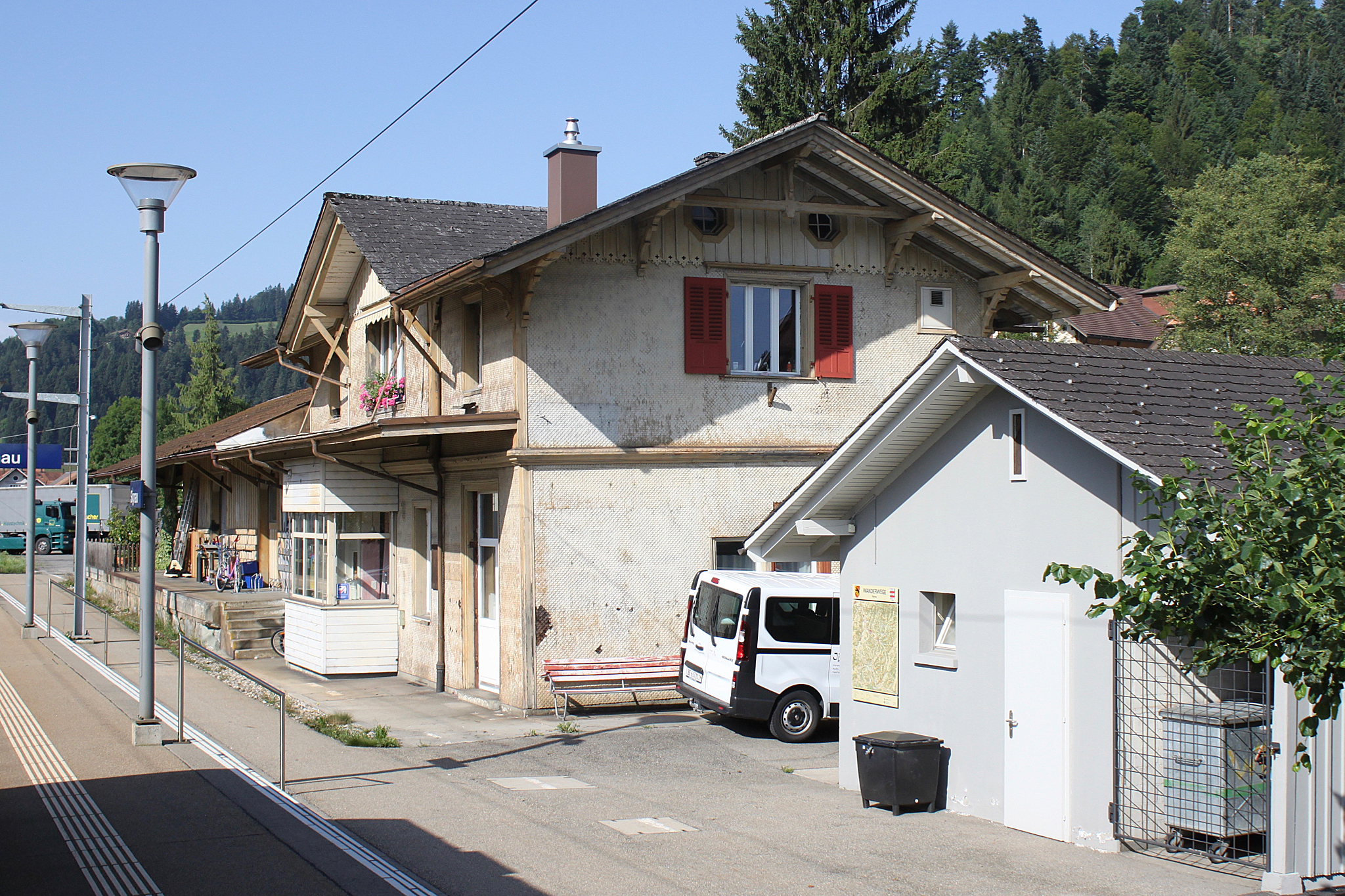
- The station building in 2017

General information
- Location: Signau; Switzerland
- Coordinates: 46°55′11″N 7°43′32″E
- Elevation: 684 m (2,244 ft)
- Owner: Swiss Federal Railways
- Line: Bern–Lucerne line
- Platforms: 2 side platforms
- Tracks: 2
- Train operators: BLS AG
- Connections: Busland AG bus line

Construction
- Parking: Yes (6 spaces)
- Cycle facilities: Yes (72 spaces)
- Accessible: Yes

Other information
- Station code: 8508205 (SIGN)
- Fare zone: 141/147 (Libero)

Passengers
- 2023: 810 per weekday (BLS)

Services
Preceding station	Bern S-Bahn	Following station
Bowil towards Laupen BE	S2	Emmenmatt towards Langnau i.E.
Zäziwil towards Bern	S22 Rush-hour service	Langnau i.E. One-way operation
Zäziwil One-way operation	S22 Rush-hour service	Langnau i.E. Terminus
Location

Signau railway station (German: Bahnhof Signau) is a railway station in the municipality of Signau, in the Swiss canton of Bern. It is an intermediate stop on the standard gauge Bern–Lucerne line of Swiss Federal Railways.

== Services ==
As of the December 2024 timetable change, the following services stop at Signau:

- Bern S-Bahn:
  - S2: half-hourly service between Laupen BE and Langnau.
  - S22: rush-hour service on weekdays between Bern and Langnau.
