= Emmenmatt railway station =

Railway station in Lauperswil, Switzerland

Emmenmatt
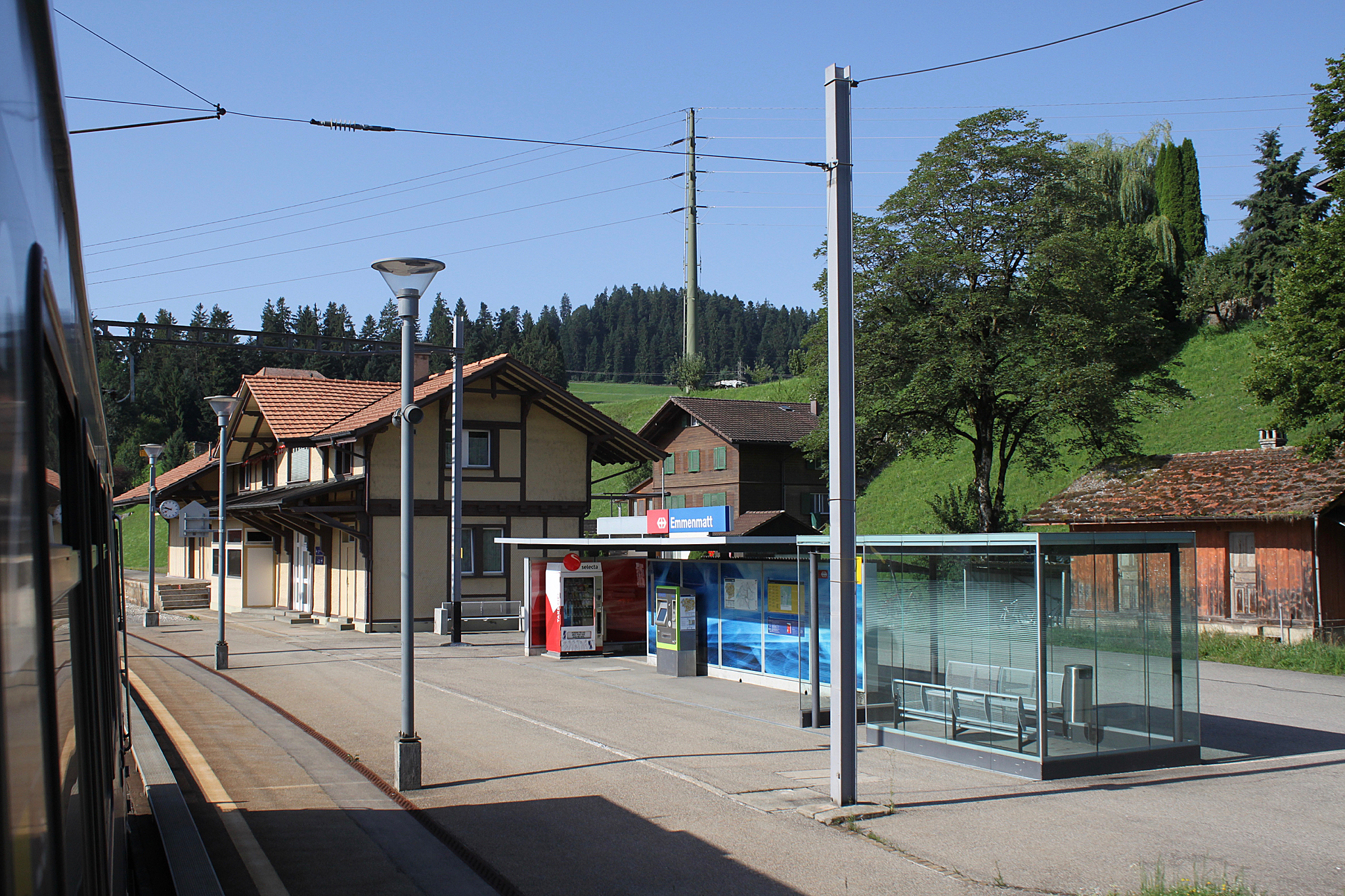
- The station building in 2017

General information
- Location: Lauperswil; Switzerland
- Coordinates: 46°56′53″N 7°44′50″E
- Elevation: 650 m (2,130 ft)
- Owner: Swiss Federal Railways
- Line: Bern–Lucerne line
- Platforms: 1 side platform
- Tracks: 4
- Train operators: BLS AG

Construction
- Parking: Yes (16 spaces)
- Cycle facilities: Yes (32 spaces)
- Accessible: No

Other information
- Station code: 8508206 (EMM)
- Fare zone: 141 (Libero)

Passengers
- 2023: 220 per weekday (BLS)

Services
Preceding station	Bern S-Bahn	Following station
Signau towards Laupen BE	S2	Langnau i.E. Terminus
Location

Emmenmatt railway station (German: Bahnhof Emmenmatt) is a railway station in the municipality of Lauperswil, in the Swiss canton of Bern. It is an intermediate stop on the standard gauge Bern–Lucerne line of Swiss Federal Railways.

== Services ==
As of the December 2024 timetable change, the following services stop at Emmenmatt:

- Bern S-Bahn: S2: half-hourly service between Laupen BE and Langnau.
