= Flamatt railway station =

Railway station in Wünnewil-Flamatt, Switzerland

Flamatt
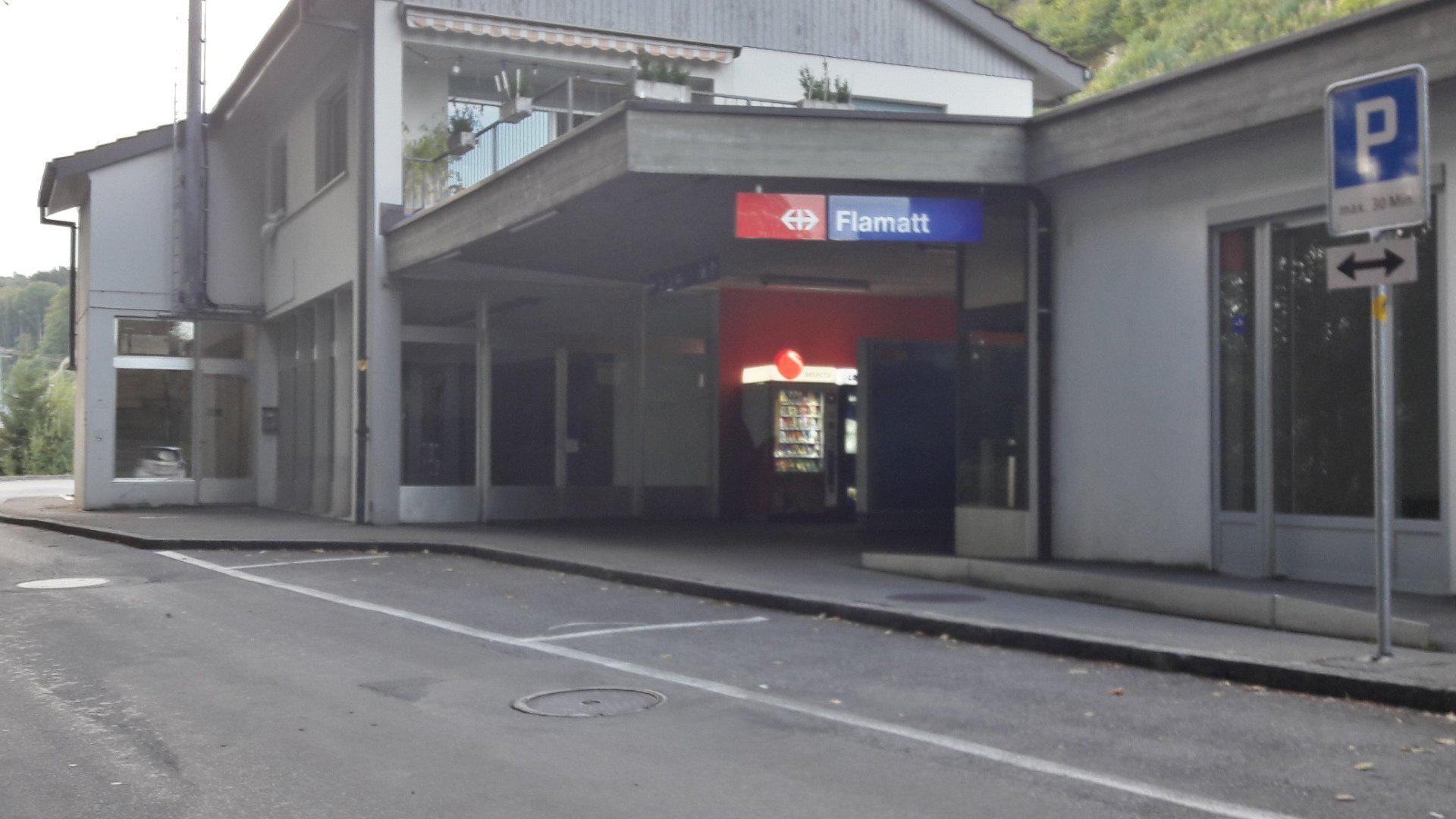
- The station building in 2018

General information
- Location: Wünnewil-Flamatt; Switzerland
- Coordinates: 46°53′19″N 7°19′10″E
- Elevation: 552 m (1,811 ft)
- Owner: Swiss Federal Railways
- Lines: Flamatt–Laupen line; Lausanne–Bern line
- Distance: 84.1 km (52.3 mi) from Lausanne
- Platforms: 3 side platforms
- Tracks: 3
- Train operators: BLS AG; Transports publics Fribourgeois
- Connections: PostAuto AG buses

Construction
- Parking: Yes (23 spaces)
- Accessible: Yes

Other information
- Station code: 8504103 (FLM)
- Fare zone: 14 (frimobil); 699 (Libero)

Passengers
- 2023: 1'600 per weekday (BLS, SBB)

Services
Preceding station	RER Fribourg	Following station
Düdingen One-way operation	RE2	Bern Terminus
Preceding station	Bern S-Bahn	Following station
Wünnewil towards Fribourg/Freiburg	S1	Thörishaus Dorf towards Thun
Flamatt Dorf towards Laupen BE	S2	Thörishaus Dorf towards Langnau i.E.
Location

Flamatt railway station (German: Bahnhof Flamatt) is a railway station in the municipality of Wünnewil-Flamatt, in the Swiss canton of Fribourg. It sits at the junction of the standard gauge Flamatt–Laupen line of the Sensetalbahn and the Lausanne–Bern line of Swiss Federal Railways.

== Services ==
As of the December 2025 timetable change, the following services stop at Flamatt:

- RER Fribourg RE2: hourly service between Broc-Chocolaterie and Bern.
- Bern S-Bahn:
  - S1: half-hourly service between Fribourg/Freiburg and Thun.
  - S2: half-hourly service between Laupen BE and Langnau.
