= Neumühle railway station =

Railway station in Lauperswil, Switzerland

Neumühle
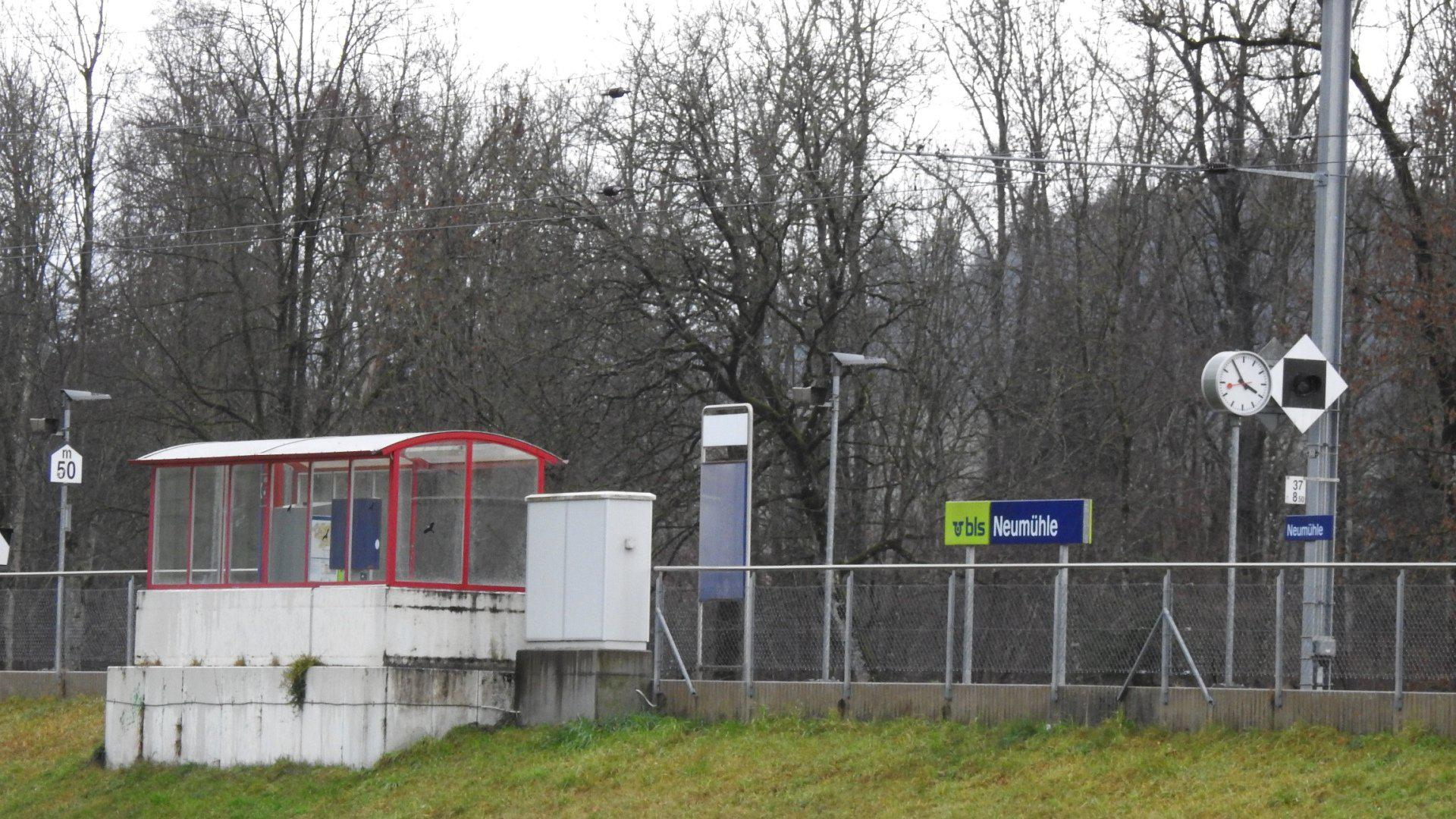
- The station platform in 2018

General information
- Location: Lauperswil; Switzerland
- Coordinates: 46°57′58″N 7°44′56″E
- Elevation: 633 m (2,077 ft)
- Owner: BLS AG
- Line: Solothurn–Langnau line
- Distance: 37.6 km (23.4 mi) from Solothurn
- Platforms: 1 side platform
- Tracks: 1
- Train operators: BLS AG
- Connections: Busland AG bus line

Construction
- Accessible: Yes

Other information
- Station code: 8508269 (NM)
- Fare zone: 141 (Libero)

Passengers
- 2023: 90 per weekday (BLS)

Services
Preceding station	Bern S-Bahn	Following station
Zollbrück towards Thun	S4	Langnau i.E. Terminus
Location

Neumühle railway station (German: Bahnhof Neumühle) is a railway station in the municipality of Lauperswil, in the Swiss canton of Bern. It is an intermediate stop and request stop on the standard gauge Solothurn–Langnau line of BLS AG.

== Services ==
As of the December 2024 timetable change, the following services stop at Neumühle:

- Bern S-Bahn S4: hourly service between Thun and Langnau.
