= Neuenegg =

- Municipality
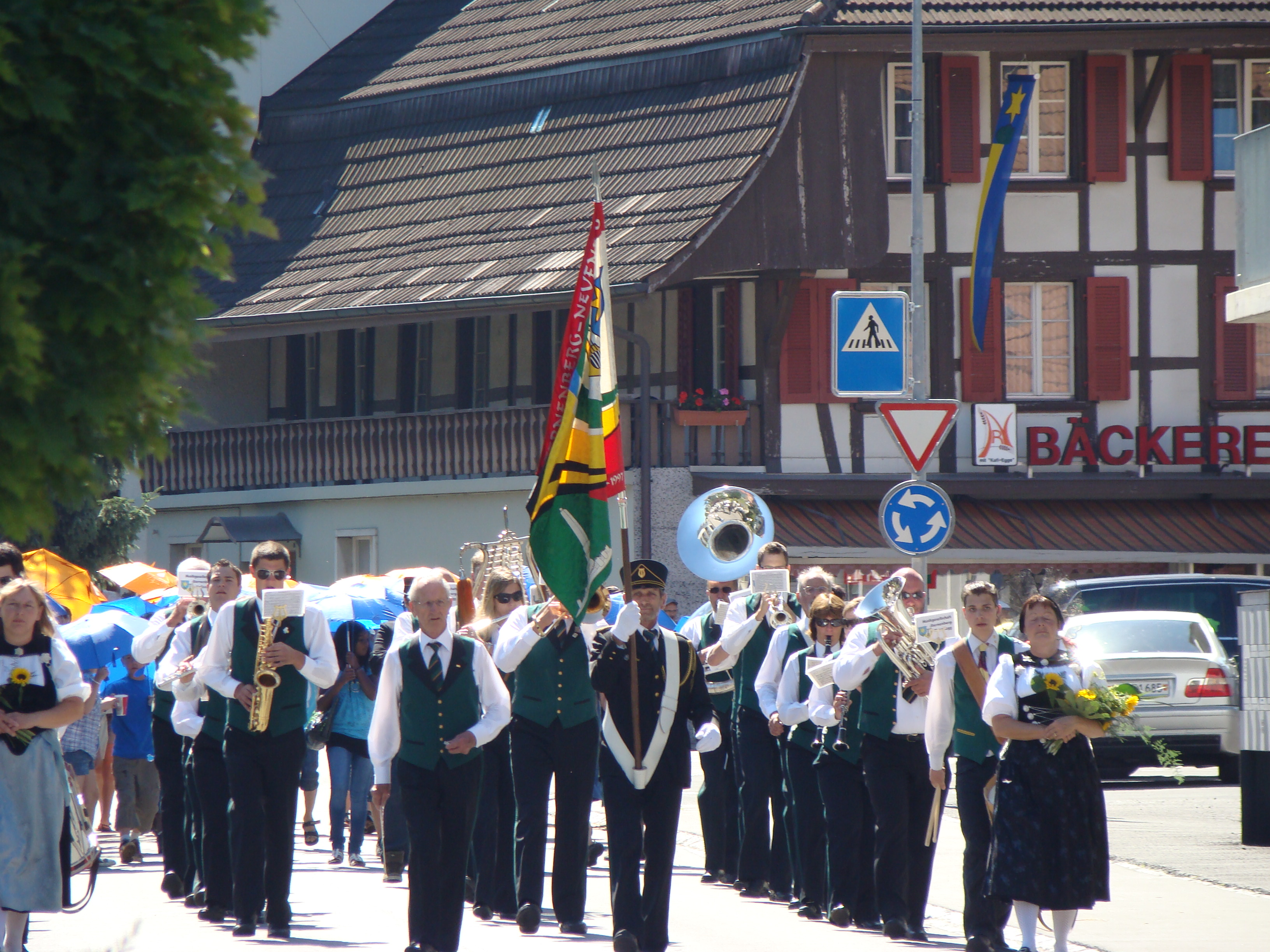
- Student procession in 2011, led by the Sternenberg Neuenegg Music Society

- Flag Coat of arms
- Location of Neuenegg
- Location within Switzerland Location within Canton of Bern
- Coordinates: 46°54′N 7°18′E
- Country: Switzerland
- Canton: Bern
- District: Bern-Mittelland

Government
  - Executive: Gemeinderat with 7 members
  - Mayor: Gemeindepräsident(in); Marlise Gerteis-Schwarz SVP/UDC (as of 2026)

Area
  - Total: 22.0 km^{2} (8.5 sq mi)
- Elevation: 525 m (1,722 ft)

Population (December 2020)
  - Total: 5,601
  - Density: 255/km^{2} (659/sq mi)
- Time zone: UTC+01:00 (CET)
  - Summer (DST): UTC+02:00 (CEST)
- Postal code: 3176
- SFOS number: 670
- ISO 3166 code: CH-BE
- Localities: Au, Bärfischenhaus, Bramberg, Brüggelbach, Freiburghaus, Süri, Thörishaus, Wyden
- Surrounded by: Bern (Bern), Bösingen (FR), Köniz, Laupen, Mühleberg, Ueberstorf (FR), Wünnewil-Flamatt (FR)
- Website: www.neuenegg.ch

Neuenegg is a municipality in the Bern-Mittelland administrative district in the canton of Bern in Switzerland.

== History ==
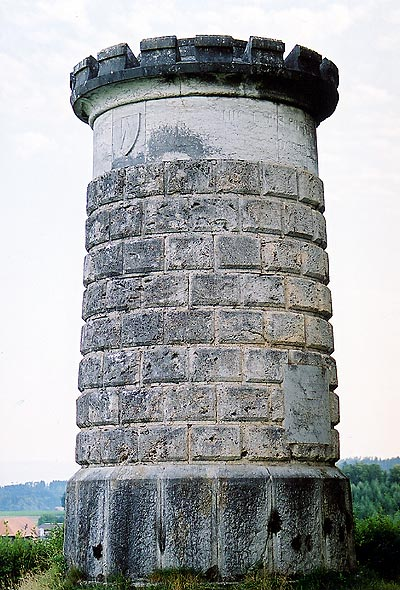
Memorial on the Bramberg for the Battle of Laupen

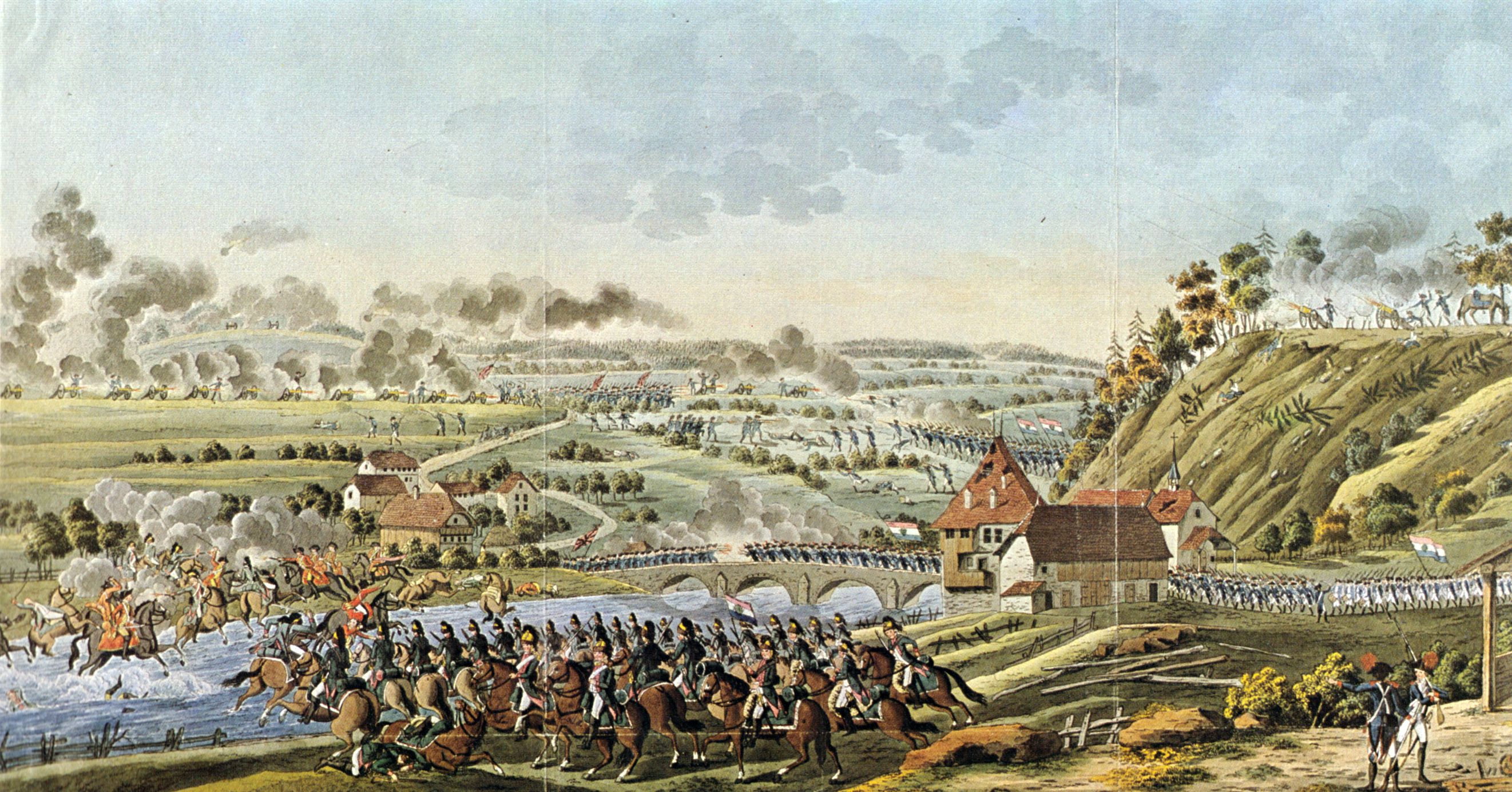
The Battle of Neuenegg, 1798.

Neuenegg is first mentioned in 1228 as Nuneca. In 1235 it was mentioned as Nuwenegge.

During the Middle Ages, Neuenegg was part of the Herrschaft of Laupen. In 1324, the entire Herrschaft was acquired by Bern. Neuenegg was one of the six courts of the new Bernese bailiwick of Laupen. Initially the court was held in the church yard, then it moved to the village pub. In 1339, during the Battle of Laupen, the Bernese and Swiss Confederation forces deployed on the Bramberg hill near Neuenegg. Fribourg, Burgundian and Habsburg forces attacked the hill and after heavy fighting were driven away with heavy losses. The Swiss and Bernese victory on the Bramberg brought Bern into closer association with the Swiss Confederacy, becoming one of the Eight Cantons in 1353.

The village parish church of St. John was first mentioned in 1227 when Emperor Frederick II granted it to the Teutonic Knights. The current aisle was built in the 13th or 14th century, the choir is from 1452 and the church tower was built in 1512–16. The first village school was built in the 17th century.

During the French invasion of 1798 a major battle was fought near Neuenegg. Under the command of Johann Rudolf von Graffenried the Bernese triumphed over numerically superior French troops under Brigadier General Pigeon on 5 March 1798. However, after the Bernese defeat that same day at the Battle of Grauholz, the collapse of the Ancien Régime could no longer be avoided.

Neuenegg was located near the Bern-Fribourg trade road. In 1470 Fribourg built a bridge across the Sense river at Neuenegg and brought the road directly through the town. It remained on the main road for several centuries. However, in the 19th century, the new, main cantonal road bypassed Neuenegg. In 1860 a railroad line was built which also bypassed the village. It wasn't until 1903 that the Flamatt-Gümmenen rail line was built through the town. In the same year, Nestlé opened a milk processing factory in Neuenegg. In 1927 the Bernese company Wander AG acquired the factory to produce Ovaltine. In 1967 the factory was acquired by Sandoz AG and Novartis AG when they acquired Wander. In 2002 Associated British Foods acquired the company and the factory, which is still one of the largest employers in the municipality.

== Geography ==
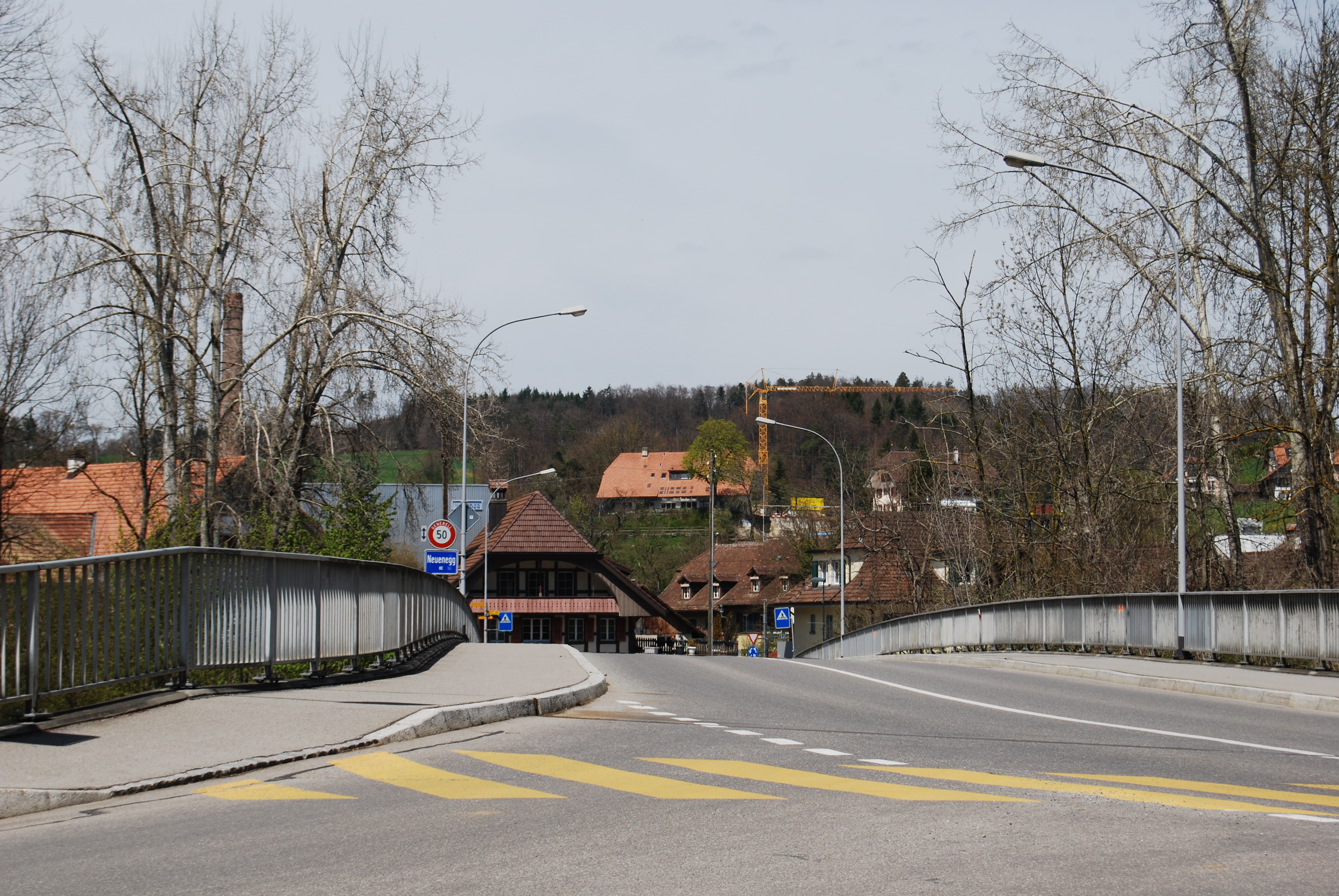
Bridge over the Sense river in Neuenegg

Neuenegg has an area of 21.83 km^{2} (8.43 sq mi). As of 2012, a total of 11.49 km^{2} (4.44 mi^{2}) or 52.5% is used for agricultural purposes, while 8.35 km^{2} (3.22 mi^{2}) or 38.2% is forested. Of the rest of the land, 1.97 km^{2} (0.76 mi^{2}) or 9.0% is settled (buildings or roads), 0.15 km^{2} (37 acres) or 0.7% is either rivers or lakes.

During the same year, housing and buildings made up 5.1% and transportation infrastructure made up 2.7%. Out of the forested land, 37.1% of the total land area is heavily forested and 1.1% is covered with orchards or small clusters of trees. Of the agricultural land, 35.7% is used for growing crops and 15.0% is pastures, while 1.9% is used for orchards or vine crops. All the water in the municipality is flowing water.

It is located on a plateau on the right bank of the Sense River. It includes the village of Neuenegg and half of Thörishaus as well as a number of hamlets including Bärfischenhaus, Bramberg, Brügelbach and Landstuhl. It also includes a portion of the Forsts, a nature preserve in Bern.

On 31 December 2009 Amtsbezirk Laupen, the municipality's former district, was dissolved. On the following day, 1 January 2010, it joined the newly created Verwaltungskreis Bern-Mittelland.

== Coat of arms ==
The blazon of the municipal coat of arms is Azure a Mullet Or on a Mount of 3 Coupeaux Vert.

== Demographics ==
Neuenegg has a population (as of December 2020) of 5,601. As of 2010, 9.5% of the population are resident foreign nationals. Over the last 10 years (2001-2011) the population has changed at a rate of 0.2%. Migration accounted for -0.1%, while births and deaths accounted for 0.3%.

Most of the population (as of 2000) speaks German (4,058 or 93.0%) as their first language, French is the second most common (50 or 1.1%) and Italian is the third (30 or 0.7%). There are 3 people who speak Romansh.

As of 2008, the population was 50.4% male and 49.6% female. The population was made up of 2,193 Swiss men (45.0% of the population) and 264 (5.4%) non-Swiss men. There were 2,219 Swiss women (45.5%) and 198 (4.1%) non-Swiss women. Of the population in the municipality, 1,313 or about 30.1% were born in Neuenegg and lived there in 2000. There were 1,728 or 39.6% who were born in the same canton, while 774 or 17.7% were born somewhere else in Switzerland, and 418 or 9.6% were born outside of Switzerland.

As of 2011, children and teenagers (0–19 years old) make up 19.9% of the population, while adults (20–64 years old) make up 60.7% and seniors (over 64 years old) make up 19.4%.

As of 2000, there were 1,703 people who were single and never married in the municipality. There were 2,215 married individuals, 231 widows or widowers and 213 individuals who are divorced.

As of 2010, there were 652 households that consist of only one person and 109 households with five or more people. In 2000, a total of 1,784 apartments (92.5% of the total) were permanently occupied, while 108 apartments (5.6%) were seasonally occupied and 37 apartments (1.9%) were empty. As of 2010, the construction rate of new housing units was 0.2 new units per 1000 residents. The vacancy rate for the municipality, in 2012, was 0.34%.

The historical population is given in the following chart:

== Politics ==
In the 2011 federal election the most popular party was the Swiss People's Party (SVP) which received 33.5% of the vote. The next three most popular parties were the Social Democratic Party (SP) (17.6%), the Conservative Democratic Party (BDP) (17.3%) and the FDP.The Liberals (7.4%). In the federal election, a total of 1,782 votes were cast, and the voter turnout was 49.2%.

== Economy ==
Aerial view of Neuenegg with Wander AG (1946)

As of 2011, Neuenegg had an unemployment rate of 2.16%. As of 2008, there were a total of 1,849 people employed in the municipality. Of these, there were 260 people employed in the primary economic sector and about 78 businesses involved in this sector. 671 people were employed in the secondary sector and there were 45 businesses in this sector. 918 people were employed in the tertiary sector, with 126 businesses in this sector. There were 2,371 residents of the municipality who were employed in some capacity, of which females made up 42.9% of the workforce.

In 2008 there were a total of 1,398 full-time equivalent jobs. The number of jobs in the primary sector was 174, all of which were in agriculture. The number of jobs in the secondary sector was 620 of which 556 or (89.7%) were in manufacturing and 63 (10.2%) were in construction. The number of jobs in the tertiary sector was 604. In the tertiary sector; 183 or 30.3% were in wholesale or retail sales or the repair of motor vehicles, 61 or 10.1% were in the movement and storage of goods, 44 or 7.3% were in a hotel or restaurant, 22 or 3.6% were in the information industry, 11 or 1.8% were the insurance or financial industry, 26 or 4.3% were technical professionals or scientists, 62 or 10.3% were in education and 58 or 9.6% were in health care.

In 2000, there were 808 workers who commuted into the municipality and 1,653 workers who commuted away. The municipality is a net exporter of workers, with about 2.0 workers leaving the municipality for every one entering. A total of 718 workers (47.1% of the 1,526 total workers in the municipality) both lived and worked in Neuenegg.

Of the working population, 21.9% used public transportation to get to work, and 53.8% used a private car.

In 2011 the average local and cantonal tax rate on a married resident of Neuenegg making 150,000 CHF was 12%, while an unmarried resident's rate was 17.6%. For comparison, the average rate for the entire canton in 2006 was 13.9% and the nationwide rate was 11.6%. In 2009 there were a total of 2,232 tax payers in the municipality. Of that total, 764 made over 75,000 CHF per year. There were 13 people who made between 15,000 and 20,000 per year. The average income of the over 75,000 CHF group in Neuenegg was 110,599 CHF, while the average across all of Switzerland was 130,478 CHF.

== Transport ==
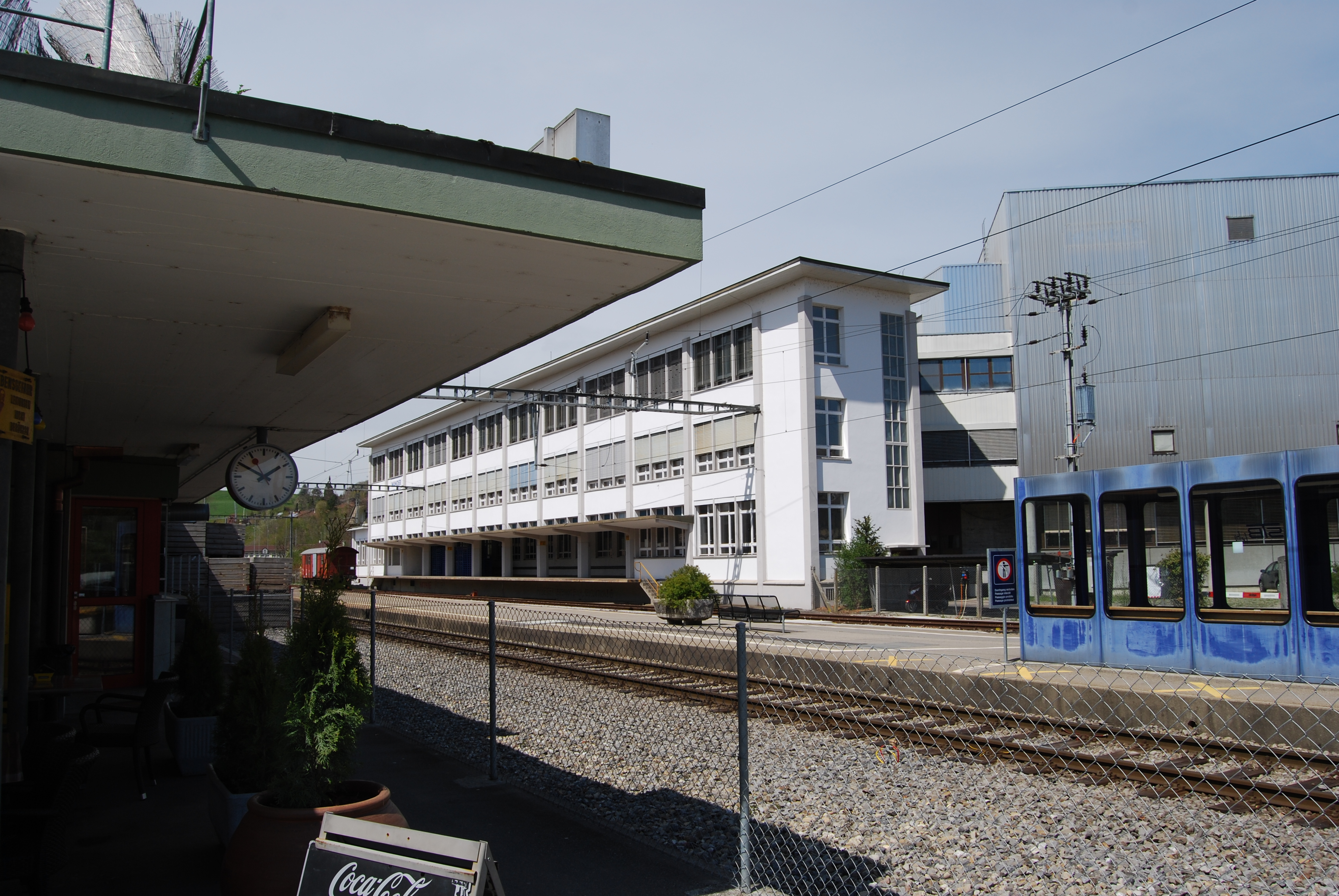
Neuenegg train station

The municipality is accessible by the A12, with the Swiss Federal Railways line at Neuenegg, and by bus (Neuenegg-Thörishaus Dorf). It is also served by the Neuenegg railway station.

== Religion ==
From the 2000 census, 3,110 or 71.3% belonged to the Swiss Reformed Church, while 575 or 13.2% were Roman Catholic. Of the rest of the population, there were 38 members of an Orthodox church (or about 0.87% of the population), there were 5 individuals (or about 0.11% of the population) who belonged to the Christian Catholic Church, and there were 280 individuals (or about 6.42% of the population) who belonged to another Christian church. There were 67 (or about 1.54% of the population) who were Islamic. There were 14 individuals who were Buddhist and 14 individuals who were Hindu. 285 (or about 6.53% of the population) belonged to no church, are agnostic or atheist, and 111 individuals (or about 2.54% of the population) did not answer the question.

== Education ==
In Neuenegg about 56.4% of the population have completed non-mandatory upper secondary education, and 20.5% have completed additional higher education (either university or a Fachhochschule). Of the 569 who had completed some form of tertiary schooling listed in the census, 74.3% were Swiss men, 19.5% were Swiss women, 4.0% were non-Swiss men and 2.1% were non-Swiss women.

The Canton of Bern school system provides one year of non-obligatory Kindergarten, followed by six years of Primary school. This is followed by three years of obligatory lower Secondary school where the students are separated according to ability and aptitude. Following the lower Secondary students may attend additional schooling or they may enter an apprenticeship.

During the 2011–12 school year, there were a total of 579 students attending classes in Neuenegg. There were 6 kindergarten classes with a total of 98 students in the municipality. Of the kindergarten students, 5.1% were permanent or temporary residents of Switzerland (not citizens) and 18.4% have a different mother language than the classroom language. The municipality had 19 primary classes and 321 students. Of the primary students, 12.8% were permanent or temporary residents of Switzerland (not citizens) and 24.6% have a different mother language than the classroom language. During the same year, there were 9 lower secondary classes with a total of 160 students. There were 15.6% who were permanent or temporary residents of Switzerland (not citizens) and 23.8% have a different mother language than the classroom language.

As of 2000, there were a total of 879 students attending any school in the municipality. Of those, 416 both lived and attended school in the municipality, while 463 students came from another municipality. During the same year, 153 residents attended schools outside the municipality.

Neuenegg is home to the Schul- und Gemeindebibliothek Neuenegg (municipal library of Neuenegg). The library has (as of 2008) 10,830 books or other media, and loaned out 26,126 items in the same year. It was open a total of 222 days with average of 12.5 hours per week during that year.
