= Flamatt–Laupen–Gümmenen railway line =

Railway line in Switzerland

Flamatt–Laupen–Gümmenen

Overview
- Native name: Sensetalbahn
- Owner: SBB
- Line number: 253
- Termini: Flamatt; Laupen

Service
- Operator(s): BLS AG

Technical
- Line length: 11.45 km (7.11 mi) (until 1993); 6.84 km (4.25 mi)
- Number of tracks: 1
- Track gauge: 1,435 mm (4 ft 8 1/2 in) standard gauge
- Minimum radius: 180 m (590 ft)
- Electrification: 15 kV/16.7 Hz AC overhead catenary
- Maximum incline: 3.6%

The Flamatt–Laupen–Gümmenen railway line is a line in Switzerland that was built and formerly operated by the Sense Valley Railway (German: Sensetalbahn, STB). The 11.5 km-long standard-gauge line on the Flamatt–Laupen–Gümmenen route through the Sense valley was opened on 20 January 1904. The shares of the company were acquired by the Swiss Federal Railways (SBB) and Swiss Post (34 %) in 2001. Since then, the infrastructure of the Sense Valley Railway has been operated by the SBB under contract.

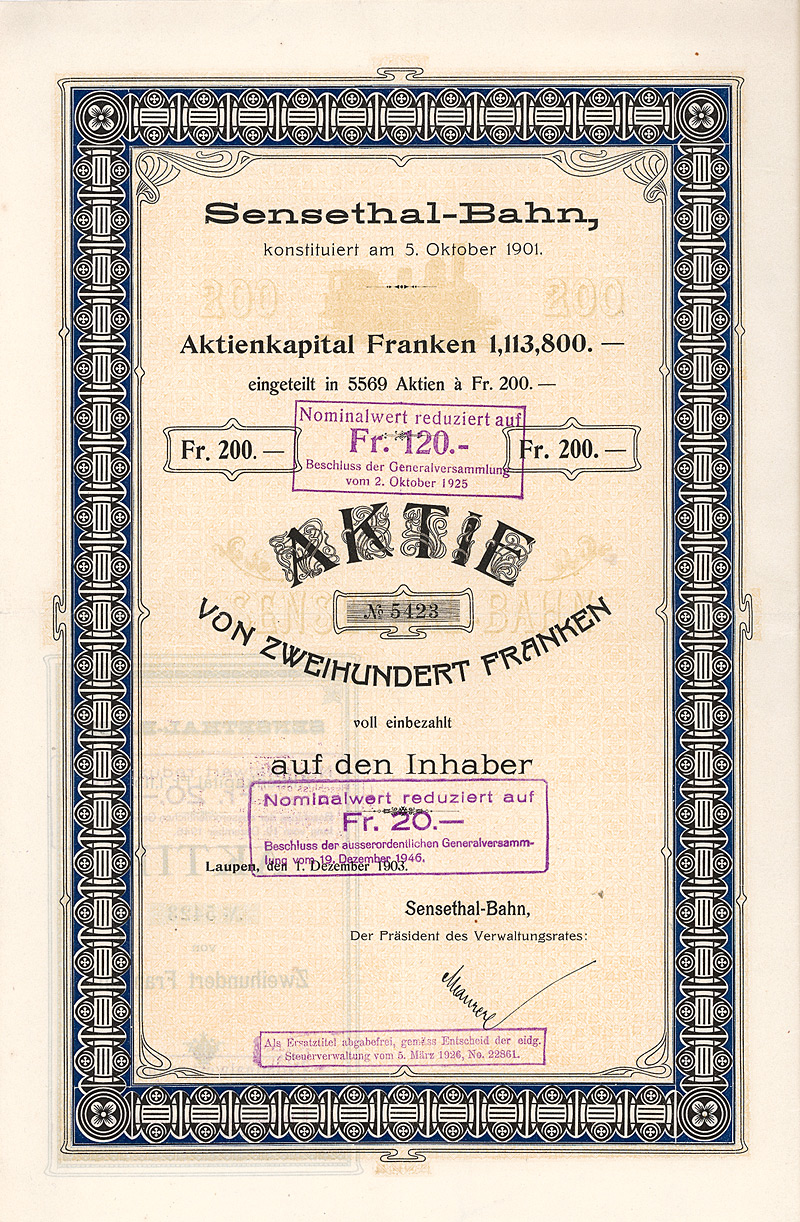
Share issued with a face value of CHF 200 on 1 December 1903

== Rolling stock ==
Initially, the train traffic was hauled by Ed 3/4 steam-locomotives. They were too heavy and were replaced by so-called glass boxes, Ed 2/2 steam locomotives. A Kittel steam railcar built in Esslingen in 1908 and originally owned by the Prussian military railway was purchased in 1921. With the electrification of the line, the railway procured a CFe 2/4 101 railcar from SWS and SAAS. Until it was delivered in December, the STB rented Ce 4/4 13502, an MFO test locomotive for electric operations on the Seebach–Wettingen line, along with railcars, from the SBB. Locomotive 13502 was purchased in 1940 and was then used as Ce 4/4 1. It was sold to the SBB in 1964, so that it could be exhibited in the Swiss Museum of Transport. The railway company bought an ABe 4/4 railcar from the Swiss Southeastern Railway (Schweizerischen Südostbahn; SOB) in both 1958 and 1964, which were used as Be 4/4 nos. 106 and 107. These were supplemented in 1974 with converted control car Bti 201, which had been acquired from the Bern–Lötschberg–Simplon railway (BLS). The last railcars of the STB, BDe 4/6 102 and 103, which had been built in 1938, were taken over from the BLS in 1985. Their old age soon became noticeable and the last trains of the STB included a push-pull train rented from the Sihltal Zürich Uetliberg Bahn (SZU). Diesel locomotives Tm 238 111 and 114, which had been retained for freight traffic, were sold to the SBB in 2000.

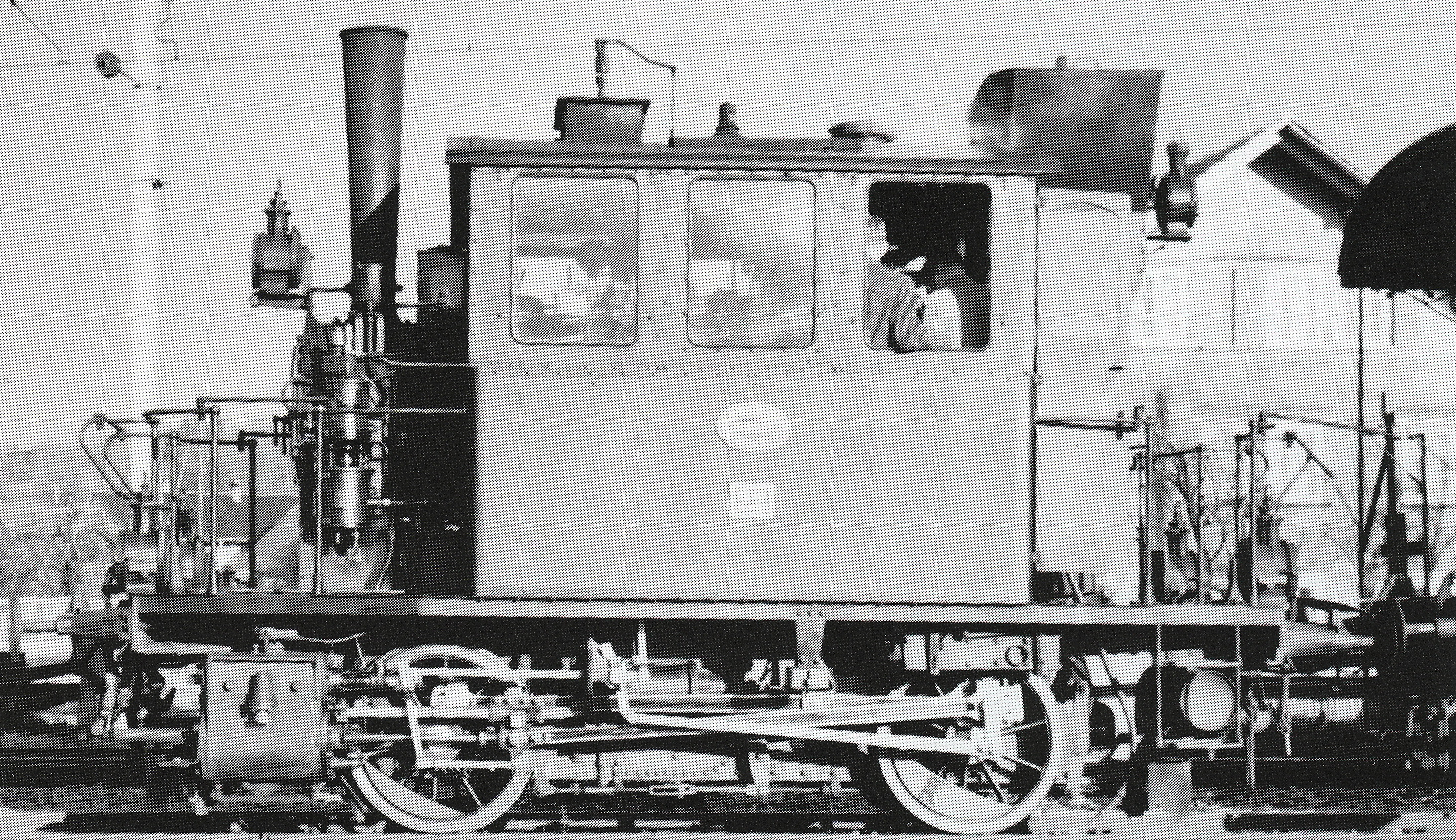
"Glass boxes" Ed 2/2 22

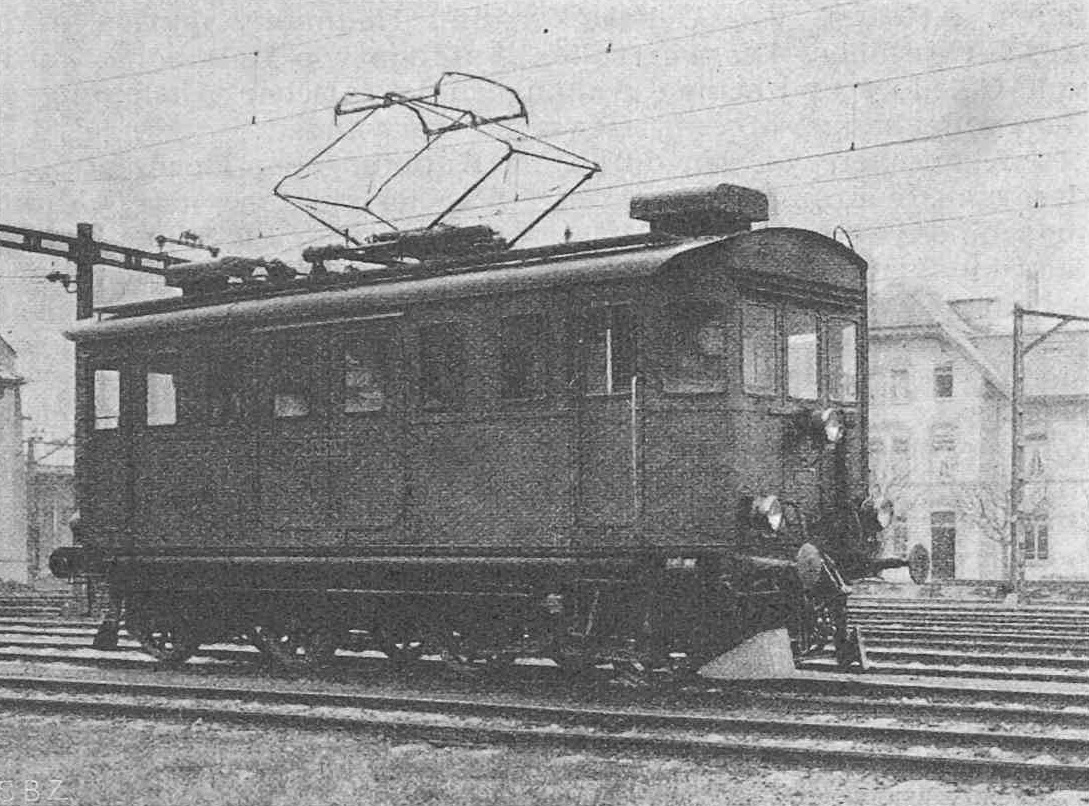
Ce 4/4 1 "Marianne"

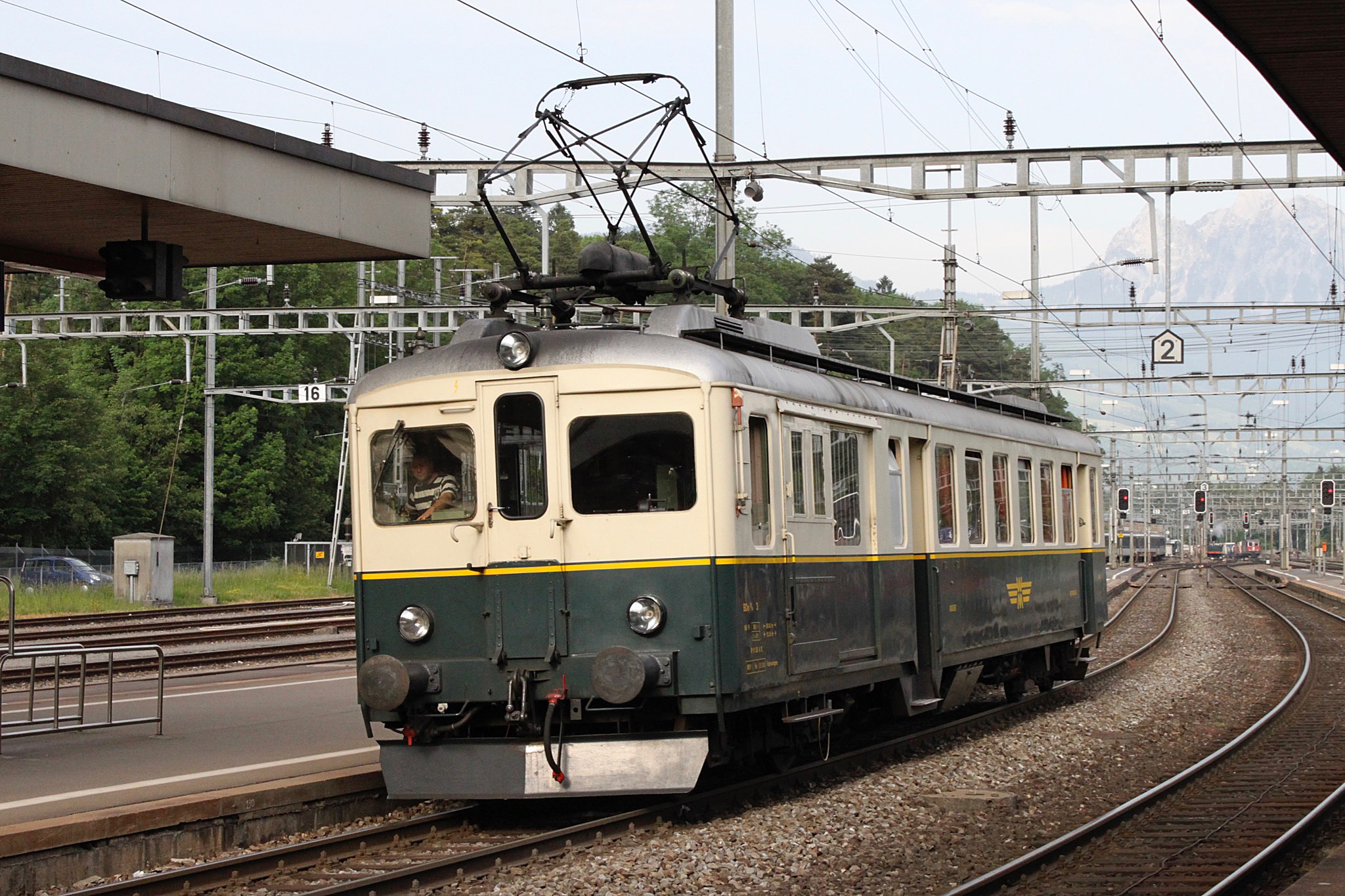
BDe 2/4 101, here operated as "Dame du Léman" of the Museumsbahn Compagnie ferroviaire du Léman

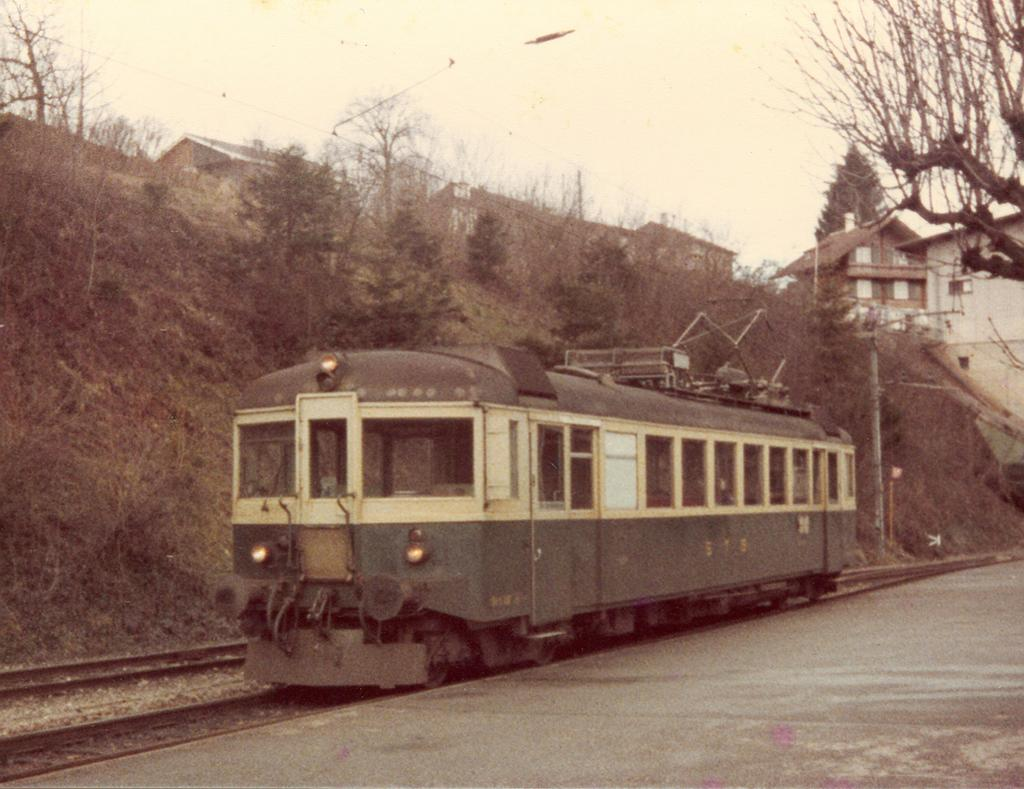
Be 4/4 106 in Gümmenen

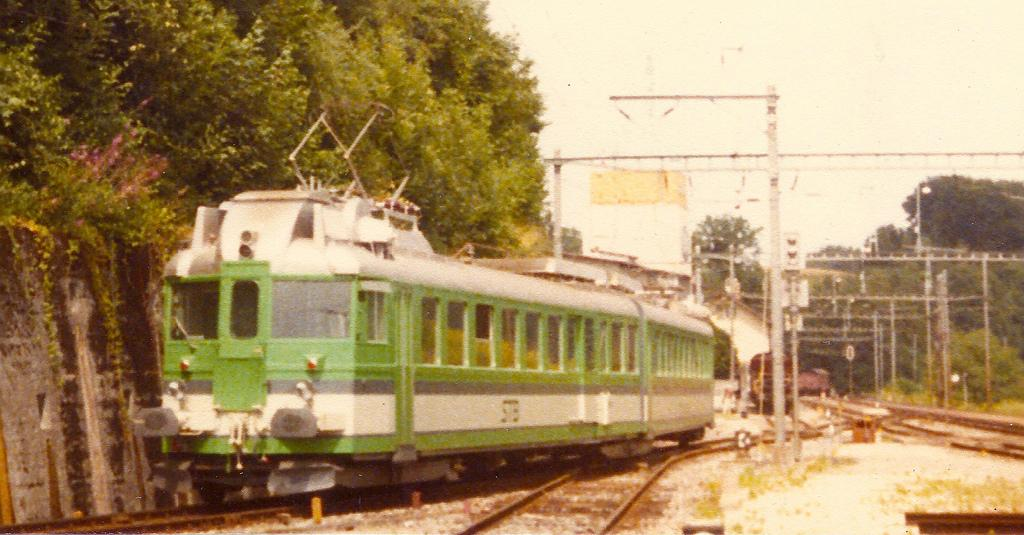
BDe 4/6 102

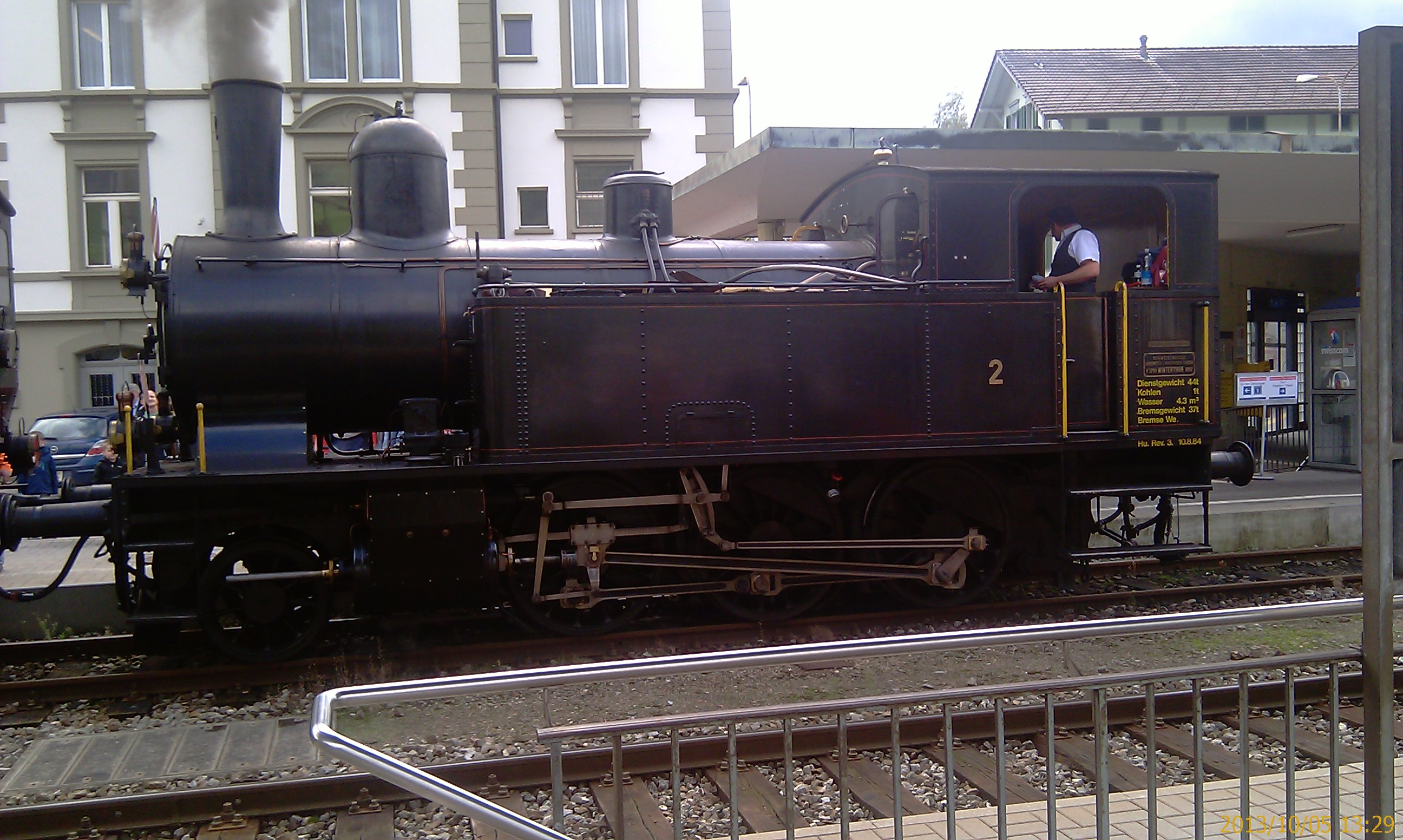
Ed 3/4 2 of the Solothurn–Moutier railway, identical to Ed 3/4 31 and 32 of the Sense Valley railway

== End of operations ==
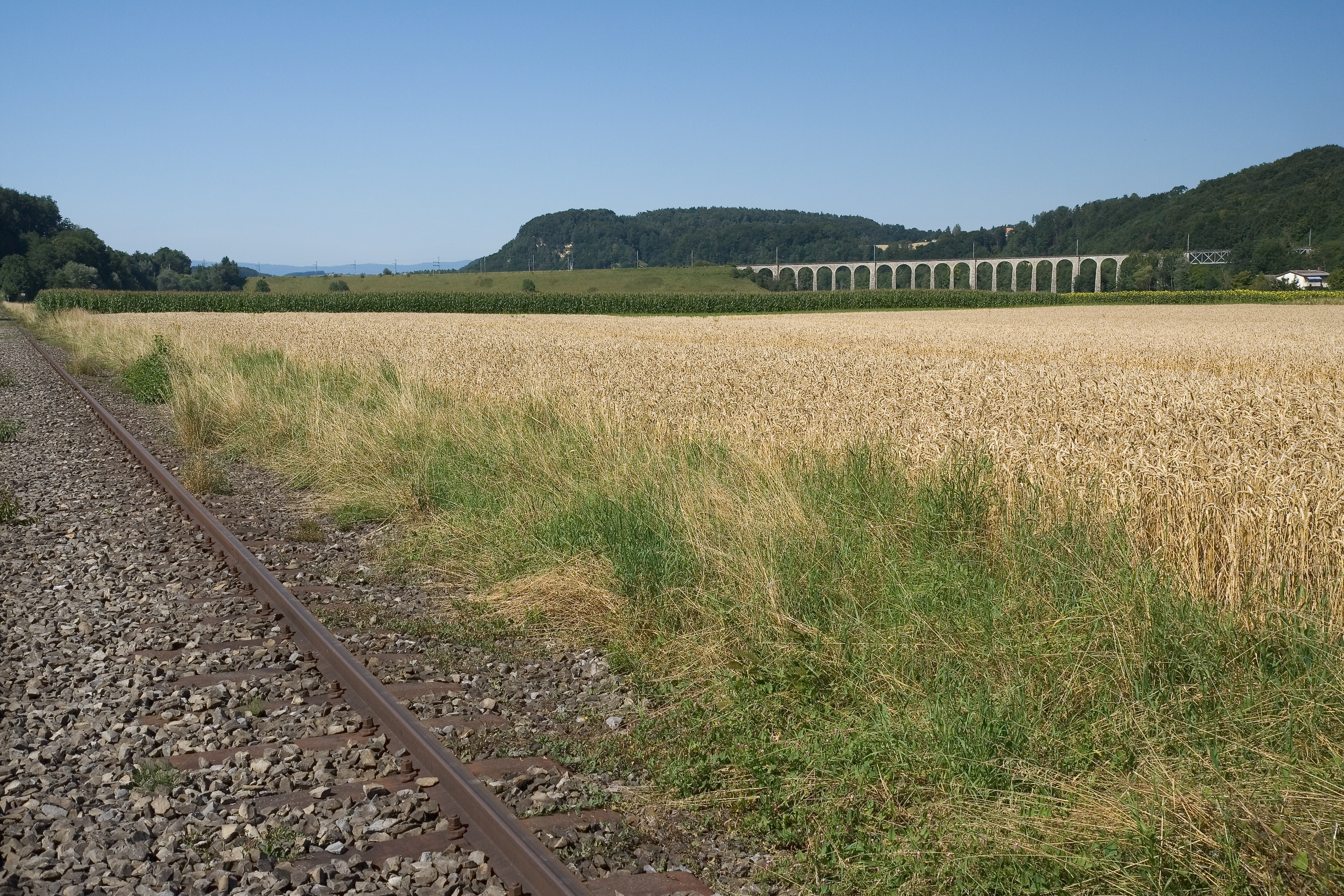
View of the disused Sense Valley Railway to the Gümmenen Viaduct

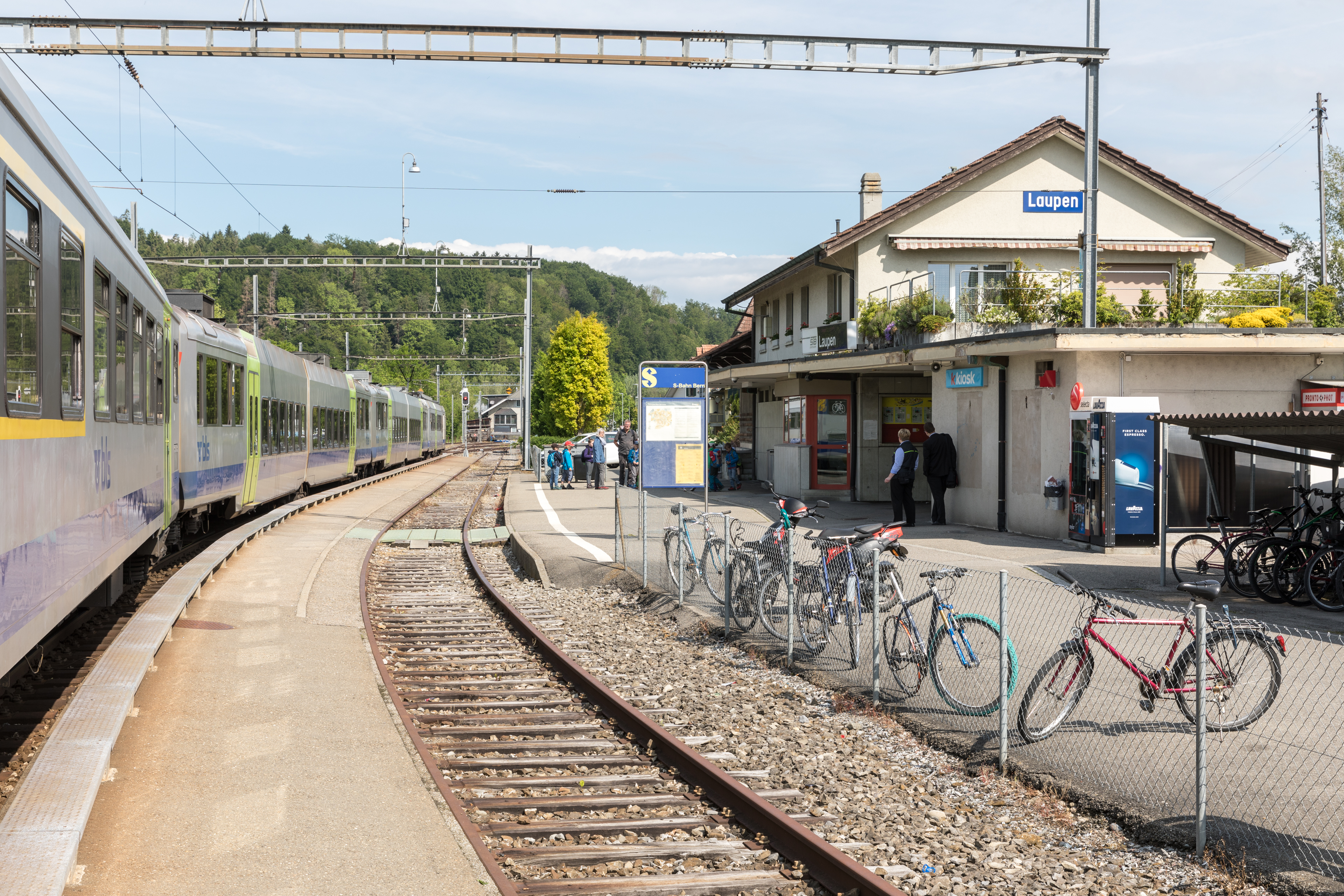
End of the line: the line from Bern to Laupen is served by the BLS.

The railway line between Laupen and Gümmenen was closed on 23 May 1993 and replaced by buses. The trains only operated between Laupen and Flamatt. From 2001, the trains were operated by the SBB and from December 2004—with the introduction of the Bern S-Bahn by BLS Lötschbergbahn, now BLS AG. Freight traffic was greatly reduced as a result of reduced production at the large Amcor Rentsch Laupen printing works, the closure of the oil reserve in Laupen and structural changes in industry. SBB Cargo has had no freight customers on the STB line since 2005.

The closed route between Gümmenen and Laupen is now used for tourism. Rail-cycle draisines can be rented in Laupen to run on the track to Gümmenen. In front of the viaduct there is a picnic area where it is possible to turn the draisines around. The tracks were dismantled for about 60 metres at both ends in Laupen and Gümmenen, so the line is no longer passable by trains.

The railway infrastructure between Flamatt and Laupen as well as a concession to operate railway infrastructure are still owned by the Sense Valley Railway Company, which is managed by SBB. BLS trains run every half hour to Laupen with trains crossing in Neuenegg. The former signal box built in 1966 was operated locally. A new signal box has been in operation since 13 April 2012. It was remotely controlled from Bern from 2012 to 2015 and has been subsequently controlled from Olten. There are plans to operate this in a simplified form (as a dead-end siding) to Laupen station so that the line would run only as far as the bridge over the Sense. Thus would eliminate one level crossing. In the autumn of 2014, all unprotected level crossings were closed and replaced by a new crossing at Freiburghaus equipped with a barrier system.

Service was suspended between Flamatt and Laupen on December 16, 2019, to permit reconstruction of the route and its stations, including a completely new station at Laupen. Service resumed in April 2021.

== Bus operations ==
The Sense Valley Railway Company had concessions for the Thörishaus–Neuenegg–Laupen–Gümmenen and Kerzers–Golaten–Wileroltigen–Gurbrü bus routes. In addition, it operated a bus route on behalf of PostBus.

- 30.130 Thörishaus Dorf–Neuenegg–(Laupen)
- 30.541 Kerzers–Golaten–Wileroltigen–Gurbrü
- 30.550 Laupen-Gümmenen
- 30.560 Mühleberg–Allenlüften–Rosshäusern (on behalf of PostBus)

These concessions were transferred to PostBus on 13 December 2009 and as a result the Sense Valley Railway withdrew from this business.

The Sense Valley Railway also had licenses for the "Nightbird" night bus routes on the Zürich–Lucerne, Brugg–Basel and Brugg–Olten routes.
