= Laupen BE railway station =

Railway station in Laupen, Switzerland

Laupen BE
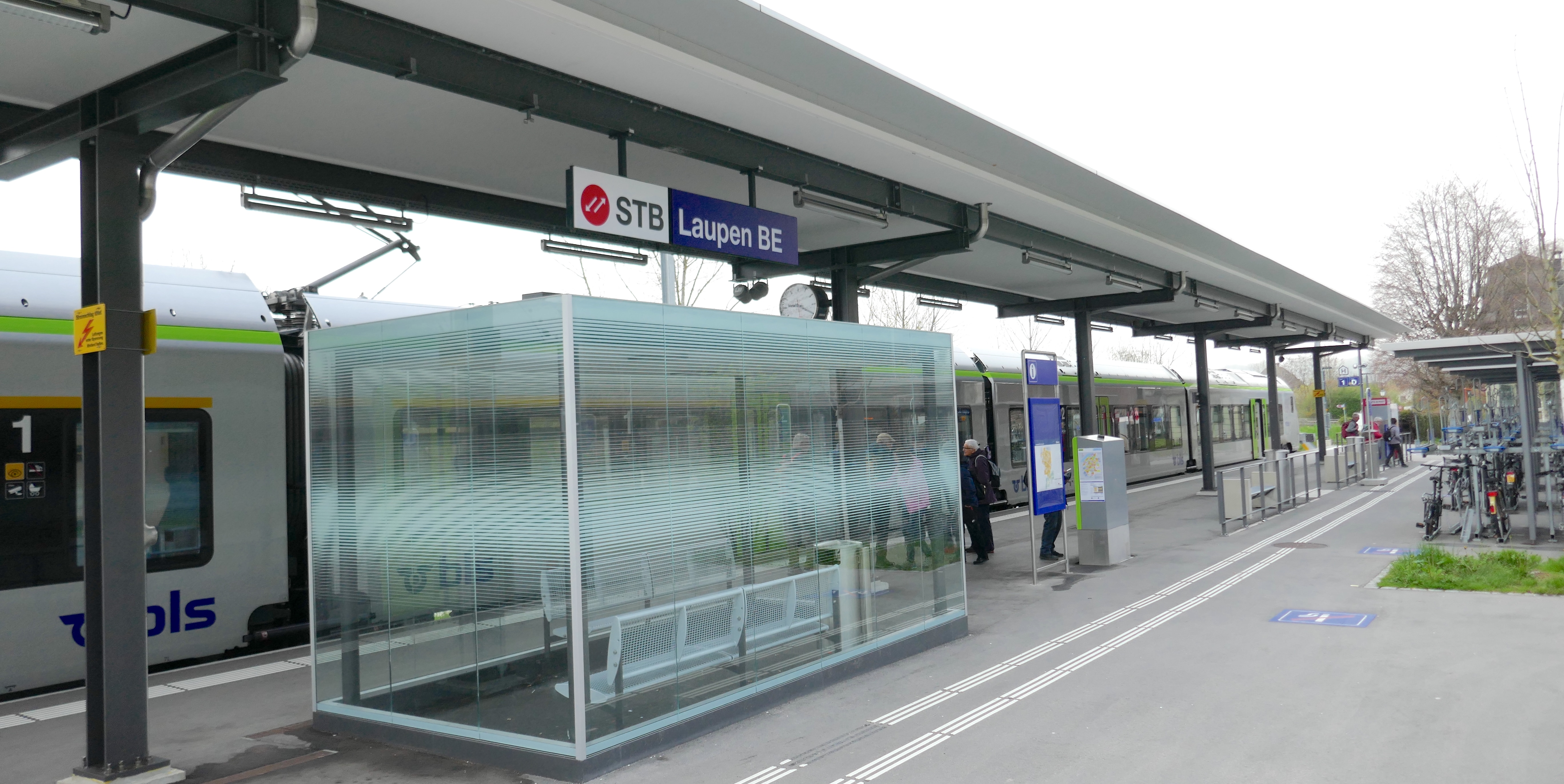
- The station in 2023

General information
- Location: Laupen, Bern; Switzerland
- Coordinates: 46°54′05″N 7°14′27″E
- Elevation: 489 m (1,604 ft)
- Owner: Sensetalbahn
- Line: Flamatt–Laupen line
- Distance: 6.8 km (4.2 mi) from Flamatt
- Platforms: 1 side platform
- Tracks: 1
- Train operators: BLS AG
- Connections: PostAuto AG buses

Construction
- Parking: Yes (49 spaces)
- Cycle facilities: Yes (192 spaces)
- Accessible: Yes

Other information
- Station code: 8504194 (LPN)
- Fare zone: 13 (frimobil); 698 (Libero)

Passengers
- 2023: 1'400 per weekday (BLS)

Services
Preceding station	Bern S-Bahn	Following station
Terminus	S2	Neuenegg towards Langnau i.E.
Location

Laupen BE railway station (German: Bahnhof Laupen BE) is a railway station in the municipality of Laupen, in the Swiss canton of Bern. It is the western terminus of the standard gauge Flamatt–Laupen line of the Sensetalbahn. The station was relocated in 2021.

== History ==
Prior to 2021, the station building was located on the Bahnhofstrasse, to the north of the Bösingenstrasse. As part of a major reconstruction project between 2019 and 2021 a new station was built 250 metres (820 ft) to the southeast, on the other side of the Bösingenstrasse, and in the direction of Neuenegg. The new station has a single 330-metre (1,080 ft)-long side platform. There is parking space for 243 bicycles, both in front of the station and on the old right-of-way between the platform and the Bösingenstrasse. A gravel path between the station and the river Sense runs from Laupen to Neuenegg. The new station opened, with the rest of the line, in April 2021.

== Services ==
As of the December 2024 timetable change, the following services stop at Laupen BE:

- Bern S-Bahn: S2: half-hourly service to Langnau.

== Images ==
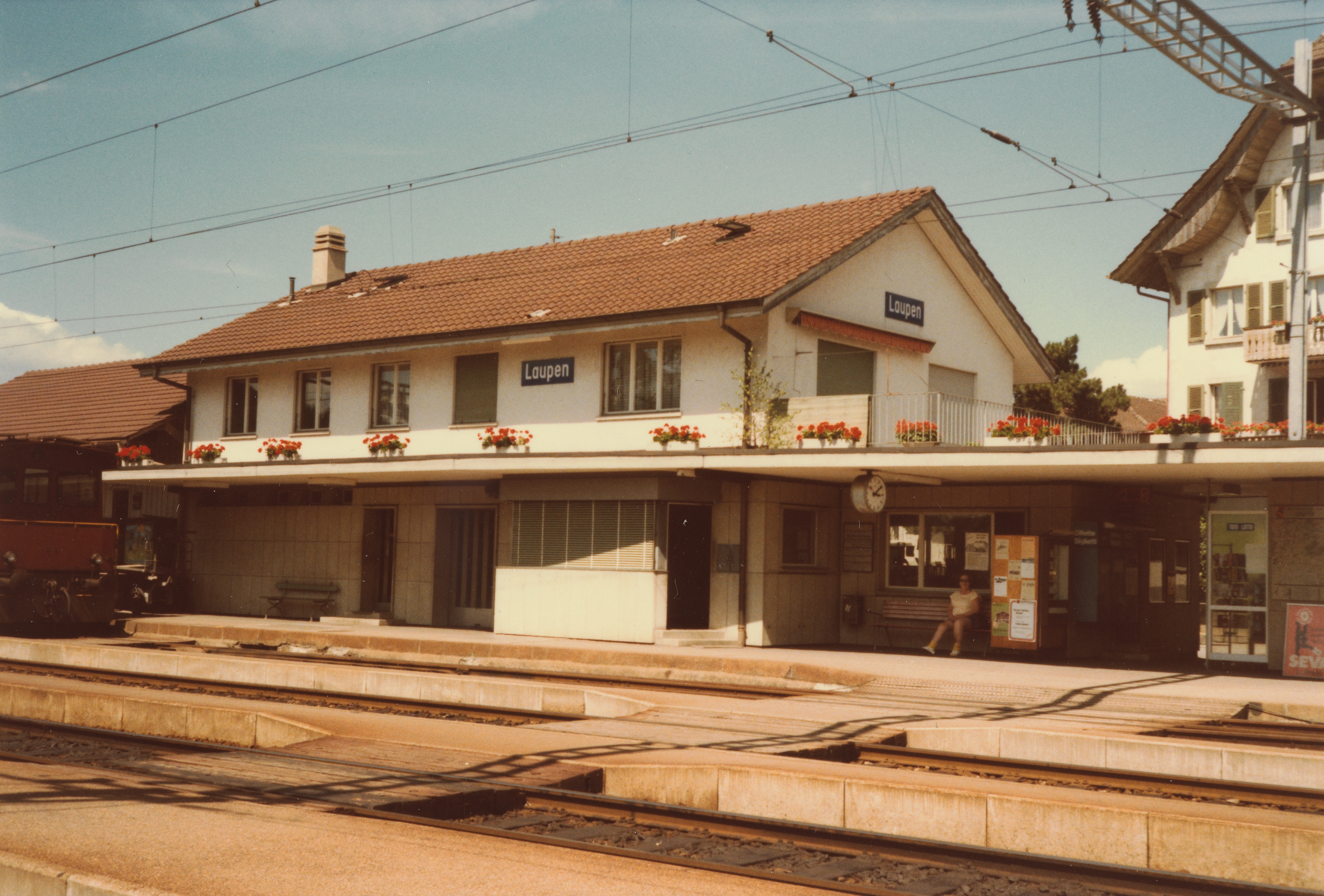
old station (1985)

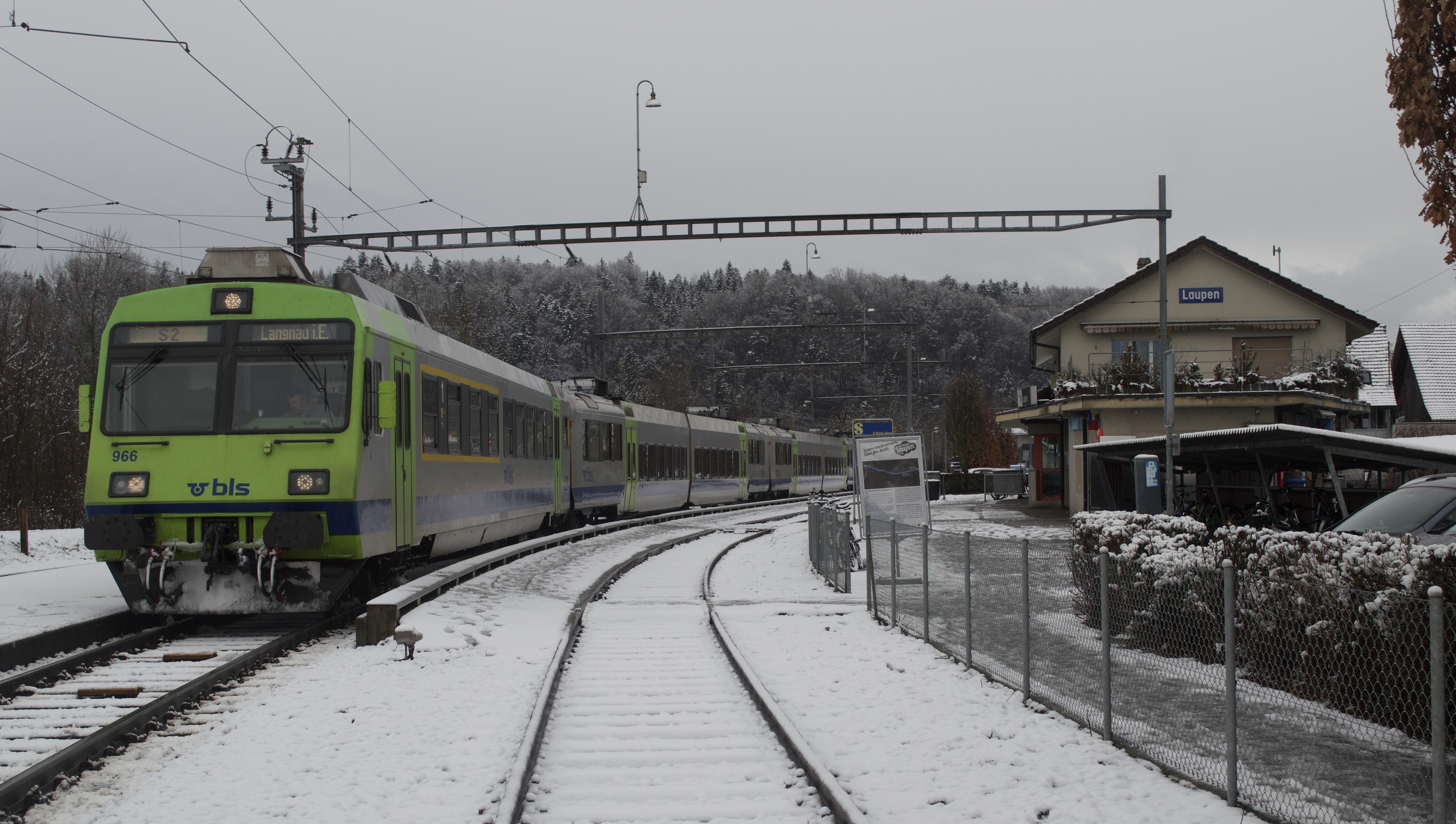
old station in winter (2019)

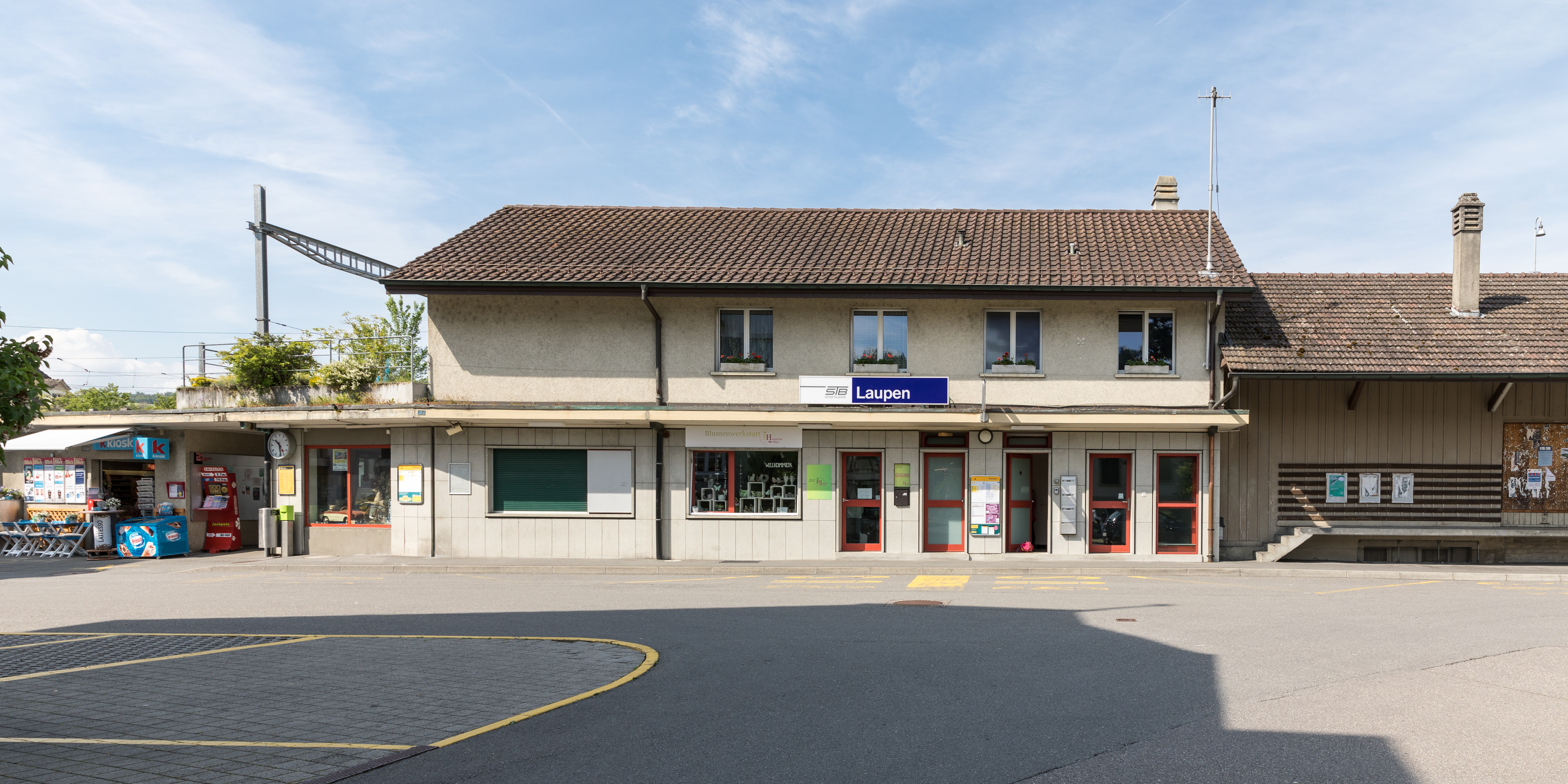
old station building in 2019

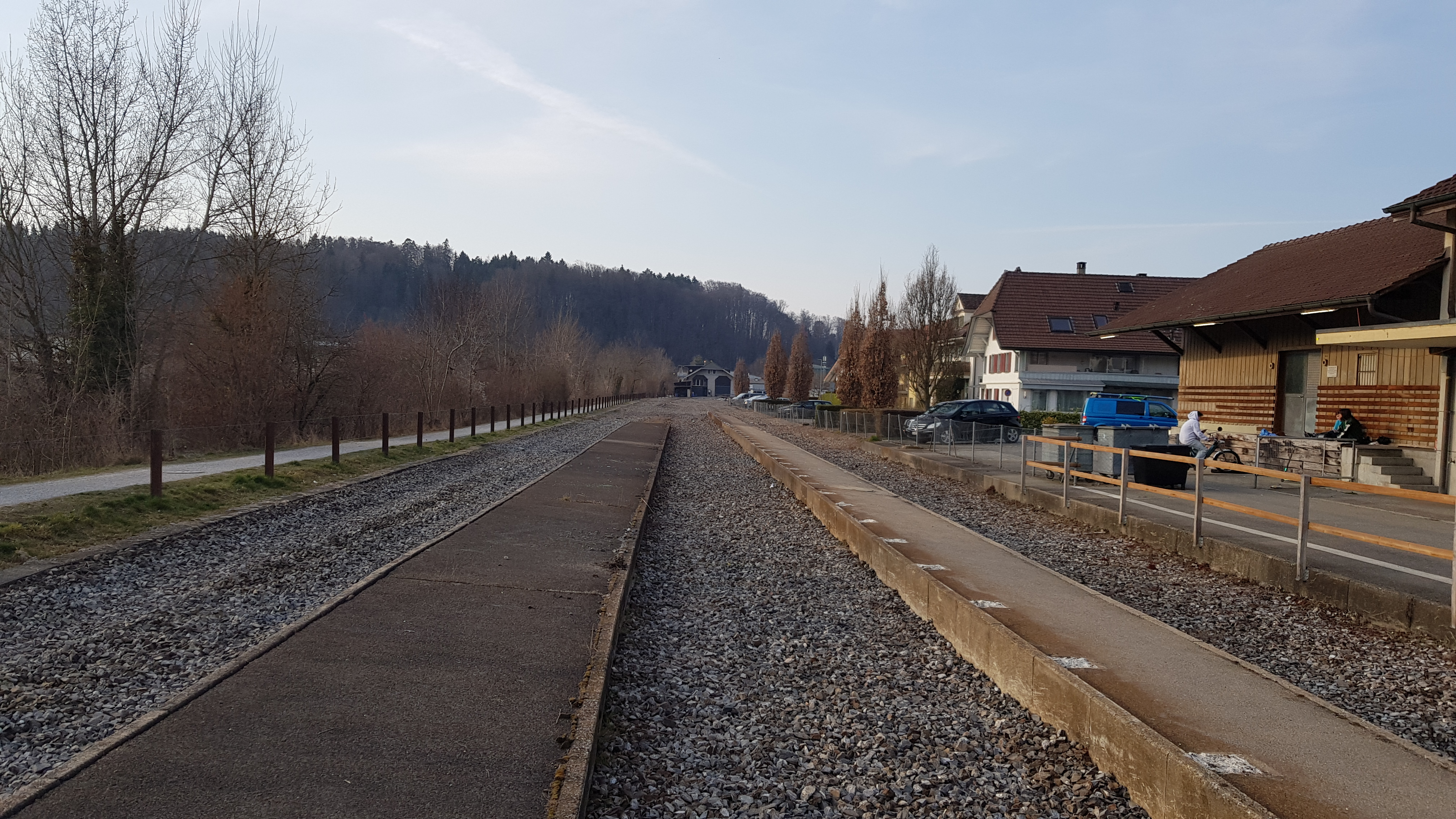
trackless old station in 2022
