= Langnau i.E. railway station =

Railway station in Langnau im Emmental, Switzerland

Langnau i.E.
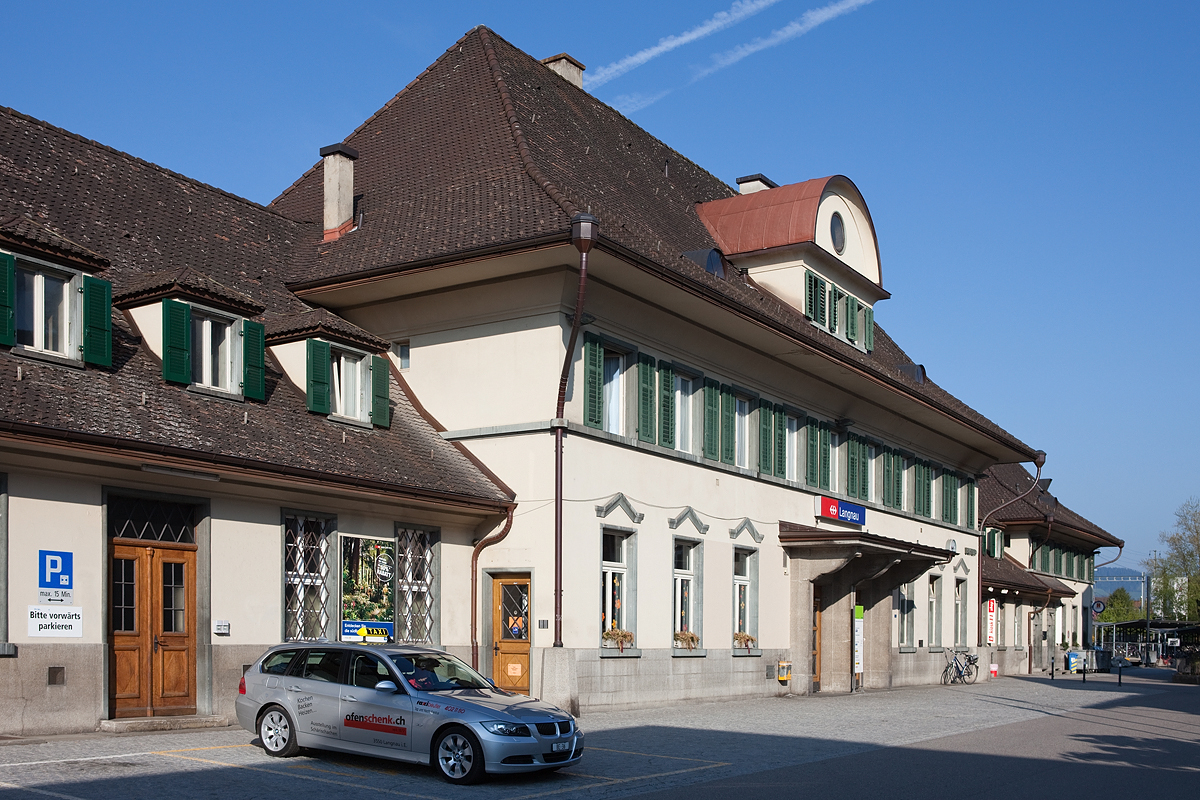
- The station building in 2009

General information
- Location: Langnau im Emmental; Switzerland
- Coordinates: 46°56′N 7°47′E
- Elevation: 673 m (2,208 ft)
- Owner: Swiss Federal Railways
- Lines: Bern–Lucerne line; Solothurn–Langnau line
- Platforms: 3: 1 side platform; 1 island platform
- Tracks: 3 (used for passenger operations)
- Train operators: BLS AG
- Connections: Busland AG buses

Construction
- Parking: Yes
- Cycle facilities: Yes (290 spaces)
- Accessible: Yes

Other information
- Station code: 8508207 (LN)
- Fare zone: 140 (Libero)

Passengers
- 2023: 4'800 per weekday (BLS)

Services
Preceding station	Bern S-Bahn	Following station
Emmenmatt towards Laupen BE	S2	Terminus
Signau towards Bern	S22 Rush-hour service	Terminus
Signau One-way operation	S22 Rush-hour service	Terminus
Neumühle towards Thun	S4	Terminus
Preceding station	Lucerne S-Bahn	Following station
Terminus	S6	Trubschachen towards Lucerne
Preceding station	BLS	Following station
Konolfingen towards Bern	RE7	Trubschachen towards Lucerne
Location

Langnau i.E. railway station (German: Bahnhof Langnau i.E.), also known as Langnau im Emmental railway station, is a railway station in the municipality of Langnau im Emmental, in the Swiss canton of Bern. It is located at the junction of the standard gauge Bern–Lucerne line of Swiss Federal Railways and the Solothurn–Langnau line of BLS AG.

== Services ==
As of the December 2024 timetable change, the following services stop at Langnau i.E.:

- RegioExpress: hourly service between Bern and Lucerne.
- Bern S-Bahn:
  - S2: half-hourly service to Laupen BE.
  - S22: daily morning rush-hour service on weekdays to Bern.
  - S4: hourly service to Thun.
- Lucerne S-Bahn:
  - S6: hourly service to Lucerne.
