= Uetendorf railway station =

Railway station in Uetendorf, Switzerland

Uetendorf
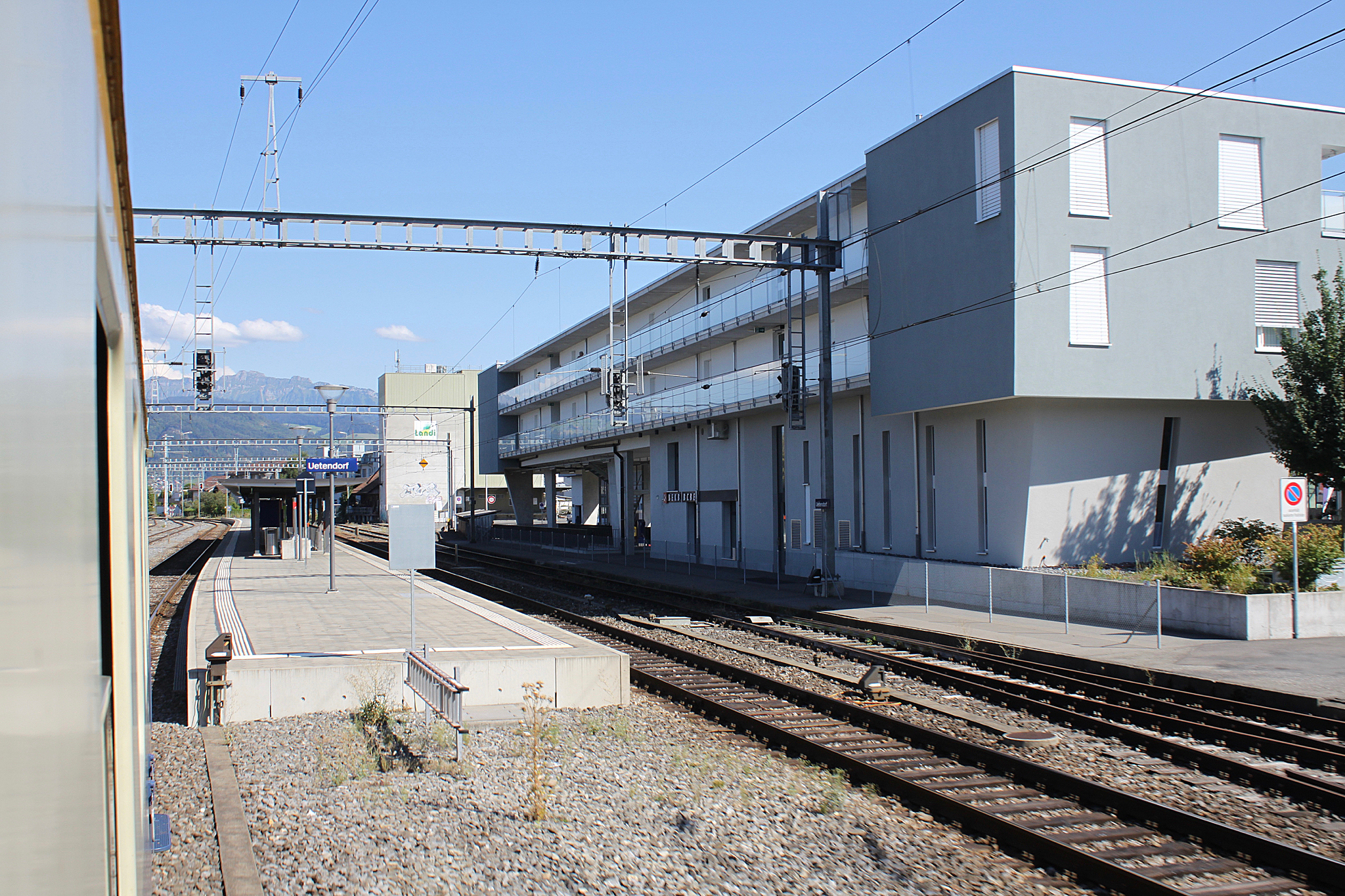
- The station building in 2018

General information
- Location: Bahnhofstrasse; Uetendorf; Switzerland
- Coordinates: 46°46′30″N 7°34′23″E
- Elevation: 554 m (1,818 ft)
- Owner: BLS AG
- Line: Gürbetal line
- Distance: 29.3 km (18.2 mi) from Bern
- Platforms: 2 (1 island platform)
- Tracks: 2
- Train operators: BLS AG
- Connections: PostAuto AG buses

Construction
- Parking: Yes (10 spaces)
- Accessible: Yes

Other information
- Station code: 8507070 (UE)
- Fare zone: 701 (Libero)

Passengers
- 2023: 1'300 per weekday (BLS)

Services
Preceding station	Bern S-Bahn	Following station
Seftigen towards Langnau i.E.	S4	Uetendorf Allmend towards Thun
Seftigen towards Solothurn or Sumiswald-Grünen	S44	Uetendorf Allmend towards Thun
Location

Uetendorf railway station (German: Bahnhof Uetendorf) is a railway station in the municipality of Uetendorf, in the Swiss canton of Bern. It is an intermediate stop on the standard gauge Gürbetal line of BLS AG.

== Services ==
As of the December 2024 timetable change, the following services stop at Uetendorf:

- Bern S-Bahn S4/S44: half-hourly service between Thun and Burgdorf and hourly service from Burgdorf to Langnau i.E., Solothurn, or Sumiswald-Grünen.
