= Uetendorf Allmend railway station =

Railway station in Uetendorf, Switzerland

Uetendorf Allmend
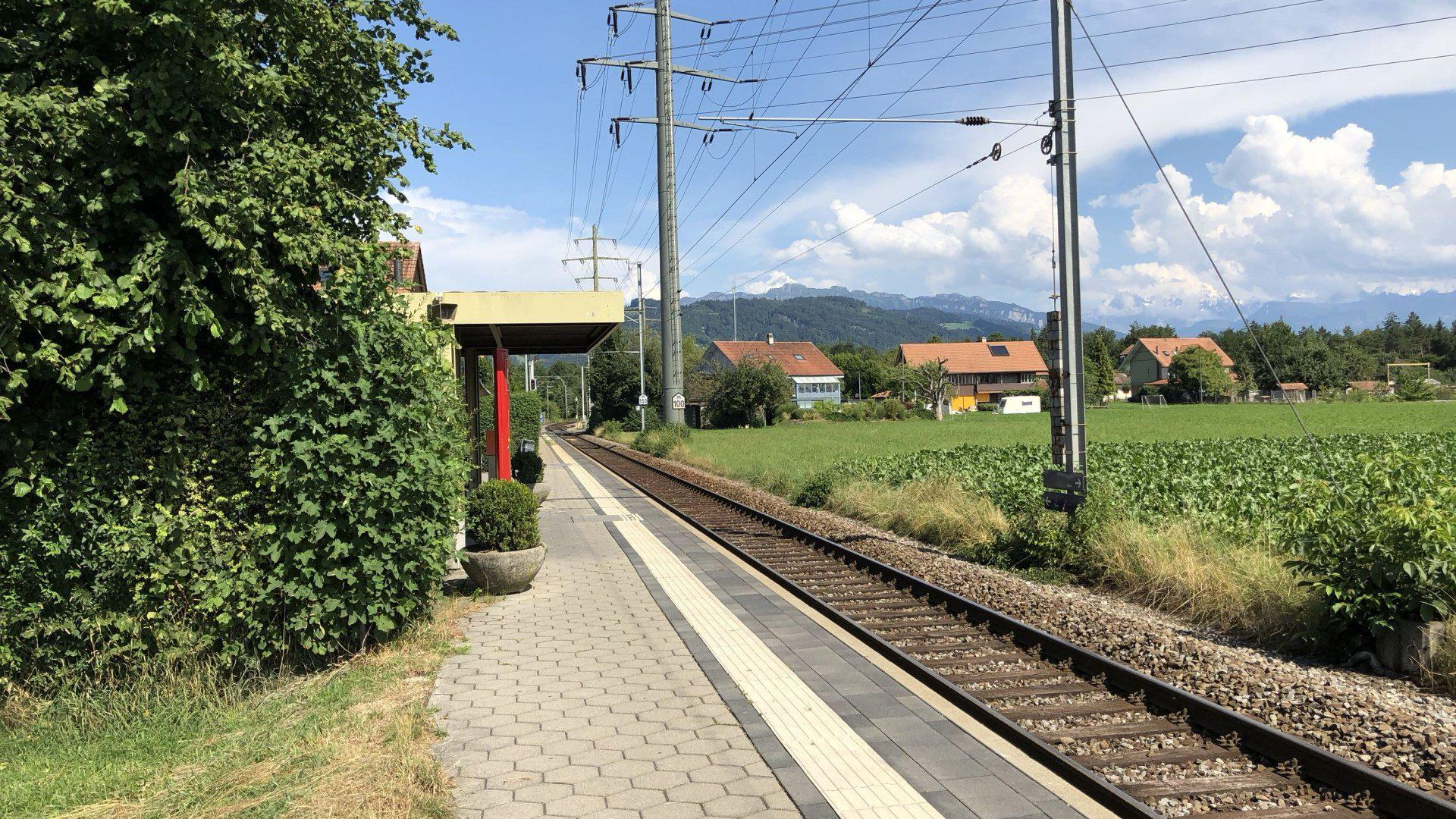
- The station platform in 2018, prior to the overhaul

General information
- Location: Uetendorf; Switzerland
- Coordinates: 46°46′23″N 7°35′42″E
- Elevation: 554 m (1,818 ft)
- Owner: BLS AG
- Line: Gürbetal line
- Distance: 31.0 km (19.3 mi) from Bern
- Platforms: 2 (1 island platform)
- Tracks: 2
- Train operators: BLS AG

Construction
- Accessible: Yes

Other information
- Station code: 8507094 (UEA)
- Fare zone: 701 (Libero)

History
- Rebuilt: 2019-2021

Passengers
- 2023: 490 per weekday (BLS)

Services
Preceding station	Bern S-Bahn	Following station
Uetendorf towards Langnau i.E.	S4	Thun Terminus
Uetendorf towards Solothurn or Sumiswald-Grünen	S44	Thun Terminus
Location

Uetendorf Allmend railway station (German: Bahnhof Uetendorf Allmend) is a railway station in the municipality of Uetendorf, in the Swiss canton of Bern. It is an intermediate stop on the standard gauge Gürbetal line of BLS AG.

== Services ==
As of the December 2024 timetable change, the following services stop at Uetendorf Allmend:

- Bern S-Bahn S4/S44: half-hourly service between Thun and Burgdorf and hourly service from Burgdorf to Langnau i.E., Solothurn, or Sumiswald-Grünen.
