= Burgistein railway station =

Railway station in Burgistein, Switzerland

Burgistein
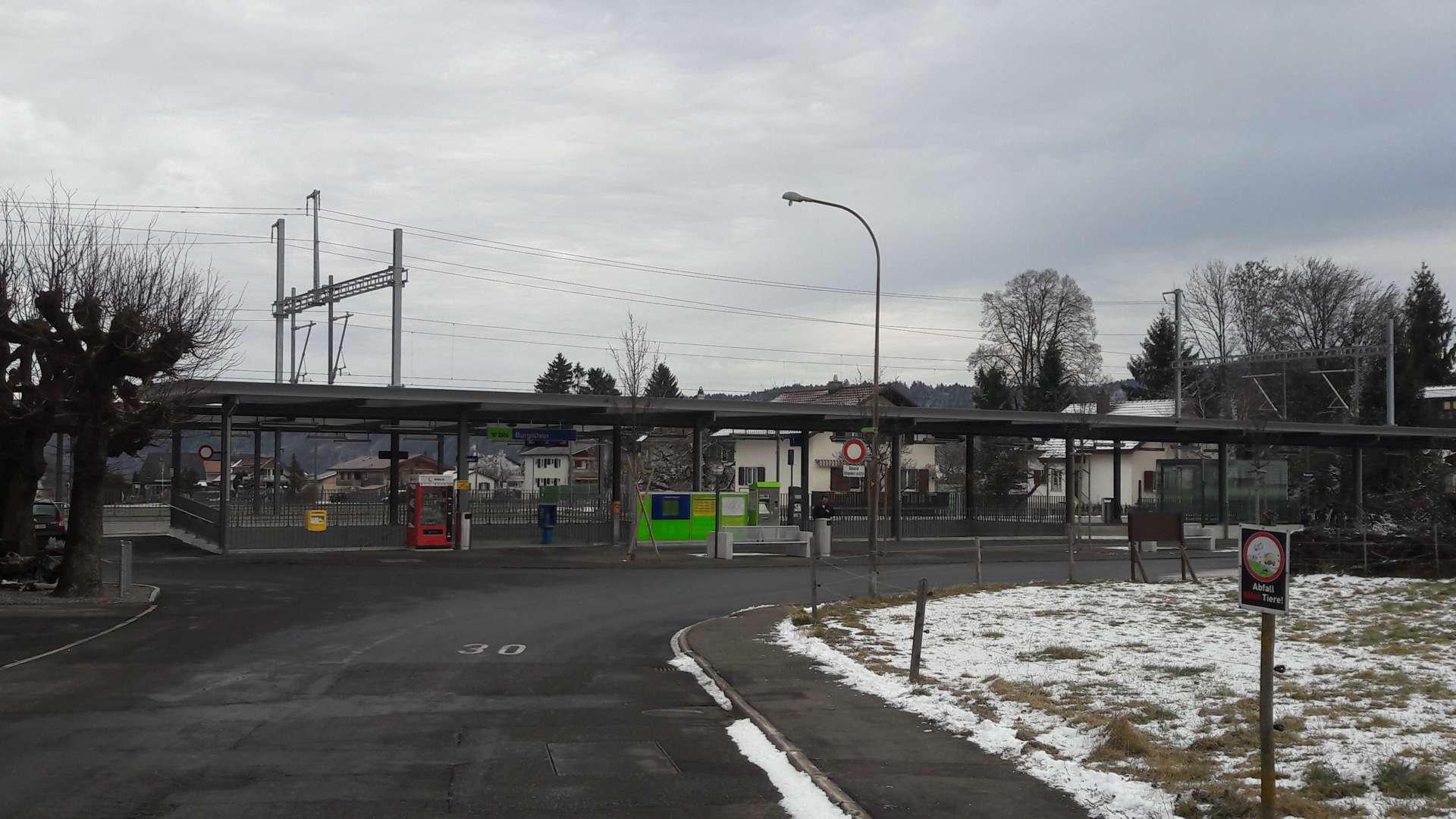
- The station platforms in 2018

General information
- Location: Burgistein; Switzerland
- Coordinates: 46°47′20″N 7°31′16″E
- Elevation: 567 m (1,860 ft)
- Owner: BLS AG
- Line: Gürbetal line
- Distance: 24.2 km (15.0 mi) from Bern
- Platforms: 2 side platforms
- Tracks: 2
- Train operators: BLS AG

Construction
- Parking: Yes (80 spaces)
- Accessible: Yes

Other information
- Station code: 8507072 (BWA)
- Fare zone: 710 (Libero)

History
- Former names: Burgistein-Wattenwil

Passengers
- 2023: 530 per weekday (BLS)

Services
Preceding station	Bern S-Bahn	Following station
Thurnen towards Langnau i.E.	S4	Seftigen towards Thun
Thurnen towards Solothurn or Sumiswald-Grünen	S44	Seftigen towards Thun
Location

Burgistein railway station (German: Bahnhof Burgistein) is a railway station in the municipality of Burgistein, in the Swiss canton of Bern. It is an intermediate stop on the standard gauge Gürbetal line of BLS AG.

== Services ==
As of the December 2024 timetable change, the following services stop at Burgistein:

- Bern S-Bahn S4/S44: half-hourly service between Thun and Burgdorf and hourly service from Burgdorf to Langnau i.E., Solothurn, or Sumiswald-Grünen.
