= Seftigen railway station =

Railway station in Seftigen, Switzerland

Seftigen
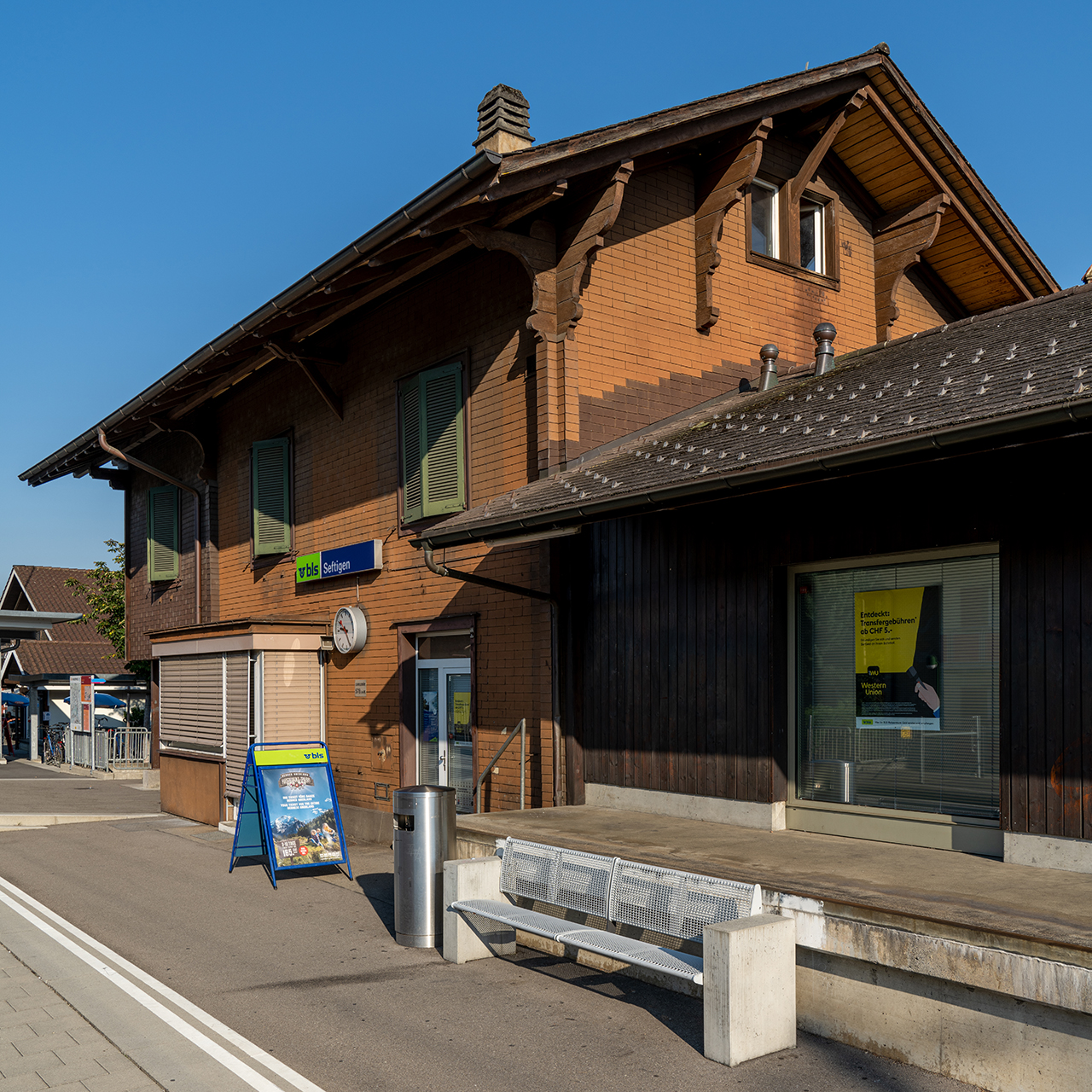
- The station building in 2020

General information
- Location: Seftigen; Switzerland
- Coordinates: 46°47′13″N 7°32′24″E
- Elevation: 578 m (1,896 ft)
- Owner: BLS AG
- Line: Gürbetal line
- Distance: 25.7 km (16.0 mi) from Bern
- Platforms: 1 side platform
- Tracks: 1
- Train operators: BLS AG
- Connections: STI Bus AG bus line

Construction
- Parking: Yes (5 spaces)
- Accessible: Yes

Other information
- Station code: 8507071 (SF)
- Fare zone: 710 (Libero

Passengers
- 2023: 1'200 per weekday (BLS)

Services
Preceding station	Bern S-Bahn	Following station
Burgistein towards Langnau i.E.	S4	Uetendorf towards Thun
Burgistein towards Solothurn or Sumiswald-Grünen	S44	Uetendorf towards Thun
Location

Seftigen railway station (German: Bahnhof Seftigen) is a railway station in the municipality of Seftigen, in the Swiss canton of Bern. It is an intermediate stop on the standard gauge Gürbetal line of BLS AG.

== Services ==
As of the December 2024 timetable change, the following services stop at Seftigen:

- Bern S-Bahn S4/S44: half-hourly service between Thun and Burgdorf and hourly service from Burgdorf to Langnau i.E., Solothurn, or Sumiswald-Grünen.
