= Kaufdorf railway station =

Railway station in Kaufdorf, Switzerland

Kaufdorf
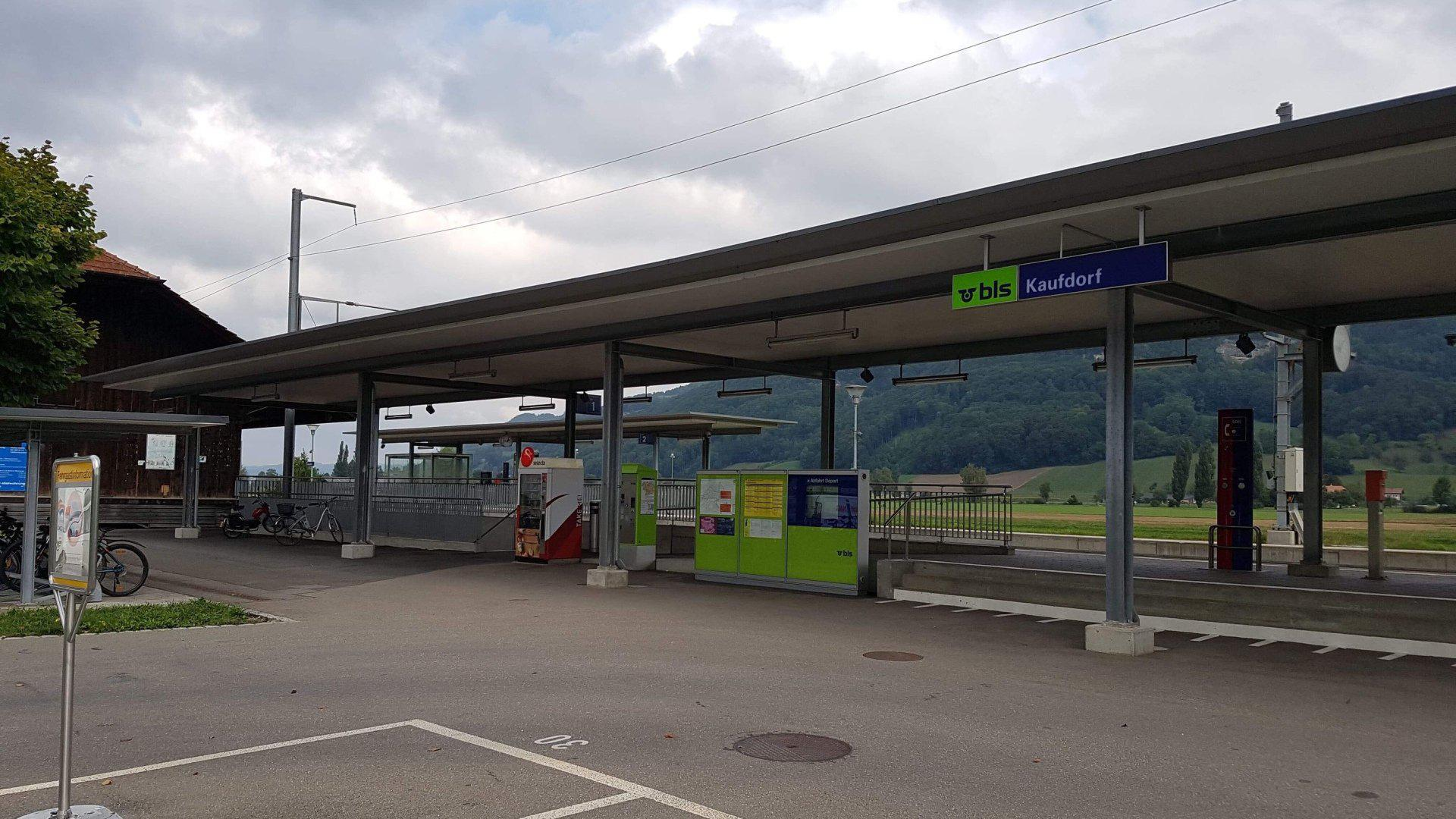
- The station platforms in 2018

General information
- Location: Kaufdorf; Switzerland
- Coordinates: 46°50′17″N 7°30′07″E
- Elevation: 535 m (1,755 ft)
- Owner: BLS AG
- Line: Gürbetal line
- Distance: 18.5 km (11.5 mi) from Bern
- Platforms: 2 side platforms
- Tracks: 2
- Train operators: BLS AG
- Connections: BERNMOBIL bus line

Construction
- Parking: Yes (16 spaces)
- Accessible: Yes

Other information
- Station code: 8507074 (KD)
- Fare zone: 126/626 (Libero)

Passengers
- 2023: 690 per weekday (BLS)

Services
Preceding station	Bern S-Bahn	Following station
Toffen towards Langnau i.E.	S4	Thurnen towards Thun
Toffen towards Solothurn or Sumiswald-Grünen	S44	Thurnen towards Thun
Location

Kaufdorf railway station (German: Bahnhof Kaufdorf) is a railway station in the municipality of Kaufdorf, in the Swiss canton of Bern. It is an intermediate stop on the standard gauge Gürbetal line of BLS AG.

== Services ==
As of the December 2024 timetable change, the following services stop at Kaufdorf:

- Bern S-Bahn S4/S44: half-hourly service between Thun and Burgdorf and hourly service from Burgdorf to Langnau i.E., Solothurn, or Sumiswald-Grünen.
