= Toffen railway station =

Railway station in Toffen, Switzerland

Toffen
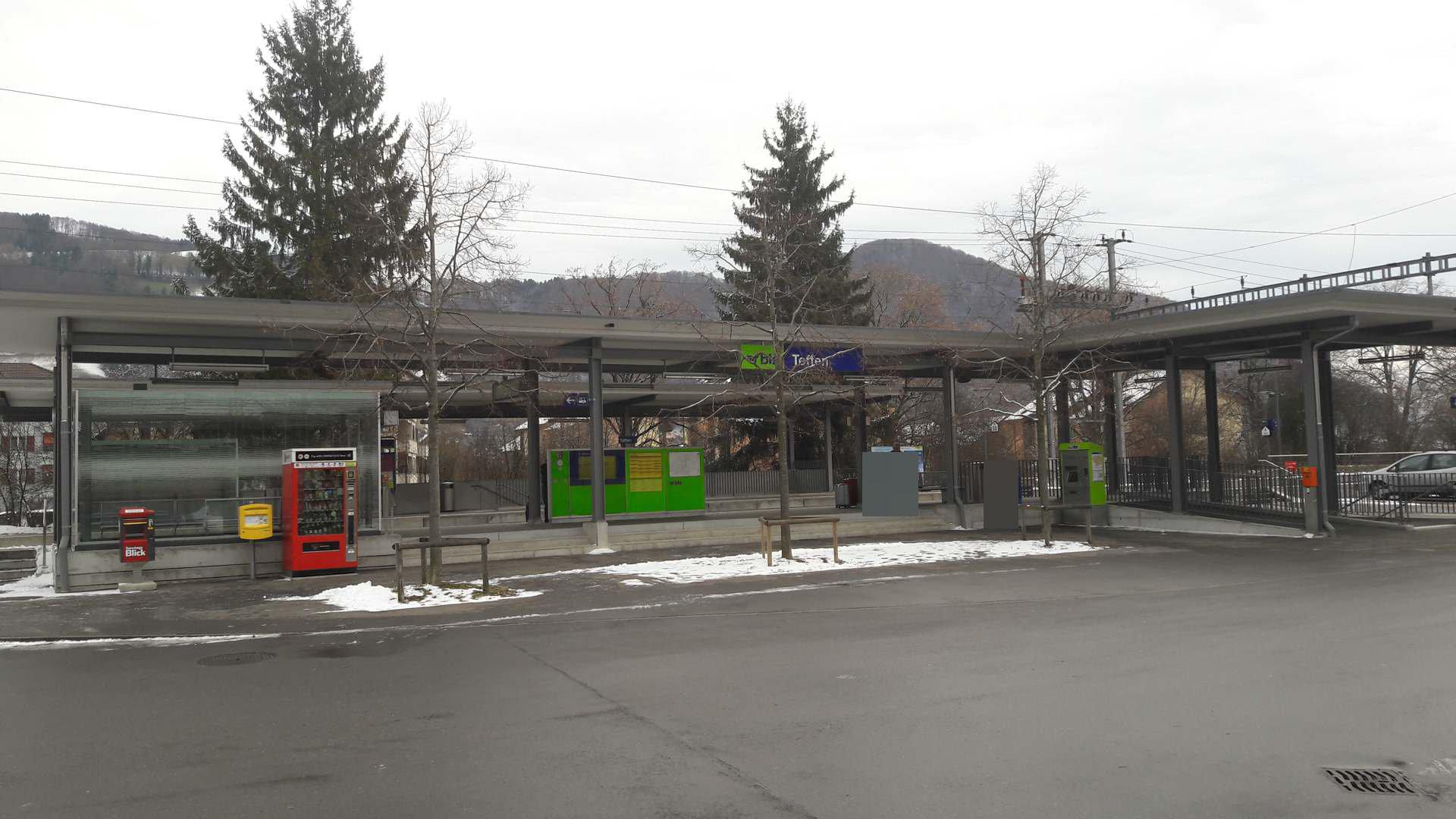
- The station platforms in 2018

General information
- Location: Toffen; Switzerland
- Coordinates: 46°52′N 7°30′E
- Elevation: 528 m (1,732 ft)
- Owner: BLS AG
- Line: Gürbetal line
- Distance: 16.3 km (10.1 mi) from Bern
- Platforms: 2 side platforms
- Tracks: 2
- Train operators: BLS AG
- Connections: PostAuto AG bus line

Construction
- Parking: Yes (9 spaces)
- Accessible: Yes

Other information
- Station code: 8507075 (TO)
- Fare zone: 126 (Libero)

Passengers
- 2023: 1'400 per weekday (BLS)

Services
Preceding station	Bern S-Bahn	Following station
Belp towards Langnau i.E.	S4	Kaufdorf towards Thun
Belp towards Solothurn or Sumiswald-Grünen	S44	Kaufdorf towards Thun
Location

Toffen railway station (German: Bahnhof Toffen) is a railway station in the municipality of Toffen, in the Swiss canton of Bern. It is an intermediate stop on the standard gauge Gürbetal line of BLS AG.

== Services ==
As of the December 2024 timetable change, the following services stop at Toffen:

- Bern S-Bahn S4/S44: half-hourly service between Thun and Burgdorf and hourly service from Burgdorf to Langnau i.E., Solothurn, or Sumiswald-Grünen.
