= Thurnen railway station =

Railway station in Mühlethurnen, Switzerland

Thurnen
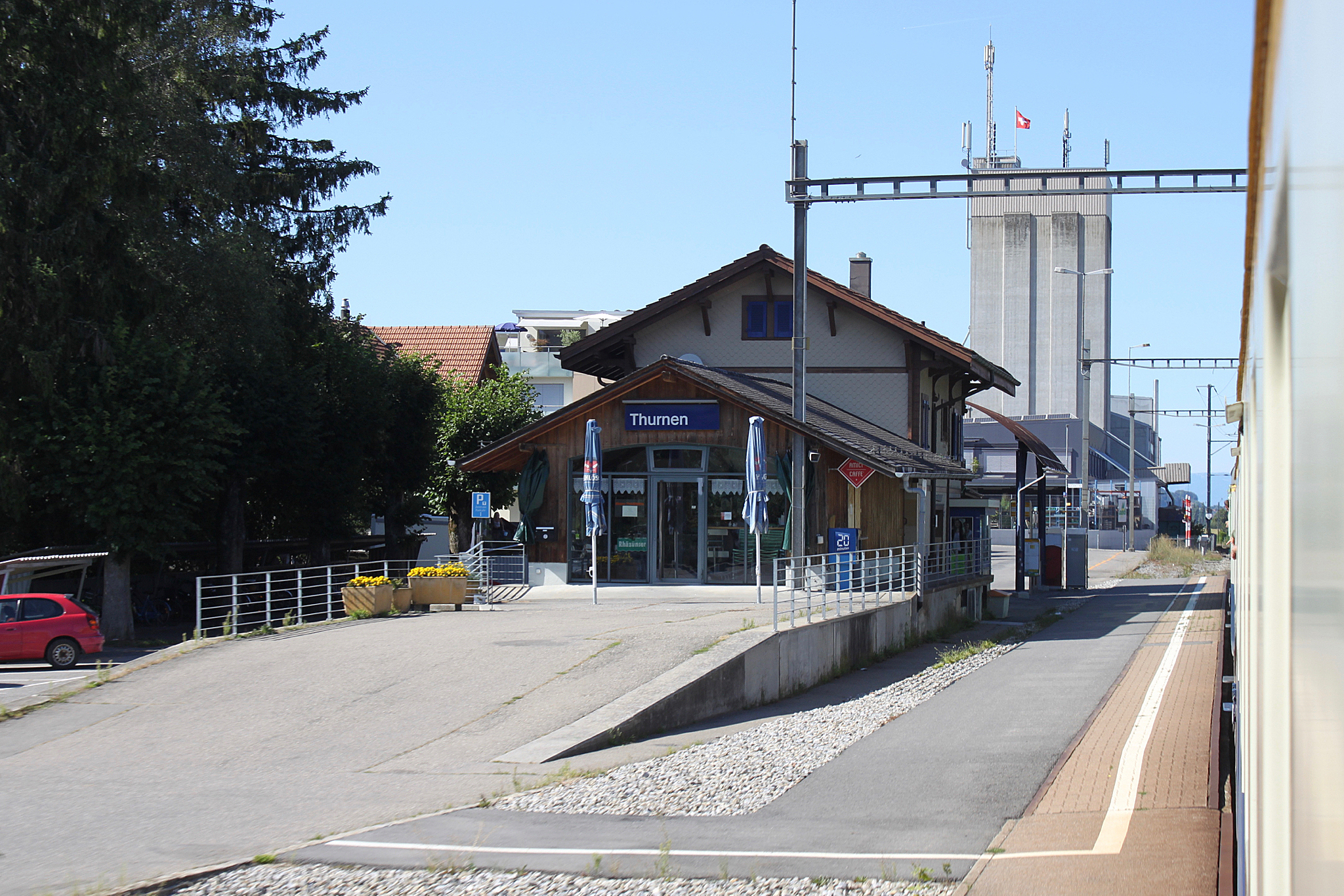
- The station building in 2018

General information
- Location: Mühlethurnen; Switzerland
- Coordinates: 46°48′50″N 7°30′50″E
- Elevation: 550 m (1,800 ft)
- Owner: BLS AG
- Line: Gürbetal line
- Distance: 21.3 km (13.2 mi) from Bern
- Platforms: 1 side platform
- Tracks: 1
- Train operators: BLS AG
- Connections: PostAuto AG buses

Construction
- Parking: Yes (32 spaces)
- Accessible: No

Other information
- Station code: 8507073 (THU)
- Fare zone: 626 (Libero)

Passengers
- 2023: 1'100 per weekday (BLS)

Services
Preceding station	Bern S-Bahn	Following station
Kaufdorf towards Langnau i.E.	S4	Burgistein towards Thun
Kaufdorf towards Solothurn or Sumiswald-Grünen	S44	Burgistein towards Thun
Location

Thurnen railway station (German: Bahnhof Thurnen) is a railway station in the municipality of Mühlethurnen, in the Swiss canton of Bern. It is an intermediate stop on the standard gauge Gürbetal line of BLS AG.

== Services ==
As of the December 2024 timetable change, the following services stop at Thurnen:

- Bern S-Bahn S4/S44: half-hourly service between Thun and Burgdorf and hourly service from Burgdorf to Langnau i.E., Solothurn, or Sumiswald-Grünen.
