= Belp Steinbach railway station =

Railway station in Belp, Switzerland

Belp Steinbach
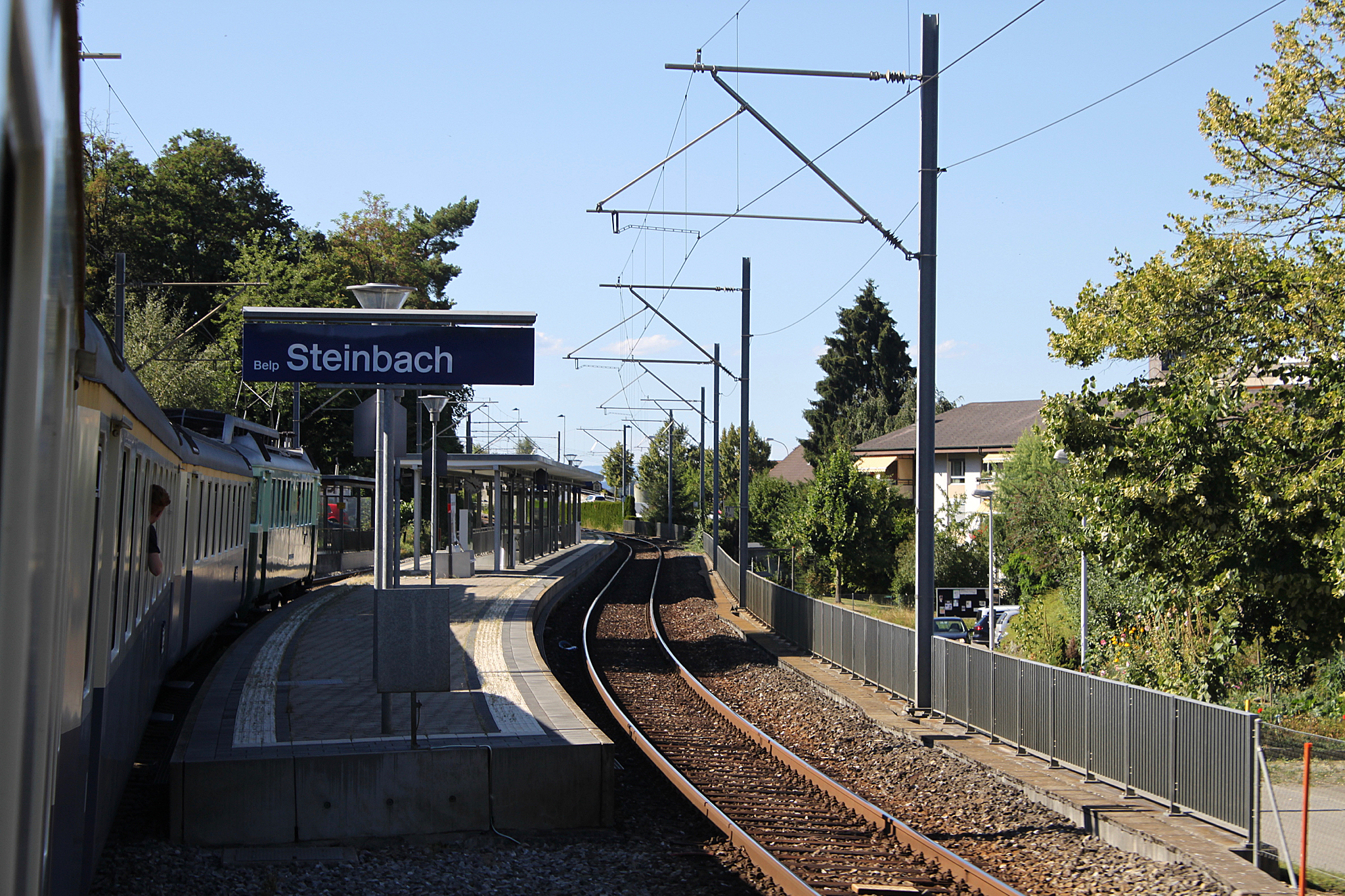
- A train arrives at the station in 2018

General information
- Location: Belp; Switzerland
- Coordinates: 46°53′42″N 7°29′35″E
- Elevation: 525 m (1,722 ft)
- Owner: BLS AG
- Line: Gürbetal line
- Distance: 11.9 km (7.4 mi) from Bern
- Platforms: 2 (1 island platform)
- Tracks: 2
- Train operators: BLS AG

Construction
- Parking: Yes
- Accessible: Yes

Other information
- Station code: 8507092 (BPST)
- Fare zone: 115 (Libero)

Passengers
- 2023: 1'400 per weekday (BLS)

Services
Preceding station	Bern S-Bahn	Following station
Kehrsatz towards Biel/Bienne	S3	Belp Terminus
Kehrsatz towards Münchenbuchsee or Biel/Bienne	S31	Belp Terminus
Location

Belp Steinbach railway station (German: Bahnhof Belp Steinbach) is a railway station in the municipality of Belp, in the Swiss canton of Bern. It is an intermediate stop on the standard gauge Gürbetal line of BLS AG.

== Services ==
As of the December 2024 timetable change, the following services stop at Belp Steinbach:

- Bern S-Bahn:
  - S3: half-hourly service between Biel/Bienne and Belp.
  - S31: rush-hour service between Münchenbuchsee or Biel/Bienne and Belp.
