= Lützelflüh-Goldbach railway station =

Railway station in Lützelflüh, Switzerland

Lützelflüh-Goldbach
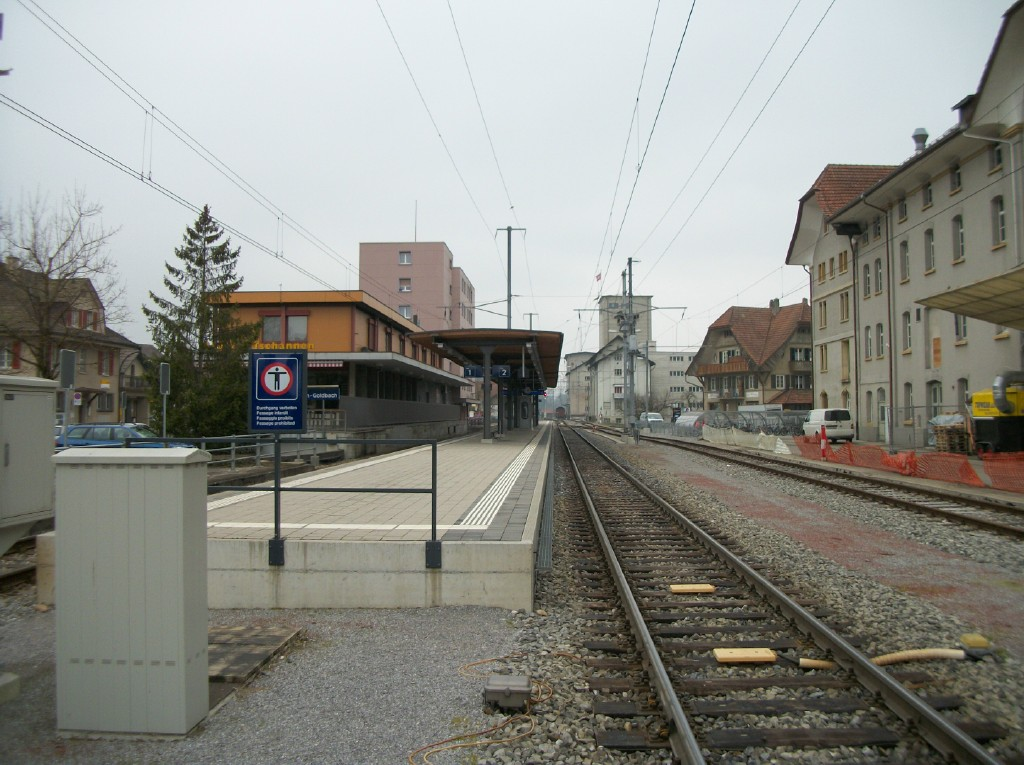
- The station platform in 2010, looking to the west

General information
- Location: Lützelflüh; Switzerland
- Coordinates: 47°00′N 7°41′E
- Elevation: 582 m (1,909 ft)
- Owner: BLS AG
- Line: Solothurn–Langnau line
- Distance: 30.1 km (18.7 mi) from Solothurn
- Platforms: 2 (1 island platform)
- Tracks: 3
- Train operators: BLS AG
- Connections: PostAuto AG bus line; Bürgerbus Rüderswil bus line

Construction
- Parking: Yes (16 spaces)
- Accessible: Yes

Other information
- Station code: 8508266 (LUGO)
- Fare zone: 154/156 (Libero)

Passengers
- 2023: 1'100 per weekday (BLS)

Services
| Preceding station | Bern S-Bahn | Following station |
|---|---|---|
| Hasle-Rüegsau towards Thun | S4 | Ramsei towards Langnau i.E. |
| Hasle-Rüegsau towards Thun | S44 | Ramsei towards Sumiswald-Grünen |
Location

Lützelflüh-Goldbach railway station (German: Bahnhof Lützelflüh-Goldbach) is a railway station in the municipality of Lützelflüh, in the Swiss canton of Bern. It is an intermediate stop on the standard gauge Solothurn–Langnau line of BLS AG.

== Services ==
As of the December 2024 timetable change, the following services stop at Lützelflüh-Goldbach:

- Bern S-Bahn S4/S44: half-hourly service to Thun and hourly service to Langnau i.E. or Sumiswald-Grünen.
