= Kehrsatz railway station =

Railway station in Kehrsatz, Switzerland

Kehrsatz
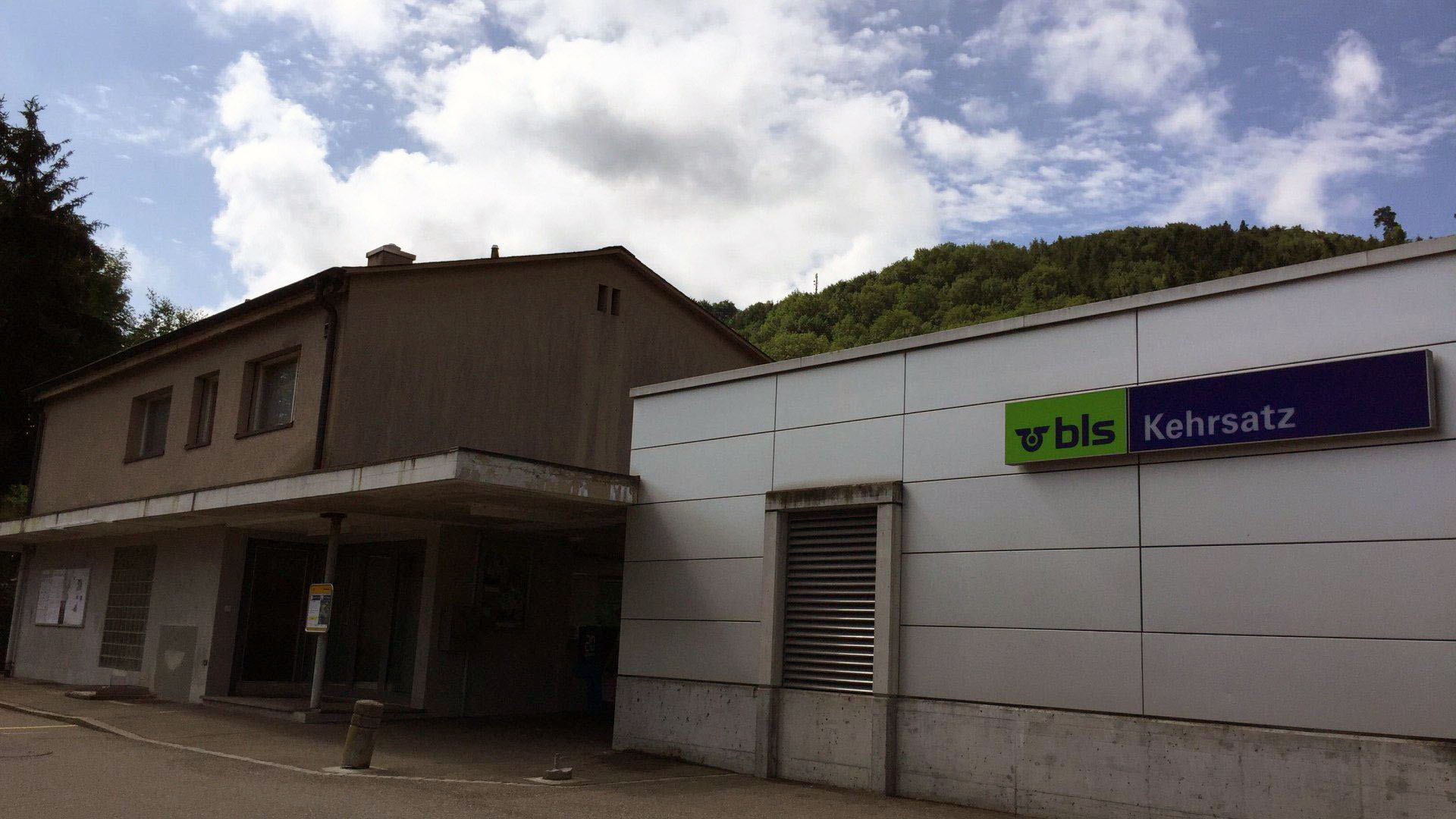
- The station building in 2018

General information
- Location: Kehrsatz; Switzerland
- Coordinates: 46°54′32″N 7°28′19″E
- Elevation: 570 m (1,870 ft)
- Owner: BLS AG
- Line: Gürbetal line
- Distance: 9.7 km (6.0 mi) from Bern
- Platforms: 2 side platforms
- Tracks: 2
- Train operators: BLS AG
- Connections: PostAuto AG bus line

Construction
- Parking: Yes (21 spaces)
- Accessible: Yes

Other information
- Station code: 8507077 (KS)
- Fare zone: 101/115 (Libero)

Passengers
- 2023: 1'500 per weekday (BLS)

Services
| Preceding station | Bern S-Bahn | Following station |
|---|---|---|
| Kehrsatz Nord towards Biel/Bienne | S3 | Belp Steinbach towards Belp |
| Kehrsatz Nord towards Münchenbuchsee or Biel/Bienne | S31 | Belp Steinbach towards Belp |
Location

Kehrsatz railway station (German: Bahnhof Kehrsatz) is a railway station in the municipality of Kehrsatz, in the Swiss canton of Bern. It is an intermediate stop on the standard gauge Gürbetal line of BLS AG.

== Services ==
As of the December 2025 timetable change, the following services stop at Kehrsatz:

- Bern S-Bahn:
  - S3: half-hourly service between Biel/Bienne and Belp.
  - S31: rush-hour service between Münchenbuchsee or Biel/Bienne and Belp.
