= Kehrsatz Nord railway station =

Railway station in Kehrsatz, Switzerland

Kehrsatz Nord
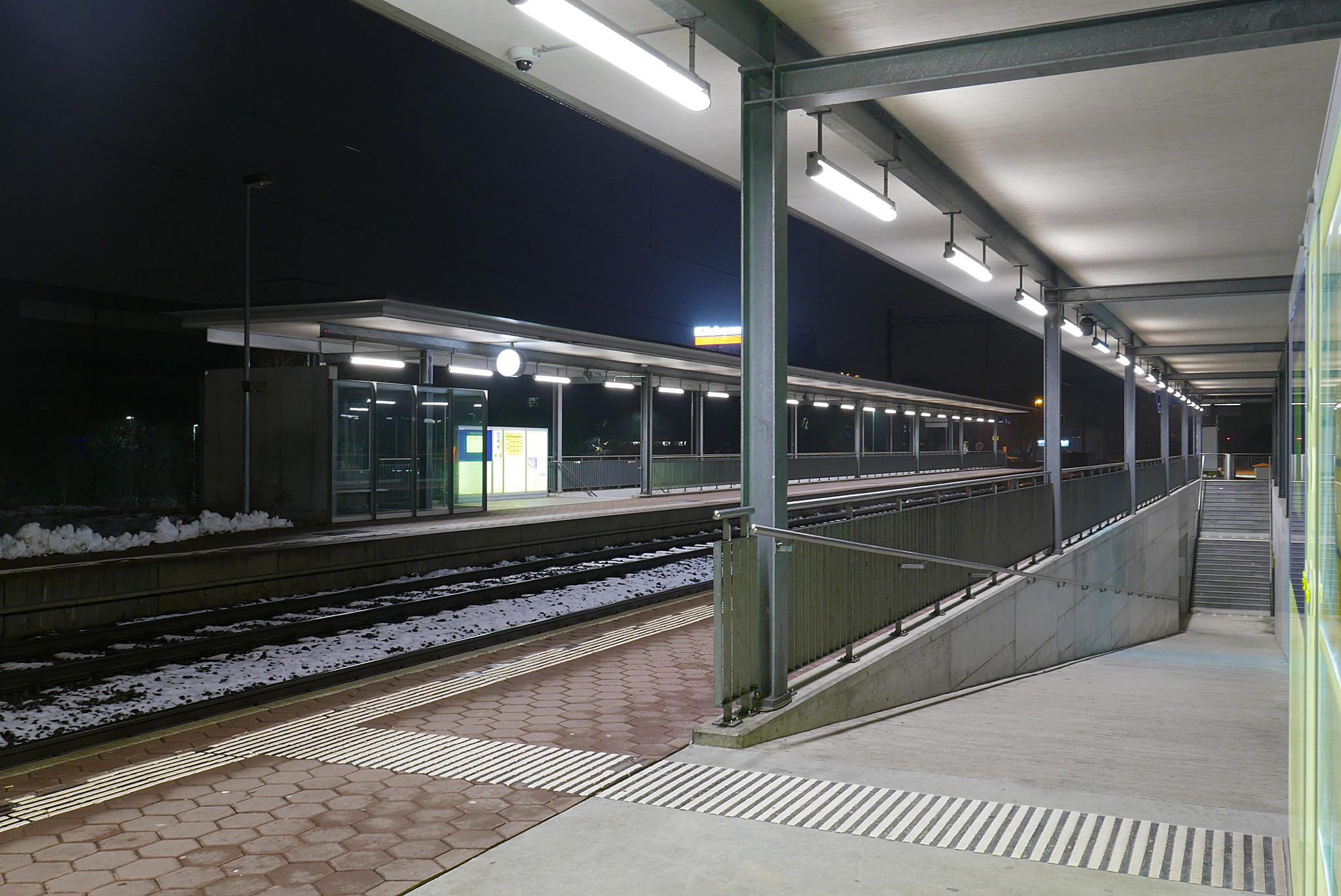
- The station platforms in 2017

General information
- Location: Kehrsatz; Switzerland
- Coordinates: 46°54′58″N 7°27′58″E
- Elevation: 567 m (1,860 ft)
- Owner: BLS AG
- Line: Gürbetal line
- Distance: 8.7 km (5.4 mi) from Bern
- Platforms: 2 side platforms
- Tracks: 2
- Train operators: BLS AG

Construction
- Accessible: Yes

Other information
- Station code: 8507093 (KSN)
- Fare zone: 101 (Libero)

Passengers
- 2023: 1'300 per weekday (BLS)

Services
Preceding station	Bern S-Bahn	Following station
Wabern bei Bern towards Biel/Bienne	S3	Kehrsatz towards Belp
Wabern bei Bern towards Münchenbuchsee or Biel/Bienne	S31	Kehrsatz towards Belp
Location

Kehrsatz Nord railway station (German: Bahnhof Kehrsatz Nord) is a railway station in the municipality of Kehrsatz, in the Swiss canton of Bern. It is an intermediate stop on the standard gauge Gürbetal line of BLS AG.

== Services ==
As of the December 2024 timetable change, the following services stop at Kehrsatz Nord:

- Bern S-Bahn:
  - S3: half-hourly service between Biel/Bienne and Belp.
  - S31: rush-hour service between Münchenbuchsee or Biel/Bienne and Belp.
