= Grünenmatt railway station =

Railway station in Lützelflüh, Switzerland

Grünenmatt
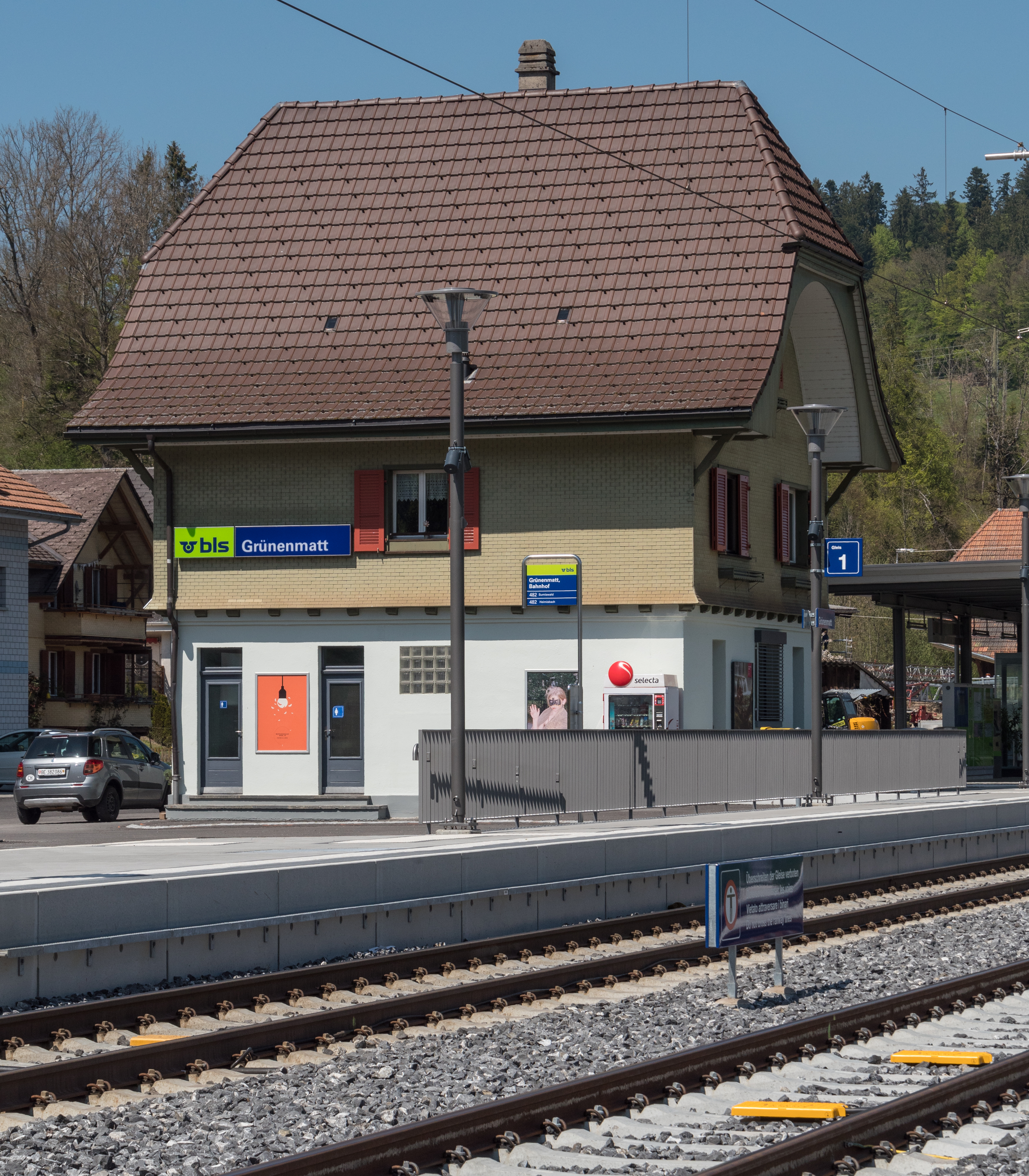
- The station building in 2019

General information
- Location: Bahnhofplatz; Lützelflüh; Switzerland
- Coordinates: 47°00′29″N 7°43′26″E
- Elevation: 624 m (2,047 ft)
- Owner: BLS AG
- Line: Ramsei–Huttwil line
- Distance: 2.4 km (1.5 mi) from Ramsei
- Platforms: 1 side platform
- Tracks: 2
- Train operators: BLS AG
- Connections: Busland AG buses

Construction
- Parking: Yes (24 spaces)
- Accessible: Yes

Other information
- Station code: 8508271 (GRMA)
- Fare zone: 156 (Libero)

Passengers
- 2023: 210 per weekday (BLS)

Services
Preceding station	Bern S-Bahn	Following station
Ramsei towards Thun	S44	Sumiswald-Grünen Terminus
Ramsei Terminus	S45	Sumiswald-Grünen Terminus
Location

Grünenmatt railway station (German: Bahnhof Grünenmatt) is a railway station in the municipality of Lützelflüh, in the Swiss canton of Bern. It is an intermediate stop on the standard gauge Ramsei–Huttwil line of BLS AG.

== Services ==
As of the December 2024 timetable change, the following services stop at Grünenmatt:

- Bern S-Bahn S44 / S45: two trains per hour between Ramsei and Sumiswald-Grünen and hourly service from Ramsei to Thun.
