= Bern-Lötschberg-Simplon-Bahn =

Former Swiss railway company

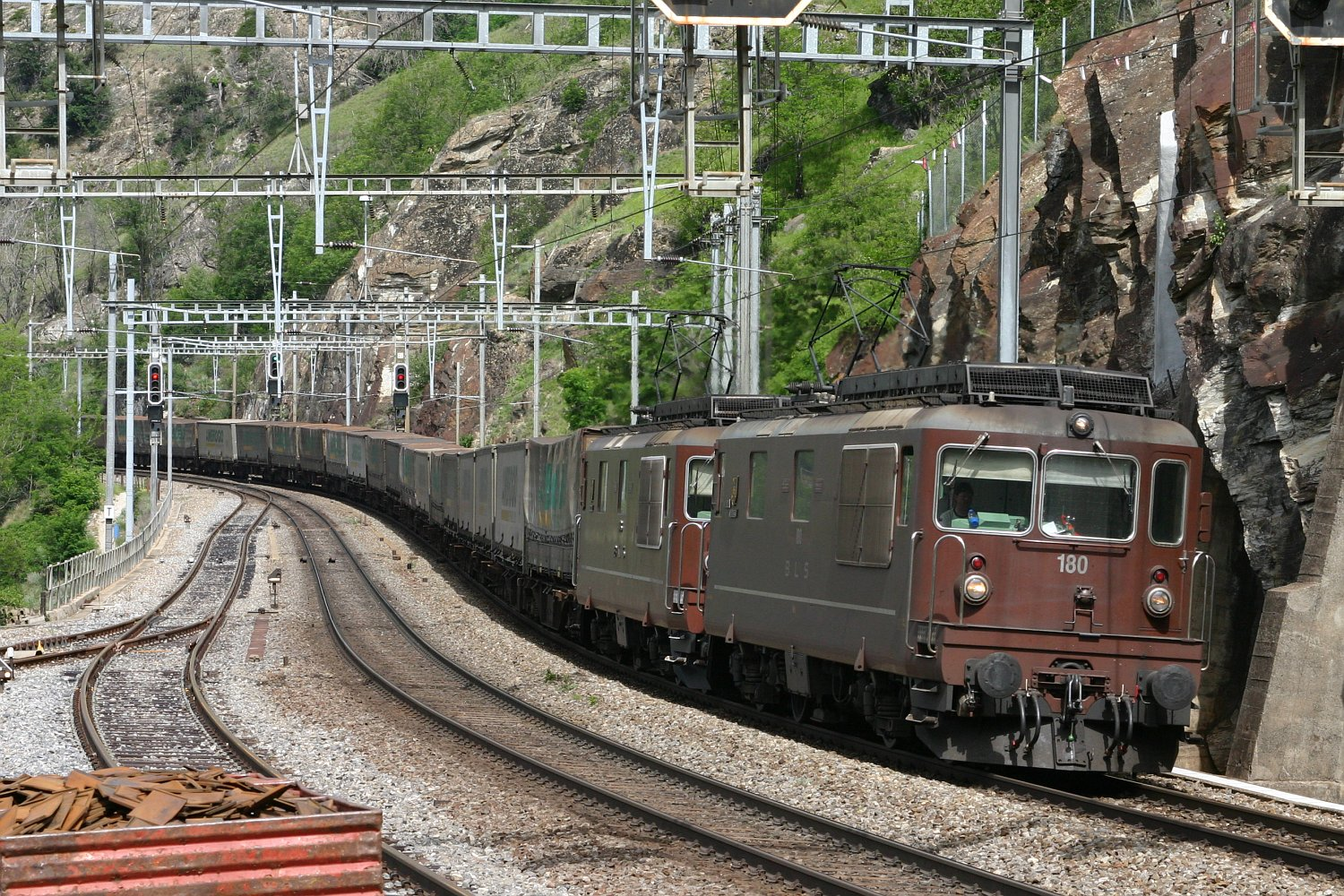
- BLS Re 4/4 class on the Lötschberg ramp

Overview
- Dates of operation: 1913–2006
- Predecessor: Lake Thun railway Bern–Neuchâtel railway Gürbetal–Bern–Schwarzenburg railway Spiez–Erlenbach-Zweisimmen railway
- Successor: BLS AG

Technical
- Track gauge: 1,435 mm (4 ft 8 1/2 in) standard gauge
- Electrification: 15 kV, 16 2/3 Hz, AC

The Bern-Lötschberg-Simplon-Bahn (BLS), known between 1997 and 2006 as the BLS Lötschbergbahn, was a Swiss railway company. In 2006 the company merged with Regionalverkehr Mittelland AG to form a new company called BLS AG.

BLS owned the largest standard gauge network on the Swiss Railway system apart from the Swiss Federal Railways. The railway had not been built at the time that the Federal government took control of the five big Swiss standard gauge railway companies in 1902 and so it led a separate existence, being considered the largest of the Swiss "private" railways, although the majority of its capital was owned by the cantonal government of Bern, with the Confederation holding about one fifth.

== History ==
=== Origins ===
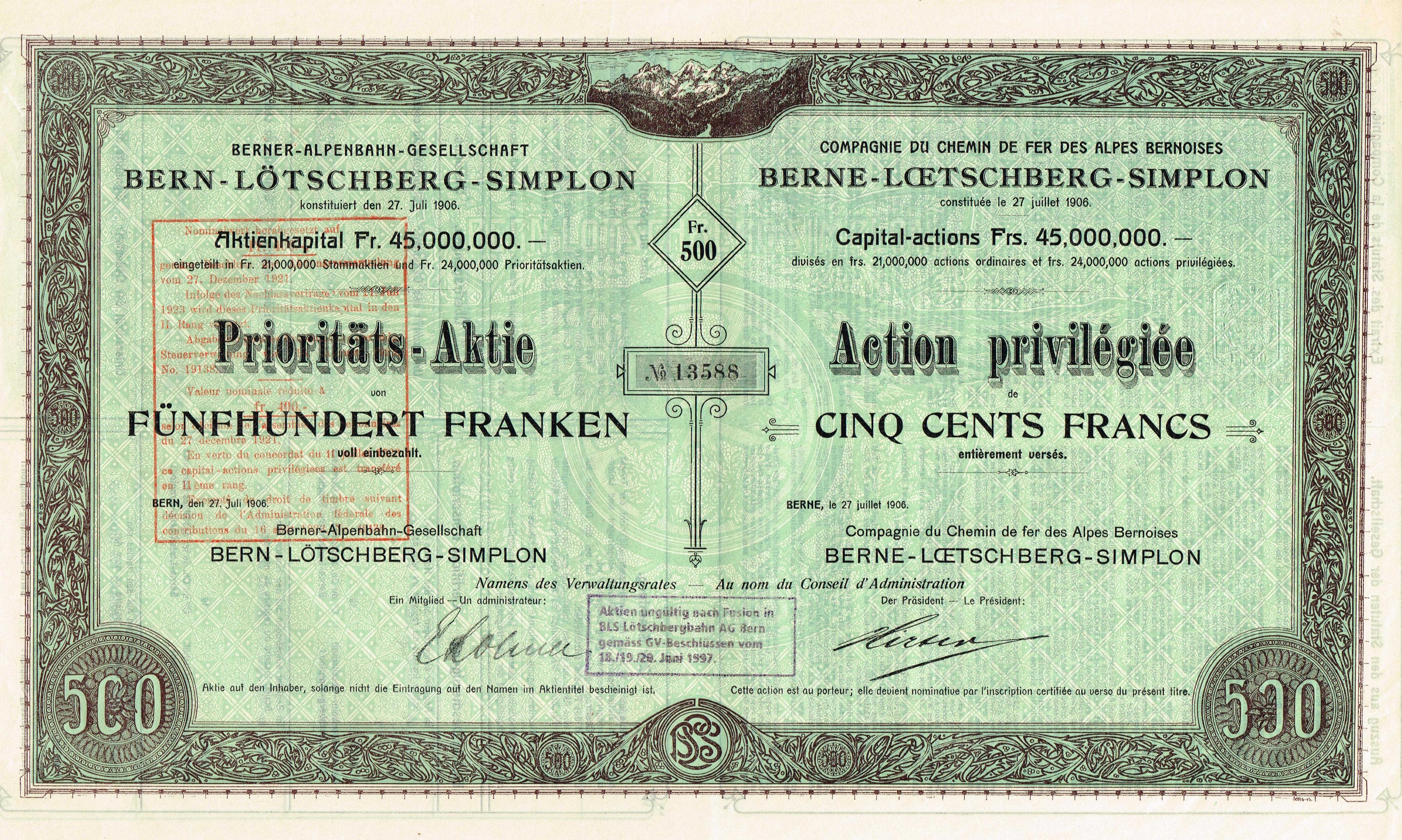
Share of the Bern-Lötschberg-Simplon-Bahn, issued 27 July 1906

With the opening of the Gotthard line in 1882 the canton of Bern became separated from the main north–south route. In 1871, due to the Franco-Prussian War, France had surrendered Alsace-Lorraine to Germany. As part of this annexation, the French-Swiss border crossing at Basel was lost.

The Bern-Lötschberg-Simplon-Bahn was founded on 27 July 1906 and within a few months construction work commenced.

=== The Lötschberg tunnel ===
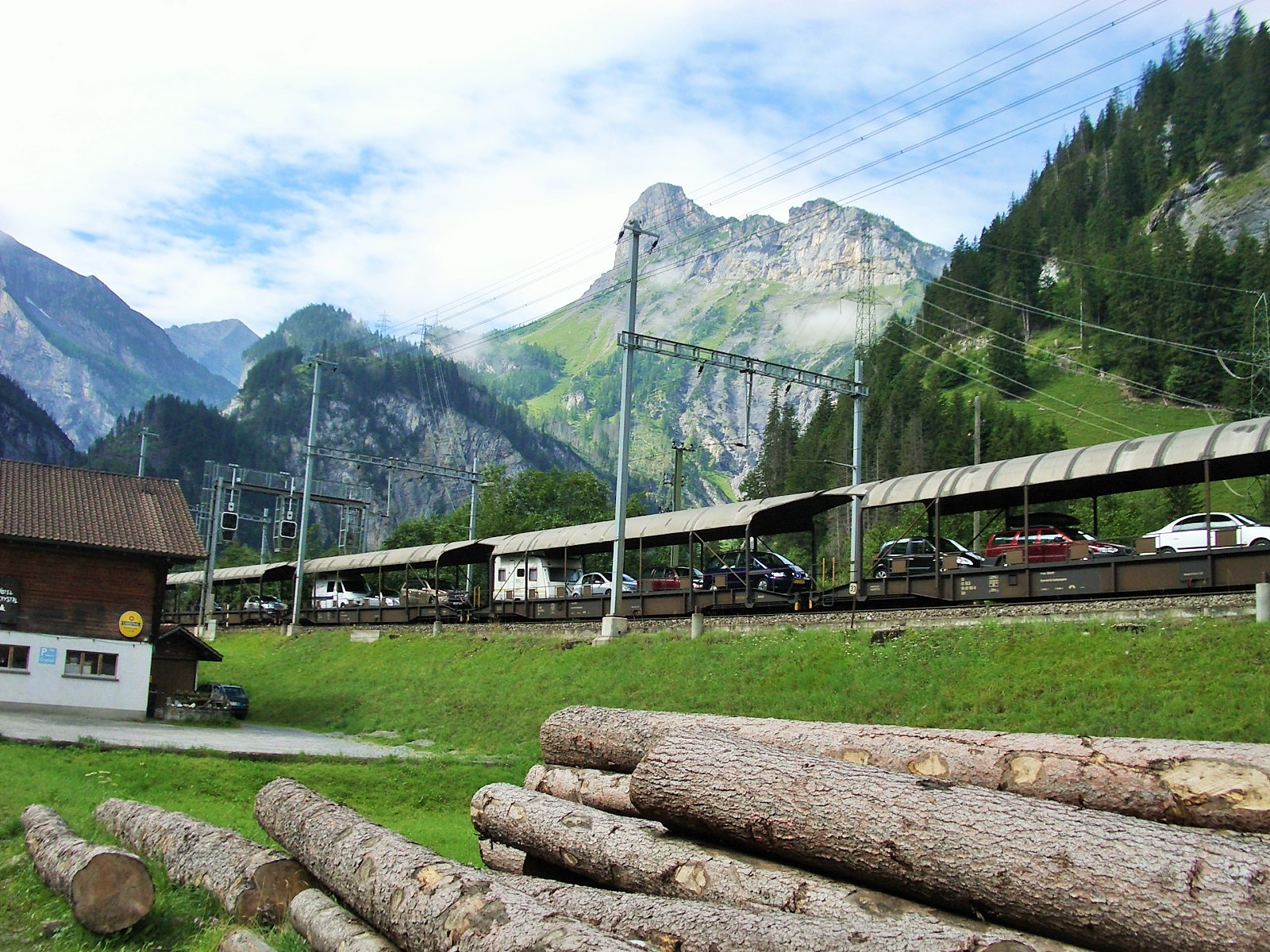
Car transport service (Kandersteg)

The construction of the "Mountain Route" the 58 km Frutigen–Brig line, was assigned to a French construction consortium, the major civil engineering work on the section being 13.7 km (8.5 mi) single-track Lötschberg Tunnel. Construction began on 15 October 1906 but within months the Swiss federal authorities ordered the BLS to enlarge the tunnel to double track and to profile its access ramps to suit. Money was not forthcoming for the provision of a double track line throughout and only the Lötschberg Tunnel itself was constructed in this way. Due to an accident on 24 July 1908 in which rock, washed with alpine waters, collapsed into the tunnel gallery killing 25 Italian miners, construction work was halted for six months before the gallery was sealed and plans made to bypass the site. The plan was to construct three curves inside the mountain and extending the length of the tunnel to 14.612 km (9.079 mi). The breakthrough was finally made on 31 March 1911. With the completion of the access ramps, the other civil engineering works on the line, 33 tunnels, 3 avalanche galleries and 22 bridges, together with the provision of electrical support masts, power stations, sub-stations, etc., the line, powered at 15,000 volts, alternating current, 16 2/3 Hz was officially opened on 19 June 1913.

=== Take overs and wartime changes ===
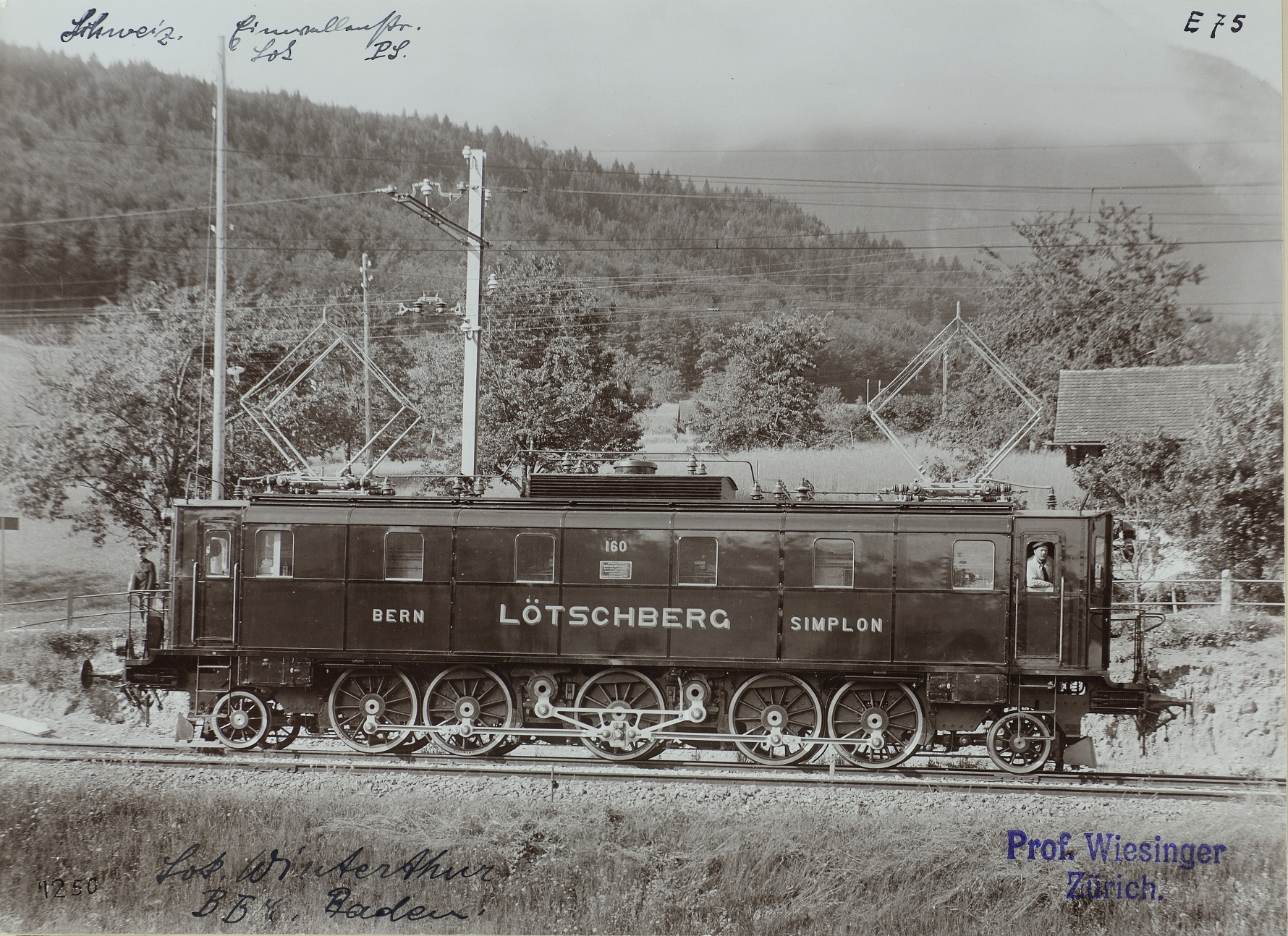
A Be 5/7 electrical locomotive developed for BLS, 1915.

In 1913 the BLS made a successful takeover of the Lake Thun railway (TSB) (Thun/Scherzligen–Interlaken–Bönigen), and became the operating company for three other companies in the area, the Bern–Neuchâtel railway (BN), the Gürbetal–Bern–Schwarzenburg railway (GBS) and the Spiez–Erlenbach-Zweisimmen railway (SEZ) adding some 130 km (80.8 mi) to its system. The BLS/TSB merger meant that the Lötschbergbahn also became the proprietor of the shipping company on Lake Thun and Lake Brienz.

In 1915, to shorten the distance through the Jura Mountains, to the French border, the company inaugurated the Grenchenberg line between Moutier and Lengnau, which included the 8.5 km (5.3 mi) Grenchenberg Tunnel.

Following World War I, in 1919, Alsace-Lorraine was returned to France under the Treaty of Versailles, and Basel was restored as a border crossing between France and Switzerland. As a consequence, the importance of Delle as a border crossing point into France became less. Transit traffic was more and more routed via Basel/Saint-Louis. Freight traffic between Germany and Italy, which could be routed via the Lötschberg line meant that the company was able to offset the loss of transit via Delle.

In the summer of 1926, the new 4500 HP locomotive was built with technology from the SAAS = Société Anonyme des Ateliers de Sécheron, Geneva.

=== Double-track and piggyback ===
Problems with the operation of a single line railway were being seriously felt in the 1960s, but it was not until 1976 that the Federal Council gave their approval to loan of CHF 620,000,000 to upgrade the line to double track, the work to be carried in several stages, commencing the following year. The line, entirely double-track, was officially inaugurated on 8 May 1992.

At the end of 1993, the Swiss Confederation commissioned the BLS to provide a "piggyback" corridor along its line for road vehicles with a width of 2.5 m (98.4 in) and a corner height of 4 m (13 ft 1.5 in). The construction work began in January 1994 and the opening was delayed, due to geological problems on the southern side of the Simplon, until 11 June 2001. Since opening, the "rolling highway", the transportation of trucks by rail from Germany to Italy via Lötschberg, has made a considerable contribution towards transferring transit traffic from road to rail.

In 1994 the BLS moved 9.2 million passengers.

=== Politics and railways ===
On 1 January 1997, the jointly-operated BN, GBS and SEZ railways merged with BLS to form BLS Lötschbergbahn AG. The organisation was also changed, the company being now based around the three profit-focused core business of infrastructure, passenger traffic and cargo.

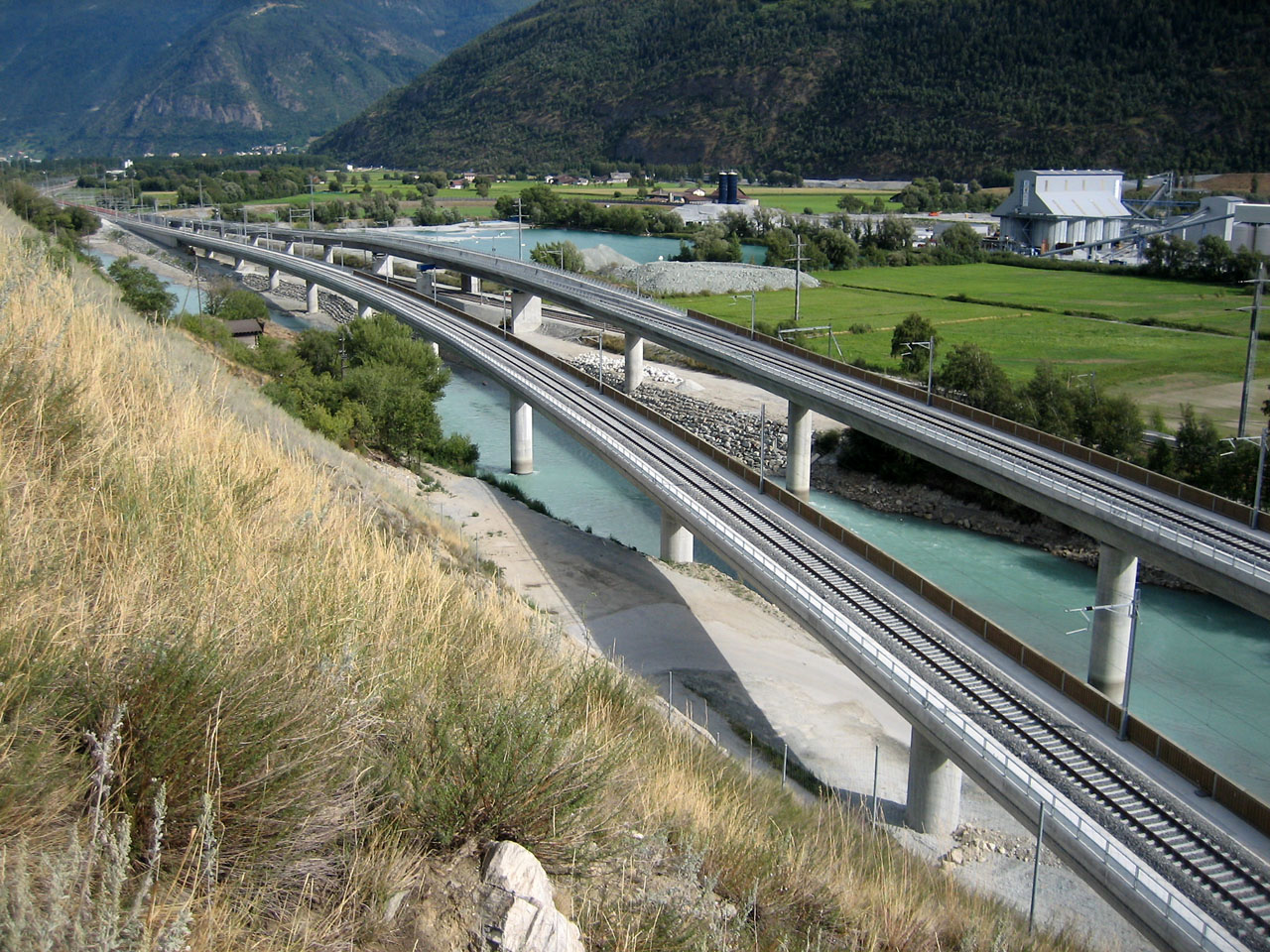
The south side of the Lötschberg Base Tunnel

On 15 May 2001 the BLS and SBB agreed on a new task-sharing arrangement. This was largely implemented as part of the timetable changes made on 12 December 2004 when the BLS took over the running of the SBB's S-Bahn lines and with it, system responsibility for Bern's S-Bahn network, the second largest in the country. This was accompanied by the transfer of long-distance railway operations from the BLS to the SBB. Within the cargo sector the SBB assumed overall control for full-load traffic in Switzerland. Transit and block train traffic has been subject to competition since the signing of the 2001 agreement. The SBB became responsible for rail network management across Switzerland.

On 27 September 1992, the Swiss people voted with an overwhelming majority in favour of the NRLA project for the construction of two transverse routes through the Alps, one at the Gotthard, the other at the Lötschberg. The original NRLA Lötschberg project provided for two single bore tunnels between Frutigen and the Rhône valley, a distance of 41 km (25.5 mi). For financial reasons the tunnel length was shortened to 34.6 km (21.5 mi), and the greater part of one of the bores was only constructed as a shell. The new base line was inaugurated on 15 June 2007 and full standard traffic started with the new timetable on 9 December 2007. In full operation trains are able to travel through the Lötschberg Base Tunnel at speeds of 160–200 km/h (99.4–124.3 mph). Since the completion of NRLA and the opening of the new Lötschberg Base Tunnel, the BLS is responsible for the operation of train services along the entire Lötschberg–Simplon route.

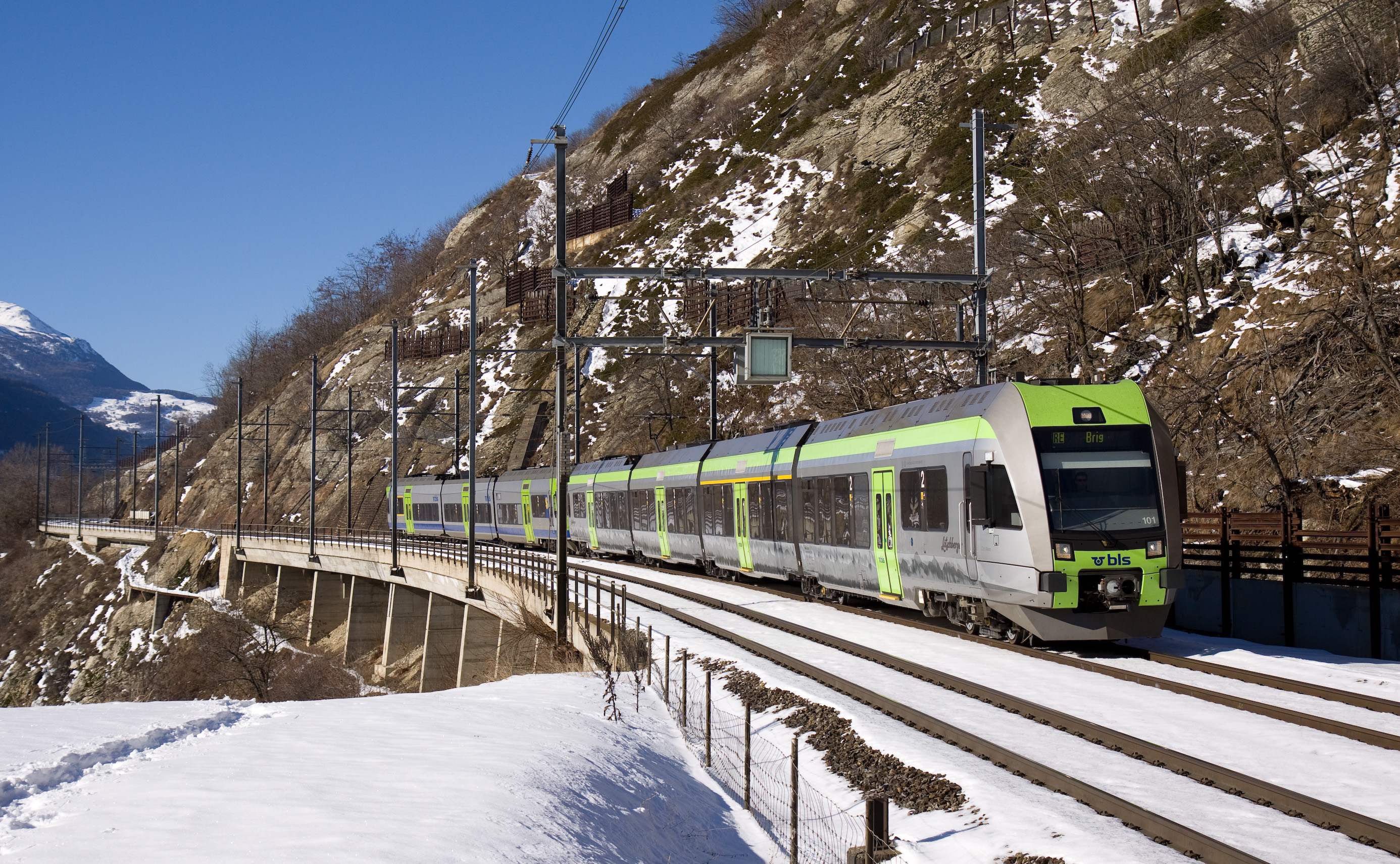
BLS RABe 535 on the southern Lötschberg ramp between Lalden and Brig.

=== Creation of BLS AG ===
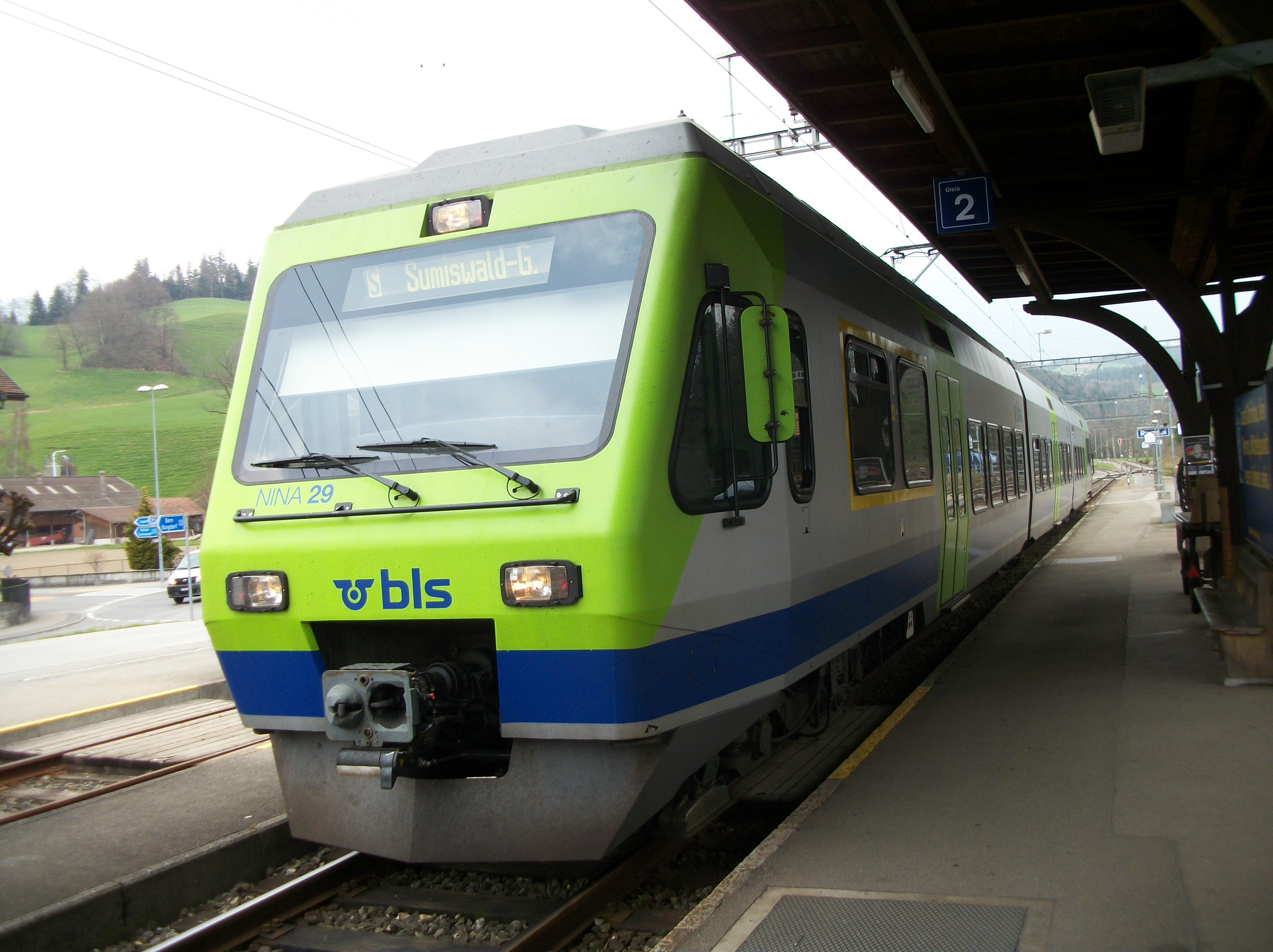
A BLS train at a low-lying platform

In June 2006, following their respective Annual General Meetings and with the approval of the shareholders, the Regionalverkehr Mittelland AG and the BLS Lötschbergbahn AG were merged to form BLS AG. The new undertaking belongs to the canton of Bern (55.8%), the Swiss Confederation (21.7%), and further cantons and private persons (22.5%). The BLS AG was actually founded on 24 April 2006, when the cantons of Bern, Lucerne, Solothurn, Valais, and Neuchâtel exchanged their BLS and RM shares for BLS AG ones.

As a result of the fusion of the companies, the BLS AG became the second-biggest operation on Swiss standard-gauge railways after the Swiss Federal Railways. The BLS AG operates regional traffic in an area that lies between Lake Neuchâtel and Lake Lucerne and the Jura Mountains and the Simplon Massif. It is also responsible for operating most routes of the Bern S-Bahn, together with some of those of the Lucerne S-Bahn.

== See also ==
- Rail transport in Switzerland
