= Ramsei railway station =

Railway station in Lützelflüh, Switzerland

Ramsei
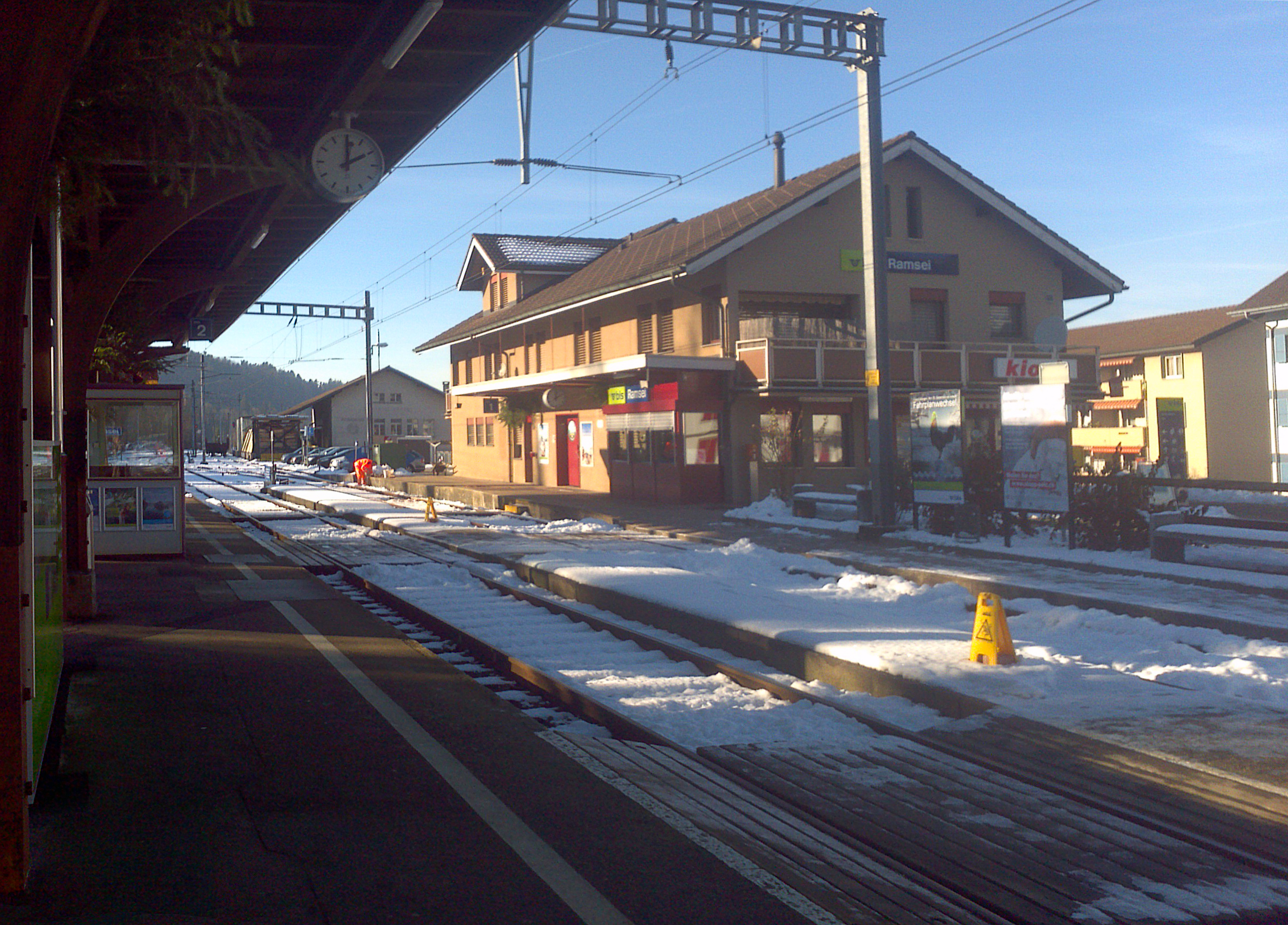
- The station building in 2013

General information
- Location: Lützelflüh; Switzerland
- Coordinates: 46°59′49″N 7°42′36″E
- Elevation: 600 m (2,000 ft)
- Owner: BLS AG
- Lines: Ramsei–Huttwil line; Solothurn–Langnau line
- Distance: 32.4 km (20.1 mi) from Solothurn
- Platforms: 2 (1 island platform)
- Tracks: 2
- Train operators: BLS AG
- Connections: Busland AG buses

Construction
- Parking: Yes (25 spaces)
- Accessible: Yes

Other information
- Station code: 8508267 (RAM)
- Fare zone: 156 (Libero)

Passengers
- 2023: 1'700 per weekday (BLS)

Services
| Preceding station | Bern S-Bahn | Following station |
|---|---|---|
| Lützelflüh-Goldbach towards Thun | S4 | Zollbrück towards Langnau i.E. |
| Grünenmatt towards Sumiswald-Grünen | S44 | Reverses direction |
| Lützelflüh-Goldbach towards Thun | S44 | Reverses direction |
| Grünenmatt towards Sumiswald-Grünen | S45 | Terminus |
Location

Ramsei railway station (German: Bahnhof Ramsei) is a railway station in the municipality of Lützelflüh, in the Swiss canton of Bern. It is located at the junction of the standard gauge Ramsei–Huttwil and Solothurn–Langnau lines of BLS AG.

== Services ==
As of the December 2024 timetable change, the following services stop at Ramsei:

- Bern S-Bahn :
  - S4/S44: half-hourly service to Thun and hourly service to Langnau i.E. or Sumiswald-Grünen.
  - S45: hourly service to Sumiswald-Grünen.
