= Sumiswald-Grünen railway station =

Railway station in Sumiswald, Switzerland

Sumiswald-Grünen
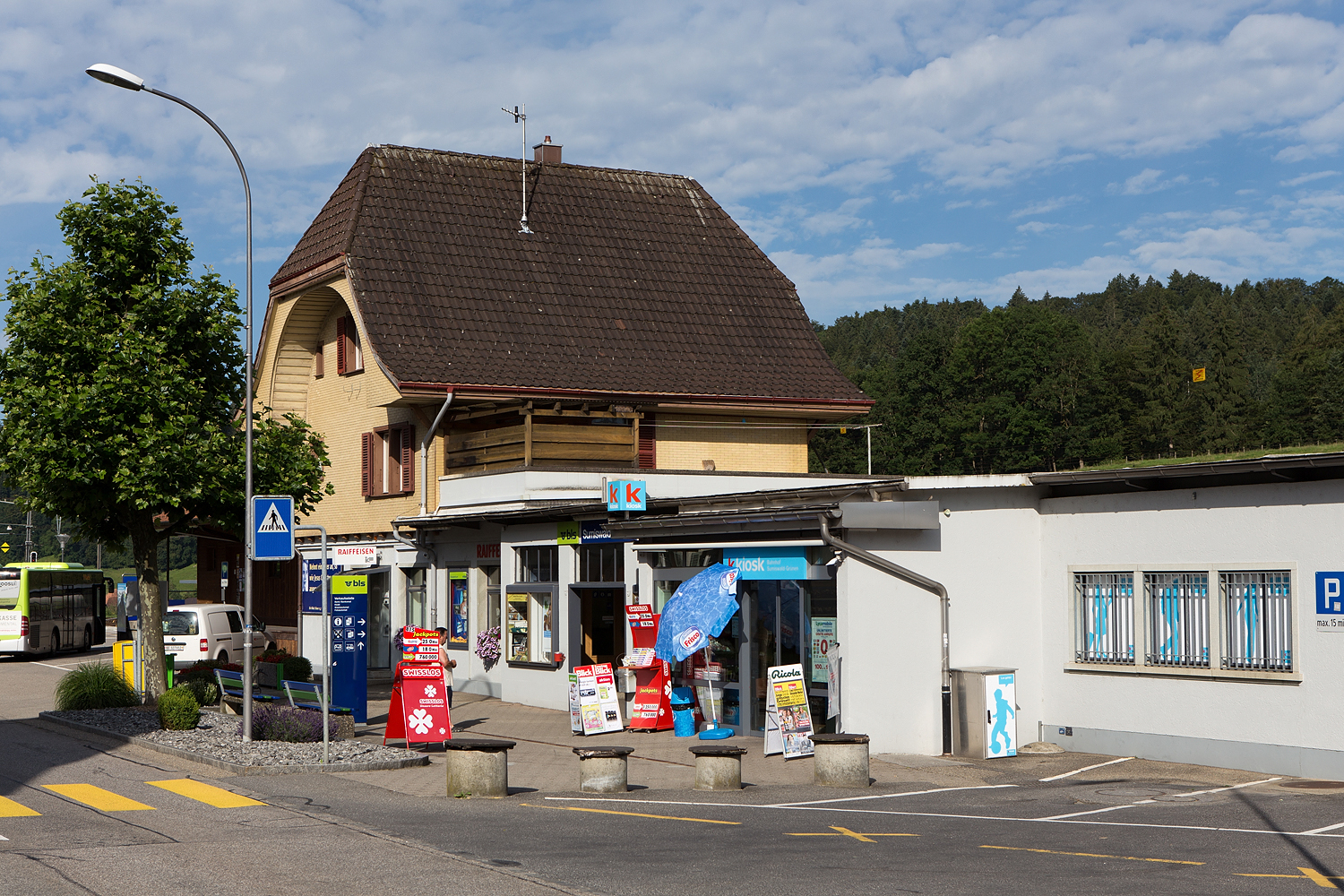
- The station building in 2014

General information
- Location: Sumiswald; Switzerland
- Coordinates: 47°01′30″N 7°44′13″E
- Elevation: 663 m (2,175 ft)
- Owner: BLS AG
- Line: Ramsei–Huttwil line
- Distance: 4.6 km (2.9 mi) from Ramsei
- Platforms: 3: 1 side platform; 1 island platform
- Tracks: 4
- Train operators: BLS AG; Dampfbahn Bern
- Connections: Busland AG buses

Construction
- Parking: Yes (20 spaces)
- Accessible: Yes

Other information
- Station code: 8508272 (SWG)
- Fare zone: 157 (Libero)

Passengers
- 2023: 1'100 per weekday (BLS)

Services
Preceding station	Bern S-Bahn	Following station
Grünenmatt towards Thun	S44	Terminus
Grünenmatt towards Ramsei	S45	Terminus
Preceding station	Dampfbahn Bern	Following station
Terminus	Sumiswald-Grünen to Huttwil	Gammenthal towards Huttwil
Terminus	Sumiswald-Grünen to Wasen	Ei im Emmental towards Wasen
Location
- Location within Switzerland Location within Canton of Bern

Sumiswald-Grünen railway station (German: Bahnhof Sumiswald-Grünen) is a railway station in the municipality of Sumiswald, in the Swiss canton of Bern. It is an intermediate stop on the standard gauge Ramsei–Huttwil line of BLS AG. Sumiswald-Grünen is the eastern terminus of BLS-operated Bern S-Bahn services; the Dampfbahn Bern heritage railway operates seasonal services over the remainder of the line to Huttwil and Wasen.

== Services ==
As of the December 2024 timetable change, the following services stop at Sumiswald-Grünen:

- Bern S-Bahn S44 / S45: two trains per hour to Ramsei with every other train continuing from Ramsei to Thun.
- Dampfbahn Bern:
  - two round-trips one Sunday per month between February and October to Huttwil and Wasen i.E..
