= Bern–Belp–Thun railway =

Railway line in Switzerland

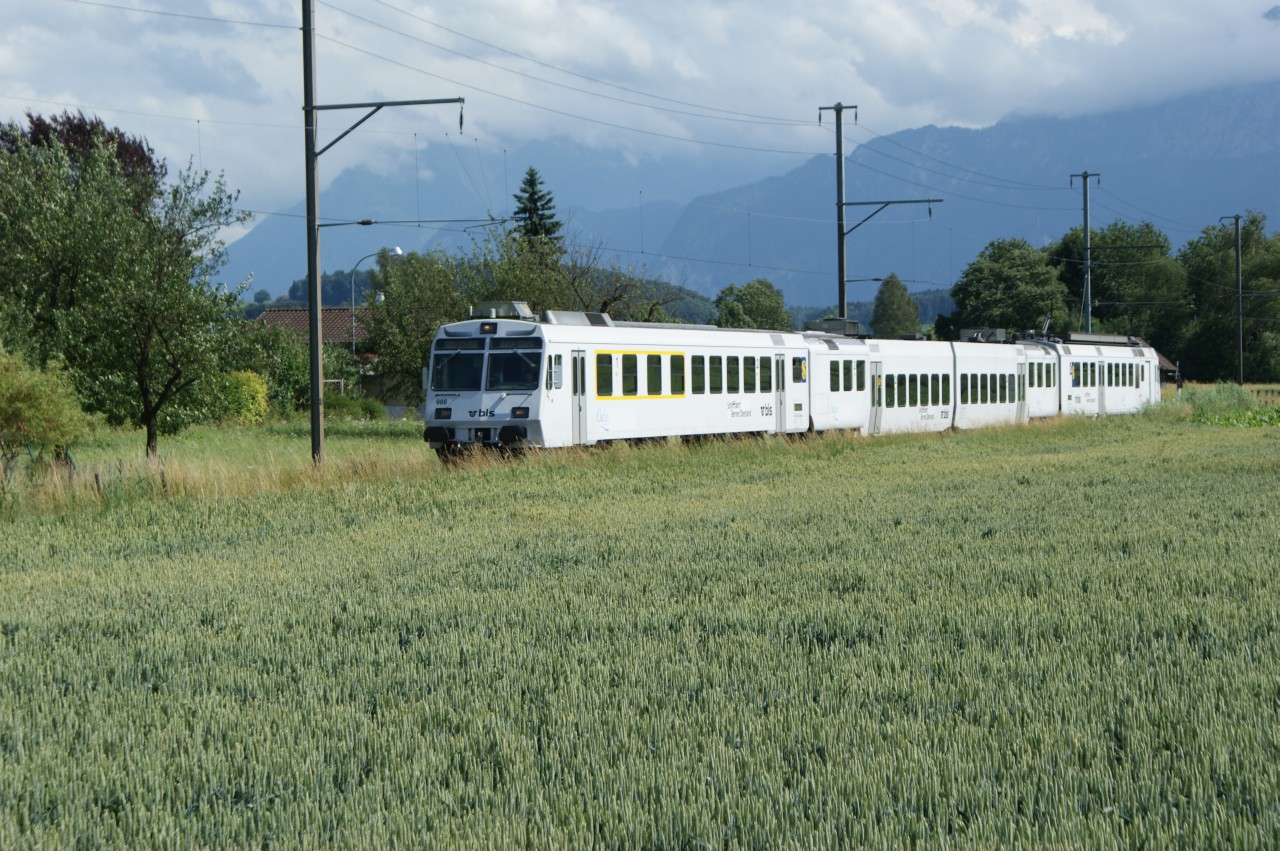
- Push–pull train with RBDe 565 railcars and Jumbo intermediate coaches in the Gürbe valley.

Overview
- Native name: Gürbetalbahn
- Line number: 303
- Termini: Bern; Thun

Technical
- Line length: 34.35 km (21.34 mi)
- Number of tracks: 1 or 2
- Track gauge: 1,435 mm (4 ft 8 1/2 in)
- Electrification: 15 kV/16.7 Hz AC overhead catenary
- Maximum incline: 2.2%

The Bern–Belp–Thun railway is a railway in Switzerland. It is also called the Gürbetalbahn (Gürbe Valley Railway, GTB) after the company that built it. The GTB was founded on 14 August 1901 for the construction and operation of the line through the Gürbetal (Gürbe valley).

== History ==
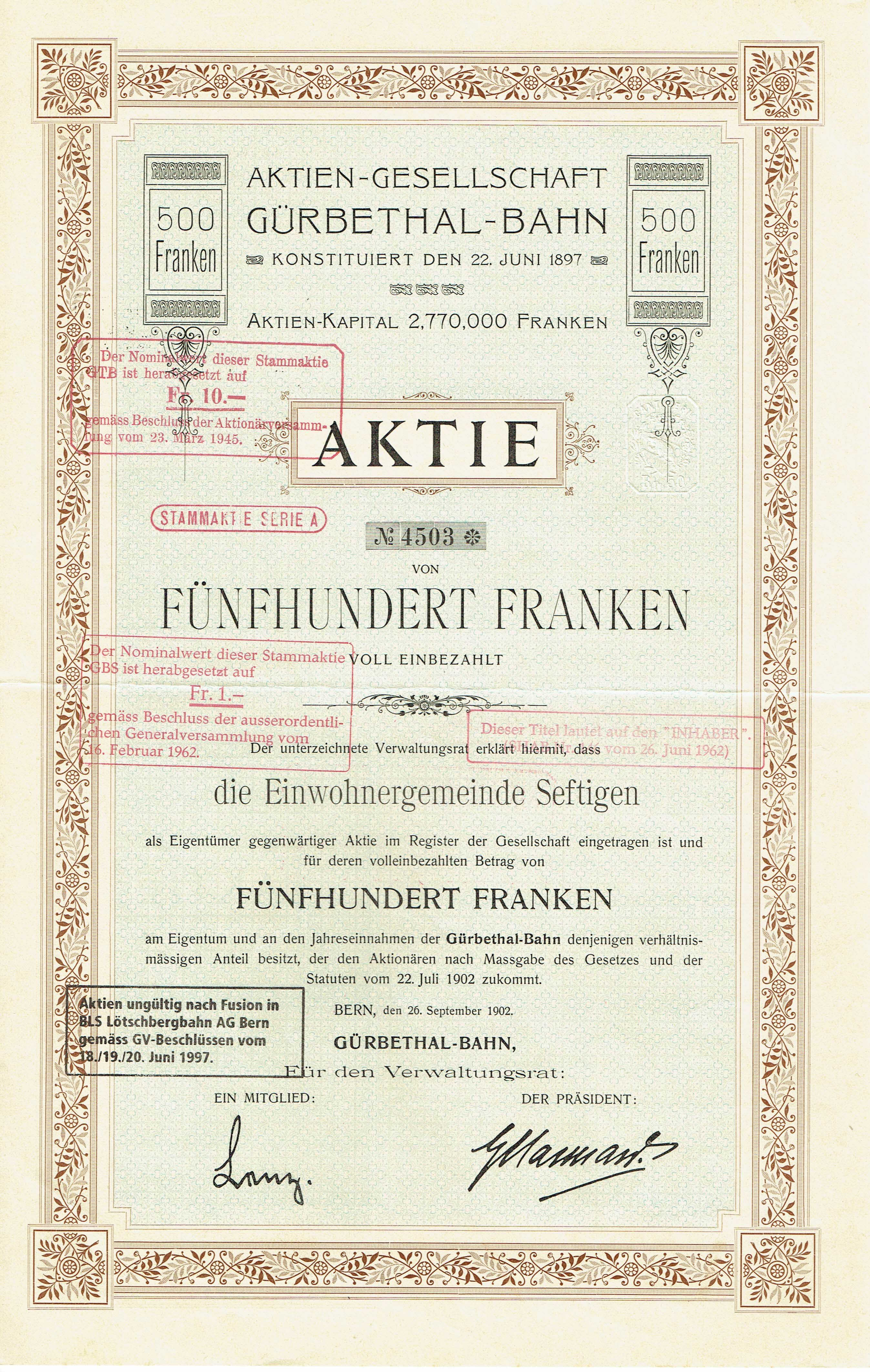
Share of the Gürbethal-Bahn, issued 26. September 1902

The first section of the Gürbe Valley Railway between Bern Weissenbühl and Burgistein-Wattenwil opened on 14 August 1901, with the section from Bern Weissenbühl to the former station of Holligen following on 9 November 1901. The final section from Burgistein-Wattenwil (now Burgistein) to Thun was opened about a year later, on 1 November 1902.

The line was electrified following a decree of the Bernese government, with operations switching to electric power on 16 August 1920. These railways were referred to as Dekretsbahnen (decree railways) and the Ce 4/6 locomotives procured for the electrification were known as Dekretsmühlen (decree mills).

The railway company merged on 1 January 1944 with the Bern-Schwarzenburg-Bahn (Bern-Schwarzenburg Railway, BSB)—another decree railway—to form the Gürbetal-Bern-Schwarzenburg-Bahn (GBS).

The GTB and the BSB, along with the GBS, were part of the BLS Group under the direction of the Bern–Lötschberg–Simplon railway (BLS) and, until 1912, the Lake Thun Railway (Thunerseebahn, TSB). The four members of the group, the BLS, the GBS, the Spiez–Erlenbach-Zweisimmen railway (SEZ) and the Bern–Neuchâtel railway (BN), were merged in 1997 to form the BLS Lötschberg Railway (BLS Lötschbergbahn), which in turn merged with Regionalverkehr Mittelland (RM) in 2006 to form BLS AG. Since 2009, the railway infrastructure has been vested in the BLS Netz AG.

== Rolling stock ==
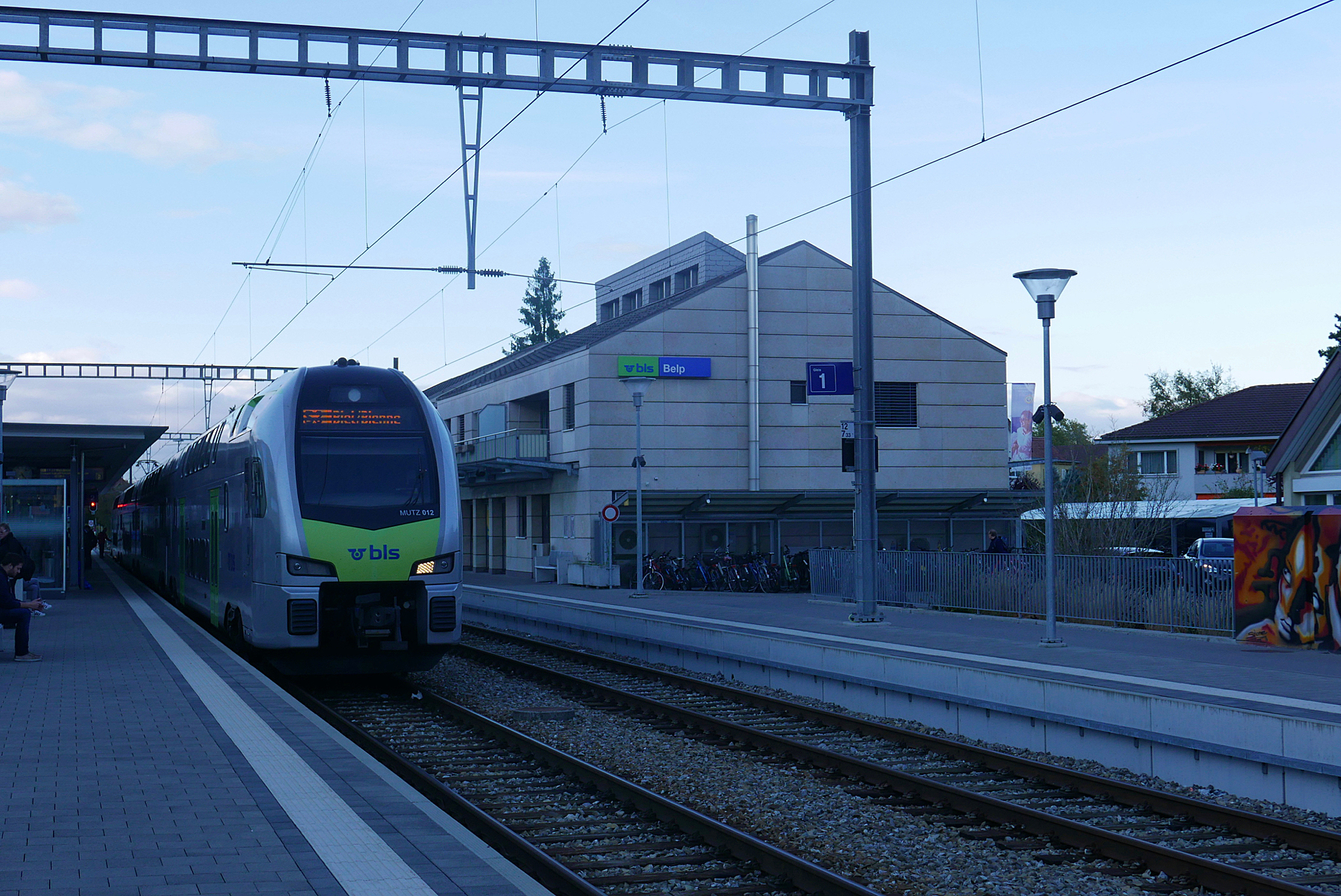
BLS RABe 515 "MUTZ" train in Belp station

The vehicle fleet was always integrated with the fleet of the TSB and subsequently that of the BLS (and used their numbering scheme). Within this operating community, rolling stock was often used on other lines as needed. Care was taken to ensure that each company owned about as many vehicles as needed to operate its line. The vehicle fleet of the Gürbe Valley Railway included a Ce 4/6 locomotive that was transferred to the Club del San Gottardo in 1995.
