= Gerlafingen railway station =

Railway station in Gerlafingen, Switzerland

Gerlafingen
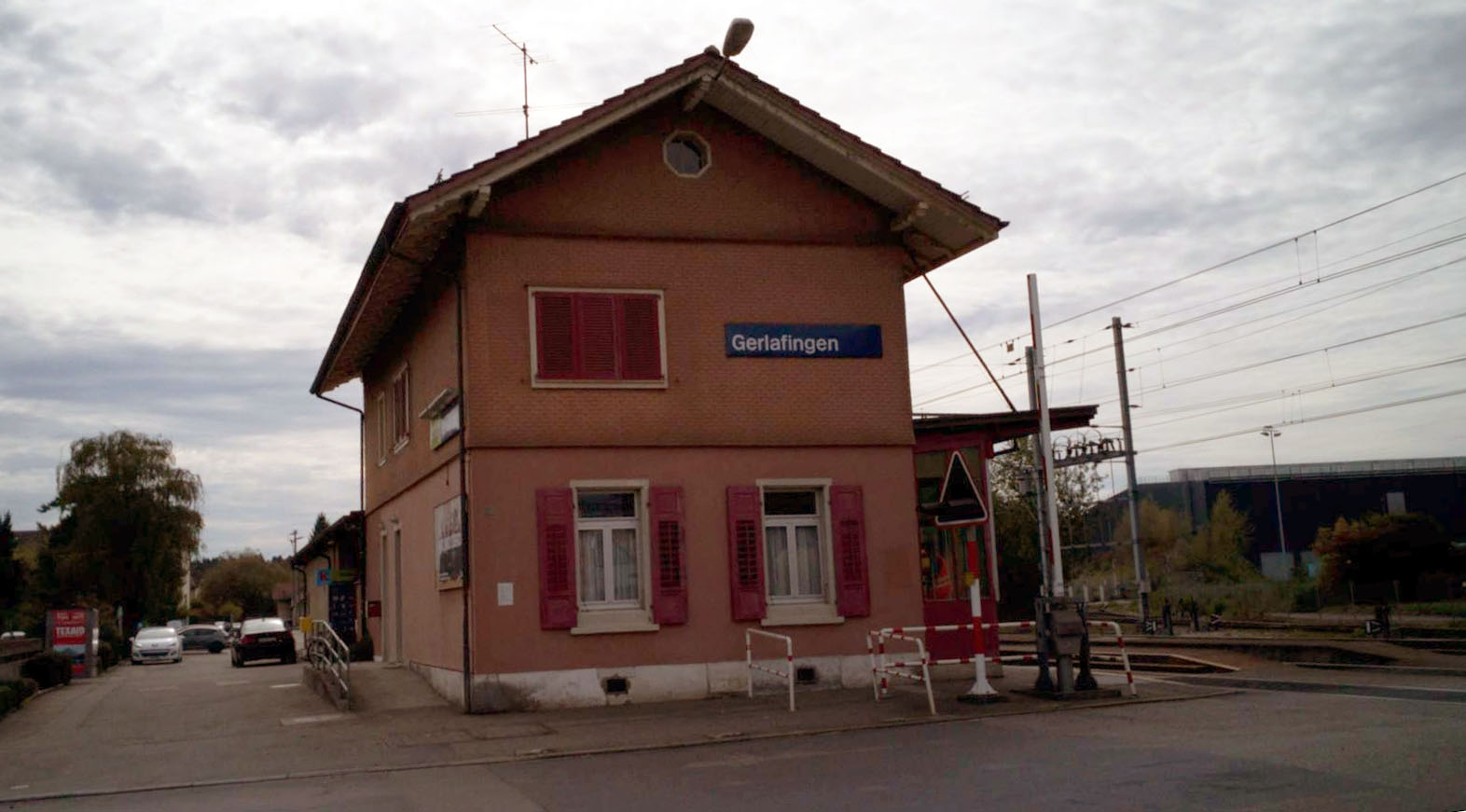
- The station in 2018, before the overhaul

General information
- Location: Gerlafingen; Switzerland
- Coordinates: 47°10′12″N 7°33′54″E
- Elevation: 452 m (1,483 ft)
- Owner: BLS AG
- Line: Solothurn–Langnau line
- Distance: 5.9 km (3.7 mi) from Solothurn
- Platforms: 1 side platform
- Tracks: 2
- Train operators: BLS AG

Construction
- Parking: Yes (19 spaces)
- Accessible: Yes

Other information
- Station code: 8508088 (GLF)
- Fare zone: 201 (Libero)

History
- Rebuilt: 2019-2021

Passengers
- 2023: 570 per weekday (BLS)

Services
Preceding station	Bern S-Bahn	Following station
Wiler towards Thun	S41	Biberist Ost towards Solothurn
Wiler towards Thun	S44	Biberist Ost towards Solothurn
Wiler towards Ostermundigen	S46 Rush-hour service	Solothurn One-way operation
Location

Gerlafingen railway station (German: Bahnhof Gerlafingen) is a railway station in the municipality of Gerlafingen, in the Swiss canton of Solothurn. It is an intermediate stop on the standard gauge Solothurn–Langnau line of BLS AG.

== Services ==
As of the December 2024 timetable change, the following services stop at Gerlafingen:

- Bern S-Bahn:
  - S41/S44: half-hourly service between Thun and Solothurn.
  - S46: morning rush-hour service on weekdays to Ostermundigen.
