= Utzenstorf railway station =

Railway station in Utzenstorf, Switzerland

Utzenstorf
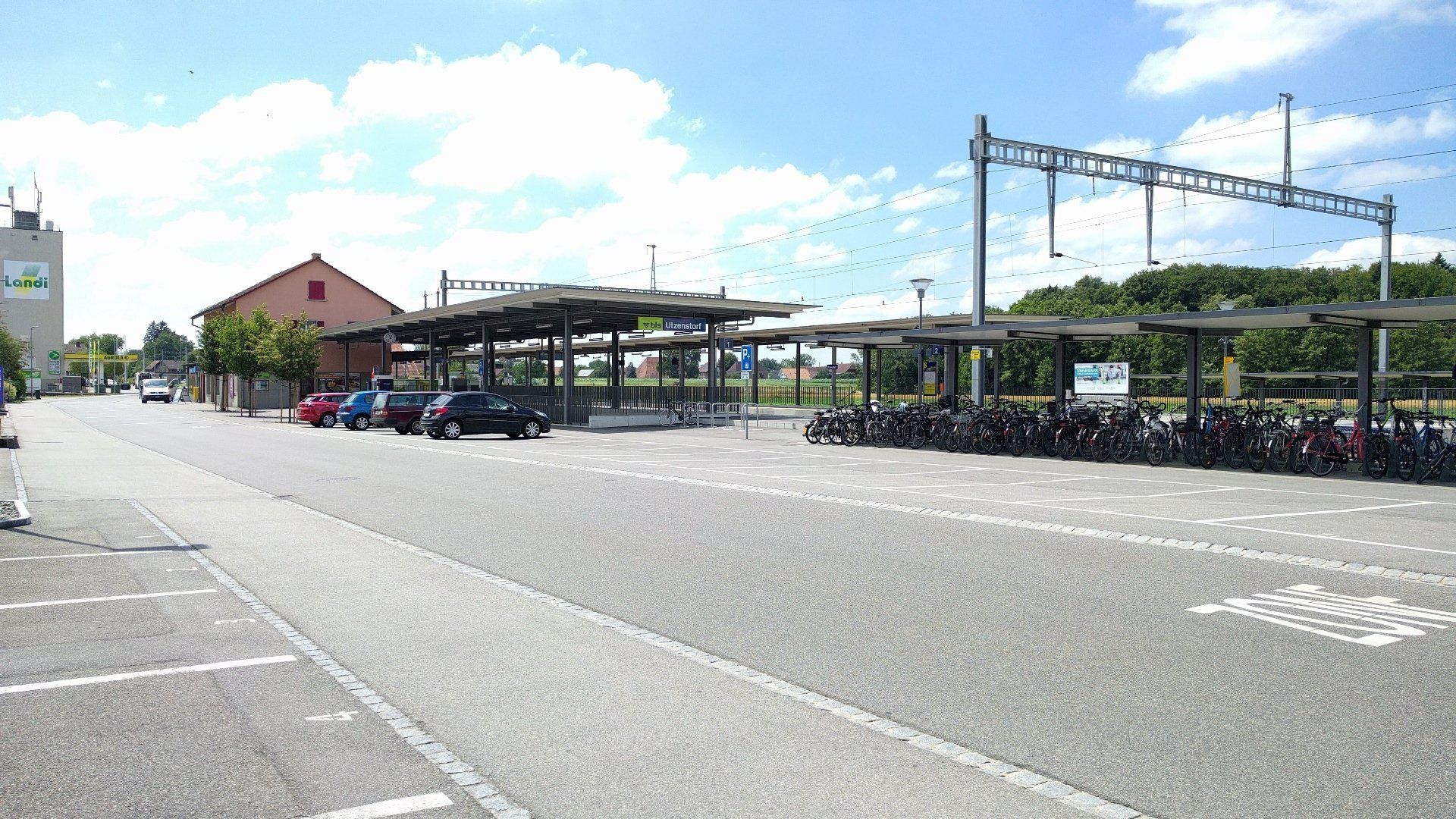
- The station in 2018

General information
- Location: Utzenstorf; Switzerland
- Coordinates: 47°08′N 7°33′E
- Elevation: 474 m (1,555 ft)
- Owner: BLS AG
- Line: Solothurn–Langnau line
- Distance: 10.6 km (6.6 mi) from Solothurn
- Platforms: 2 side platforms
- Tracks: 2
- Train operators: BLS AG
- Connections: Autobusbetrieb RBS bus line

Construction
- Parking: Yes (21 spaces)
- Accessible: Yes

Other information
- Station code: 8508086 (UT)
- Fare zone: 217 (Libero)

Passengers
- 2023: 970 per weekday (BLS)

Services
Preceding station	Bern S-Bahn	Following station
Aefligen towards Thun	S41	Wiler towards Solothurn
Aefligen towards Thun	S44	Wiler towards Solothurn
Aefligen towards Ostermundigen	S46 Rush-hour service	Wiler One-way operation
Location

Utzenstorf railway station (German: Bahnhof Utzenstorf) is a railway station in the municipality of Utzenstorf, in the Swiss canton of Bern. It is an intermediate stop on the standard gauge Solothurn–Langnau line of BLS AG.

== Services ==
As of the December 2024 timetable change, the following services stop at Utzenstorf:

- Bern S-Bahn:
  - S41/S44: half-hourly service between Thun and Solothurn.
  - S46: morning rush-hour service on weekdays to Ostermundigen.
