= Kirchberg-Alchenflüh railway station =

Railway station in Rüdtligen-Alchenflüh, Switzerland

Kirchberg-Alchenflüh
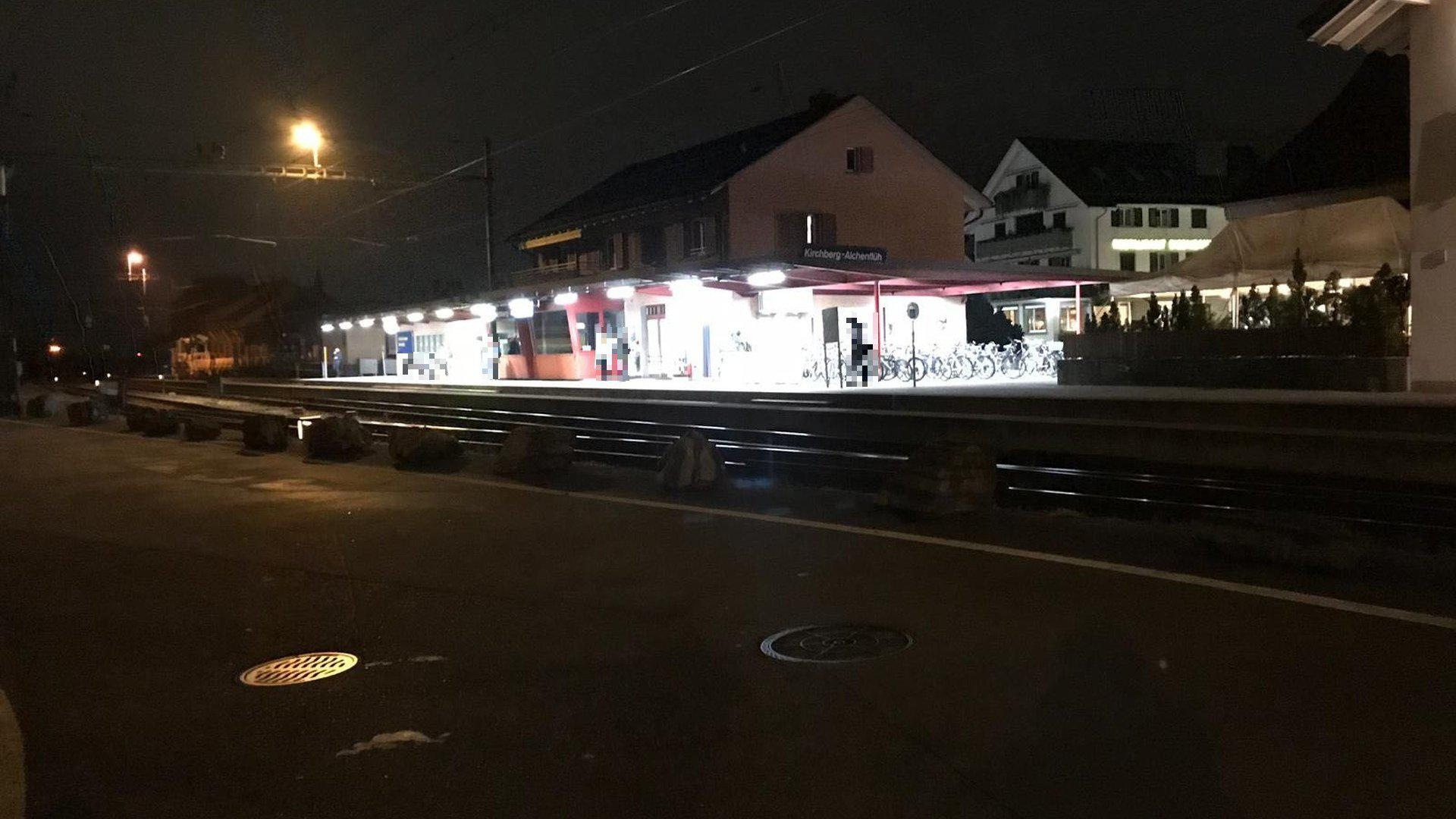
- The station building in 2018, before the overhaul

General information
- Location: Rüdtligen-Alchenflüh; Switzerland
- Coordinates: 47°04′59″N 7°34′48″E
- Elevation: 509 m (1,670 ft)
- Owner: BLS AG
- Line: Solothurn–Langnau line
- Distance: 16.8 km (10.4 mi) from Solothurn
- Platforms: 2 side platforms
- Tracks: 2
- Train operators: BLS AG
- Connections: Busland AG bus line

Construction
- Parking: Yes (5 spaces)
- Accessible: Yes

Other information
- Station code: 8508084 (KIAL)
- Fare zone: 150 (Libero)

History
- Rebuilt: 2021-2023

Passengers
- 2023: 810 per weekday (BLS)

Services
Preceding station	Bern S-Bahn	Following station
Aefligen towards Solothurn	S41	Burgdorf Buchmatt towards Thun
Aefligen towards Solothurn	S44	Burgdorf Buchmatt towards Thun
Aefligen One-way operation	S46 Rush-hour service	Burgdorf Buchmatt towards Ostermundigen
Location

Kirchberg-Alchenflüh railway station (German: Bahnhof Kirchberg-Alchenflüh) is a railway station in the municipality of Rüdtligen-Alchenflüh, in the Swiss canton of Bern. It is an intermediate stop on the standard gauge Solothurn–Langnau line of BLS AG.

== Services ==
As of the December 2024 timetable change, the following services stop at Kirchberg-Alchenflüh:

- Bern S-Bahn:
  - S41/S44: half-hourly service between Thun and Solothurn.
  - S46: morning rush-hour service on weekdays to Ostermundigen.
