= Wiler railway station =

Railway station in Wiler bei Utzenstorf, Switzerland

Wiler
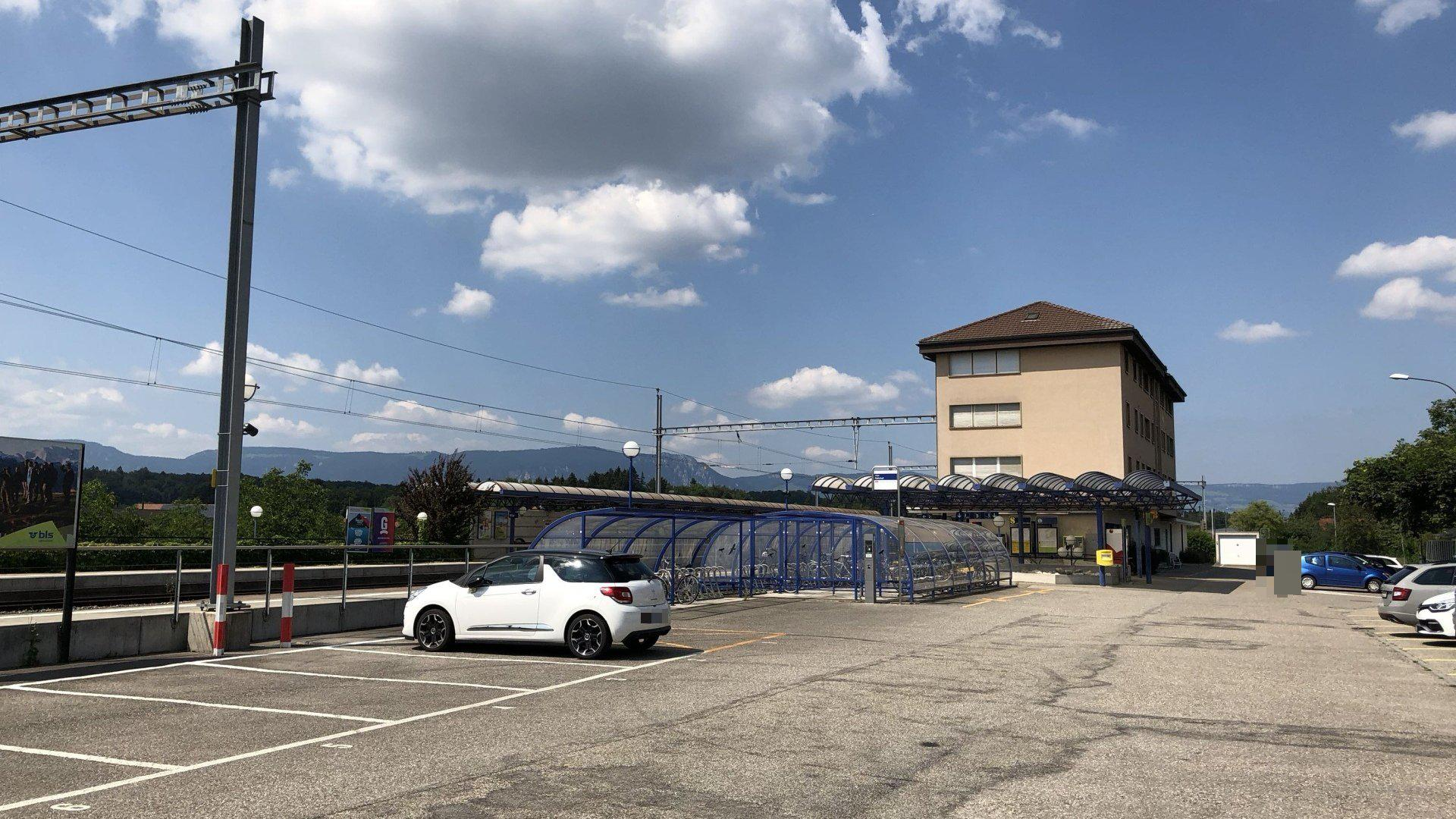
- The station in 2018

General information
- Location: Wiler bei Utzenstorf; Switzerland
- Coordinates: 47°09′N 7°34′E
- Elevation: 463 m (1,519 ft)
- Owner: BLS AG
- Line: Solothurn–Langnau line
- Distance: 8.2 km (5.1 mi) from Solothurn
- Platforms: 2 side platforms
- Tracks: 2
- Train operators: BLS AG

Construction
- Parking: Yes (11 spaces)
- Cycle facilities: Yes (60 spaces)
- Accessible: Yes

Other information
- Station code: 8508087 (WR)
- Fare zone: 217 (Libero)

Passengers
- 2023: 300 per weekday (BLS)

Services
Preceding station	Bern S-Bahn	Following station
Utzenstorf towards Thun	S41	Gerlafingen towards Solothurn
Utzenstorf towards Thun	S44	Gerlafingen towards Solothurn
Utzenstorf towards Ostermundigen	S46 Rush-hour service	Gerlafingen One-way operation
Location

Wiler railway station (German: Bahnhof Wiler) is a railway station in the municipality of Wiler bei Utzenstorf, in the Swiss canton of Bern. It is an intermediate stop on the standard gauge Solothurn–Langnau line of BLS AG.

== Services ==
As of the December 2024 timetable change, the following services stop at Wiler:

- Bern S-Bahn:
  - S41/S44: half-hourly service between Thun and Solothurn.
  - S46: morning rush-hour service on weekdays to Ostermundigen.
