= Aefligen railway station =

Railway station in Aefligen, Switzerland

Aefligen
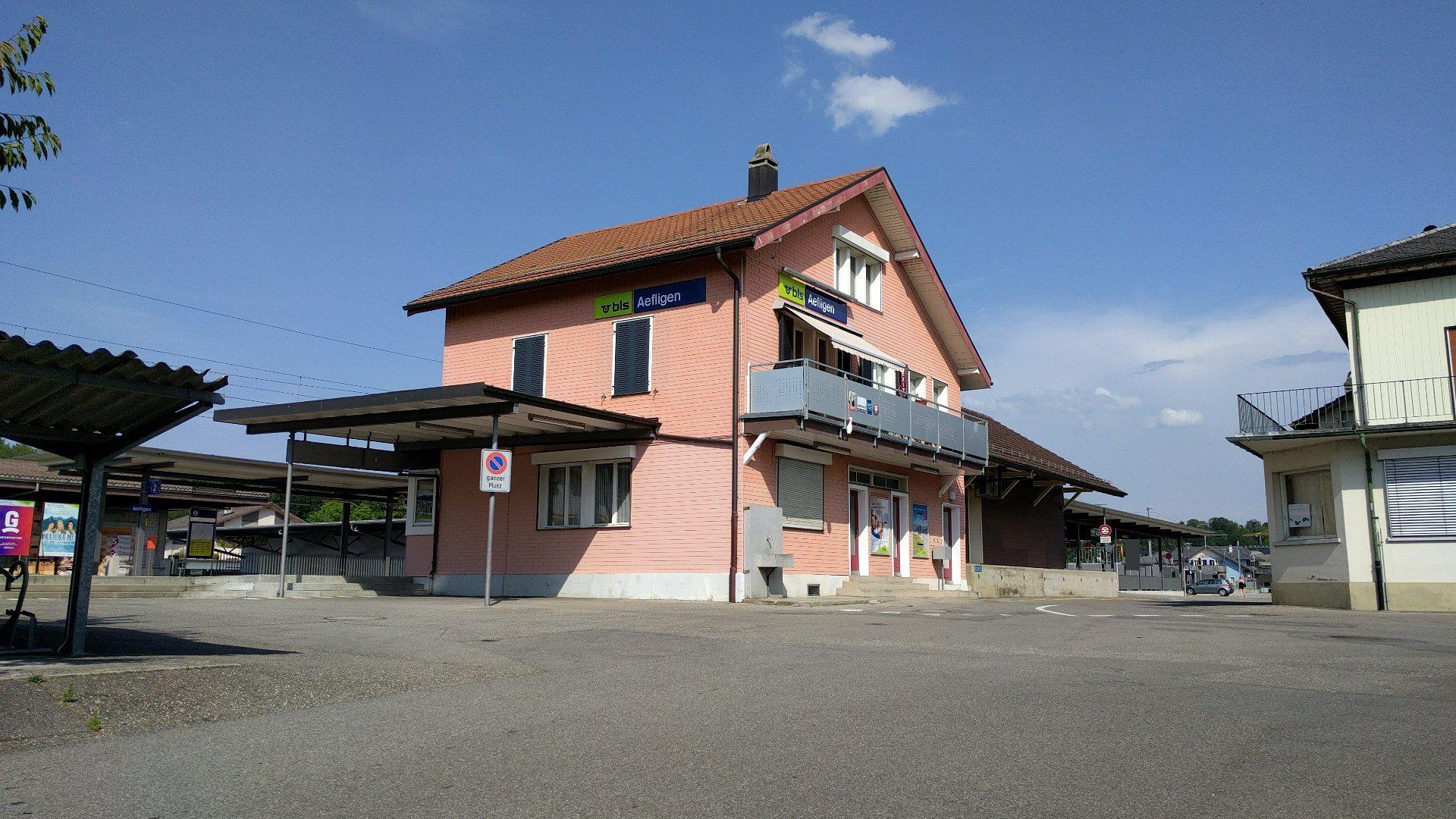
- The station building in 2018

General information
- Location: Aefligen; Switzerland
- Coordinates: 47°06′N 7°34′E
- Elevation: 497 m (1,631 ft)
- Owner: BLS AG
- Line: Solothurn–Langnau line
- Distance: 14.6 km (9.1 mi) from Solothurn
- Platforms: 2 side platforms
- Tracks: 2
- Train operators: BLS AG
- Connections: Busland AG bus line

Construction
- Parking: Yes (16 spaces)
- Accessible: Yes

Other information
- Station code: 8508085 (AEF)
- Fare zone: 153 (Libero)

Passengers
- 2023: 480 per weekday (BLS)

Services
Preceding station	Bern S-Bahn	Following station
Utzenstorf towards Solothurn	S41	Kirchberg-Alchenflüh towards Thun
Utzenstorf towards Solothurn	S44	Kirchberg-Alchenflüh towards Thun
Utzenstorf One-way operation	S46 Rush-hour service	Kirchberg-Alchenflüh towards Ostermundigen
Location

Aefligen railway station (German: Bahnhof Aefligen) is a railway station in the municipality of Aefligen, in the Swiss canton of Bern. It is an intermediate stop on the standard gauge Solothurn–Langnau line of BLS AG.

== Services ==
As of the December 2024 timetable change, the following services stop at Aefligen:

- Bern S-Bahn:
  - S41/S44: half-hourly service between Thun and Solothurn.
  - S46: morning rush-hour service on weekdays to Ostermundigen.

== Gallery ==
Aerial view (1931)

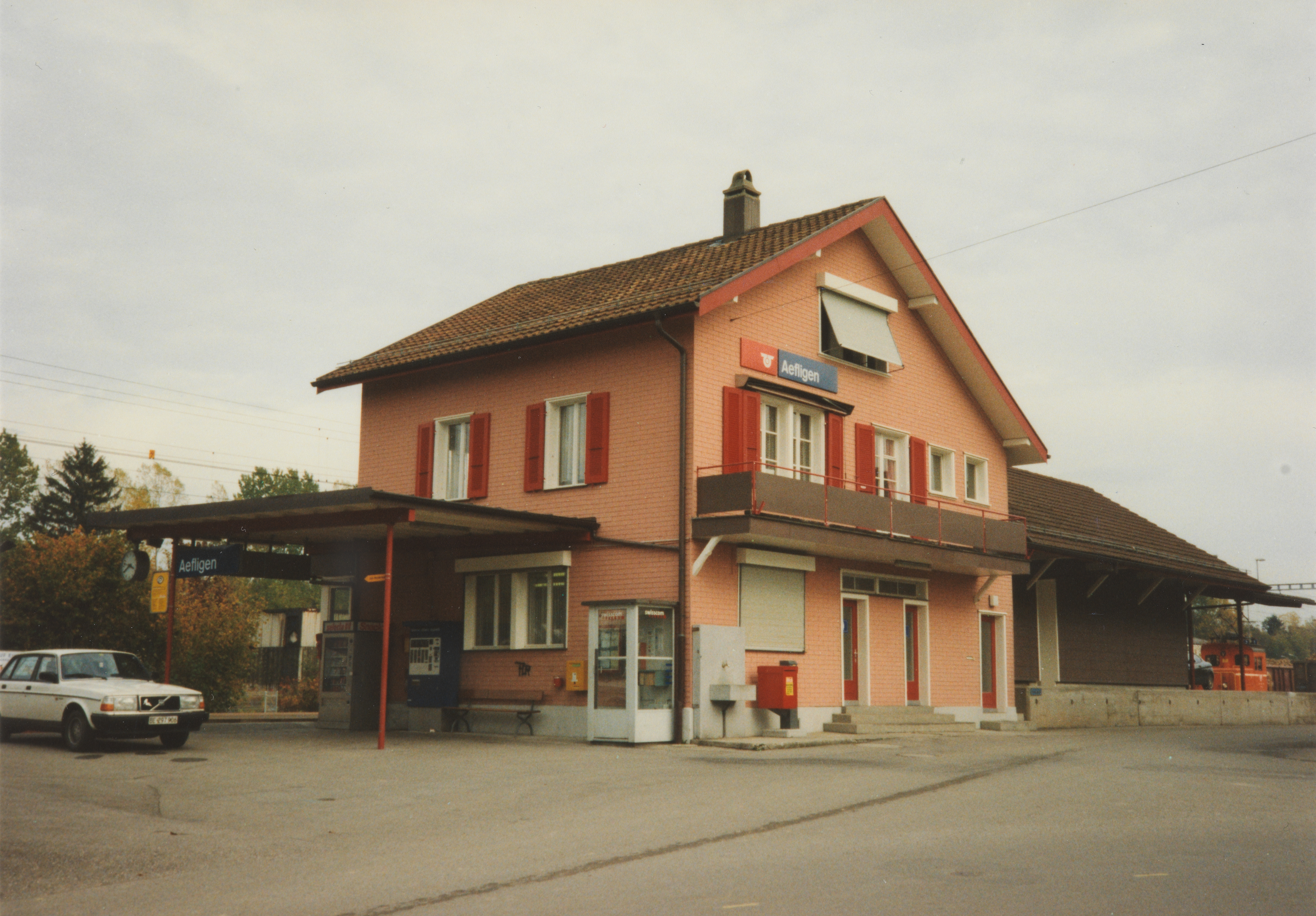
station building, street-side (1998)
