= Burgdorf Buchmatt railway station =

Railway station in Burgdorf

Burgdorf Buchmatt
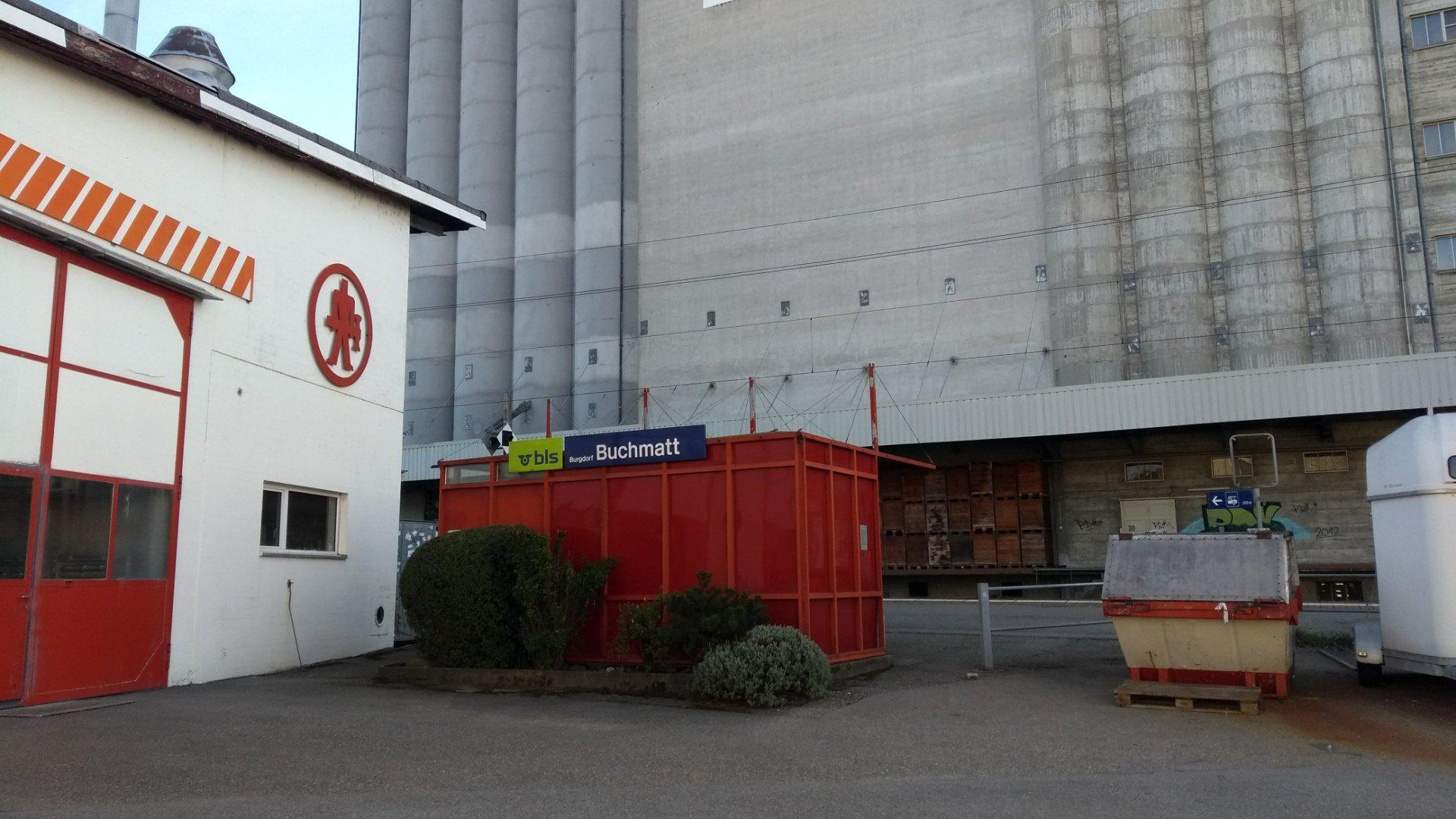
- The station platform in 2018

General information
- Location: Burgdorf; Switzerland
- Coordinates: 47°03′54″N 7°36′29″E
- Elevation: 525 m (1,722 ft)
- Owner: BLS AG
- Line: Solothurn–Langnau line
- Distance: 19.7 km (12.2 mi) from Solothurn
- Platforms: 1 side platform
- Tracks: 1
- Train operators: BLS AG
- Connections: Busland AG bus line

Construction
- Accessible: Yes

Other information
- Station code: 8508083 (BDFB)
- Fare zone: 150 (Libero)

Passengers
- 2023: 230 per weekday (BLS)

Services
Preceding station	Bern S-Bahn	Following station
Kirchberg-Alchenflüh towards Solothurn	S41	Burgdorf towards Thun
Kirchberg-Alchenflüh towards Solothurn	S44	Burgdorf towards Thun
Kirchberg-Alchenflüh One-way operation	S46 Rush-hour service	Burgdorf towards Ostermundigen
Location

Burgdorf Buchmatt railway station (German: Bahnhof Burgdorf Buchmatt) is a railway station in the municipality of Burgdorf, in the Swiss canton of Bern. It is an intermediate stop on the standard gauge Solothurn–Langnau line of BLS AG.

== Services ==
As of the December 2024 timetable change, the following services stop at Burgdorf Buchmatt:

- Bern S-Bahn:
  - S41/S44: half-hourly service between Thun and Solothurn.
  - S46: morning rush-hour service on weekdays to Ostermundigen.
