= Obergerlafingen =

- Municipality
- Coat of arms
- Location of Obergerlafingen
- Location within Switzerland Location within Canton of Solothurn
- Coordinates: 47°10′N 7°35′E
- Country: Switzerland
- Canton: Solothurn
- District: Wasseramt

Area
  - Total: 1.52 km^{2} (0.59 sq mi)
- Elevation: 462 m (1,516 ft)

Population (December 2020)
  - Total: 1,247
  - Density: 820/km^{2} (2,120/sq mi)
- Time zone: UTC+01:00 (CET)
  - Summer (DST): UTC+02:00 (CEST)
- Postal code: 4564
- SFOS number: 2528
- ISO 3166 code: CH-SO
- Surrounded by: Gerlafingen, Koppigen (BE), Kriegstetten, Recherswil, Utzenstorf (BE), Zielebach (BE)
- Website: www.obergerlafingen.ch

Obergerlafingen is a municipality in the district of Wasseramt in the canton of Solothurn in Switzerland.

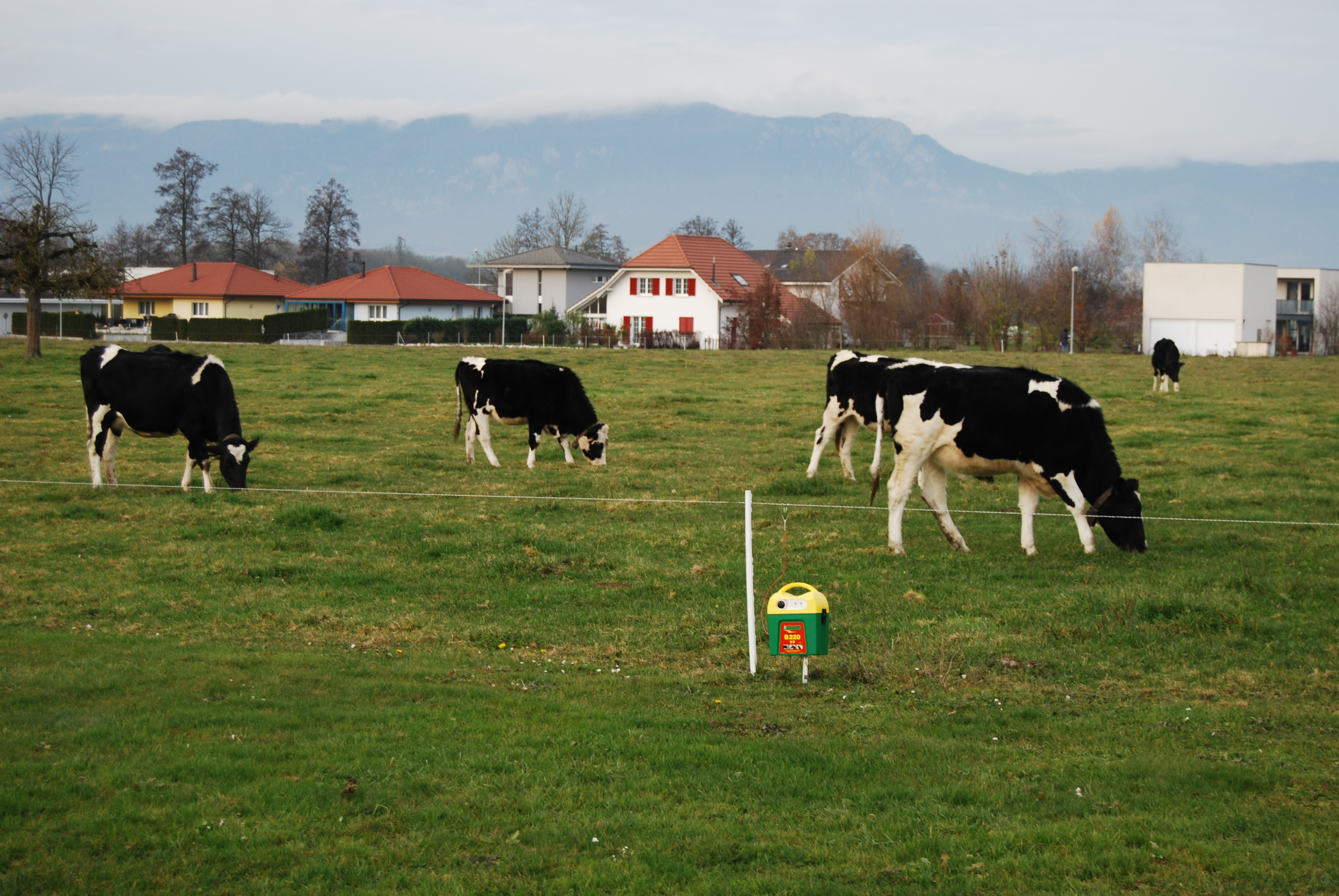
Obergerlafingen

== History ==
Obergerlafingen is first mentioned in 1278 as Oburgeroluingen.

== Geography ==
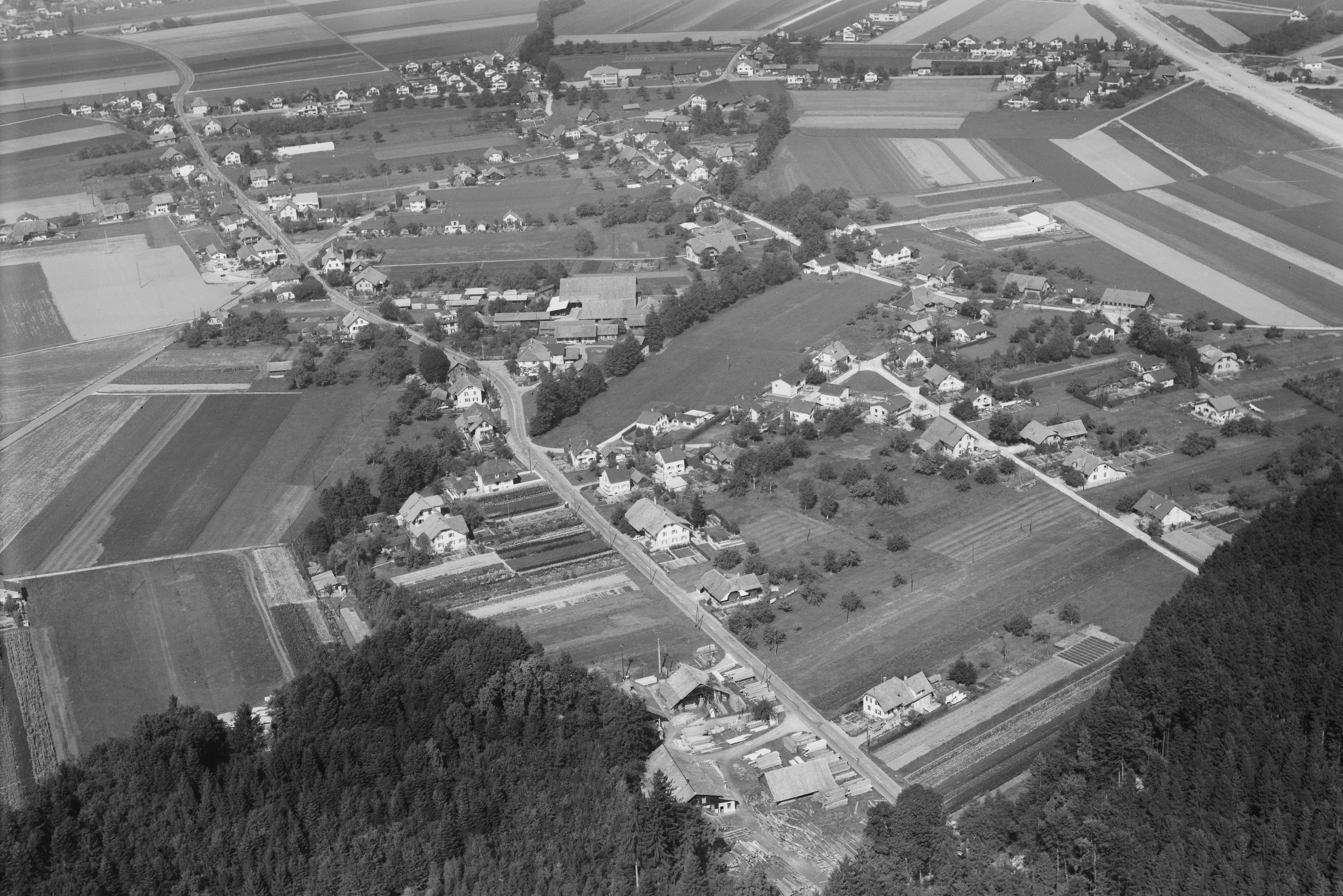
Aerial view (1964)

Obergerlafingen has an area, as of 2009, of 1.52 square kilometers (0.59 sq mi). Of this area, 0.73 km^{2} (0.28 sq mi) or 48.0% is used for agricultural purposes, while 0.3 km^{2} (0.12 sq mi) or 19.7% is forested. Of the rest of the land, 0.49 km^{2} (0.19 sq mi) or 32.2% is settled (buildings or roads).

Of the built up area, industrial buildings made up 3.3% of the total area while housing and buildings made up 21.1% and transportation infrastructure made up 5.9%. while parks, green belts and sports fields made up 2.0%. Out of the forested land, all of the forested land area is covered with heavy forests. Of the agricultural land, 35.5% is used for growing crops and 10.5% is pastures, while 2.0% is used for orchards or vine crops.

The municipality is located in the Wasseramt district, between the Emme and Oesch rivers. It consists of the linear village of Obergerlafingen.

== Coat of arms ==
The blazon of the municipal coat of arms is Gules three Mullets Argent in pale.

== Demographics ==
Obergerlafingen has a population (as of December 2020) of 1,247. As of 2008, 7.3% of the population are resident foreign nationals. Over the last 10 years (1999–2009 ) the population has changed at a rate of -1.4%. It has changed at a rate of 2.7% due to migration and at a rate of -1.8% due to births and deaths.

Most of the population (as of 2000) speaks German (1,017 or 97.1%), with Italian being second most common (13 or 1.2%) and French being third (8 or 0.8%).

As of 2008, the gender distribution of the population was 50.1% male and 49.9% female. The population was made up of 495 Swiss men (45.4% of the population) and 51 (4.7%) non-Swiss men. There were 510 Swiss women (46.8%) and 34 (3.1%) non-Swiss women. Of the population in the municipality 278 or about 26.6% were born in Obergerlafingen and lived there in 2000. There were 347 or 33.1% who were born in the same canton, while 311 or 29.7% were born somewhere else in Switzerland, and 71 or 6.8% were born outside of Switzerland.

In 2008 there were 5 live births to Swiss citizens and were 12 deaths of Swiss citizens. Ignoring immigration and emigration, the population of Swiss citizens decreased by 7 while the foreign population remained the same. There was 1 Swiss woman who immigrated back to Switzerland. At the same time, there were 3 non-Swiss men and 1 non-Swiss woman who immigrated from another country to Switzerland. The total Swiss population change in 2008 (from all sources, including moves across municipal borders) was a decrease of 23 and the non-Swiss population increased by 1 people. This represents a population growth rate of -2.0%.

The age distribution, as of 2000, in Obergerlafingen is; 57 children or 5.4% of the population are between 0 and 6 years old and 159 teenagers or 15.2% are between 7 and 19. Of the adult population, 55 people or 5.3% of the population are between 20 and 24 years old. 302 people or 28.8% are between 25 and 44, and 310 people or 29.6% are between 45 and 64. The senior population distribution is 117 people or 11.2% of the population are between 65 and 79 years old and there are 47 people or 4.5% who are over 80.

As of 2000, there were 378 people who were single and never married in the municipality. There were 567 married individuals, 52 widows or widowers and 50 individuals who are divorced.

As of 2000, there were 441 private households in the municipality, and an average of 2.4 persons per household. There were 99 households that consist of only one person and 25 households with five or more people. Out of a total of 447 households that answered this question, 22.1% were households made up of just one person and there were 5 adults who lived with their parents. Of the rest of the households, there are 178 married couples without children, 130 married couples with children There were 20 single parents with a child or children. There were 9 households that were made up of unrelated people and 6 households that were made up of some sort of institution or another collective housing.

In 2000 there were 276 single family homes (or 76.0% of the total) out of a total of 363 inhabited buildings. There were 50 multi-family buildings (13.8%), along with 19 multi-purpose buildings that were mostly used for housing (5.2%) and 18 other use buildings (commercial or industrial) that also had some housing (5.0%). Of the single family homes 16 were built before 1919, while 41 were built between 1990 and 2000. The greatest number of single family homes (64) were built between 1971 and 1980.

In 2000 there were 474 apartments in the municipality. The most common apartment size was 4 rooms of which there were 149. There were 8 single room apartments and 216 apartments with five or more rooms. Of these apartments, a total of 435 apartments (91.8% of the total) were permanently occupied, while 27 apartments (5.7%) were seasonally occupied and 12 apartments (2.5%) were empty. As of 2009, the construction rate of new housing units was 0.9 new units per 1000 residents. The vacancy rate for the municipality, in 2010, was 0.41%.

The historical population is given in the following chart:

== Politics ==
In the 2007 federal election the most popular party was the SVP which received 33.36% of the vote. The next three most popular parties were the SP (24.97%), the FDP (20.03%) and the CVP (11.23%). In the federal election, a total of 392 votes were cast, and the voter turnout was 46.4%.

== Economy ==
As of 2010, Obergerlafingen had an unemployment rate of 2.6%. As of 2008, there were 5 people employed in the primary economic sector and about 3 businesses involved in this sector. 202 people were employed in the secondary sector and there were 21 businesses in this sector. 134 people were employed in the tertiary sector, with 36 businesses in this sector. There were 581 residents of the municipality who were employed in some capacity, of which females made up 43.9% of the workforce.

In 2008 the total number of full-time equivalent jobs was 272. The number of jobs in the primary sector was 4, all of which were in agriculture. The number of jobs in the secondary sector was 158 of which 130 or (82.3%) were in manufacturing and 28 (17.7%) were in construction. The number of jobs in the tertiary sector was 110. In the tertiary sector; 46 or 41.8% were in wholesale or retail sales or the repair of motor vehicles, 5 or 4.5% were in the movement and storage of goods, 6 or 5.5% were in a hotel or restaurant, 8 or 7.3% were in the information industry, 16 or 14.5% were technical professionals or scientists, 4 or 3.6% were in education and 1 was in health care.

In 2000, there were 158 workers who commuted into the municipality and 469 workers who commuted away. The municipality is a net exporter of workers, with about 3.0 workers leaving the municipality for every one entering. Of the working population, 8.8% used public transportation to get to work, and 65.1% used a private car.

== Religion ==
From the 2000 census, 297 or 28.4% were Roman Catholic, while 520 or 49.7% belonged to the Swiss Reformed Church. Of the rest of the population, there were 6 members of an Orthodox church (or about 0.57% of the population), there were 5 individuals (or about 0.48% of the population) who belonged to the Christian Catholic Church, and there were 11 individuals (or about 1.05% of the population) who belonged to another Christian church. There was 1 person who was Buddhist and 1 individual who belonged to another church. 187 (or about 17.86% of the population) belonged to no church, are agnostic or atheist, and 19 individuals (or about 1.81% of the population) did not answer the question.

== Education ==
In Obergerlafingen about 512 or (48.9%) of the population have completed non-mandatory upper secondary education, and 98 or (9.4%) have completed additional higher education (either university or a Fachhochschule). Of the 98 who completed tertiary schooling, 80.6% were Swiss men, 14.3% were Swiss women.

As of 2000, there were 2 students in Obergerlafingen who came from another municipality, while 66 residents attended schools outside the municipality.
