= Kriegstetten =

- Municipality
- Coat of arms
- Location of Kriegstetten
- Location within Switzerland Location within Canton of Solothurn
- Coordinates: 47°11′N 7°36′E
- Country: Switzerland
- Canton: Solothurn
- District: Wasseramt

Area
  - Total: 1.14 km^{2} (0.44 sq mi)
- Elevation: 453 m (1,486 ft)

Population (2025)
  - Total: 3,172
  - Density: 2,780/km^{2} (7,210/sq mi)
- Time zone: UTC+01:00 (CET)
  - Summer (DST): UTC+02:00 (CEST)
- Postal code: 4566
- SFOS number: 2525
- ISO 3166 code: CH-SO
- Surrounded by: Derendingen, Gerlafingen, Halten, Obergerlafingen, Oekingen, Recherswil
- Website: www.kriegstetten.ch

Kriegstetten is a municipality in the district of Wasseramt in the canton of Solothurn in Switzerland.

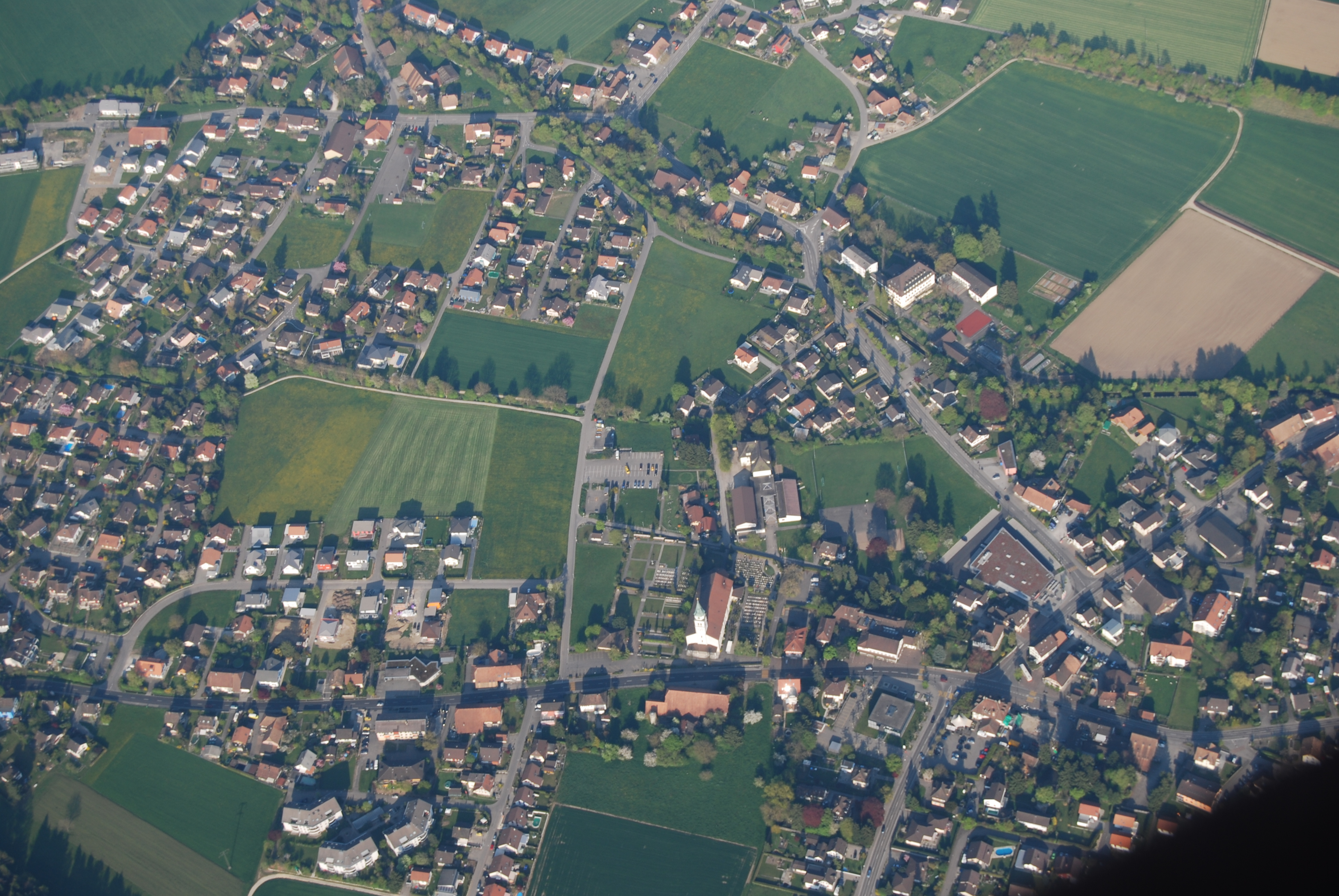
Kriegstetten

== History ==
Kriegstetten is first mentioned in 1256 as Krechsteiten and as Kriechsteiten.

On 1 January 2026, the former municipalities of Halten, Switzerland and Oekingen merged with Kriegstetten, forming a new enlarged municipality under the name Kriegstetten. Voters in all three municipalities had approved the merger on 18 May 2025.

== Geography ==
Aerial view (1970)

Kriegstetten has an area, as of 2009, of 1.14 square kilometers (0.44 sq mi). Of this area, 0.5 km^{2} (0.19 sq mi) or 43.9% is used for agricultural purposes, while 0.1 km^{2} (0.039 sq mi) or 8.8% is forested. Of the rest of the land, 0.53 km^{2} (0.20 sq mi) or 46.5% is settled (buildings or roads).

Of the built up area, housing and buildings made up 26.3% and transportation infrastructure made up 14.9%. Power and water infrastructure as well as other special developed areas made up 2.6% of the area while parks, green belts and sports fields made up 1.8%. Out of the forested land, 7.0% of the total land area is heavily forested and 1.8% is covered with orchards or small clusters of trees. Of the agricultural land, 34.2% is used for growing crops and 7.9% is pastures, while 1.8% is used for orchards or vine crops.

The municipality is the capital of the Wasseramt district. It is located on the eastern edge of the Gerlafinger plain.

== Coat of arms ==
The blazon of the municipal coat of arms is Or three Linden Leaves slipped Vert.

== Demographics ==
Kriegstetten has a population (as of December 11, 2025) of 3,172. As of 2008, 7.6% of the population are resident foreign nationals. Over the last 10 years (1999–2009 ) the population has changed at a rate of 10.8%. It has changed at a rate of 9% due to migration and at a rate of 1.4% due to births and deaths.

Most of the population (as of 2000) speaks German (1,077 or 95.6%), with Italian being second most common (11 or 1.0%) and French being third (9 or 0.8%).

As of 2008, the gender distribution of the population was 50.2% male and 49.8% female. The population was made up of 553 Swiss men (44.6% of the population) and 69 (5.6%) non-Swiss men. There were 571 Swiss women (46.0%) and 47 (3.8%) non-Swiss women. Of the population in the municipality 223 or about 19.8% were born in Kriegstetten and lived there in 2000. There were 444 or 39.4% who were born in the same canton, while 324 or 28.8% were born somewhere else in Switzerland, and 99 or 8.8% were born outside of Switzerland.

In 2008 there were 8 live births to Swiss citizens and were 7 deaths of Swiss citizens. Ignoring immigration and emigration, the population of Swiss citizens increased by 1 while the foreign population remained the same. There were 5 Swiss men and 1 Swiss woman who immigrated back to Switzerland. At the same time, there was 1 non-Swiss man who emigrated from Switzerland to another country and 4 non-Swiss women who immigrated from another country to Switzerland. The total Swiss population change in 2008 (from all sources, including moves across municipal borders) was an increase of 4 and the non-Swiss population decreased by 4 people. This represents a population growth rate of 0.0%.

The age distribution, as of 2000, in Kriegstetten is; 77 children or 6.8% of the population are between 0 and 6 years old and 226 teenagers or 20.1% are between 7 and 19. Of the adult population, 51 people or 4.5% of the population are between 20 and 24 years old. 370 people or 32.9% are between 25 and 44, and 278 people or 24.7% are between 45 and 64. The senior population distribution is 91 people or 8.1% of the population are between 65 and 79 years old and there are 33 people or 2.9% who are over 80.

As of 2000, there were 487 people who were single and never married in the municipality. There were 515 married individuals, 62 widows or widowers and 62 individuals who are divorced.

As of 2000, there were 454 private households in the municipality, and an average of 2.4 persons per household. There were 134 households that consist of only one person and 25 households with five or more people. Out of a total of 460 households that answered this question, 29.1% were households made up of just one person. Of the rest of the households, there are 141 married couples without children, 154 married couples with children There were 19 single parents with a child or children. There were 6 households that were made up of unrelated people and 6 households that were made up of some sort of institution or another collective housing.

In 2000 there were 250 single family homes (or 75.3% of the total) out of a total of 332 inhabited buildings. There were 40 multi-family buildings (12.0%), along with 22 multi-purpose buildings that were mostly used for housing (6.6%) and 20 other use buildings (commercial or industrial) that also had some housing (6.0%). Of the single family homes 11 were built before 1919, while 45 were built between 1990 and 2000. The greatest number of single family homes (88) were built between 1981 and 1990.

In 2000 there were 485 apartments in the municipality. The most common apartment size was 5 rooms of which there were 150. There were single room apartments and 224 apartments with five or more rooms. Of these apartments, a total of 442 apartments (91.1% of the total) were permanently occupied, while 29 apartments (6.0%) were seasonally occupied and 14 apartments (2.9%) were empty. As of 2009, the construction rate of new housing units was 1.6 new units per 1000 residents. The vacancy rate for the municipality, in 2010, was 1.16%.

The historical population is given in the following chart:

== Politics ==
In the 2007 federal election the most popular party was the SVP which received 35.42% of the vote. The next three most popular parties were the SP (19.32%), the FDP (18.72%) and the CVP (16.93%). In the federal election, a total of 460 votes were cast, and the voter turnout was 52.3%.

== Economy ==
As of 2010, Kriegstetten had an unemployment rate of 3.6%. As of 2008, there were 7 people employed in the primary economic sector and about 3 businesses involved in this sector. 79 people were employed in the secondary sector and there were 15 businesses in this sector. 395 people were employed in the tertiary sector, with 41 businesses in this sector. There were 647 residents of the municipality who were employed in some capacity, of which females made up 43.6% of the workforce.

In 2008 the total number of full-time equivalent jobs was 337. The number of jobs in the primary sector was 4, all of which were in agriculture. The number of jobs in the secondary sector was 68 of which 43 or (63.2%) were in manufacturing and 25 (36.8%) were in construction. The number of jobs in the tertiary sector was 265. In the tertiary sector; 27 or 10.2% were in wholesale or retail sales or the repair of motor vehicles, 14 or 5.3% were in the movement and storage of goods, 48 or 18.1% were in a hotel or restaurant, 41 or 15.5% were in the information industry, 6 or 2.3% were the insurance or financial industry, 18 or 6.8% were technical professionals or scientists, 62 or 23.4% were in education and 30 or 11.3% were in health care.

In 2000, there were 294 workers who commuted into the municipality and 513 workers who commuted away. The municipality is a net exporter of workers, with about 1.7 workers leaving the municipality for every one entering. Of the working population, 14.2% used public transportation to get to work, and 63.2% used a private car.

== Religion ==
From the 2000 census, 364 or 32.3% were Roman Catholic, while 472 or 41.9% belonged to the Swiss Reformed Church. Of the rest of the population, there were 10 members of an Orthodox church (or about 0.89% of the population), there were 2 individuals (or about 0.18% of the population) who belonged to the Christian Catholic Church, and there were 40 individuals (or about 3.55% of the population) who belonged to another Christian church. There were 13 (or about 1.15% of the population) who were Islamic. There were 3 individuals who were Buddhist and 5 individuals who were Hindu. 185 (or about 16.43% of the population) belonged to no church, are agnostic or atheist, and 32 individuals (or about 2.84% of the population) did not answer the question.

== Education ==
In Kriegstetten about 490 or (43.5%) of the population have completed non-mandatory upper secondary education, and 151 or (13.4%) have completed additional higher education (either university or a Fachhochschule). Of the 151 who completed tertiary schooling, 75.5% were Swiss men, 17.9% were Swiss women, 4.6% were non-Swiss men.

As of 2000, there were 82 students in Kriegstetten who came from another municipality, while 59 residents attended schools outside the municipality.
