= Gerlafingen =

- Municipality
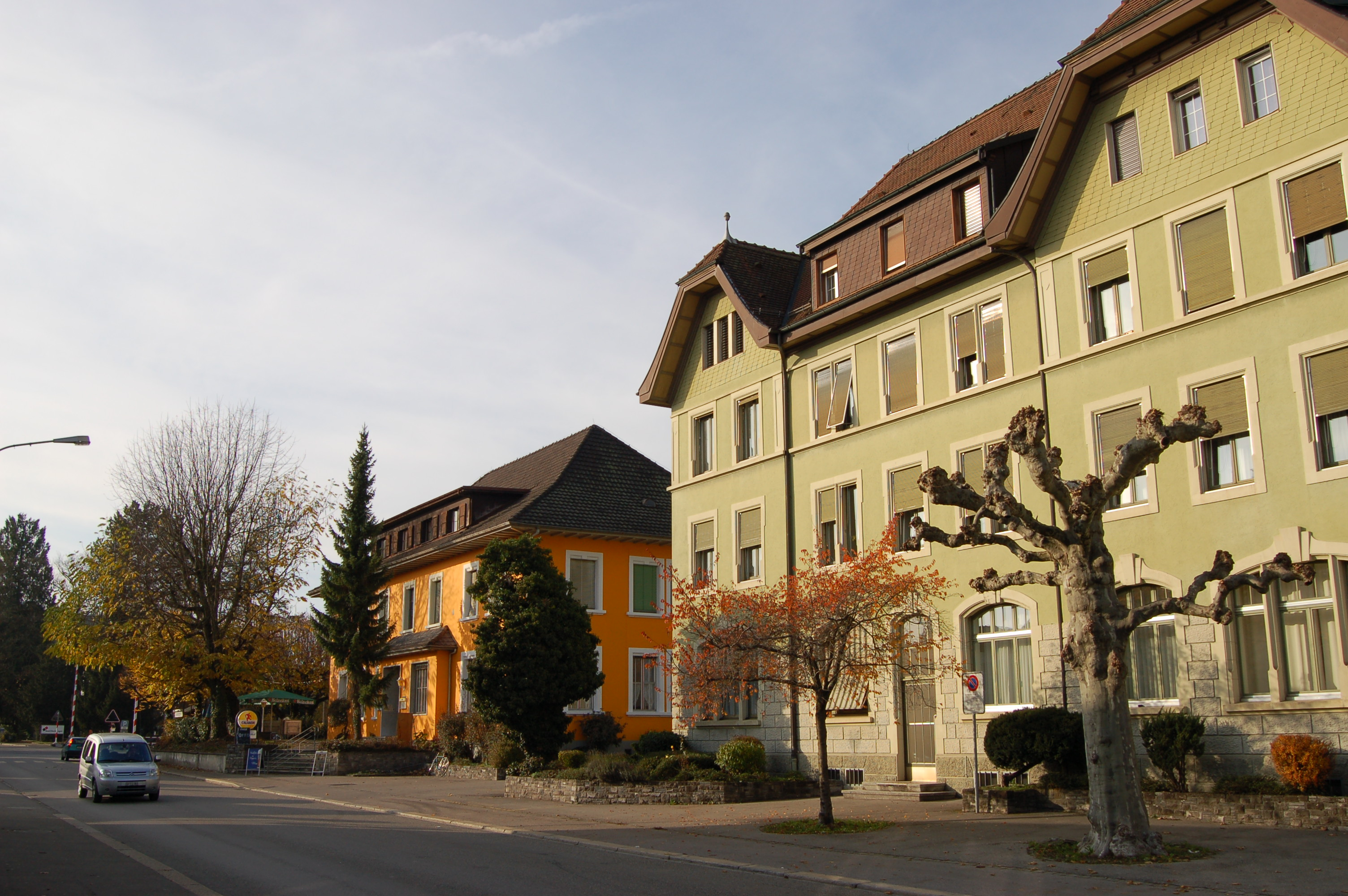
- Gerlafingen village

- Flag Coat of arms
- Location of Gerlafingen
- Location within Switzerland Location within Canton of Solothurn
- Coordinates: 47°10′N 7°34′E
- Country: Switzerland
- Canton: Solothurn
- District: Wasseramt

Area
  - Total: 1.85 km^{2} (0.71 sq mi)
- Elevation: 451 m (1,480 ft)

Population (December 2020)
  - Total: 5,502
  - Density: 2,970/km^{2} (7,700/sq mi)
- Time zone: UTC+01:00 (CET)
  - Summer (DST): UTC+02:00 (CEST)
- Postal code: 4563
- SFOS number: 2519
- ISO 3166 code: CH-SO
- Surrounded by: Bätterkinden (BE), Biberist, Derendingen, Kriegstetten, Obergerlafingen, Zielebach (BE)
- Website: www.gerlafingen.ch

Gerlafingen is a municipality in the district of Wasseramt in the canton of Solothurn in Switzerland.

== History ==
Gerlafingen is first mentioned in 1278 as Nidergerolvingen.

== Geography ==
Aerial view (1953)

Gerlafingen has an area, as of 2009, of 1.85 square kilometers (0.71 sq mi). Of this area, 0.18 km^{2} (0.069 sq mi) or 9.7% is used for agricultural purposes, while 0.19 km^{2} (0.073 sq mi) or 10.3% is forested. Of the rest of the land, 1.52 km^{2} (0.59 sq mi) or 82.2% is settled (buildings or roads), 0.02 km^{2} (4.9 acres) or 1.1% is either rivers or lakes.

Of the built up area, industrial buildings made up 15.7% of the total area while housing and buildings made up 44.3% and transportation infrastructure made up 12.4%. Power and water infrastructure as well as other special developed areas made up 2.7% of the area while parks, green belts and sports fields made up 7.0%. Out of the forested land, 8.6% of the total land area is heavily forested and 1.6% is covered with orchards or small clusters of trees. Of the agricultural land, 4.9% is used for growing crops and 3.2% is pastures, while 1.6% is used for orchards or vine crops. All the water in the municipality is flowing water.

The municipality is located in the Wasseramt district, on the eastern bank of the Emme river, about 5 km (3.1 mi) south of Solothurn.

== Coat of arms ==
The blazon of the municipal coat of arms is Gules a Cramp Azure in bend between two Mullets or one above the other.

== Demographics ==
Gerlafingen has a population (as of December 2020) of 5,502. As of 2008, 39.7% of the population are resident foreign nationals. Over the last 10 years (1999–2009 ) the population has changed at a rate of 2%. It has changed at a rate of 1.8% due to migration and at a rate of 1.4% due to births and deaths.

Most of the population (as of 2000) speaks German (3,619 or 77.1%), with Italian being second most common (328 or 7.0%) and Turkish being third (227 or 4.8%). There are 28 people who speak French and 3 people who speak Romansh.

As of 2008, the gender distribution of the population was 49.7% male and 50.3% female. The population was made up of 1,397 Swiss men (28.7% of the population) and 1,022 (21.0%) non-Swiss men. There were 1,552 Swiss women (31.9%) and 893 (18.4%) non-Swiss women. Of the population in the municipality 1,160 or about 24.7% were born in Gerlafingen and lived there in 2000. There were 971 or 20.7% who were born in the same canton, while 1,063 or 22.6% were born somewhere else in Switzerland, and 1,362 or 29.0% were born outside of Switzerland.

In 2008 there were 29 live births to Swiss citizens and 37 births to non-Swiss citizens, and in same time span there were 40 deaths of Swiss citizens and 7 non-Swiss citizen deaths. Ignoring immigration and emigration, the population of Swiss citizens decreased by 11 while the foreign population increased by 30. There were 7 Swiss men and 3 Swiss women who immigrated back to Switzerland. At the same time, there were 40 non-Swiss men and 17 non-Swiss women who immigrated from another country to Switzerland. The total Swiss population change in 2008 (from all sources, including moves across municipal borders) was a decrease of 21 and the non-Swiss population increased by 74 people. This represents a population growth rate of 1.1%.

The age distribution, as of 2000, in Gerlafingen is; 347 children or 7.4% of the population are between 0 and 6 years old and 748 teenagers or 15.9% are between 7 and 19. Of the adult population, 304 people or 6.5% of the population are between 20 and 24 years old. 1,406 people or 30.0% are between 25 and 44, and 1,028 people or 21.9% are between 45 and 64. The senior population distribution is 593 people or 12.6% of the population are between 65 and 79 years old and there are 268 people or 5.7% who are over 80.

As of 2000, there were 1,830 people who were single and never married in the municipality. There were 2,266 married individuals, 338 widows or widowers and 260 individuals who are divorced.

As of 2000, there were 1,950 private households in the municipality, and an average of 2.3 persons per household. There were 655 households that consist of only one person and 149 households with five or more people. Out of a total of 1,973 households that answered this question, 33.2% were households made up of just one person and there were 17 adults who lived with their parents. Of the rest of the households, there are 550 married couples without children, 598 married couples with children There were 104 single parents with a child or children. There were 26 households that were made up of unrelated people and 23 households that were made up of some sort of institution or another collective housing.

In 2000 there were 510 single family homes (or 56.8% of the total) out of a total of 898 inhabited buildings. There were 279 multi-family buildings (31.1%), along with 62 multi-purpose buildings that were mostly used for housing (6.9%) and 47 other use buildings (commercial or industrial) that also had some housing (5.2%). Of the single family homes 14 were built before 1919, while 31 were built between 1990 and 2000. The greatest number of single family homes (165) were built between 1946 and 1960.

In 2000 there were 2,187 apartments in the municipality. The most common apartment size was 4 rooms of which there were 696. There were 44 single room apartments and 519 apartments with five or more rooms. Of these apartments, a total of 1,898 apartments (86.8% of the total) were permanently occupied, while 153 apartments (7.0%) were seasonally occupied and 136 apartments (6.2%) were empty. As of 2009, the construction rate of new housing units was 1.7 new units per 1000 residents. The vacancy rate for the municipality, in 2010, was 1.98%.

The historical population is given in the following chart:

== Politics ==
In the 2007 federal election the most popular party was the SVP which received 29.41% of the vote. The next three most popular parties were the SP (28.52%), the FDP (20.52%) and the CVP (10.33%). In the federal election, a total of 1,041 votes were cast, and the voter turnout was 41.6%.

== Economy ==
As of 2010, Gerlafingen had an unemployment rate of 6.3%. As of 2008, there were 9 people employed in the primary economic sector and about 3 businesses involved in this sector. 795 people were employed in the secondary sector and there were 36 businesses in this sector. 771 people were employed in the tertiary sector, with 141 businesses in this sector. There were 2,243 residents of the municipality who were employed in some capacity, of which females made up 41.3% of the workforce.

In 2008 the total number of full-time equivalent jobs was 1,356. The number of jobs in the primary sector was 6, all of which were in agriculture. The number of jobs in the secondary sector was 772 of which 643 or (83.3%) were in manufacturing and 129 (16.7%) were in construction. The number of jobs in the tertiary sector was 578. In the tertiary sector; 165 or 28.5% were in wholesale or retail sales or the repair of motor vehicles, 30 or 5.2% were in the movement and storage of goods, 45 or 7.8% were in a hotel or restaurant, 28 or 4.8% were in the information industry, 11 or 1.9% were the insurance or financial industry, 57 or 9.9% were technical professionals or scientists, 53 or 9.2% were in education and 124 or 21.5% were in health care.

In 2000, there were 1,071 workers who commuted into the municipality and 1,613 workers who commuted away. The municipality is a net exporter of workers, with about 1.5 workers leaving the municipality for every one entering. Of the working population, 12.2% used public transportation to get to work, and 59.6% used a private car.

== Religion ==
From the 2000 census, 1,238 or 26.4% were Roman Catholic, while 1,544 or 32.9% belonged to the Swiss Reformed Church. Of the rest of the population, there were 138 members of an Orthodox church (or about 2.94% of the population), there were 11 individuals (or about 0.23% of the population) who belonged to the Christian Catholic Church, and there were 107 individuals (or about 2.28% of the population) who belonged to another Christian church. There were 7 individuals (or about 0.15% of the population) who were Jewish, and 787 (or about 16.77% of the population) who were Islamic. There were 12 individuals who were Buddhist, 31 individuals who were Hindu and 2 individuals who belonged to another church. 692 (or about 14.74% of the population) belonged to no church, are agnostic or atheist, and 125 individuals (or about 2.66% of the population) did not answer the question.

== Education ==
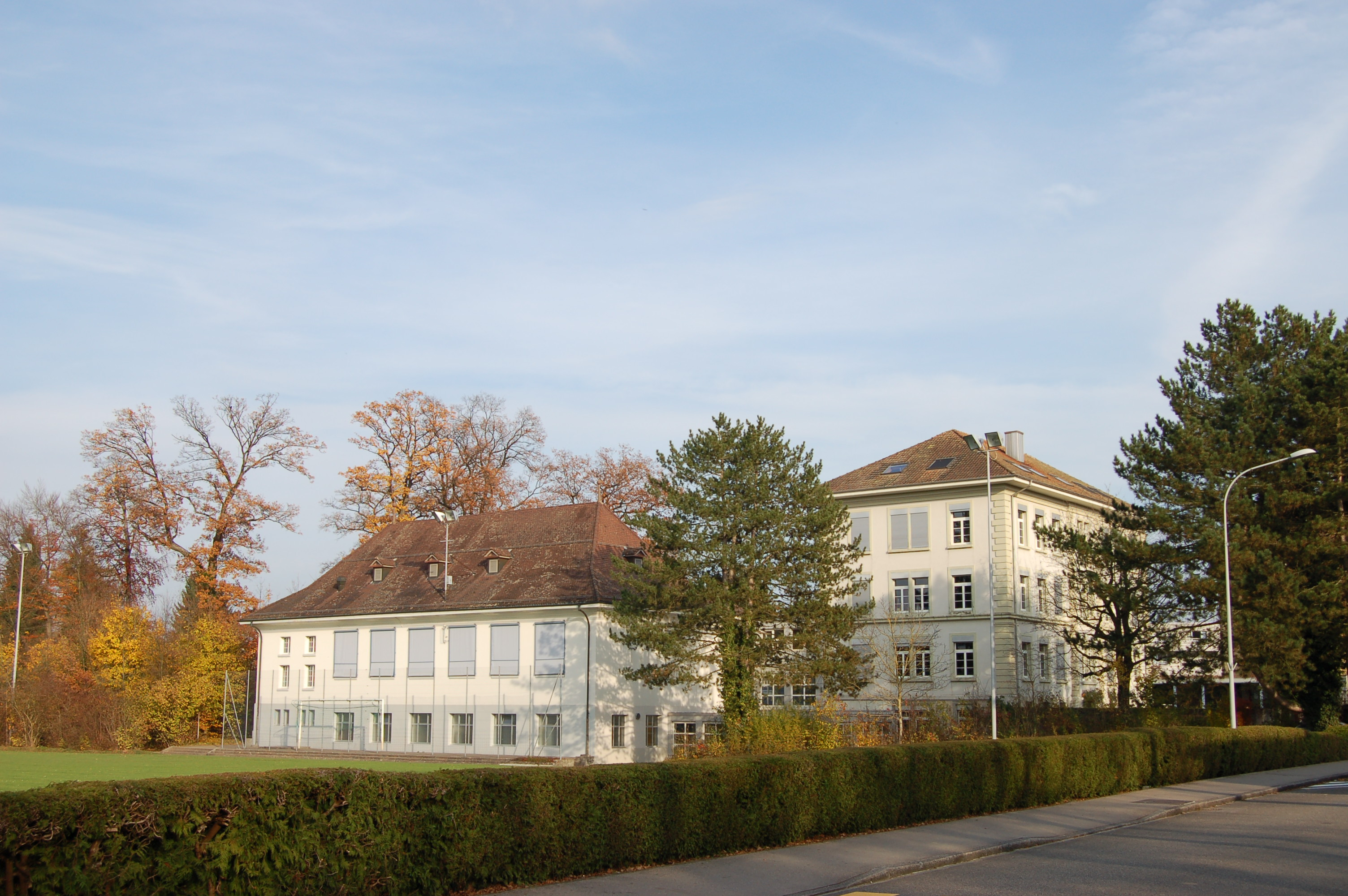
Gerlafingen school house

In Gerlafingen about 1,552 or (33.1%) of the population have completed non-mandatory upper secondary education, and 365 or (7.8%) have completed additional higher education (either university or a Fachhochschule). Of the 365 who completed tertiary schooling, 67.9% were Swiss men, 18.1% were Swiss women, 10.4% were non-Swiss men and 3.6% were non-Swiss women.

During the 2010-2011 school year there were a total of 365 students in the Gerlafingen school system. The education system in the Canton of Solothurn allows young children to attend two years of non-obligatory Kindergarten. During that school year, there were 94 children in kindergarten. The canton's school system requires students to attend six years of primary school, with some of the children attending smaller, specialized classes. In the municipality there were 271 students in primary school. The secondary school program consists of three lower, obligatory years of schooling, followed by three to five years of optional, advanced schools. The lower secondary students from the neighboring municipalities Obergerlafingen and Recherswil attend their school in Gerlafingen.

As of 2000, there were 99 students in Gerlafingen who came from another municipality, while 107 residents attended schools outside the municipality.
