= Recherswil =

- Municipality
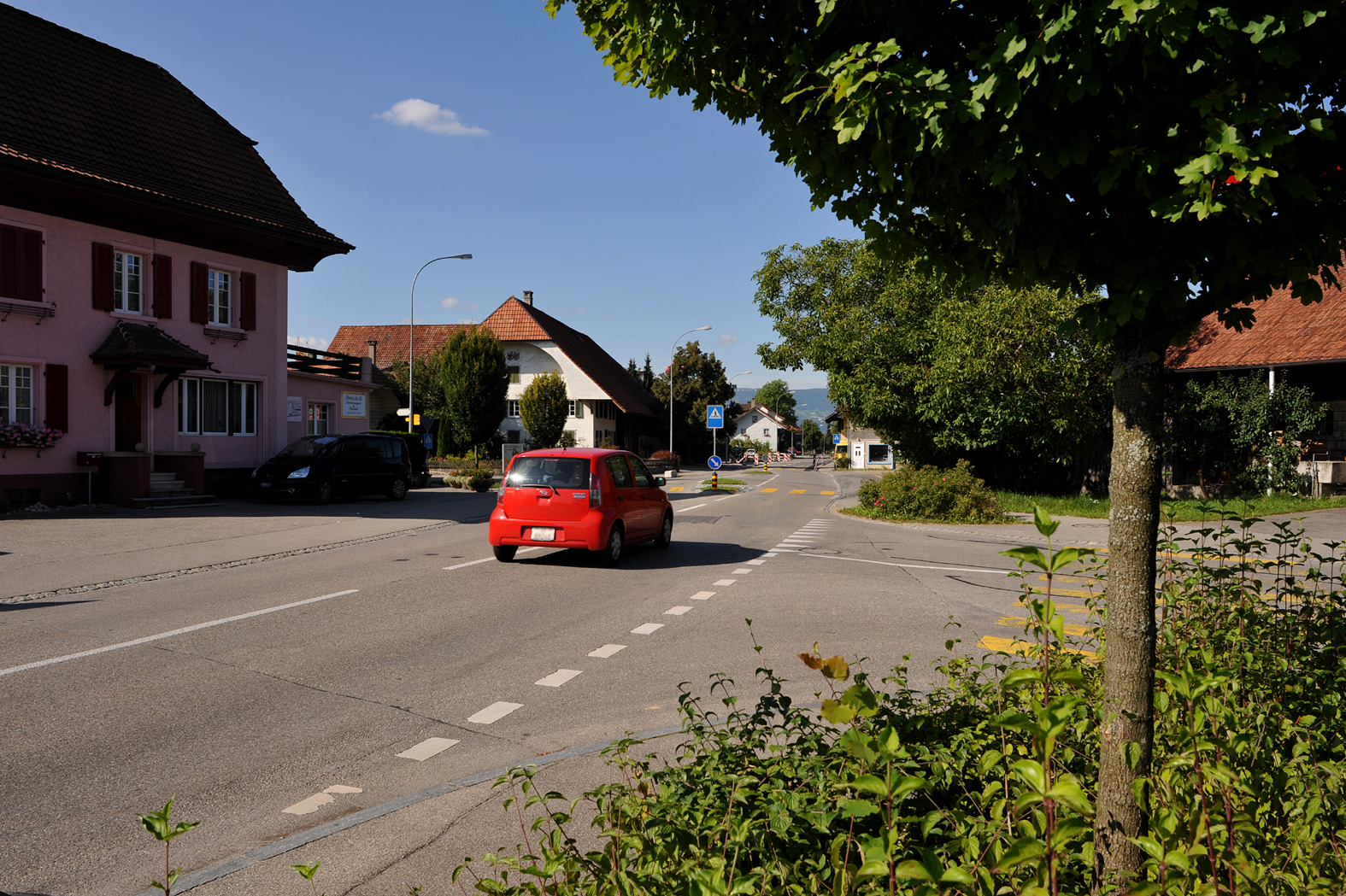
- Recherswil village

- Coat of arms
- Location of Recherswil
- Location within Switzerland Location within Canton of Solothurn
- Coordinates: 47°10′N 7°36′E
- Country: Switzerland
- Canton: Solothurn
- District: Wasseramt

Area
  - Total: 3.37 km^{2} (1.30 sq mi)
- Elevation: 458 m (1,503 ft)

Population (December 2020)
  - Total: 2,028
  - Density: 602/km^{2} (1,560/sq mi)
- Time zone: UTC+01:00 (CET)
  - Summer (DST): UTC+02:00 (CEST)
- Postal code: 4565
- SFOS number: 2530
- ISO 3166 code: CH-SO
- Surrounded by: Halten, Heinrichswil-Winistorf, Koppigen (BE), Kriegstetten, Obergerlafingen, Willadingen (BE)
- Website: www.recherswil.ch

Recherswil is a municipality in the district of Wasseramt, in the canton of Solothurn in Switzerland.

== History ==
Recherswil is first mentioned in 1278 as Richirswile.

== Geography ==
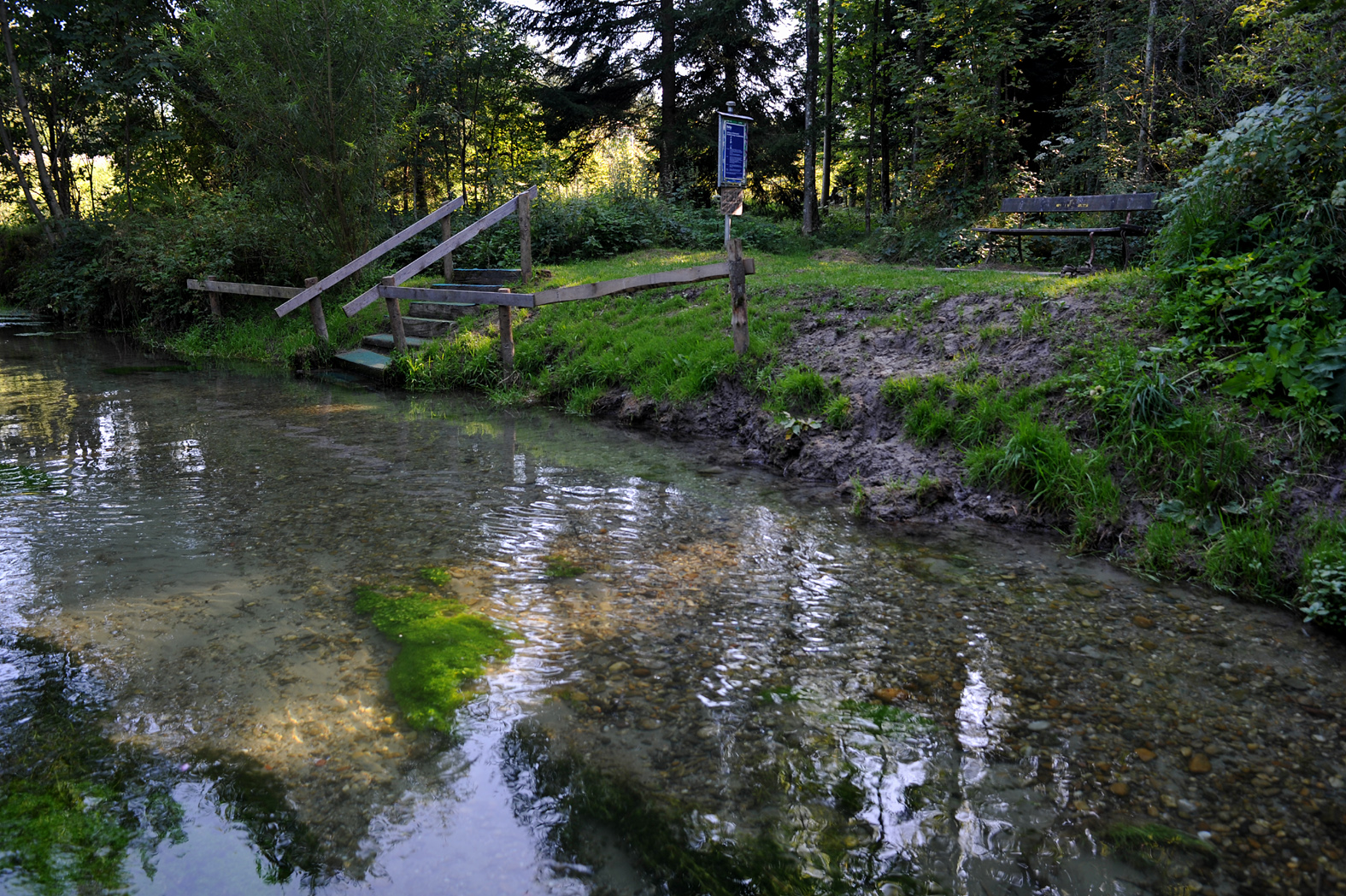
Kneippism site in Recherswil

Aerial view (1970)

Recherswil has an area, as of 2009, of 3.37 square kilometers (1.30 sq mi). Of this area, 1.86 km^{2} (0.72 sq mi) or 55.2% is used for agricultural purposes, while 0.74 km^{2} (0.29 sq mi) or 22.0% is forested. Of the rest of the land, 0.7 km^{2} (0.27 sq mi) or 20.8% is settled (buildings or roads), 0.01 km^{2} (2.5 acres) or 0.3% is either rivers or lakes and 0.02 km^{2} (4.9 acres) or 0.6% is unproductive land.

Of the built up area, industrial buildings made up 1.2% of the total area while housing and buildings made up 12.2% and transportation infrastructure made up 7.1%. Out of the forested land, 20.2% of the total land area is heavily forested and 1.8% is covered with orchards or small clusters of trees. Of the agricultural land, 43.6% is used for growing crops and 9.2% is pastures, while 2.4% is used for orchards or vine crops. All the water in the municipality is flowing water.

The municipality is located in the Wasseramt district, between the Emme and Oesch rivers.

== Coat of arms ==
The blazon of the municipal coat of arms is Gules a Ploughshare Sable between two Mullets Or in chief.

== Demographics ==
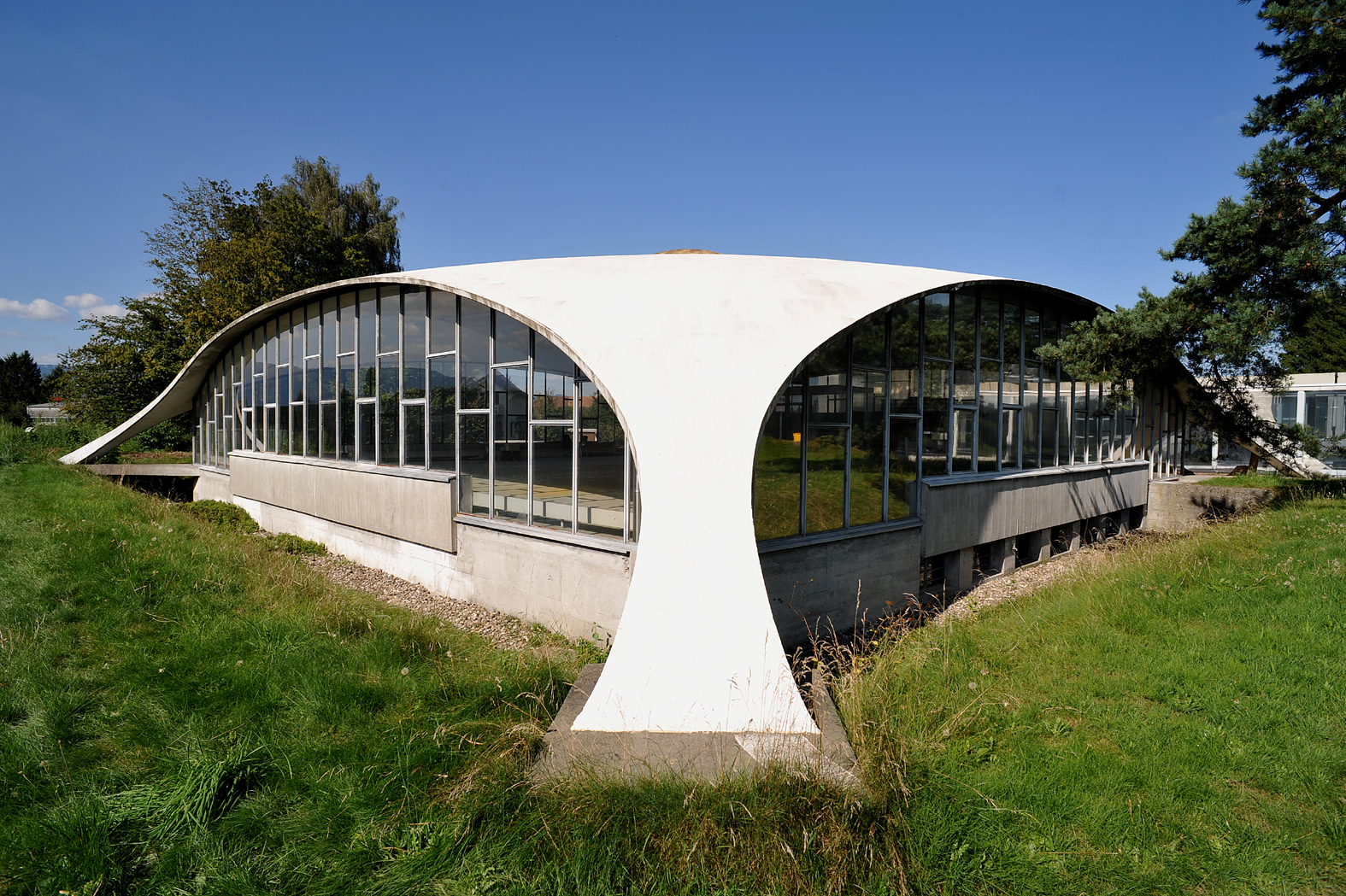
Isler shell, a concrete dome roof of a building of the former Kilcher company in Recherswil

Recherswil has a population (as of December 2020) of 2,028. As of 2008, 8.1% of the population are resident foreign nationals. Over the last 10 years (1999–2009 ) the population has changed at a rate of 1.4%. It has changed at a rate of 0.5% due to migration and at a rate of -0.2% due to births and deaths.

Most of the population (as of 2000) speaks German (1,518 or 95.7%), with Italian being second most common (34 or 2.1%) and Serbo-Croatian being third (9 or 0.6%). There are 3 people who speak French and 1 person who speaks Romansh.

As of 2008, the gender distribution of the population was 49.0% male and 51.0% female. The population was made up of 749 Swiss men (44.6% of the population) and 73 (4.4%) non-Swiss men. There were 791 Swiss women (47.1%) and 65 (3.9%) non-Swiss women. Of the population in the municipality 452 or about 28.5% were born in Recherswil and lived there in 2000. There were 468 or 29.5% who were born in the same canton, while 480 or 30.3% were born somewhere else in Switzerland, and 141 or 8.9% were born outside of Switzerland.

In 2008 there were 13 live births to Swiss citizens and 1 birth to non-Swiss citizens, and in same time span there were 14 deaths of Swiss citizens. Ignoring immigration and emigration, the population of Swiss citizens decreased by 1 while the foreign population increased by 1. There were 2 Swiss men and 1 Swiss woman who emigrated from Switzerland. At the same time, there were 3 non-Swiss women who emigrated from Switzerland to another country. The total Swiss population change in 2008 (from all sources, including moves across municipal borders) was a decrease of 19 and the non-Swiss population decreased by 11 people. This represents a population growth rate of -1.8%.

The age distribution, as of 2000, in Recherswil is; 100 children or 6.3% of the population are between 0 and 6 years old and 290 teenagers or 18.3% are between 7 and 19. Of the adult population, 71 people or 4.5% of the population are between 20 and 24 years old. 460 people or 29.0% are between 25 and 44, and 452 people or 28.5% are between 45 and 64. The senior population distribution is 173 people or 10.9% of the population are between 65 and 79 years old and there are 40 people or 2.5% who are over 80.

As of 2000, there were 592 people who were single and never married in the municipality. There were 816 married individuals, 90 widows or widowers and 88 individuals who are divorced.

As of 2000, there were 641 private households in the municipality, and an average of 2.5 persons per household. There were 156 households that consist of only one person and 45 households with five or more people. Out of a total of 649 households that answered this question, 24.0% were households made up of just one person and there were 9 adults who lived with their parents. Of the rest of the households, there are 214 married couples without children, 225 married couples with children There were 30 single parents with a child or children. There were 7 households that were made up of unrelated people and 8 households that were made up of some sort of institution or another collective housing.

In 2000 there were 415 single family homes (or 81.2% of the total) out of a total of 511 inhabited buildings. There were 57 multi-family buildings (11.2%), along with 29 multi-purpose buildings that were mostly used for housing (5.7%) and 10 other use buildings (commercial or industrial) that also had some housing (2.0%). Of the single family homes 31 were built before 1919, while 47 were built between 1990 and 2000. The greatest number of single family homes (96) were built between 1971 and 1980.

In 2000 there were 658 apartments in the municipality. The most common apartment size was 4 rooms of which there were 199. There were 8 single room apartments and 310 apartments with five or more rooms. Of these apartments, a total of 627 apartments (95.3% of the total) were permanently occupied, while 11 apartments (1.7%) were seasonally occupied and 20 apartments (3.0%) were empty. As of 2009, the construction rate of new housing units was 0 new units per 1000 residents. The vacancy rate for the municipality, in 2010, was 0.71%.

The historical population is given in the following chart:

== Politics ==
In the 2007 federal election the most popular party was the SVP which received 27.33% of the vote. The next three most popular parties were the SP (27.09%), the CVP (18.58%) and the FDP (15.95%). In the federal election, a total of 643 votes were cast, and the voter turnout was 50.5%.

== Economy ==
As of 2010, Recherswil had an unemployment rate of 2.6%. As of 2008, there were 40 people employed in the primary economic sector and about 10 businesses involved in this sector. 101 people were employed in the secondary sector and there were 26 businesses in this sector. 134 people were employed in the tertiary sector, with 38 businesses in this sector. There were 871 residents of the municipality who were employed in some capacity, of which females made up 42.3% of the workforce.

In 2008 the total number of full-time equivalent jobs was 208. The number of jobs in the primary sector was 23, all of which were in agriculture. The number of jobs in the secondary sector was 91 of which 53 or (58.2%) were in manufacturing and 38 (41.8%) were in construction. The number of jobs in the tertiary sector was 94. In the tertiary sector; 22 or 23.4% were in wholesale or retail sales or the repair of motor vehicles, 8 or 8.5% were in the movement and storage of goods, 6 or 6.4% were in a hotel or restaurant, 5 or 5.3% were in the information industry, 13 or 13.8% were the insurance or financial industry, 10 or 10.6% were technical professionals or scientists, 13 or 13.8% were in education and 3 or 3.2% were in health care.

In 2000, there were 151 workers who commuted into the municipality and 702 workers who commuted away. The municipality is a net exporter of workers, with about 4.6 workers leaving the municipality for every one entering. Of the working population, 13.9% used public transportation to get to work, and 63.5% used a private car.

== Religion ==
From the 2000 census, 522 or 32.9% were Roman Catholic, while 690 or 43.5% belonged to the Swiss Reformed Church. Of the rest of the population, there were 8 members of an Orthodox church (or about 0.50% of the population), there was 1 individual who belongs to the Christian Catholic Church, and there were 37 individuals (or about 2.33% of the population) who belonged to another Christian church. There were 31 (or about 1.95% of the population) who were Islamic. There was 1 person who was Buddhist and 2 individuals who belonged to another church. 255 (or about 16.08% of the population) belonged to no church, are agnostic or atheist, and 39 individuals (or about 2.46% of the population) did not answer the question.

== Education ==
In Recherswil about 664 or (41.9%) of the population have completed non-mandatory upper secondary education, and 155 or (9.8%) have completed additional higher education (either university or a Fachhochschule). Of the 155 who completed tertiary schooling, 79.4% were Swiss men, 15.5% were Swiss women, 4.5% were non-Swiss men.

As of 2000, there were 21 students in Recherswil who came from another municipality, while 111 residents attended schools outside the municipality.
