= Solothurn–Langnau railway =

Railway line

Solothurn–Burgdorf–Langnau railway

Overview
- Native name: Emmentalbahn
- Line number: 304.1, 304.2, 340
- Termini: Solothurn; Langnau

Service
- Operator: BLS

Technical
- Line length: 38.22 km (23.75 mi)
- Number of tracks: 1
- Track gauge: 1,435 mm (4 ft 8 1/2 in)
- Minimum radius: 350 metres (1,150 ft)
- Electrification: 15 kV 16.7 Hz AC overhead catenary; 750 V 40 Hz 3 phase overhead catenary (Burgdorf–Hasle-Rüegsau, 1899–1933, and Hasle-Rüegsau–Langnau, 1919–1933)
- Maximum incline: 1.2%

The Solothurn–Langnau railway is a railway line in the Emmental in Switzerland. It was built by the Emmentalbahn (Emmental Railway, EB), which was based in Burgdorf. The line runs from Solothurn via Burgdorf to Langnau im Emmental. It is now part of BLS AG.

== History ==
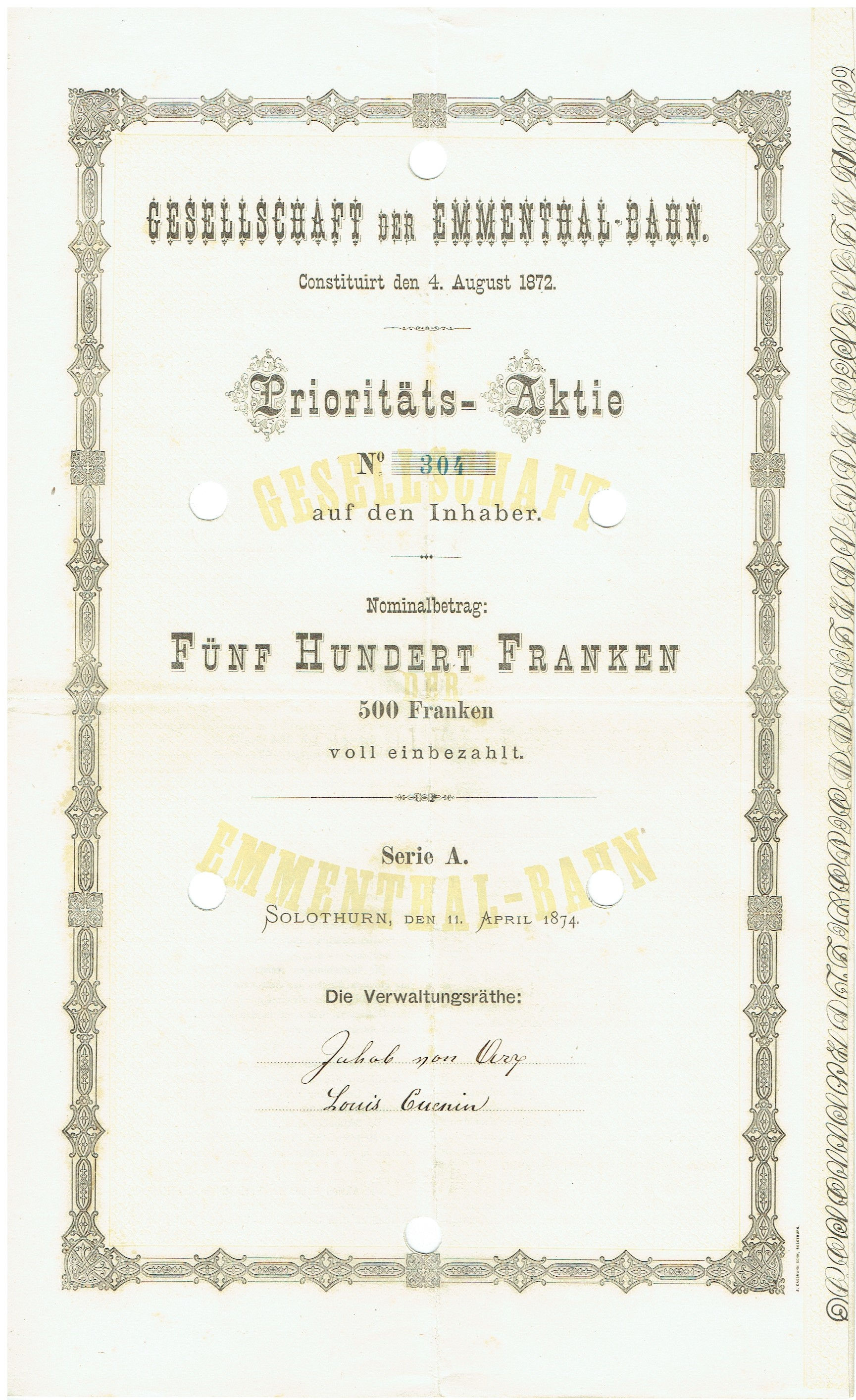
Founder's share of the Gesellschaft der Emmenthal-Bahn, issued 11 April 1874

The company (Emmenthalbahn-Gesellschaft, spelt according to then current orthography) was established on 4 August 1872 and is based in Burgdorf. The license was granted on 1 May 1872 for 99 years.

The company's general meeting approved an agreement to merge with the Burgdorf-Thun-Bahn (Burgdorf-Thun Railway) in Langnau on 20 June 1942. This merger led to the founding of the Emmental-Burgdorf-Thun-Bahn (Emmental-Burgdorf-Thun Railway).

=== Plant opening with steam traction ===
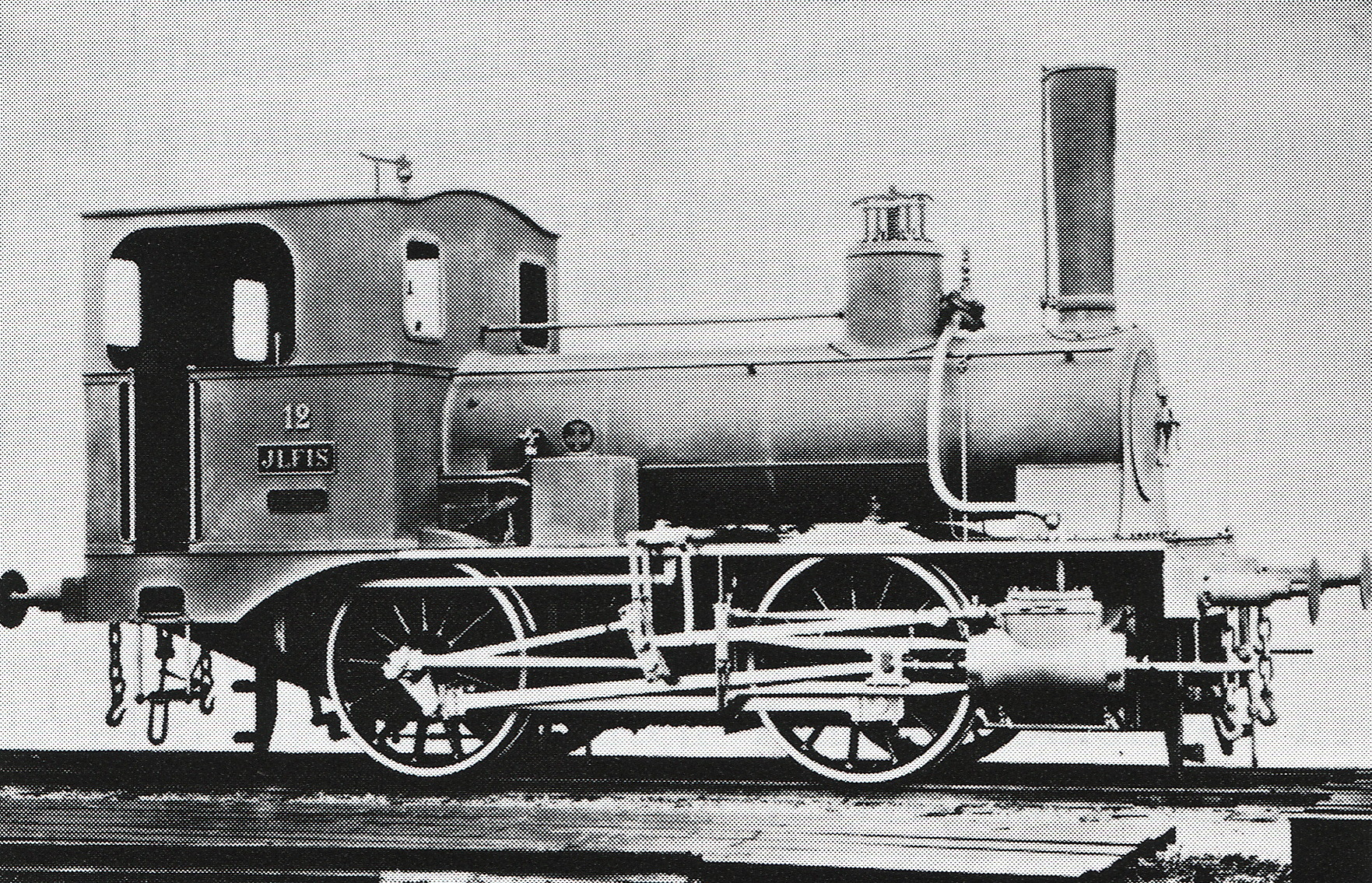
Locomotive no. 12 Jlfis of the Emmentalbahn

The Emmental Railway developed out of the Derendingen–Biberist–Gerlafingen Industrial Horse Railway (Industriepferdebahn), which was opened on 1 April 1864. This connected with the Solothurn–Herzogenbuchsee railway (most of which is now incorporated in the Solothurn–Wanzwil railway) in Derendingen.

The first section of the standard gauge railway was opened on 26 May 1875 between Burgdorf and Derendingen. The 15.62 kilometre-long line from Burgdorf to Biberist was built by the Emmental Railway and connected to the industrial railway from Biberist to Derendingen. On 4 December 1876, the Swiss Central Railway (Schweizerische Centralbahn, SCB) opened the so-called Gäubahn (Gäu Railway), including a section between Olten–Solothurn that is now considered part of the Jura Foot Railway and a 4.33 kilometre-long branch to Biberist, which ran into the station of the Emmental Railway in Solothurn. The branch line was transferred to the Emmental Railway on 21 November 1883. Operations were discontinued on the Biberist–Derendingen section on 30 June 1884.

The EB opened the 18.23 kilometre-long section between Burgdorf and Obermatt junction on the Gümligen–Langnau line on the Bern–Lucerne railway on 12 May 1881. The last, almost three kilometre-long section between Obermatt and Langnau has been operated since its opening over non-EB tracks.

=== New powerful class Ed 4/5 steam locomotives ===
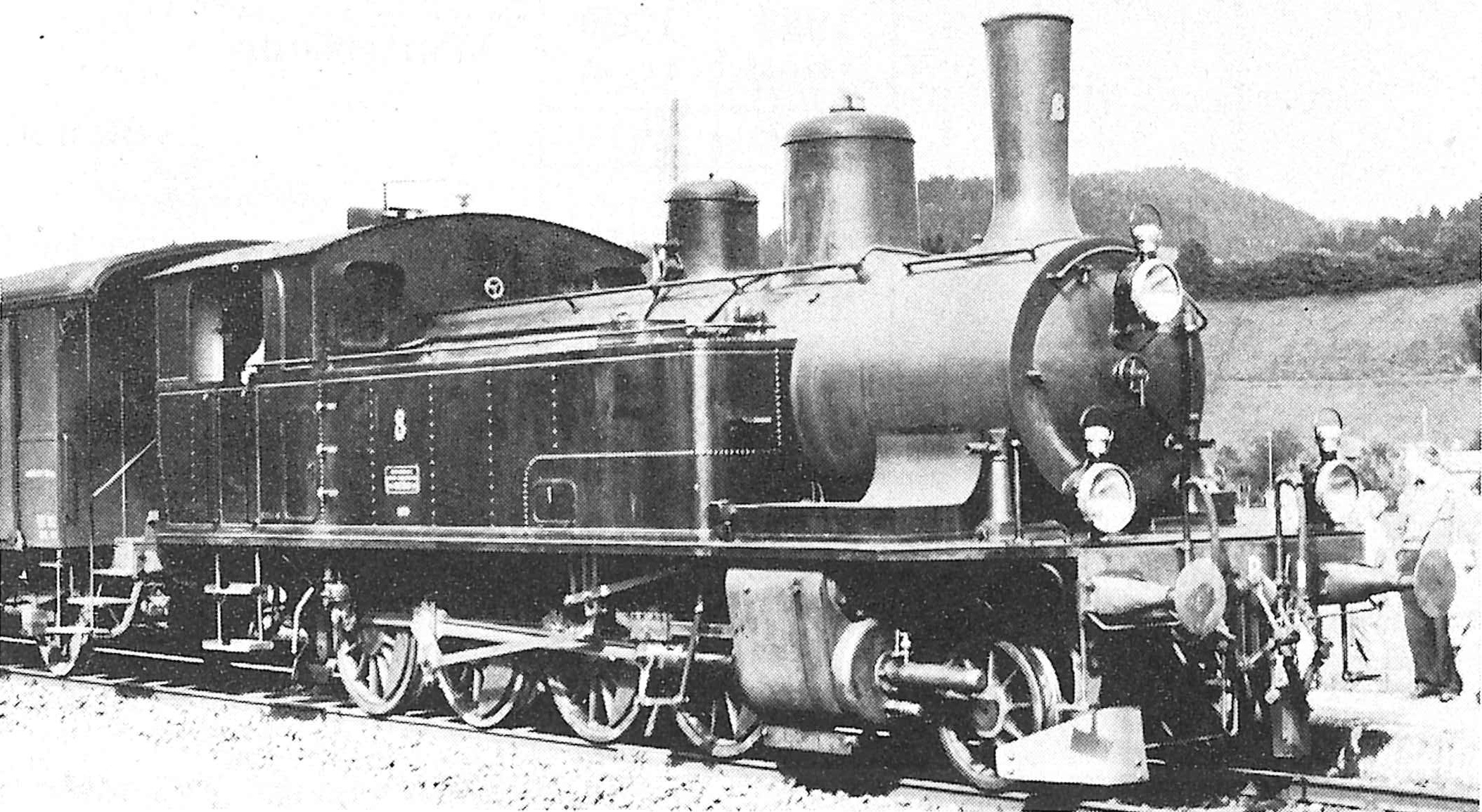
Class Ed 4/5 no. 8 steam locomotive of the Emmentalbahn

In 1899 and 1914, the EB procured three class Ed 4/5 steam locomotives with the operating numbers of 6 to ;8, which were built to a similar design for other Swiss private railways, including as class Ec 4/5 for the Thunerseebahn. Locomotives 6 and 7 were steam locomotives and worked to a two-cylinder compound locomotive system.

No. 8 was built in 1914 as a super-heated locomotive, but otherwise largely corresponded to its predecessors. The hot steam engine achieved 700 horsepower and thus was more powerful than the other locomotives. After the electrification of the line, locomotive no. 8 served until 1965 as a replacement locomotive that could operate independently of the overhead wire. The EBT gave it to the Verein Dampfbahn Bern (VDBB, a steam-railway society) in 1972 and thoroughly refurbished it until 1978. Unfortunately, the locomotive had to be retired after 81 years of loyal service in 1995. In 1999, the locomotive resumed service with a new boiler, but it had to be taken out of service again at the end of 2008, as its mechanical components needed a major overhaul.

=== Electrification ===
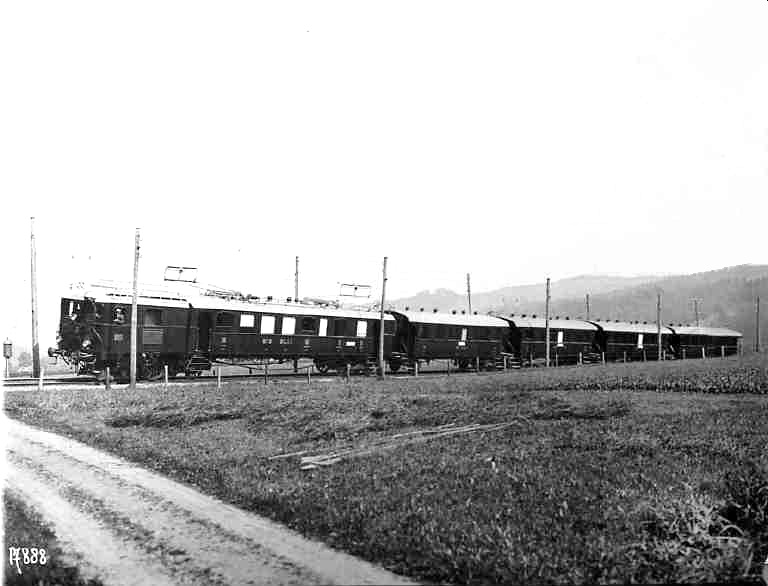
In order to have enough railcars for the three-phase operation to Langnau, the BTB supplemented its inventory in 1921 with two BCe 2/5 sets of the BTB.

Since the opening of the Burgdorf–Thun railway for operations on 21 July 1899, the Emmental Railway operated this railway on the basis of an operating contract and granted it the right to run on its line from Burgdorf to Hasle-Rüegsau. The director of the EB was at the same time also the director of the Burgdorf–Thun-Bahn. The BTB had been electrified since its opening with 700 Volt 40 Hertz three-phase current. So that its trains could run continuously from Burgdorf to Thun, the section of the EB from Burgdorf to Hasle-Rüegsau was also wired with two-wire three-phase overhead line.

During the First World War, shortages of coal forced heavy traffic restrictions to be imposed on steam-powered railway lines. The EB then carried out a so-called emergency electrification on the section from Hasle-Rüegsau to Langnau. It was carried with the same electrical system as that on the neighbouring BTB. Five used BTB distribution substations were installed along the line. A high-voltage line from Schafhausen to Lützelflüh supplied the EB with power. Electrical operations started on 17 December 1919 and BTB rolling stock was used for traction.

In 1932, the lines of the EB and the BTB were converted in several stages to 15 kV 16.7 Hz AC overhead catenary:

- 1 September 1932: Solothurn–Burgdorf
- 8 December 1932: Burgdorf–Langnau

=== Merger with EBT ===
The Emmental Railway merged with the Burgdorf–Thun Railway to form the Emmental-Burgdorf-Thun-Bahn (EBT) in 1942. During the Second World War, the Bernese cantonal government planned the construction of the Swiss Central Airport Utzenstorf. The airport, which was never built, would have included a branch line which would have branched off from the Solothurn–Langnau railway at Aefligen.

On 21 April 1952, there was a head-on collision at Obermatt junction between Emmenmatt and Langnau im Emmental between a freight train of the EBT hauled by locomotive Be 4/4 105 and locomotive Ae 3/6 II 10424 of the Swiss Federal Railways. Due to poor visibility, the vehicles collided with full force. The driver of the freight train was killed, but his colleague of the SBB was able to escape by jumping from the engine. Four train guards were injured.

In 1997, the EBT merged with the Vereinigte Huttwil-Bahnen (United Huttwil Railways, VHB) and the Solothurn-Münster-Bahn (Solothurn-Moutier Railway, SMB) to form the Regionalverkehr Mittelland (RM). The RM and the BLS Lötschbergbahn were merged to form BLS AG in 2006.
